= List of Property Brothers episodes =

Listing of episodes for American television series Property Brothers

Property Brothers is a North American reality television series that features identical twin brothers Jonathan Scott and Drew Scott (born April 28, 1978) who help home buyers to purchase and renovate "fixer-uppers." It was produced by Cineflix, until it was acquired by Scott Brothers Entertainment in 2019.

Property Brothers debuted on the W Network on January 4, 2011, and aired on the channel until the networks's owner, Corus Entertainment, decided to shift the channel's focus to more dramatic content. Starting with 2017/2018 broadcast season, the show began to be broadcast on HGTV Canada in its country of origin. It airs on HGTV (a property of Discovery Inc.) in the United States on a separate schedule, as well as with other affiliates in over 150 other countries. The show is also carried on streaming services such as Netflix and Amazon Prime Video.

== Seasons ==
The dates in this section correspond to the episodes' earliest broadcast date.

| Season | HGTV Season | Episodes | Filming location | Season premiere | Season finale |
|---|---|---|---|---|---|
| 1 | 1 | 13 | Toronto | January 4, 2011 | March 29, 2011 |
| 2 | 2 | 13 | Toronto | October 20, 2011 | January 31, 2012 |
| 2 | 3 | 13 | Austin | February 7, 2012 | May 1, 2012 |
| 3 | 4 | 13 | Austin/Toronto | September 4, 2012 | February 4, 2013 |
| 3 | 5 | 13 | Vancouver | February 17, 2013 | August 22, 2013 |
| 4 | 6 | 13 | Atlanta | January 12, 2014 | Unknown |
| 4 | 7 | 13 | Toronto | October 27, 2014 | Unknown |
| 5 | 8 | 13 | Westchester County | September 14, 2015 | October 28, 2015 |
| 5 | 9 | 13 | Westchester County | Unknown | August 22, 2016 |
| 6 | 10 | 12 | Westchester County | October 24, 2016 | April 17, 2017 |
| 6 | 11 | 13 | Nashville | April 17, 2017 | February 26, 2018 |
| 6 | 12 | 13 | Nashville/Toronto | February 14, 2018 | August 29, 2018 |
| 7 | 12 | 13 | Nashville/Toronto | February 14, 2018 | August 29, 2018 |
| 7 | 13 | 13 | | September 5, 2018 | January 30, 2019 |

== Episodes ==
The episode order in this section corresponds to the episodes' earliest broadcast date.

=== Season 1 ===
| Episode no. (W Network) | Episode no. (HGTV) | Title | Title | Original release date | Original air date (HGTV) |
|---|---|---|---|---|---|
HGTV Season 1
| 1 | 5 | "Leaving the Suburbs" | Christine & John | January 4, 2011 | May 18, 2011 |
John and Christine want to move closer to the high school where he teaches in the city.
| 2 | 2 | "Vintage Clothes, Vintage Homes" | Emma & Kieron | January 11, 2011 | April 27, 2011 |
Fashion designers Emma and Kieron search for a home that has more living and work space downtown property. They also want modern interiors and with vintage character.
| 3 | 3 | "Victorian Dream House" | Stefan & Owen | January 18, 2011 | May 4, 2011 |
Stefan and Owen are living with a friend as they search of a Victorian home with high ceilings, hardwood floors, and a spacious backyard. However, their limited budget is putting their dream home outside of reach.
| 4 | 4 | "Honeymoon Retreat" | Matt & Aleya | January 25, 2011 | May 11, 2011 |
Matt and Aleya search for their dream home before they get married in a few months.
| 5 | 1 | "Family Fixer-Upper" | Stephen & Julie | February 1, 2011 | April 20, 2011 |
Stephan and Julie are searching for a stylish and unique home that accommodates their two dogs, toddler and a newborn, as well as invited guests.
| 6 | 6 | "Run-down Renovation" | Julie & Peter | February 8, 2011 | May 25, 2011 |
| 7 | 7 | "Downtown Dump to Dream Home" | Lise & Andrew | February 15, 2011 | June 1, 2011 |
| 8 | 8 | "Contemporary Fixer-Upper" | Monica & Sam | February 22, 2011 | June 8, 2011 |
| 9 | 9 | "Moving Out of Mom's" | Jessica & Jason | March 1, 2011 | July 27, 2011 |
| 10 | 10 | "Townhouse to Dream House" | Janice & Rob | March 8, 2011 | July 13, 2011 |
| 11 | 11 | "Another Renovation Plan" | Monica & Kevin | March 15, 2011 | July 20, 2011 |
| 12 | 12 | "Out on Their Own" | Andrea & Dave | March 22, 2011 | July 6, 2011 |
| 13 | 13 | "Bachelor Pad to Family Home" | Raun & Jasprit | March 29, 2011 | June 22, 2011 |

=== Season 2 ===
| Episode no. (W Network) | Episode no. (HGTV) | Title | Title | Original release date | Original air date (HGTV) |
|---|---|---|---|---|---|
HGTV Season 2
| 16 | 14 | "Space-less to Spacious" | Sarah & Scott | October 6, 2011 | October 19, 2011 |
| 15 | 15 | "Not Suburban or Subdivision" | Nancy & Dan | October 13, 2011 | October 26, 2011 |
| 14 | 16 | "Empty Nesters Explore the City" | Tina & James | October 20, 2011 | November 2, 2011 |
| 17 | 17 | "Suburbs to City Life" | Tim & Michelle | October 27, 2011 | November 9, 2011 |
| 18 | 18 | "Condo to Reno" | Katherine & Jordan | November 3, 2011 | November 16, 2011 |
| 19 | 19 | "Commute to Compromise" | Lica & Nicolas | November 10, 2011 | November 23, 2011 |
| 20 | 20 | "Expanding the Family Fun" | Jose & Connie | November 17, 2011 | November 30, 2011 |
| 21 | 21 | "Renting to Renovating" | Marianne & Steve | November 24, 2011 | December 7, 2011 |
| 22 | 22 | "Kosher Kitchen" | Liat & Zack | January 3, 2012 | December 14, 2011 |
| 23 | 23 | "First Home Jitters" | Vincent & Helena | January 10, 2012 | December 21, 2011 |
| 24 | 24 | "Construction to Quiet" | Mike & Avi | January 17, 2012 | January 11, 2012 |
| 25 | 25 | "Almost Newlyweds, Almost Home" | Jay & Cara | January 24, 2012 | February 29, 2012 |
| 26 | 26 | "Out of the In-Laws' House" | Delecia & Dwayne | January 31, 2012 | March 14, 2012 |
HGTV Season 3
| 27 | 27 | "Under Their Own Roof" | Wyatt & Whitney | February 7, 2012 | June 13, 2012 |
| 28 | 28 | "Dumping the Duplex" | Morgan & Kristen | February 14, 2012 | June 20, 2012 |
| 29 | 29 | "Abundance of Appliances" | Dan & Brittany | February 21, 2012 | June 20, 2012 |
| 30 | 30 | "Looking for Wow" | Stan & Leslie | February 28, 2012 | June 20, 2012 |
| 31 | 31 | "Space for a Crowd" | Kate & Cole | March 6, 2012 | June 27, 2012 |
| 32 | 32 | "Downtown Dream Home" | Steph & Micah | March 13, 2012 | July 4, 2012 |
| 33 | 33 | "Picturing the Possibilites" | Lana & Jacob | March 20, 2012 | July 11, 2012 |
| 34 | 34 | "Bachelorette Pad" | Amber | March 27, 2012 | July 18, 2012 |
| 35 | 35 | "High-End Home" | Rob & Jessica | April 3, 2012 | July 25, 2012 |
| 36 | 36 | "An Eclectic Vision" | Olivia | April 10, 2012 | August 1, 2012 |
| 37 | 37 | "Fit for a Family" | Sophie & Preston | April 17, 2012 | August 8, 2012 |
| 38 | 38 | "Extended Family Fun" | Cori & Suroosh | April 24, 2012 | August 15, 2012 |
| 39 | 39 | "Active in the City" | Jeanette & Tony | May 1, 2012 | August 22, 2012 |

=== Season 3 ===
| Episode no. (W Network) | Episode no. (HGTV) | Title | Title | Original release date | Original air date (HGTV) |
|---|---|---|---|---|---|
HGTV Season 4
| 41 | 41 | "Kristi & Jay" | Kristi and Jay | September 4, 2012 | January 9, 2013 |
| 42 | 42 | "Courtney & Luke" | Courtney and Luke | September 11, 2012 | January 16, 2013 |
| 43 | 43 | "April" | April | September 18, 2012 | January 23, 2013 |
| 44 | 44 | "Kristine & Paul" | Kristine and Paul | September 25, 2012 | January 30, 2013 |
| 45 | 45 | "Sarah & Mari" | Sarah and Mari | October 2, 2012 | February 6, 2013 |
| 46 | 46 | "Samira & Shawn" | Samira and Shawn | October 9, 2012 | February 13, 2013 |
| 47 | 47 | "Angie & Tito" | Angie and Tito | October 16, 2012 | February 20, 2013 |
| 48 | 48 | "Matt & Krysten" | Matt and Krysten | November 13, 2012 | February 27, 2013 |
| 49 | 49 | "James & David" | James and David | December 3, 2012 | March 6, 2013 |
| 50 | 50 | "Parker & Francesca" | Parker and Francesca | December 17, 2012 | March 13, 2013 |
| 51 | 51 | "Caitlin & Steve" | Caitlin and Steve | December 18, 2012 | March 20, 2013 |
| 52 | 53 | "Rose & Giancarlo" | Rose and Giancarlo | January 28, 2013 | April 3, 2013 |
| 53 | 52 | "Kate & Dave" | Kate and Dave | February 4, 2013 | March 27, 2013 |
HGTV Season 5
| 54 | 1 | "Megan & Greg" | Megan and Greg | February 11, 2013 | August 28, 2013 |
| 55 | 3 | "Marla & Adam" | Marla and Adam | February 21, 2013 | September 11, 2013 |
| 56 | 2 | "Sandra & Kyle" | Sandra and Kyle | March 1, 2013 | September 4, 2013 |
| 57 | 4 | "Mark & Priscilla" | Mark and Priscilla | March 12, 2013 | September 18, 2013 |
| 58 | 5 | "Christine & Mathieu" | Christine and Mathieu | May 24, 2013 | September 25, 2013 |
| 59 | 6 | "Kathryn & Eric" | Kathryn and Eric | May 31, 2013 | October 2, 2013 |
| 60 | 7 | "Danielle & Chad" | Danielle and Chad | June 11, 2013 | October 9, 2013 |
| 61 | 8 | "Mark & Joey" | Mark and Joey | July 2, 2013 | October 16, 2013 |
| 62 | 9 | "Kari & Boris" | Kari and Boris | July 15, 2013 | October 23, 2013 |
| 63 | 10 | "Karina & Stephan" | Karina and Stephan | August 7, 2013 | October 30, 2013 |
| 64 | 12 | "Crista & Sumit" | Crista and Sumit | August 7, 2013 | November 13, 2013 |
| 65 | 11 | "Nancy & Rhonda" | Nancy and Rhonda | August 7, 2013 | November 6, 2013 |
| 66 | 13 | "Veronica & Andrew" | Veronica and Andrew | September 12, 2013 | November 20, 2013 |

=== Season 4 ===
| Episode no. (W Network) | Episode no. (HGTV) | Title | Title | Original release date | Original air date (HGTV) |
|---|---|---|---|---|---|
HGTV Season 6
| 67 | 68 | "Maria & Dave" | Maria & Dave | January 21, 2014 | March 19, 2014 |
| 68 | 69 | "Heather & Franklin" | Heather & Franklin | January 28, 2014 | March 26, 2014 |
| 69 | 71 | "Edith & Fred" | Edith & Fred | February 4, 2014 | July 2, 2014 |
| 70 | 70 | "Melissa & Joe" | Melissa & Joe | February 11, 2014 | June 25, 2014 |
| 71 | 73 | "Sandy & Susy" | Sandy | February 18, 2014 | July 16, 2014 |
| 72 | 67 | "Chris & Mike" | Chris & Mike | February 25, 2014 | March 12, 2014 |
| 73 | 75 | "Beatriz & Brandon" | Beatriz and Brandon | March 4, 2014 | July 30, 2014 |
| 74 | 76 | "Luca, Anne & Barbara" | Anne and Luca | March 26, 2014 | August 6, 2014 |
| 75 | 77 | "Nicole & Colby" | Nicole and Colby | April 4, 2014 | August 13, 2014 |
| 76 | 78 | "Nadine & Greg" | Nadine and Greg | TBA | August 20, 2014 |
| 77 | 72 | "Stephanie & David" | Stephanie and David | TBA | July 9, 2014 |
| 78 | 79 | "Dionna & Natasha" | Dionna | TBA | August 27, 2014 |
| 79 | 74 | "Aven & Phillip" | Aven and Phillip | TBA | July 23, 2014 |
HGTV Season 7
| 80 | 1 | "A Suburban Home All On Their Own" | Belinda & Tiago | October 27, 2014 | January 7, 2015 |
| 81 | 2 | "Keeping it in the Family is Tough Competition" | Amy & Graham | TBA | January 14, 2015 |
| 82 | 3 | "Single in the City and Looking for A Deluxe Pad" | Catherine & Viviane | TBA | January 21, 2015 |
| 83 | 4 | "Squashing Sibling Rivalry by Going From Cramped to Spacious" | Krista & Jennifer | TBA | January 28, 2015 |
| 84 | 5 | "Escaping the In-Laws for a Family Functional Home" | Isabella & David | TBA | February 4, 2015 |
| 85 | 6 | "Chic and Modern Home to Entertain in Style" | Glenda & Dave | TBA | February 11, 2015 |
| 86 | 7 | "Meeting in the Middle for the Perfect Property" | Sarah & Andrew | TBA | February 18, 2015 |
| 87 | 8 | "Room to Grow in Time for a Surprise Delivery" | Jennifer & Derek | TBA | February 25, 2015 |
| 88 | 9 | "Wish List and Budget are Out of Sync" | Shannon & Daryl | TBA | March 4, 2015 |
| 89 | 10 | "She Wants a Fully-Loaded Suburban Home" | Nancy | TBA | March 11, 2015 |
| 90 | 11 | "An Urban Dream Home for Their Happily Ever After" | Samantha & Yaron | TBA | May 13, 2015 |
| 91 | 12 | "Promise of a Downtown Dream Home" | Thomas & Christine | TBA | May 20, 2015 |
| 92 | 13 | "Taking a Gamble on a Fixer-Upper" | Jessica & Chase | TBA | May 27, 2015 |

=== Season 5 ===
| Episode no. (W Network) | Episode no. (HGTV) | Title | Title | Original release date | Original air date (HGTV) |
|---|---|---|---|---|---|
HGTV Season 8
| 93 | 93 | "Suburban Reality" "Downtown Dreaming, Suburban Reality" | Diana and John | September 14, 2015 | October 7, 2015 |
| 94 | 95 | "Go Big or Go Home" "New Parents Go Big With a Blinged-Out Pad" | Katie and Justin | TBA | October 21, 2015 |
| 95 | 97 | "New Beginnings" "New Beginnings and a Forever Home for a Single Mom" | Anna | TBA | November 4, 2015 |
| 96 | 94 | "Eager for Room to Roam" "Room to Roam in Their Dream Home" | Carlie and Drum | TBA | October 14, 2015 |
| 97 | 98 | "Big Changes, Bigger Decisions" "Big Decisions for the Perfect Property" | Angela and Ro | TBA | November 11, 2015 |
| 98 | 99 | "Hoping to Get Lucky" "Hoping to Get Lucky with a Fixer-Upper" | Darren and Tory | TBA | November 18, 2015 |
| 99 | 101 | "Ready for a Home of Their Own" "Ready to Fall in Love for a Home of Their Own" | Kristen and Ben | TBA | January 6, 2016 |
| 100 | 102 | "Basement Blues" "From Basement Blues to Property Perfection" | Julie and Adam | November 9, 2015 | January 13, 2016 |
| 101 | 103 | "Competition Crazed" "Competitive Couple Is Challenged with a Reno" | Gabby and Jim | TBA | January 20, 2016 |
| 102 | 104 | "Particularly Particular" "Particularly Particular with Their Wish List" | Craig and Laurel | TBA | January 27, 2016 |
| 103 | 100 | "Independent and Ambitious" "Independent and Ambitious" | Gina | TBA | December 23, 2015 |
| 104 | 105 | "Family Time" "More Time for Family" | Bridget and Tom | TBA | February 10, 2016 |
| 105 | 96 | "Desperate to Settle" "Desperate to Settle into a Place of Their Own" | Marc and Ashleigh | TBA | October 28, 2015 |
HGTV Season 9
| 106 | 106 | "Ready to Spend" "Ready to Spend It All on a Perfect Home" | Michelle and Tom | February 17, 2016 | February 17, 2016 |
| 107 | 107 | "Relocation Woes" "Relocation Woes into Dream Home Joy" | Kevin and Suzanne | February 24, 2016 | February 24, 2016 |
| 108 | 108 | "Chasing the Suburban Dream" "Chasing the Suburban Dream Home" | Sukhvir and Beeban | March 2, 2016 | March 2, 2016 |
| 109 | 109 | "Taking the Leap" "Taking the Renovation Leap" | Pema and John | March 9, 2016 | March 9, 2016 |
| 110 | 110 | "Brothers Helping Brothers" "Brothers Helping Brothers" | Scott and Trevor | March 16, 2016 | March 16, 2016 |
| 111 | 111 | "Not Ready for the Suburbs" "Not Ready for the Suburbs" | Lexa and Peter | May 11, 2016 | May 11, 2016 |
| 112 | 112 | "Putting the 'Om' in Home" "Putting the 'Om' in Home" | Michelle and Michael | May 18, 2016 | May 18, 2016 |
| 113 | 115 | "Perfect Pair Ready for a Perfect Pad" "Perfect Pair Ready for a Perfect Pad" | Michelle and Jon | May 25, 2016 | October 19, 2016 |
| 114 | 113 | "Charming Fixer-Upper With Unexpected Issues" "Charming Fixer-Upper With Unexpected Issues" | Karima | July 25, 2016 | May 25, 2016 |
| 115 | 114 | "Dream City, Dream Job, Dream Home" "Dream City, Dream Job, Dream Home" | Levi and Alysha | August 1, 2016 | October 12, 2016 |
| 116 | 117 | "Bachelor Pad Condo to Family-Friendly Home" "Bachelor Pad Condo to Family-Friendly Home" | Erin and Adam | August 8, 2016 | October 26, 2016 |
| 117 | 116 | "Ready for Home Sweet Home" "Ready for Home Sweet Home" | Jaeme and Bliss | August 15, 2016 | October 19, 2016 |
| 118 | 118 | "Spending, Add-Ons and a Property That Fits the Bill" "Spending, Add-Ons and a Property That Fits the Bill" | Sarah and Kevin | August 22, 2016 | November 2, 2016 |

=== Season 6 ===
Season 10 only has 12 episodes (instead of 13) because the brothers declined working with a homeowner who insisted on buying a home with an unsafe foundation.

| Episode no. (W Network) | Episode no. (HGTV) | Title | Title | Original release date | Original air date (HGTV) |
|---|---|---|---|---|---|
HGTV Season 10
| 119 | 119 | "Tyler & Lindsay" "Navigating Rough Waters for a Picture Perfect Property" | Tyler and Lindsay | October 24, 2016 | November 16, 2016 |
| 120 | 120 | "Dorothy & John" "Searching for Glitz and Glam" | Dorothy and John | October 31, 2016 | December 21, 2016 |
| 121 | 121 | "Monique & Carl" "Game-Time Decision" | Monique and Carl | November 7, 2016 | December 28, 2016 |
| 122 | 122 | "Collaboration and Teamwork" "Kevin & Shirley" | Kevin and Shirley | November 14, 2016 | January 11, 2017 |
| 123 | 123 | "Barbra & Greg" "Character and Closed Concept" | Barbra and Greg | November 21, 2016 | January 18, 2017 |
| 124 | 124 | "Debra & Dan" "Modern Must-Have" | Debra and Dan | November 28, 2016 | January 25, 2017 |
| 125 | 125 | "Lizzy & Dave" "Delivering a Dream Home Just in Time" | Lizzy and Dave | March 6, 2017 | February 1, 2017 |
| 126 | 126 | "Nathan & Jessica" "Condo to Countryside" | Nathan and Jessica | March 13, 2017 | February 8, 2017 |
| 127 | 127 | "Mark & Eugenie" "Unexpected Dream Home" | Mark and Eugenie | March 20, 2017 | February 15, 2017 |
| 138 | 128 | "Sandi & Phil" "Century Home Showstopper" | Sandi and Phil | August 28, 2017 | February 22, 2017 |
| 128 | 129 | "Leslie & Tim" "Fixer-upper For Dog Lovers" | Leslie and Tim | March 27, 2017 | March 1, 2017 |
| 129 | 130 | "Kyle & Jackie" "Rustic-Meets-Modern Design" | Kyle and Jackie | April 3, 2017 | March 8, 2017 |
| 130 | 131 | "Andrew & Phil" "Modern Masterpiece for Two" | Andrew and Phil | April 10, 2017 | March 15, 2017 |
HGTV Season 11
| 131 | 132 | "Emily & Ken" "Hunting for the One" | Emily and Ken | April 17, 2017 | October 11, 2017 |
| 139 | 133 | "Tom & TJ" "Building a Solid Foundation" | Tom and TJ | January 22, 2018 | October 18, 2017 |
The brothers try to combine a Nashville couple's different wish lists, but an unexpectedly high sale price for the century-old house the couple picks gives Jonathan little room for unexpected surprises in the renovation.
| 141 | 134 | "Kristen & Kacy" "Big City Move" | Kristen | February 5, 2018 | October 25, 2017 |
A busy woman with imaginative tastes pulls up stakes and moves to Nashville, finding a home she loves—but one with many issues.
| 132 | 135 | "Amanda & Tre" "Lakeside Dreaming" | Amanda and Tre | April 24, 2017 | November 1, 2017 |
| 133 | 136 | "George & Jenn" "Miles Apart" | George and Jenn | May 1, 2017 | November 8, 2017 |
| 134 | 137 | "Rave & Michelle" "Craving More Space for the Family" | Rave and Michelle | May 8, 2017 | November 15, 2017 |
| 135 | 138 | "Marc & Stephanie" "Changing Direction" | Marc and Stephanie | May 15, 2017 | December 27, 2017 |
| 136 | 139 | "Sophie & Tim" "Honeymooning and House Hunting" | Sophie and Tim | May 22, 2017 | January 3, 2018 |
| 137 | 140 | "Katie & Michael" "Straightening Out a Sagging Century Home" | Katie and Michael | May 29, 2017 | January 10, 2018 |
| 140 | 141 | "Maureen & David" "A Different Dream" | Maureen | January 29, 2018 | January 17, 2018 |
A recently widowed young mother adjusts to her new life by selling her Nashville dream home and searching for a more manageable space.
| 142 | 142 | "Carson & Leah" "Overcoming Analysis Paralysis" | Carson | February 12, 2018 | January 24, 2018 |
The brothers take on perhaps their toughest client: a perfectionist pharmacist who has compiled a literal book of design ideas.
| 143 | 143 | "Karen & Rick" "Shaky Start" | Karen and Rick | February 19, 2018 | January 31, 2018 |
Empty nesters with four young grandsons take a chance on a home that's been on the market for two years, but the renovation hits a major snag from the start.
| 144 | 144 | "Jessie & Joe" "Making Their House a Home" | Jessie and Joe | February 26, 2018 | February 7, 2018 |
A family of four that outgrew its condo finds a place that meets its needs, but many unexpected issues arise in the renovation.
HGTV Season 12
| 145 | 145 | "Nicole & Matt" "Costly Charm for a Vintage Dreamer" | Nicole | March 5, 2018 | February 14, 2018 |
An up-and-coming musician in Nashville wants a home with vintage charm, and it's up to the brothers to fulfill her wishes without blowing past her budget.
| 146 | 146 | "Sandy & Patrick" "Searching for the Heart of the Home" | Sandy and Patrick | March 12, 2018 | February 21, 2018 |
A couple relocates from Wisconsin to Nashville for the husband's dream job, and would like a midcentury home that can be renovated to include space for the wife's aging father.
| 147 | 147 | "Carolyn & Brad" "Mad About Plaid" | Carolyn and Brad | March 19, 2018 | February 28, 2018 |
A family who's been living with one set of parents is now ready for its own home... but the dream house runs into snags thanks to unique personal tastes and many costly surprises.
| 148 | 148 | "Ryan & Julie" "Family Above All Else" | Ryan and Julie | March 26, 2018 | March 7, 2018 |
A young couple who moved to Nashville to be closer to family wants to find a place of their own, and do so—but have trouble deciding on a design.
| 149 | 149 | "Aben & Ashley" "Striking the Right Chord" | Aben and Ashley | April 2, 2018 | March 14, 2018 |
A couple with a baby looks for a home near Music Row, but after they decide on a property, a bulging basement wall threatens everything.

=== Season 7 ===
| Episode no. (W Network) | Episode no. (HGTV) | Title | Title | Original release date | Original air date (HGTV) | Viewers (millions) |
|---|---|---|---|---|---|---|
HGTV Season 12
| 150 | 150 | "Janna & Jason" "Expecting the Unexpected" | Janna and Jason | September 3, 2018 | March 21, 2018 | N/A |
Newlyweds with widely differing personal aesthetics find a fixer-upper in Toronto... and three weeks into the renovation, Janna finds she's pregnant, leading to major changes in plans.
| 151 | 151 | "Patrick & Julie" "Floored by the Renovation" | Patrick and Julie | September 10, 2018 | March 28, 2018 | N/A |
After an agonizing search, a couple with distinctive personal requirements finally finds a new home, but it requires significant renovation on a budget.
| 152 | 152 | "Carolyn & Gerald" "Country Chic for a New Generation" | Carolyn and Gerald | September 17, 2018 | April 11, 2018 | N/A |
A couple nearing retirement wants to move from their rural Ontario farmhouse to a less isolated place, and finds that Carolyn's childhood home is now empty and available but needs major work.
| 154 | 153 | "David & Eleni" "Uplift and Electrify" | Eleni and Dave | October 1, 2018 | April 18, 2018 | N/A |
A young family wants plenty of room for their kids and a big garage for car aficionado Dave, but don't have the budget for all of their wishes before a pleasant mid-renovation surprise.
| TBA | 154 | "Tight Transformation" | Pat and Tania | TBA | April 25, 2018 | TBD |
A couple with young twins finds a suitable home after a long search, but the renovation budget is strained when they have to offer considerably more than the listing price.
| 155 | 155 | "Mistress of Her Domain" | Beverley | October 15, 2018 | May 2, 2018 | N/A |
A woman who initially wants out of her current house decides she can live with the house if Jonathan can transform it.
| 153 | 156 | "Johanna & Sean" "Wishful Building" | Johanna and Sean | September 24, 2018 | May 9, 2018 | N/A |
A family that has moved four times in the last decade has saved enough to buy a place to settle down, but has a huge wish list.
| 156 | 157 | "The High Cost of Cool" | Dereck and Christine | October 22, 2018 | August 29, 2018 | N/A |
A couple moves from a cramped downtown condo, finding a midcentury fixer-upper... complete with asbestos and structural issues that add renovation challenges.
| 157 | 158 | "Structural Opportunity" | Denise and Massimo | October 29, 2018 | September 5, 2018 | N/A |
A couple with a toddler and a newborn is ready to get out of its small high-rise space, and the brothers find an older detached home close to the couple's family with several surprises, both good and bad.
| 158 | 159 | "Reno Interrupted" | Janna and Larry | November 5, 2018 | September 12, 2018 | N/A |
After an abandoned renovation attempt, a couple with a toddler, now squeezed into the wife's parents' home, seeks another fixer-upper... until the brothers persuade them that they would be better off resuming the original renovation.
HGTV Season 13
| TBA | 160 | "Designing Memories" | Mark and Katie | November 12, 2018 | September 19, 2018 | N/A |
Drew has difficulty finding a house that fits a quirky couple; several obstacles in the renovation create challenges for Jonathan.
| TBA | 161 | "Wide Open Dreams" | Jennifer and David | TBA | September 26, 2018 | TBD |
The brothers find a home that can accommodate a young family of four, including a special-needs child who can't climb stairs.
| TBA | 162 | "Color Clash" | Lesli and Dave | TBA | October 3, 2018 | TBD |
A couple who have moved eight times in 15 years now want to put down roots in Nashville, but face a series of tough decisions.
| TBA | 163 | "Living in Harmony" | Leanne and Jordan | TBA | December 5, 2018 | TBD |
A Nashville couple who live and work in a two-bedroom shack need more space, but a limited budget and the couple's differing personal needs challenge the brothers.
| TBA | 164 | "Sister, Sister" | Sonja | TBA | December 12, 2018 | TBD |
A Nashville woman wants a bigger house to entertain her sister and her family, but has very strong design opinions.
| TBA | 165 | "Family Fun House" | Susy and Scott | TBA | December 19, 2018 | TBD |
A family of five is crowded into a hotel room when their previous home sells faster than expected, with the brothers facing a time-compressed renovation.
| TBA | 166 | "Making Momma Happy" | Danny and LaShawnda | TBA | December 26, 2018 | TBD |
The brothers take on a major renovation of a home that has been in a Nashville couple's family for generations.
| TBA | 167 | "Renovation Therapy" | Kat and Ryan | TBA | January 2, 2019 | TBD |
A Nashville couple with two children, squeezed into the husband's bachelor pad, want a bigger place.
| TBA | 168 | "Cool Under Pressure" | Carrie and Raza | TBA | January 9, 2019 | TBD |
A laid-back couple with very different design tastes want to move from the wife's cramped cottage into a bigger house that can please them both.
| TBA | 169 | "Home with a View" | Carol and John | TBA | January 16, 2019 | TBD |
The brothers work with a couple with one must-have: a view of Old Hickory Lake.
| TBA | 170 | "A Little Bit of Home" | Brian and Angie | TBA | January 30, 2019 | TBD |
A couple with three teenagers who have moved 10 times in 15 years are ready to put down roots.
HGTV Season 14
| TBA | 171 | "Mountain Chic" | Shauna and Steve | September 23, 2019 | February 6, 2019 | N/A |
A Calgary family of four, crowded into the wife's mother's home, want to stay nearby, but face a tight market, followed by a challenging renovation.
| TBA | 172 | "Cheer-tastic Design" | Robin | September 30, 2019 | February 13, 2019 | N/A |
A newly single mother with three children heavily involved with gymnastics and cheerleading needs plenty of space on a budget, and wants it close to her parents' home.
| TBA | 173 | "The Homesick Cure" | Nathan and Natalia | October 7, 2019 | February 27, 2019 | N/A |
| TBA | 174 | "From Fault to Vault" | Allison and Ryan | October 21, 2019 | March 13, 2019 | N/A |

== Specials ==
| Episode no. (W Network) | Episode no. (HGTV) | Title | Title | Original release date | Original air date (HGTV) |
|---|---|---|---|---|---|
| 1 | 1 | "Property Brothers: 100 Episodes & Counting" | "100th Episode Special" | November 9, 2015 | January 20, 2016 |
The brothers hosted an hour-long special ahead of its 100th episode. The special highlighted their favourite moments from the preceding 99 episodes, and was accompanied by the release of the Property Brothers Handbook, a mobile app that includes design tips, multimedia from the show, and "inspirational photos".
| 2 | 2 | TBA | "Room to Roam Revisit" | TBA | January 20, 2016 |
| TBA | 3 | TBA | "Property Brothers Hall of Fame" | TBA | November 28, 2018 |
