= Carol Klimpel =

Canadian swimmer (born 1963)

Personal information
- Full name: Carol Klimpel
- National team: Canada
- Born: March 30, 1963 (age 63) Toronto, Ontario
- Height: 1.73 m (5 ft 8 in)
- Weight: 63 kg (139 lb)

Sport
- Sport: Swimming
- Strokes: Freestyle
- Club: SS Aquatic Club
Medal record
Women's swimming
Representing Canada
Pan American Games
Silver medal – second place	1979 San Juan	4×100 m freestyle
Silver medal – second place	1983 Caracas	4×100 m freestyle
Commonwealth Games
Gold medal – first place	1978 Edmonton	100 m freestyle
Gold medal – first place	1978 Edmonton	4×100 m freestyle
Gold medal – first place	1978 Edmonton	4×100 m medley

Carol Klimpel (born March 30, 1963) is a female former freestyle swimmer from Canada, who was chosen to represent her native country at the 1980 Summer Olympics in Moscow, but did not participate because of the United States-led boycott. She did compete at the 1984 Summer Olympics in Los Angeles, and won a silver medal at the 1979 Pan American Games with the women's relay team. At the 1978 Commonwealth Games, she won gold medals in the 100-metre freestyle and 4×100-metre freestyle and 4×100-metre medley relays.

In 2019 Klimpel and her husband John appeared on the home show Property Brothers featuring their purchase and remodelling of a lakefront house on Old Hickory Lake near Nashville, Tennessee.
