= Jonathan Scott (television personality) =

Canadian television personality (born 1978)

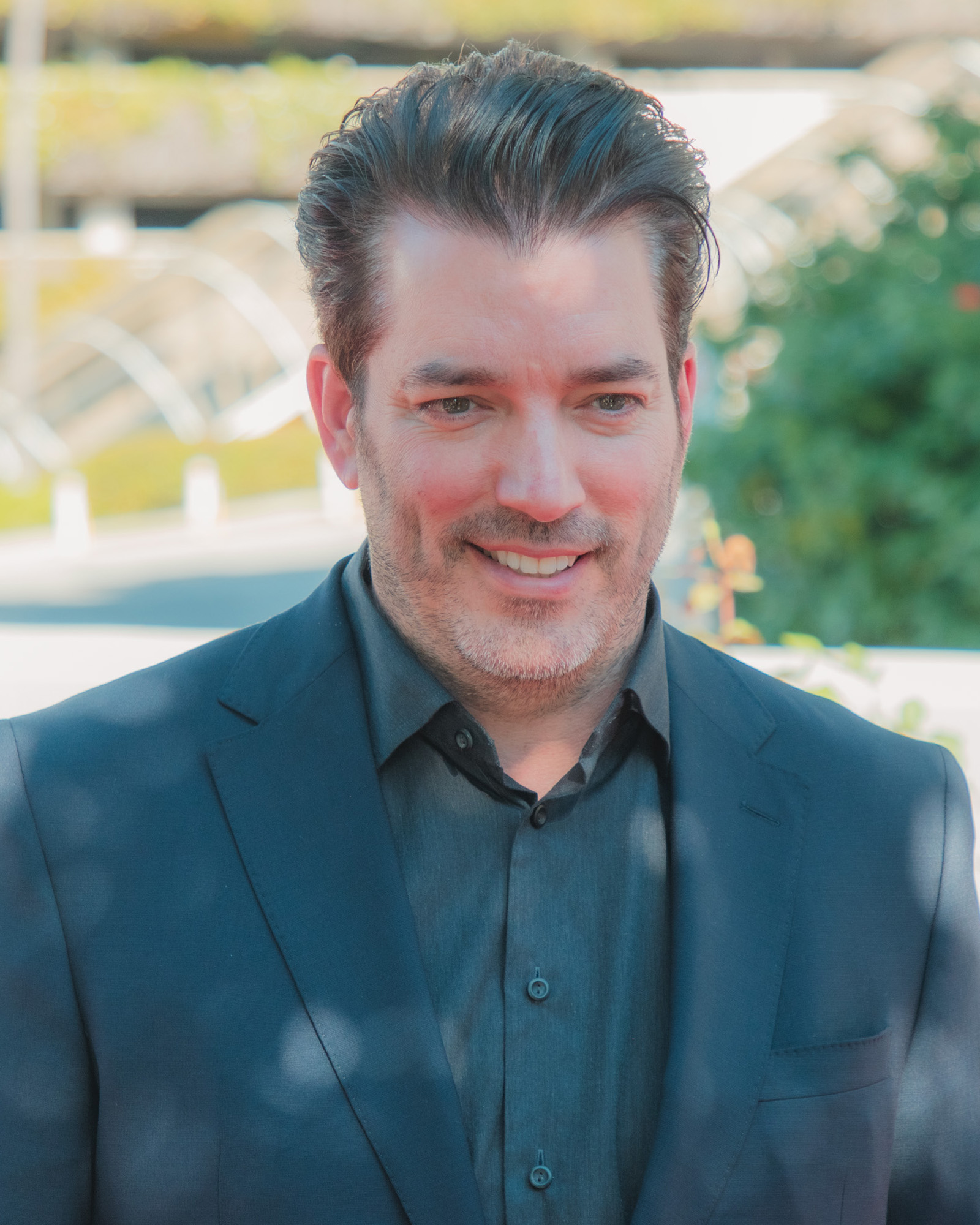
- Scott in 2026
- Born: John Ian Scott; 28 April 1978 (age 48); Vancouver, British Columbia, Canada
- Education: Southern Alberta Institute of Technology
- Known for: Property Brothers franchise
- Height: 1.95 m (6 ft 5 in)
- Spouse: Kelsy Ully (m. 2007; div. 2013)
- Partner(s): Zooey Deschanel (2019–present; engaged)
- Relatives: Drew Scott (identical twin brother)
- Website: www.drewandjonathan.com

Jonathan Silver Scott (born 28 April 1978) is a Canadian television personality, construction contractor, interior designer, and television and film producer.

He is best known as the co-host, with his twin brother Drew, of the TV series Property Brothers, as well as the program's spin-offs such as Buying and Selling, Brother Vs. Brother, Forever Homes and Property Brothers: At Home, which are broadcast in the U.S. on HGTV. Scott is also co-founder and executive producer of Scott Brothers Entertainment, which creates TV, film, and digital content for North American and international broadcasters. The brothers have written a home-improvement how-to book, a memoir, and children's books about construction. In 2020, they released a magazine related to their brand, called Reveal. Keeping with their brand, the twins have launched the home goods line Scott Living and its extension, Dream Homes—a consulting and construction firm for luxury home upgrades.

Jonathan studied performance magic since childhood and, through college and until his career in television began, he performed illusions professionally, eventually relocating to Las Vegas. He and Drew have released two country singles as the group The Scott Brothers. He lives in Las Vegas, Nevada, in a home he co-owns with Drew, who lives in Beverly Hills, California.

== Early life ==
Jonathan Scott was born John Ian Scott on 28 April 1978, four minutes before his twin brother Drew, in Vancouver, British Columbia. He has an older brother, JD, and is the second son of Jim and Joanne Scott. Jim had fostered dreams of being a cowboy as he had seen on television, and so emigrated from Scotland to Canada as a teenager. He worked in the film industry as an actor, stuntman, and assistant director until the late 1970s. It was around that time when he decided to focus on raising his family, and they moved to a horse farm in the nearby town of Maple Ridge, British Columbia. James worked as a youth counselor, and Joanne continued her career as a paralegal in downtown Vancouver. On their seventh birthday, their father encouraged the twins to get jobs. They looked through the help wanted ads, but ultimately started a business with their mother called JAM (for Jon, Andrew, and Mom) making nylon-wrapped clothes hangers. In interviews, they have recalled selling them door to door, eventually selling thousands to a woman who sold American paraphernalia in Japan.

The boys' continued job search led them to an ad recruiting child clowns to perform in parades. After completing classes with the local parks and recreation department, they were hired at C$10 a gig, eventually making as much as $100 per hour. Jonathan eventually grew tired of making himself up, and began to transition as a performer. As a child, he had seen a magic show one New Year's Eve that inspired him, and by the age of 10, he was making his own magic props; by 15 he was using a barn as a workshop to create large-scale illusions. He studied the definitive volumes of Tarbell Course in Magic, and sought out professional illusionists David Wilson and Shawn Farquhar, who became mentors and friends. He joined the Vancouver Magic Circle and the International Brotherhood of Magicians, and over the next decade he won several awards, including 3rd Best Stage Performer of the Pacific Coast Association of Magicians at 16.

James would commonly renovate the family properties and paid the boys when they were as young as eight to build and repair fences, decks and barns. Even as children, the twins would often rearrange the furniture in their family home. At 14, Jonathan and his father moved to Alberta, where they began building the parents' dream house. He spent his grade 10 year there. It is during that period that he took Jonathan Silver as a stage name, using it privately as well. After his grades declined, Jonathan moved back to Maple Ridge to complete high school, returning to Alberta during school breaks with his family and best friend Pedro to assist in the construction.

The boys attended Thomas Haney Secondary School and, while they both played on the basketball and volleyball teams, Jonathan gravitated more to theater and clubs, where he was president of various committees including student government and the graduation committee. After graduation, the family moved into their newly built home, just as the twins were leaving for Calgary to go to university.

== Career ==
=== Early career ===
After graduation Scott enrolled at the University of Calgary, majoring in business management. Despite having an interest in going into entertainment, the twins did not want to be "starving artists". After researching the topic, and getting advice from their mother's legal firm, they thought real estate would "ease the financial purgatory of being out-of-work actors". During their first semester in university, using a vendor take-back mortgage, they made a $250 down payment and purchased a seven-bedroom property across the street from their university. They cleaned and repaired it, and sublet the remaining five rooms for a profit of $800 a month. They sold the house a year later at a $50,000 profit. They continued to purchase and "flip" homes at large margins by making only modest repairs themselves, sometimes living in the homes they were renovating.

At 19, Scott moved to Vancouver and began to build large-scale illusions with the goal of eventually developing a touring theater show. While he was looking for a management company to work with, a fellow magician claiming to be a friend of a friend who was out of the country approached him. After negotiations, Scott agreed to rent him several of his illusions; the man stole the entire production, effectively destroying the show and leaving Scott $80,000 in debt. Even after a successful lawsuit, Scott was unable to collect what he was owed. Depressed and embarrassed, he did not tell his parents about what had happened, and filed for bankruptcy—a decision he regrets. Drew convinced Jonathan to join him as a flight attendant at WestJet, at the time a small, startup airline, allowing them more time to dedicate to flipping houses.

Scott transferred to the Southern Alberta Institute of Technology and the Professional Home Builders Institute to study construction and design, and became licensed as a contractor. In those roles, the twins renovated and sold properties for 15 years. Along the way, they supported themselves with a string of jobs that included busboy, mall security guard, flight attendant, store manager, and website designer. Still planning to pursue careers in entertainment, the twins and their older brother co-founded an independent film production company, Dividian Production Group, in 2002.

When your business partner tells you he's leaving the province, you freak out. We'd never had this kind of money or success, and you want to move away and do acting?

— Scott to Entrepreneur magazine

After several negative experiences with real estate brokers, Drew became a licensed realtor, and Jonathan acquired his own license soon after. That same year, the twins founded Scott Real Estate Inc., a company to provide clients with a "one stop shop" for services in the buying, selling, and renovation of homes, as well as in design consulting and staging open houses. In January 2006, however, Drew moved to Vancouver and gave himself a year to pursue his acting career in earnest. As the year came to a close, he took out a license in Vancouver, and opened a Scott Real Estate branch there. Scott remained in Calgary to run the business alone, sometimes working as many as 18 hours a day. He married his fiancée in July 2007.

Before getting married, Scott and his wife had regularly visited Las Vegas, drawn to the city's live entertainment scene. When the American real estate market collapsed in 2008, Scott saw an opportunity to buy cheap properties in the U.S., where the recession was further along. Convincing JD to come with them, Scott and his wife left for Las Vegas that December, making their home in the nearby suburb of Summerlin, Nevada. Scott opened a third branch of Scott Real Estate and, considering the depressed market, switched to leasing properties, but at only 80 percent of market rates, to help renters who were recovering from the ongoing recession. At the same time, the move to Las Vegas put him in proximity to live venues and opportunities to perform magic. He began to explore ways to revive his career as an illusionist, at least on a part-time basis.

=== Transition to television (2009–present) ===
In Vancouver, Drew was offered an audition for a show called Realtor Idol, based on the American Idol format. The show never materialized, but when the producers learned he had a brother who was a contractor, they developed a show around the pair tentatively called My Dream Home; that company would later film the pilot for Property Brothers. Multiple North American networks turned down the show before it was picked up for a full season by the W Network in Canada. After becoming the number-one-rated show on the network, HGTV (under Scripps Networks Interactive) signed on as a distributor, having previously passed on the show. Meanwhile, the twins delegated their private clients to colleagues in their network of brokers and trade professionals, and Scott put his magic aspirations on hold.

In 2010, Dividian Production Group became Scott Brothers Entertainment, and the brothers expanded it into a TV, film, and digital production company with offices in the U.S. and Canada. The success of Property Brothers spawned several spinoffs, including Buying and Selling (2012 – present) and Brother vs. Brother (2013 – present). By 2014, the shows' combined viewership was more than 26 million. As their filming schedule grew, they stopped accepting private clients. The franchise has since expanded to include other one-off series like Brothers Take New Orleans and the 2016 web series In the Scott Seat.

The twins decided to sell their homes and jointly purchase a property in 2011, with the goal of establishing a hub for their extended family and friends. Scott, now separated from his wife, began searching for a place that met all of their criteria (primarily within 20 minutes of the airport), and they ultimately purchased a foreclosed house for $400,000. Scott moved in first, living alone for three years before they began improvements. With a renovation budget of US$2 million, the project became the basis of a fourth television series, Property Brothers: At Home. It was also the first production under the umbrella of Scott Brothers Entertainment. The show premiered in 2014 in the United States, as well as in 2015 on the W Network in Canada. With the success of Property Brothers: At Home, in 2015, Scott and his brothers created another spin-off series called Property Brothers: At Home on the Ranch; they returned to Alberta to complete a 10-week renovation on a family friend's Rocky Mountain estate. Scott co-starred in the series' third installment, Property Brothers at Home: Drew's Honeymoon House, a five-episode chronicle of Drew and his fiancée, Linda Phan, remodeling their home in Los Angeles. It premiered in November 2017. Jonathan also appeared in Drew and Linda Say I Do, the June 2018 TLC special that chronicled Drew's wedding. Jonathan delivered a tearful, widely reported on best man speech.

Property Brothers: Forever Home debuted on 28 May 2019, an addition to the franchise that focuses on upgrading people's current homes. A Very Brady Renovation, a program about the brothers' restoration of the home used on the 1970s program The Brady Bunch, premiered 9 September 2019.

== Other projects ==
In 2013, the twins and their brother JD hosted the radio show Off Topic with the Scott Brothers for Canada's Corus Entertainment. The twins also appeared on a 2016 episode of the NPR radio show Wait Wait... Don't Tell Me!.

In 2015, the twins created an outdoor furniture line called Scott Living that launched on QVC. It has since expanded to include indoor offerings, and their products are available at retailers including Lowe's, Costco, Orchard, and Bed Bath & Beyond. By the end of 2016, the brand had revenues of over $100 million. Dream Homes (an extension of the brand), designs high-end, customized architecture and home elements for homeowners with budgets in the millions of dollars. Every aspect can be customized, and a team of designers based in Las Vegas provide design ideas. Clients ask for features like "a helipad, a 20-car garage, or a million-dollar theater room".

The twins have been sought out as experts in their fields and are invited to lectures and workshops as guest speakers to provide insight on the real estate business. Scott is a vocal proponent of renewable energy; around 2000, he converted his home to run on wind energy; his current home in Las Vegas runs on solar energy. In December 2016, Scott participated in the sixth annual 24 Hours of Reality broadcast, advocating for the repeal of laws that discourage residential solar power installation. That same year, he began work on a documentary series about the energy landscape in North America, emphasizing the viability of solar energy. The twins have also accepted invitations to such notable events as the Realscreen Summit, CES, and RootsTech. On 9 August 2019, Jonathan released an ebook called Knowledge is Power in conjunction with The Climate Reality Project that explains how consumers can integrate solar power into residential building projects.

They are also regulars on the talk show circuit, often to promote their latest ventures, and have appeared on shows including: Jimmy Kimmel Live!, Chelsea, and Today. Great American Country's end-of-the-year Top 50 Country Countdown reached out to the twins to host the annual program on 22 December 2013. The twins appeared as chef's table guests in the 16th season of Hell's Kitchen. Drew sat with Melissa Rivers in the blue kitchen, while Jonathan sat with Ashley Greene in the red kitchen. The twins designed a house for the models on America's Next Top Model.

The brothers hosted a Carnival cruise called Sailing with the Scotts in November 2015, and December 2018. They wrote their first book, Dream Home, in 2015; It was released the next April, debuting at ninth on The New York Times Best Seller list for advice/how-to books, and third on the Wall Street Journal Best-Selling Books list for nonfiction. The twins appeared in the first five episodes of the web series Tiny House Arrest, produced by their production company, which debuted in January 2016.

They released their second book, It Takes Two: Our Story, a memoir, in September 2017. In a March 2018 interview, Jonathan revealed that he and Drew had written an illustrated children's book, Builder Brothers: Big Plans. It was released by HarperCollins in October 2018, including a building project that children can complete with an adult. The sequel, Builder Brothers: Better Together, was released in the Fall of 2019. Both brothers were invited to appear on the 25th season of Dancing with the Stars. Scott declined saying he "physically couldn't do it with all of [his] construction projects", so Drew appeared without him. Scott surprised the audience by joining Drew's jive performance, mid-routine, in an October episode.

=== Music ===
As part of At Home on the Ranch, the twins sang and recorded (for the first time as The Scott Brothers) two country singles. The first, "Hold On", premiered during the third episode of the series, and "Let the Night Shine In" debuted during the fourth. Both tracks were co-written by the twins and Nashville songwriters Victoria Shaw and Chad Carlson. "Hold On" hit number 38 on Billboard's Hot Country Songs chart and was accompanied by a music video that has more than 5 million views on Vevo. Jonathan performed "Hold On" at the Country Music Association's celebration of music education in New Orleans in September 2016.

The songs opened the door for Jonathan and Drew to be invited as guest presenters at the Grand Ole Opry in March 2016, and they hosted the Friday night Nissan Stadium show of the Country Music Association (CMA) Music Fest 2016. On 12 January 2017, The Scott Brothers released a third song, "My House", featuring Eric Paslay, and announced that all of the proceeds would be donated to St. Jude Children's Research Hospital. The song's accompanying music video was filmed at the twins' home in Las Vegas and features various celebrity cameos, including Carrot Top, Lindsay Ell, and RaeLynn.

=== Acting ===
The Scotts' high school drama teacher used her connections to get them small TV roles, including in a Molson Canadian commercial that aired during the Grey Cup. Scott also appeared on the teen comedy Breaker High and the X-Files. He sat on the executive board for ACTRA (the Canadian equivalent of SAG-AFTRA) for years. Scott has caught the attention of the producers of The Bachelor, but he turned down three separate offers to be on the show (twice in the US and once in Canada), saying that being on the show would give him "so much anxiety." To publicize the 2013 release of Bob Dylan's 35-album box set, a new video for "Like a Rolling Stone" was released on Dylan's website. The twins were invited to be among those lip-synching the lyrics. The twins played themselves in the USA Network comedy Playing House in 2015.

=== Magic ===
Ever since I was a kid and watched magicians on stage, like David Copperfield or Siegfried and Roy, I instantly knew how they did everything. In my head, it just all worked.

— Scott in Glamour magazine

Scott considers David Copperfield an inspiration, and first saw him perform in Vancouver at age 12. He met him often after moving to Nevada. As an adult, Scott has performed shows in Las Vegas, including at Murray SawChuck's show at the Laugh Factory. He occasionally performs tricks during media appearances or for charity events. He has been a member of the International Brotherhood of Magicians for more than 20 years, and has created illusions for other magicians in Las Vegas. He has expressed his desire to pursue magic as a career again.

They are set to appear in a second season episode of the comedy series Girls5eva.

== Public image ==
The Scott brothers are known for their sense of humor and playful sibling rivalry. In contrast with Drew (who is often in formal wear), contractor Jonathan is more casual, or the "rugged, flannel-shirt-outfitted half". He is also partial to plaid. Drew has referred to his brother's aesthetic as "slow-motion renovation in tight jeans". Both men stand over 6 ft 4 in (1.93 m) tall.

The twins have become sex symbols. ET Canada included them on its Hottest Bachelor list in 2011. The twins made People's list of Men of the Year in 2014, its 50 Most Beautiful People issue in both 2013 and 2014, and its Sexiest Man Alive issue in 2013, 2014 and 2017. They were number 13 on Hello! Canada's Most Beautiful List of 2014. BuzzFeed included them on their 2015 list of HGTV's 15 All-Time Hottest Hotties. They garnered the second-largest crowd ever at Mall of America, second only to the British boy band One Direction.

HGTV has recognized their status, saying: "We know that twin brothers and HGTV fan favorites Drew and Jonathan Scott are good-looking, talented and ever-so-popular with the ladies." Kathleen Finch, the president of HGTV, has called the twins "the cable equivalent of box-office movie stars". After the debut of Brother Vs. Brother, Glamour wrote, "Yes, we've all always harbored massive crushes on the twins, but let's just say they are taking their sex appeal to all new levels—ripped-shirts, greased-muscles, water-sprayed levels of hotness."

Scott has sizable followings on various social media platforms, including Twitter, Facebook, Instagram, Snapchat, and Periscope, where he universally uses the handle "MrSilverScott". Mashable even called him a "master" at social media. With brother Drew, he created videos on the now-defunct platform Vine. The two worked with famous "Viners" including Vincent Marcus, Manon Mathews, Sara Hopkins, BrittleStar, NeatDude, and Gregor Reynolds. People named one of his Vines, of the twins doing pull-ups, a Vine of the Day.

== Philanthropy ==
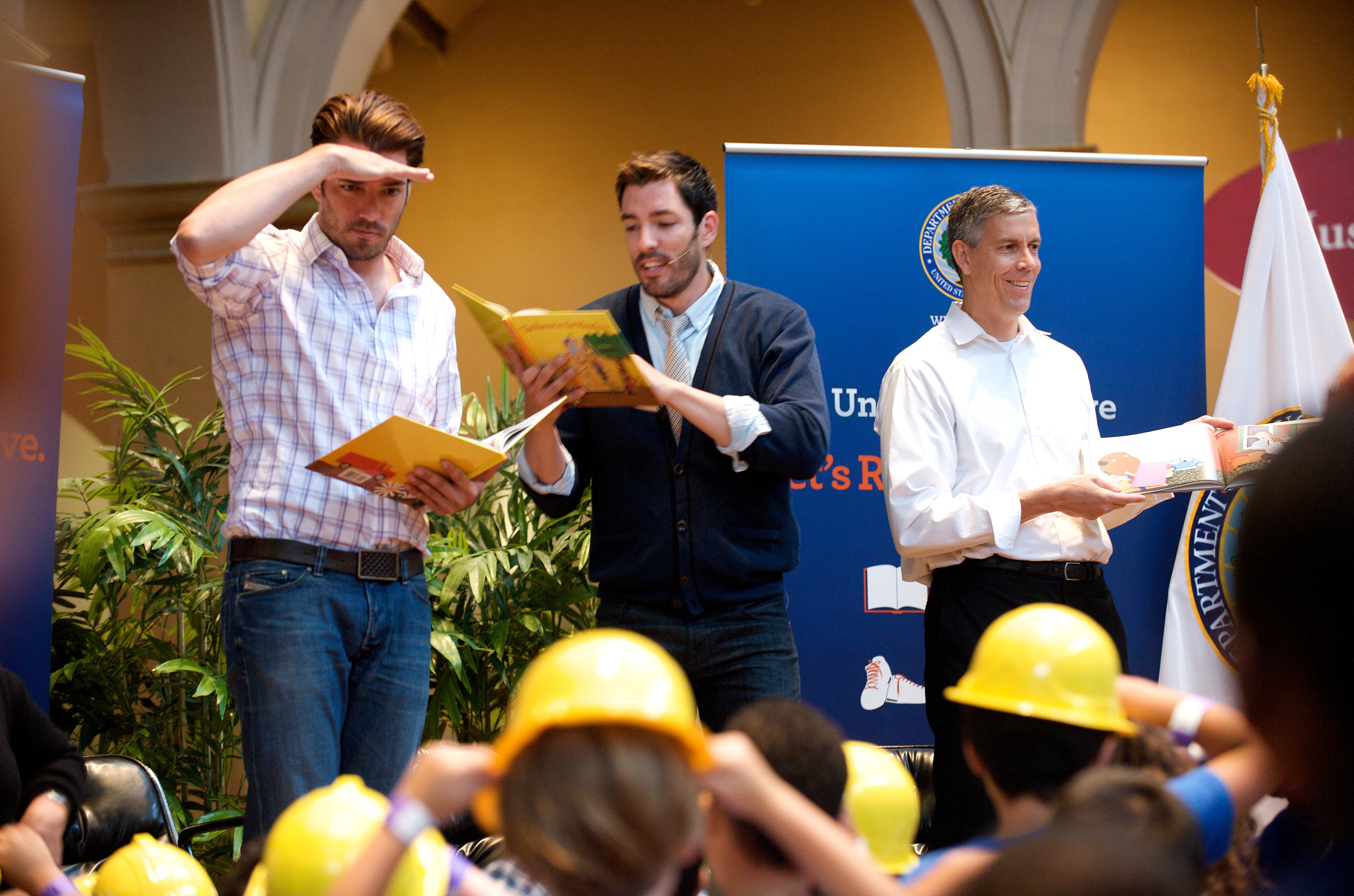
Jonathan and Drew Scott reading to children at the Let's Read Let's Move event in 2013

Scott is actively involved in youth initiatives, having performed magic for children in a hospital's oncology ward, raised money for St. Jude Children's Research Hospital, and partnered with former US First Lady Michelle Obama on her 5th Annual "Let's Read Let's Move" campaign. Designed to encourage children to be more active, the twins' involvement in the campaign included reading to more than 100 underprivileged children and leading them in an obstacle course. With his brothers, he is also a global ambassador for World Vision Canada, a Christian relief, development and advocacy organization. The three brothers went to New Delhi and visited slums as part of their commitment to No Child For Sale, which targets the fight against child labour and trafficking. They participated with Target for a school library makeover, which seeks to "remodel school libraries to ignite a love of reading and help put more children on the path to graduation". They also support pediatric cancer research through St. Baldrick's Foundation.

Jonathan has collaborated with the network of artists involved in Paul Haggis' Artists for Peace and Justice, a nonprofit organization that supports communities in Haiti through programs in education and health. In November 2017, Habitat for Humanity selected both brothers for its highest honor, Habitat Humanitarians. According to the organization, the honor was "in recognition and furtherance of their dedication to Habitat for Humanity's vision of a world where everyone has a decent place to live".

== Personal life ==
Scott has two small dogs, Gracie and Stewie, whom he calls his "kids". In an interview with People, he said he wanted to have children before he was age 45, adding that he would adopt if he is not in a relationship.

While filming the first season of Property Brothers, Jonathan said he became depressed, not socializing for over six months, which Drew helped him through. The twins, along with their brother JD, maintain a "no B.S." policy that means they are always honest with each other when something bothers them, and then try to move on from it; they credit this with helping them get along.

Scott appeared in a Nevada political ad supporting an amendment to the Nevada constitution that would have deregulated the state's energy market.

=== Relationships ===
In the summer of 2007, Scott married long-time girlfriend Kelsy Ully, a WestJet crew scheduler. After they moved to Las Vegas, he wrote later, her model/waitress job at a day club damaged their relationship. They separated in 2010, and eventually divorced.

From 2016 to April 2018, he dated Jacinta Kuznetsov, a Canadian radio producer.

In an interview with HollywoodLife, Scott revealed that he and Zooey Deschanel had started dating after meeting on an August 2019 segment of Carpool Karaoke. The announcement came one week after Deschanel announced that she and her husband, Jacob Pechenik, were divorcing. Scott and Deschanel announced their engagement on 14 August 2023.

== Awards ==
After being nominated in 2011, the twins won the 2012 Leo Award (the awards program for the British Columbia film and television industry) for Best Host(s) in an Information or Lifestyle Series for Property Brothers. In 2012, they were nominated for a Rose d'Or award, an award in entertainment broadcasting and programming, in the lifestyle show category. Property Brothers was nominated for Outstanding Structured Reality Program at the 2015 Emmy Awards.

== Movies and TV shows ==
=== Television ===
Year	Title	Role	Notes	Ref.
1994	The X-Files	Blue Beret	Uncredited; 1 Episode	
1998	Breaker High	Angry Student	Episode: "Chile Dog"	
1999	Atomic Train	Injured Citizen	2 Episodes	
2011 – 2019	Property Brothers	Himself		
2012 – 2019	Buying and Selling	Himself		
2012	Pumpkin Wars	Himself		
2013 – present	Brother Vs. Brother	Himself		
2014	Property Brothers: At Home	Himself		
2015	Playing House	Himself	Episode: "Sleepless in Pinebrook"	
2015	America's Next Top Model	Himself	Episode: "The Girl Who Walks Away"	
2015	Property Brothers: At Home on the Ranch	Himself		
2015	All-Star Gingerbread Build	Himself		
2016	All-Star Halloween Spectacular	Himself		
2016	Brothers Take New Orleans	Himself		
2016	Hell's Kitchen	Himself	Chef's table guest diner for the red team; Episode: "Dancing in the Grotto"	
2017	My Brother, My Brother and Me	Himself	Episode: "Dorms & Ghoulsmashing"	
2017 – present	Home to Win	Himself		
2017	Property Brothers at Home: Drew's Honeymoon House	Himself		
2018	Drew and Linda Say I Do	Himself		
2019 – present	Property Brothers: Forever Home	Himself		
2019	A Very Brady Renovation	Himself		
2020-2022	Making it Home with Kortney and Kenny	Executive Producer	30 Episodes	
2020 – 2023	Celebrity IOU	Executive Producer	32 Episodes	
2022	Trixie Motel	Executive Producer	8 Episodes	
2022	Girls5eva	Himself	Episode: "Tour Mode"	
2023	Saturday Night Live	Himself		
2023	Builder Brothers Dream Factory	Executive Producer	10 Episodes	
2024	House Hunters	Executive Producer	3 Episodes	
2024	Trixie Motel: Drag Me Home	Executive Producer	4 Episodes	

== Discography ==
(credited as The Scott Brothers)

- "Let the Night Shine In" (SB Records, 24 November 2015)
- "Hold On" (SB Records, 10 February 2016)
- "Home" (SB Records, 16 May 2016)
- "My House" (SB Records, 2017) – cover of the Flo Rida song of the same name

== Publications ==
- Dream Home: The Property Brothers' Ultimate Guide to Finding & Fixing Your Perfect House (2016)
- It Takes Two: Our Story (2017)
- Builder Brothers: Big Plans (2018)
- Builder Brothers: Better Together (2019)
- Knowledge is Power (2019)

== See also ==
- Andy Kane
- Hilary Farr
- Thom Filicia
- Ty Pennington
