= World Vision Canada =

Canadian non-profit organization

- Founded: 1957
- Founder: Robert Pierce
- Type: Non-Government Organization
- Purpose: Helping children, families and communities overcome poverty and injustice.
- Location: Mississauga, Ontario
- Region served: 90+ countries
- Method: Transformational Development through emergency relief, community development and policy and advocacy
- Key people: Allison Alley (CEO)
- Revenue: CA$442 million (2015)
- Employees: 483 (2016)
- Website: www.worldvision.ca

World Vision Canada is a Christian relief, development, and advocacy organization. Based in Mississauga, Ontario, World Vision Canada is the largest private relief and development agency in Canada. It is a part of the World Vision Partnership led by World Vision International.

== History ==
World Vision was started in 1950 by American missionary Robert Pierce.

While visiting China in 1947, Pierce was invited to speak at a girls' school led by Tena Holkeboer, a missionary with the Reformed Church in America. Pierce encouraged the students to go home and inform their families that they were now Christian. He returned to say goodbye the next day and was met by Holkeboer, who was holding a child. The child had been beaten and abandoned by her family for converting to Christianity. Holkeboer asked Pierce what he was going to do about the child. Pierce gave Holkeboer his last five dollars and promised to send more when he returned home. This generated the idea of child sponsorship and World Vision.

Canada has been part of the World Vision family since the early days. In 1950, Pierce held the first meetings in Canada to discuss what he had seen and learned in Asia. In 1957, Canada's first World Vision office opened in Toronto.

== Focus and initiatives ==
World Vision Canada works in nearly 100 countries, with a focus on the well-being of children. They work to change the lives of children around the world through child sponsorship. Sponsorship links donors to children in one of 49 countries. Sponsors make a commitment to contribute $39 monthly to programs that benefit the child, their family and their community.

World Vision Canada's programs focus on education, food, clean water, healthcare, economic and community development, child protection and emergency response.

== Advocacy and campaigns ==
=== 30 Hour Famine ===
The 30 Hour Famine started in 1971 at Crescent Heights Baptist Church in Calgary, Alberta. After the event in Calgary, the 30 Hour Famine spread among youth in the United States, Australia and other parts of the world. By 2015, tens of thousands of young people in 21 countries were involved in the movement. For 30 hours, groups and individuals volunteer to give something up, such as food, video games or cell phones to raise money or awareness for world hunger.

=== No Child for Sale ===
The No Child for Sale campaign aims to bring awareness to child labour. As of 2016, 168 million children are part of the global work force.

Every year, billions of dollars' worth of goods are imported to Canada from countries using child labour. The campaign seeks to encourage Canadians to ask more questions about where their food and clothing comes from and to demand companies make information about their supply chains transparent.

As of 2016, World Vision Canada is seeking legislation requiring companies doing business in Canada to report annually on measures they take to ensure their overseas factories are not using child labour in the manufacturing of products intended for the Canadian marketplace.

=== World Vision Water ===
World Vision Canada's water campaign seeks to provide clean water for drinking, sanitation and hygiene. According to World Vision Canada, more than 663 million people around the world live without access to clean water.

Between 2011 and 2016, World Vision Canada provided over 5.5 million people with safe drinking water.

Since 1995, the Courage Polar Bear Dip in Oakville, Ontario has been raising money for World Vision Canada's water projects around the world. As of 2016, the event has raised over $1.4 million.

On May 27, 2016 staff from World Vision Canada toured downtown Toronto, Ontario with an orange toilet to draw attention to the billions of people around the world who lack access to adequate sanitation and hygiene.

== Funding ==
According to 2015 financial statements, the majority of World Vision Canada's funding comes from child sponsorship and other donations. World Vision Canada also receives grants from the Government of Canada. Their total revenue in 2015 was CA$443 million. In 2015, 80.5% of its funding was spent on programs, 13.8% on fundraising and 5.7% on administration.

In 2016, World Vision Canada employed 455 full-time and 28 part-time employees.

== Celebrity ambassadors ==
The celebrity ambassador program partners with various celebrities to combat poverty and improve the lives of children around the world.

In 2016 Meghan Markle become a Global Ambassador for World Vision Canada. Markle traveled to Rwanda in February 2016 for World Vision Canada's clean water campaign.

== Notable affiliated person ==
- Jann Arden
- Rick Campanelli
- Tom Cochrane
- Mike Fisher
- Lights
- Meghan Markle
- Colin Mochrie
- The Scott Brothers
- Alex Trebek
