= Property Brothers =

Canadian reality television series

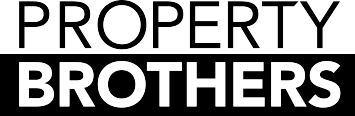
- Genre: Reality
- Developed by: Cineflix; Corus Entertainment
- Starring: Drew Scott; Jonathan Scott
- Country of origin: Canada
- Original language: English
- No. of seasons: 7 (13) (Note: The program's Canadian and US distributors have broadcast the program's episodes on different timelines and schedules. In this article, season and episode numbers are first listed according to air dates by the Canadian distributor (Corus Entertainment), and the corresponding HGTV numbers follow in parentheses.)
- No. of episodes: 173 (list of episodes)

Production
- Production locations: Canada; United States
- Running time: 43 minutes
- Production companies: Cineflix; Corus Entertainment

Original release
- Network: W Network (2011–2017); HGTV Canada (2017–present)
- Release: January 4, 2011 – present

Property Brothers is a Canadian reality television series now produced by Scott Brothers Entertainment, and is the original show in the Property Brothers franchise. The series features twin brothers Drew Scott and Jonathan Scott.

Drew is a real estate expert who scouts neglected houses and negotiates their purchases. His brother, Jonathan, is a licensed contractor who then renovates the houses. Together, the Property Brothers help families find, buy, and transform fixer-uppers into dream homes on a strict timeline and budget. The show has aired in over 150 countries, including on the W Network in Canada and on HGTV in the United States.

== Development ==
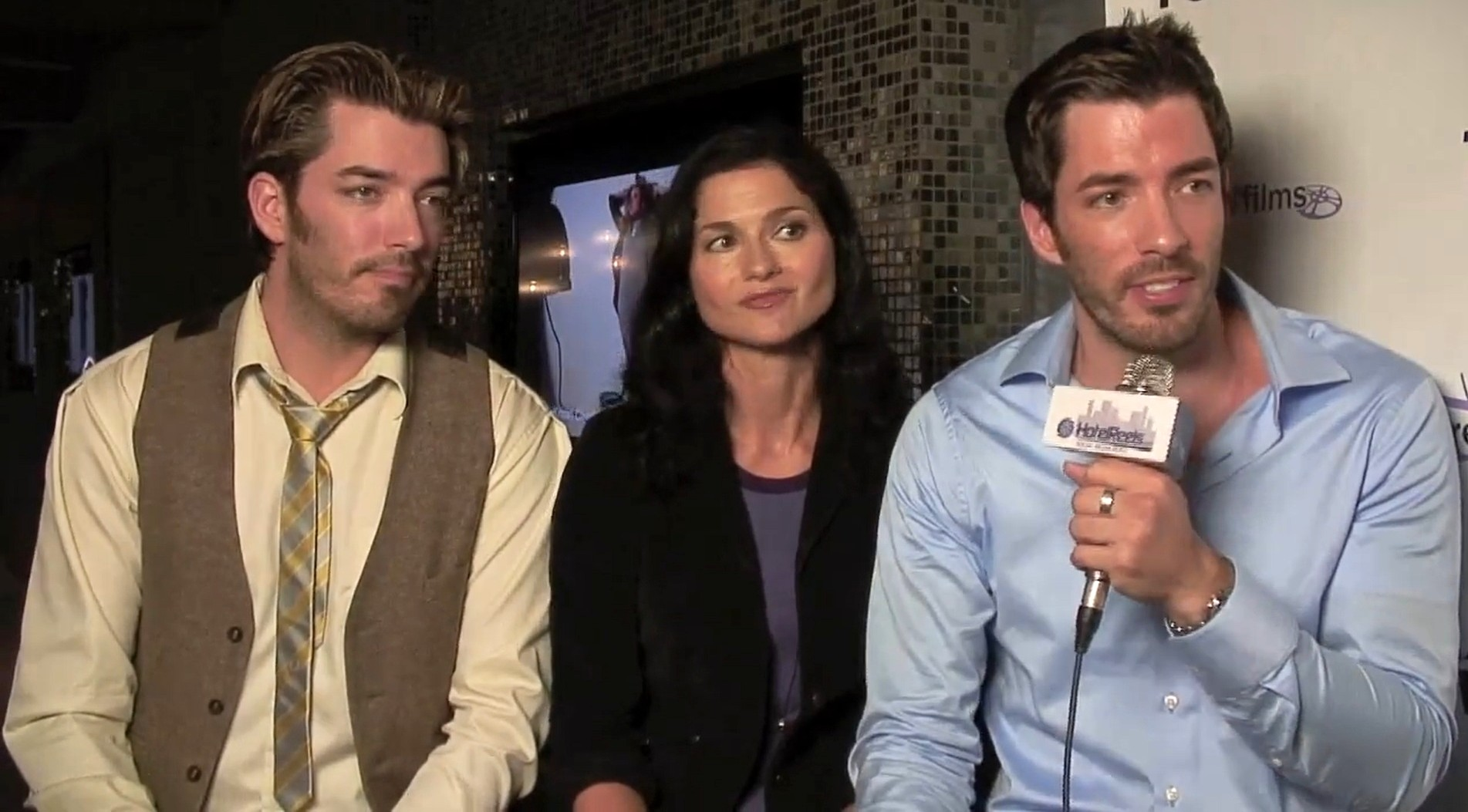
Left to right: Jonathan Scott, actress Jacqueline Hennessy, Drew Scott, in 2010

Drew was offered a job as a host of a real estate competition show that ultimately didn't materialize. Cineflix, however, wanted Drew for a show tentatively called My Dream Home, with the intention of finding a female co-host.

When they learned he had a brother who was also in real estate, the production company asked the brothers to make a sizzle reel. Jonathan and Drew submitted a video of themselves making over their older brother's living room. Six months went by before Cineflix responded favorably, and a week later they began filming a pilot for the show in Toronto.

Originally, the production company wanted Drew to work as the contractor because of his physique; however, when they realized that Jonathan was licensed, they switched the roles.

Cineflix searched for a distributor, and six months went by with no offers. But then, off the strength of the pilot, the W Network in Canada ordered a full season, while HGTV initially passed. When HGTV noted the show's success in Canada, however, they chose to condense the existing episodes to 30 minutes and air them on a trial basis. After the show scored number-one ratings for its timeslot, the network picked the show up for distribution in the US.

== Premise ==
Using the expertise of the Property brothers, prospective homebuyers find a "fixer-upper" and remodel it into their dream home while staying within their budget. The featured families and individuals are often working towards a deadline, like the birth of a child or a special occasion. Originally, each episode started with Drew showing potential homebuyers a house with everything on their wish list, only to later reveal that the house was outside of their reach financially.

However, beginning with season 6 (10), Drew began to explain from the start that the home would exceed their budget, and should only serve as inspiration. In either scenario, Drew and Jonathan then highlight the advantages of purchasing an older home. Afterwards, Drew takes the buyers on a tour of homes that are significantly less ideal, but have renovation potential, and the buyers are asked to narrow their choices down to two. Jonathan then uses computer-generated imagery to illustrate his imagined vision for the homes after significant renovations. The graphics featured on every episode are made by an outside company called NEEZO Studios at a cost of about $10,000 per episode.

After the family makes a final decision, Drew leads them through the process of bidding on and purchasing a home. Once a purchase is made, Jonathan and his team begin renovations. After the initial demolition, the family is kept away from the site, and are brought back at the conclusion for the final reveal.

== Production and distribution ==
Original logo

The show's producers choose cities for filming based on a variety of factors including fan interest, proximity to a major airport, and diversity of architecture.

As is typical of home improvement shows with an accelerated renovation format, three experienced crews work on the house in tandem to finish within the four to seven week timeline. The brothers hire local design, real estate, and construction companies in the cities where they film. Additionally, building permits are typically ready prior to construction, and the brothers' projects take priority with their suppliers.

The buyers own the property and pay for the remodeling, but the show is able to provide about $20,000 to $25,000 worth of cash and furnishings. The brothers do not charge for their services. The total budget presented is for the three or four rooms featured on the show; the rest of the renovations are done off-camera on a separate budget and timeline.

Homebuyers interested in appearing on the show must come up with a shortlist of homes or a home they plan to buy, though Drew provides additional options, and reserves the right to reject their selection if the home is unsafe. Producers screen applicants for their ability to make quick decisions and their availability to film for at least eight weekdays during the project. Individual applicants must appear on the show with a "sidekick," whether it be a partner, friend, or family member. While financial requirements for applicants vary from season to season, the casting call for filming that began in March 2018 required applicants to have a renovation and design budget of at least $90,000 with an additional contingency for unexpected expenses. Real estate agents have helped the brothers find the "inspiration" homes that match the buyers' wish list; the homes are not always for sale.

The brothers have maintained that their shows are not contrived or scripted. Homeowners are not provided with storylines or dialog, and unforeseen construction challenges are real. Additionally, the homebuyers work with real project budgets. However, the brothers concede that conversations may be re-shot and incidents may be reconstructed due to disruptions on set (e.g. a plane flying overhead), to highlight how protracted problems were resolved, or because the cameras did not capture the real-time shot.

The show started out in Toronto. Season 3 (4) of the show was filmed in Austin, Texas for seven episodes, and in Canada for the rest. Part of the reason for the move was the fact that American audiences couldn't relate to the higher market prices in Canada. The brothers returned to their hometown of Vancouver, British Columbia, to film in 2013. In 2014, the show filmed several episodes in Atlanta and Toronto. Between 2015 and 2016 they filmed in Westchester County, New York. In 2017, they filmed in Nashville, Tennessee and in Toronto. In 2018, they filmed in Nashville and Calgary, Alberta.

Property Brothers debuted on the W Network on January 4, 2011, and aired on the channel until its owner, Corus Entertainment, decided to shift the channel's focus to more dramatic content. Starting with 2017/2018 broadcast season, the show began to be broadcast on HGTV Canada in its country of origin. It airs on HGTV in the United States, and with other distributors in over 150 other countries, including Australia, Italy, France, Denmark, Spain, Norway, and South Africa, as well as countries throughout Latin America and Asia. The show is also carried on streaming services such as Hulu, Amazon Video, and Netflix (in some regions). The program is dubbed in Portuguese for some markets, as well as in Spanish, where the voices of both brothers is provided by the same voice actor. Though Corus Entertainment commissioned and developed the program, the company did not take an ownership stake in the series or the concept, so did not see any revenue from international broadcast sales or from spin-off series in the franchise.

The W Network worked with advertisers to generate revenue for the program. Scotiabank has been a sponsor. In 2014, Mazda Canada Inc. announced a sponsorship in the form of embedded marketing (through product placement and story integration) to span all 13 episodes of season 4 (7) filmed in Toronto. The sponsorship also included broadcast and internet ads, billboards, and a contest on the W Network for viewers to win one of three C$5,000 prizes for their homes, a strategy designed to direct traffic to the Mazda website.

In 2019, Scott Brothers Global acquired the brand and related IP rights to Property Brothers from Cineflix Media and producing rights for all future Property Brothers projects. In the deal, Cineflix Rights kept the worldwide distribution rights, excluding the US and English-language in Canada, as well as financial and distribution participation in future productions from the franchise.

== Presenters ==
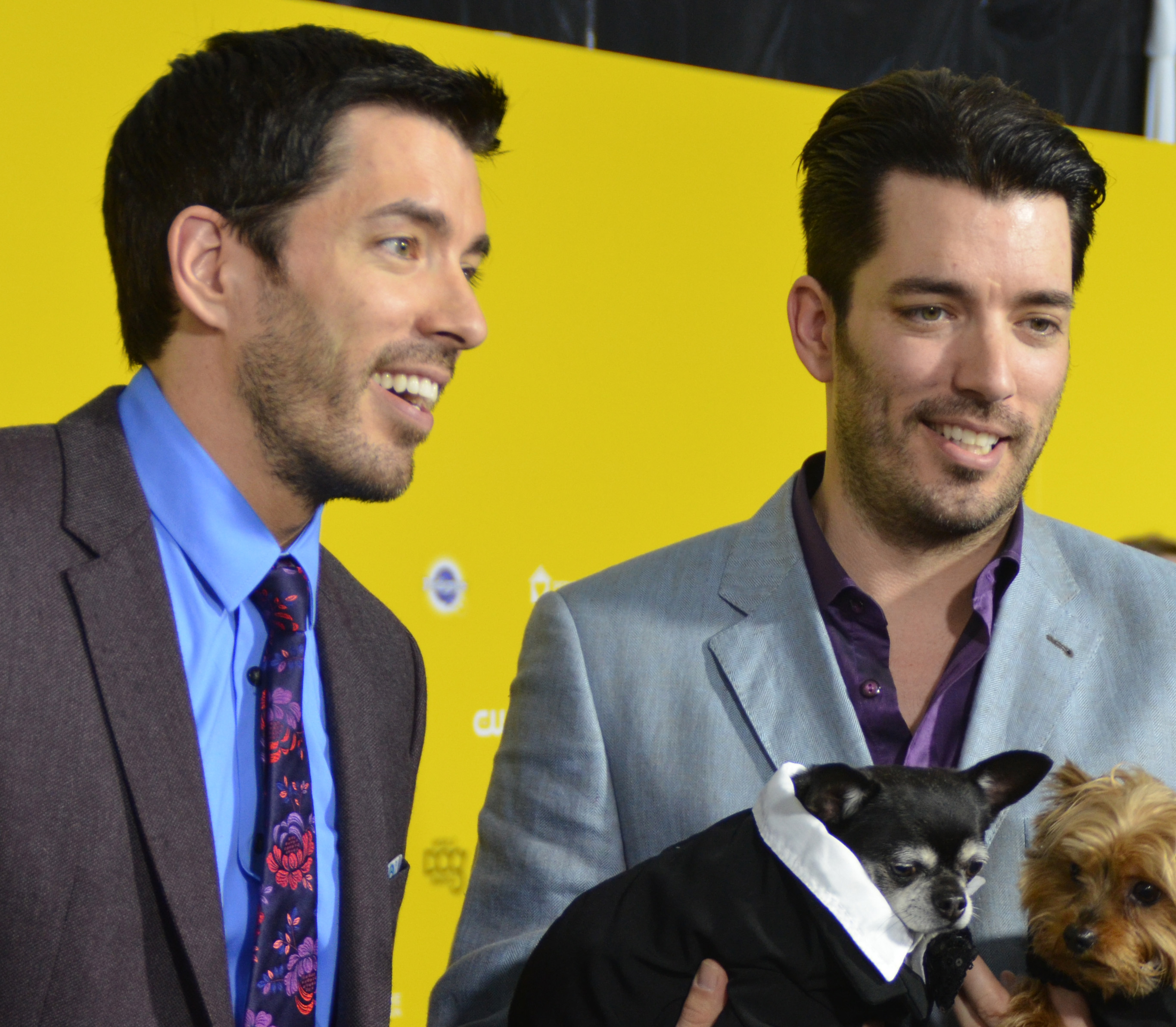
Drew (left) and Jonathan Scott at the 2015 World Dog Awards

Both brothers are licensed real estate agents. (Drew is a licensed agent with Keller Williams Elite in British Columbia.) Jonathan is also a licensed contractor. Before going into real estate as a profession, however, the brothers tried acting, including minor roles in Breaker High, Smallville, and The X-Files.

Drew aspired to be an actor, while Jonathan sought a career as an illusionist, but they began working in the real estate and design fields to financially support themselves as entertainers.

In 1996, they bought their first house as 18-year-old university students and, after renovations, sold it a year later for a $50,000 profit.

In 2004, they founded Scott Real Estate, Inc., a company that oversaw the sale and construction of residential and commercial projects, and that eventually had offices in Vancouver, Calgary and Las Vegas. While their business did well, after ten years went by with little to no acting jobs, Drew decided to return to acting full-time. In 2009, he was finally approached for what would become Property Brothers. At the show's start, the twins had managed real estate holdings for 15 years.

== Reception ==
Within three weeks of its HGTV debut in the United States, the show was the top rated of the night. By 2015, Property Brothers had seen a 77-percent increase in ratings on the W Network over its premiere season. The fifth season attracted more than 10 million US viewers on HGTV in the 25–54 age demographic, and the series consistently ranked as a top five cable program among upscale women in the 25–54 age group.

By 2017, Property Brothers remained one of HGTV's highest rated shows, was HGTV's number three primetime show, and averaged 2 million viewers per week.

Consumer Reports put it on its list of best home improvement shows, saying, "We all wish Drew and Jonathan were our big brothers—and that they’d help us find our dream home." Critics of the show have remarked that the high-budget home purchases and renovations are "out of touch" with the changing housing markets that favor rentals, though Kathleen Finch (an HGTV executive) has said that so-called "hatewatch is part of the appeal" of the show.

Property Brothers has drawn notice from multiple awards. After being nominated in 2011, Drew and Jonathan won the 2012 Leo Award (the awards program for the British Columbia film and television industry) for "Best Host(s) in an Information or Lifestyle Series" for Property Brothers. In 2012, they were nominated for a Rose d'Or award in the lifestyle show category. The show has been nominated for a Cablefax Award and for Outstanding Structured Reality Program at the 2015 Emmy Awards.

At the 2018 Canadian Screen Awards, the program won for Best Lifestyle Program or Series; the program won again in 2019. Property Brothers won the inaugural Critics' Choice Real TV Award in the category Lifestyle Show: Home/Garden.

The program has influenced popular culture, and has been the subject of multiple jokes on Brooklyn Nine-Nine, Unbreakable Kimmy Schmidt, The Late Show with Stephen Colbert, and Saturday Night Live.

The show was also listed as the #2 most popular real estate shows in 2023 on the Agent Wealth Hustle real estate blog in North America.

== Episodes ==
For its duration, Property Brothers has been produced by Cineflix. HGTV (a property of Discovery Inc.) has since joined the program as a distributor, however, and has broadcast the show's episodes on a separate schedule. The dates in the chart below correspond to the episodes' earliest broadcast date. In January 2016, Cineflix renewed the show for 52 more episodes.

On November 9, 2015, the brothers hosted an hour-long special, The Property Brothers: 100 Episodes & Counting, ahead of its 100th episode. The special highlighted their favourite moments from the preceding 99 episodes, and was accompanied by the release of the Property Brothers Handbook, a mobile app that includes design tips, multimedia from the show, and "inspirational photos".

Season	HGTV Season	Episodes	Filming location	Season premiere	Season finale
1	1	13	Toronto, ON	January 4, 2011	March 29, 2011
2	2	13	Toronto, ON	October 20, 2011	January 31, 2012
2	3	13	Austin, TX	February 7, 2012	May 1, 2012
3	4	13	Austin, TX/Toronto, ON	September 4, 2012	February 4, 2013
3	5	13	Vancouver, BC	February 17, 2013	August 22, 2013
4	6	13	Atlanta, GA	January 12, 2014	August 17, 2014
4	7	13	Toronto, ON	October 27, 2014	May 27, 2015
5	8	13	Westchester County, NY	September 14, 2015	October 28, 2015
5	9	13	Westchester County, NY	February 17, 2016	August 22, 2016
6	10	12	Westchester County, NY	October 24, 2016	April 17, 2017
6	11	13	Nashville, TN	April 17, 2017	February 26, 2018
6	12	13	Nashville, TN/Toronto, ON	February 14, 2018	August 29, 2018
7	12	13	Nashville, TN/Toronto, ON	February 14, 2018	August 29, 2018
7	13	13	Las Vegas, NV	September 5, 2018	January 30, 2019

== See also ==
- Love It or List It
- Income Property
- Divine Design
- Fixer Upper

== Footnotes ==
=== Works cited ===
- Scott, Jonathan; Scott, Drew (April 4, 2016). Dream Home: The Property Brothers' Ultimate Guide to Finding & Fixing Your Perfect House. New York: Houghton Mifflin Harcourt. ISBN 978-0544715677.
- Scott, Jonathan; Scott, Drew (September 5, 2017). It Takes Two: Our Story. New York: Houghton Mifflin Harcourt. ISBN 978-1328771476.
