= Drew Scott =

Canadian reality TV personality (born 1978)

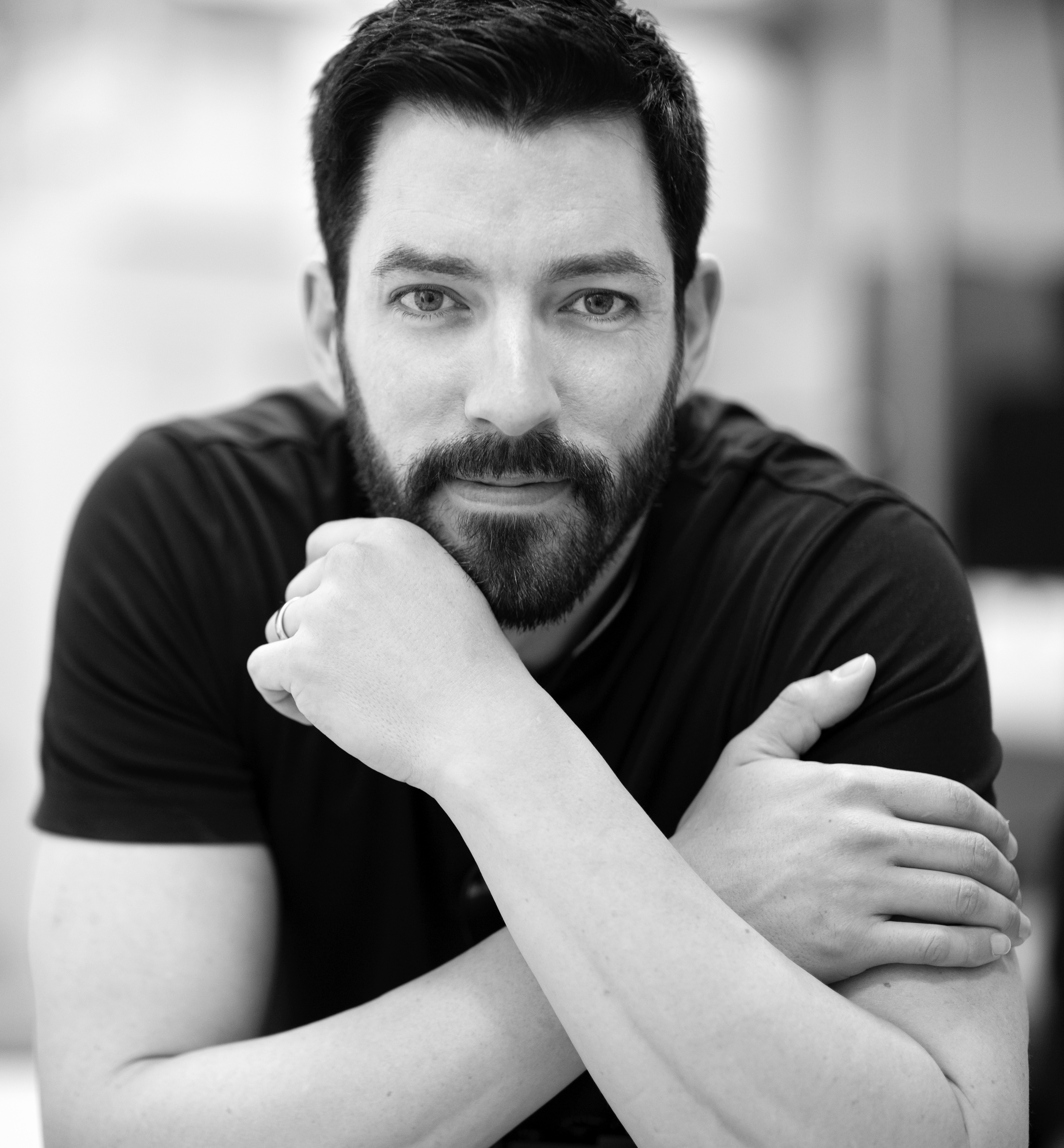
- Scott in 2019
- Born: Andrew Alfred Scott; April 28, 1978 (age 48); Vancouver, British Columbia, Canada
- Education: University of Calgary
- Known for: Property Brothers franchise
- Spouse: Linda Phan (m. 2018)
- Children: 2
- Relatives: Jonathan Scott (identical twin brother)
- Website: www.drewandjonathan.com

Signature
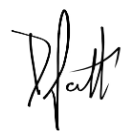

Andrew Alfred Scott (born April 28, 1978) is a Canadian reality television personality, best known as the co-host (along with his identical twin brother Jonathan) of the TV series Property Brothers.

The home-renovation program, which is produced by Cineflix Media, features Drew as the realtor and Jonathan as the contractor.

The success of the show has led to several spinoffs, including Buying and Selling, Brother vs. Brother, Property Brothers: at Home, and Property Brothers: Forever Homes. Scott (along with his two brothers) is also a co-founder of Scott Brothers Entertainment, which creates and produces TV shows, films, and digital content. Additionally, the twins have launched the home furnishings brand Scott Living and its subsidiary, Dream Homes.

Scott participates in charity and philanthropic activities. He resides in Los Angeles with his wife, Linda Phan. The couple had an HGTV show called Property Brothers at Home: Drew's Honeymoon House, that chronicled the renovation of their home, as well as a show on TLC called Drew and Linda Say I Do, which featured the festivities around their May 2018 wedding in Italy.

== Early life ==
Drew Scott was born on April 28, 1978, in Vancouver, British Columbia, the youngest of brothers James Daniel (by two years) and his identical twin brother Jonathan (by four minutes). His birth was a surprise to his parents—Jim and Joanne Scott—who had thought she was giving birth to a single child.

Their father Jim had emigrated from Scotland as a teenager with dreams of being the kind of cowboy he had seen on television. He worked in the film industry as an actor, stuntman, and assistant director until the late 1970s. It was around that time when he decided to focus on raising his family, and they moved to a horse farm in the nearby town of Maple Ridge.

He worked as a youth counsellor while Joanne continued her career as a paralegal in downtown Vancouver. On the twins' seventh birthday, their father encouraged them to get jobs, so they started their first business (called JAM), making nylon covered hangers. According to them, they sold them from door to door until a woman who sold American paraphernalia in Japan ordered thousands.

James would commonly purposely destroy their properties, and would pay the boys from as young as eight years old to build and repair fences, decks, and barns. Even as children, the twins would often rearrange the furniture in their family home. As teens, they attended Thomas Haney Secondary School, and Drew excelled in sports, both coaching and playing on the basketball and volleyball teams. After graduation, the family moved into their new home in Alberta, just as the twins were leaving for Calgary to go to university.

== Career ==
=== Early career ===
At a young age, Scott began acting in theater, improv, and sketch comedy. As children, the twins trained as apprentice clowns, eventually performing at parties and events and charging as much as 100 dollars per hour. However, as Jonathan's interest in magic increased, Drew began to focus more on playing basketball. As a teen and young adult, he also pursued acting, which included roles on Smallville, Breaker High, and Madison. The brothers enrolled in the University of Calgary, and long time athlete Scott studied kinesiology. Despite their plans to become entertainers, the twins didn't want to be "starving artists," and—after watching an informercial by Carleton Sheets—they felt real estate investment would "ease the financial purgatory of being out-of-work actors." After researching the topic,—and during their first semester in college—they assumed the lease of a seven-bedroom rental property across the street from their university. They cleaned and repaired it, then sublet the remaining five rooms, clearing a profit of $800 a month. Taking advantage of a vendor take-back mortgage, they assumed the mortgage of the home with a $250 down payment, made conservative renovations using the rental money, and sold the house a year later for a $50,000 profit. They continued to purchase and "flip" homes at wide profit margins for the next 15 years. Jonathan went to school for construction and design, eventually becoming licensed as a contractor. While his brothers made broader repairs, Drew's labor was mostly limited to installing siding and tile. At the same time, they supported themselves with various jobs including flight attendant, personal trainer, bikini store manager, busboy, website designer, and mall cop. Always planning careers in entertainment, however, the twins—along with their older brother—co-founded Dividian Production Group in 2002, an independent film production company, and Drew continued acting, directing, and producing on the side.

Drew had long abandoned his aspirations to play professional basketball after a string of injuries, but in 2003, an Alberta college recruited him. Already 25 years old, however, and feeling like he was moving backwards, he left after a few weeks and rejoined Jonathan in the real estate business. Having had several negative experiences with realtors, Drew decided to enroll in a real estate program and got his license in 2004, shifting his focus to the real estate transactions. That same year, the twins founded Scott Real Estate Inc., a company designed to provide clients, in their words, a "one stop shop" for services in buying, selling, and renovating properties, as well as design consulting and staging open houses.

=== Transition to television ===
Despite the success he was having as a realtor, Drew became increasingly dismayed that real estate was overtaking his true passion—acting—so in January 2006 he headed to Vancouver. Moving in with his best friend Pedro, he gave himself one year to pursue his dream in earnest. Meanwhile, Jonathan remained in Calgary to run the business. In Vancouver, Scott began taking acting and voice classes, networking with influential persons in the industry, and rising in the ranks on movie production crews, while keeping a color-coded spreadsheet to manage it all. As the year drew to a close, however, he found himself over $100,000 in debt and not as far along as he had hoped. In an interview with Entrepreneur magazine, Scott relates that, on one sleepless night, he listened to a Jim Cuddy song called "Pull Me Through" and realized that he needed to 'go back to his roots.' He sent Jonathan an email asking for Scott Real Estate's marketing template. Soon, he took out a realtor's license in Vancouver and opened a Scott Real Estate branch there. Jonathan moved to Las Vegas in 2008 with his wife, and began purchasing and renovating homes to use as rentals. Having expanded to have offices in Vancouver, Calgary, and Las Vegas, Scott Real Estate had dozens of employees.

Drew began pitching shows with real estate themes, but was mostly being offered (oftentimes with Jonathan) hosting gigs. Eventually, Cineflix offered him a hosting job for a show called Realtor Idol, based on the American Idol format. The show never materialized, but the company's producers wanted Scott for a show tentatively called My Dream Home, with the intention of finding a female co-host. When they learned he had a brother who was also in real estate, they developed a show around the pair, and that company would later film the pilot for Property Brothers. The show was later picked up by HGTV.

Scott joined his brothers in Las Vegas in 2010 and purchased a condo on "The Strip," a highly concentrated urban area just south of Las Vegas. However, he and Jonathan purchased a joint home in 2011. Its renovation became the subject of the twins' fourth TV series, Property Brothers: At Home, and aired on HGTV in the United States, as well as on the W Network in Canada. It became the most highly rated HGTV series premiere since 2009. After the success of Property Brothers at Home, Scott Brothers Entertainment went on to create another spin-off series called Property Brothers: At Home on the Ranch, where the brothers went back to their old stomping grounds of Alberta, Canada to accomplish a 10-week renovation for a family friend's Rocky Mountain estate. As part of the show, Drew and Jonathan wrote and recorded two country singles that premiered during the third and fourth episode of the series. The singles "Hold On" and "Let the Night Shine In" were released on various music platforms, including iTunes, Amazon.com and Google Play. Both songs were co-written by the brothers along with Nashville songwriters Victoria Shaw and Chad Carlson. "Hold On" hit number 38 on Billboard's Hot Country Songs chart and was accompanied by a music video that has more than three million Vevo views. The Scott Brothers released a third song, "My House," featuring Eric Paslay, on January 12, 2017. Filmed at the brothers' Las Vegas home, the song's music video depicts a raucous house party, and includes cameos by Carrot Top, RaeLynn and Lindsay Ell. All proceeds from "My House" single sales have been donated to St. Jude Children's Research Hospital.

Drew and his fiancée, Linda Phan, filmed a five-episode chronicle of the 12-week remodel of their home in Los Angeles called Property Brothers at Home: Drew's Honeymoon House. Jonathan and JD participated in the project. The program premiered on November 22, 2017, on HGTV, and on November 27 on HGTV Canada. In conjunction with the show, the couple made Wedding Crafts with Linda, a web series in which they demonstrate do-it-yourself wedding-themed crafts, including party menus, cocktails, rehearsal dinner invitations, table centerpieces, and wedding favors. The 11-part series began on November 15, and will be featured on HGTV's Facebook and Instagram pages. He and Linda also appeared on the cover of People magazine the week of the show's premiere, capping off what HGTV called Drew's "best week ever."

Great American Country's end-of-the-year Top 50 Country Countdown reached out to the brothers to host the annual program on December 22, 2013. Along with Nancy O'Dell, he and Jonathan co-hosted the 2014 Rose Parade, and co-hosted again in 2015 with Josh Temple. The twins appear as chef's table guests in the sixteenth season of Hell's Kitchen where Drew sat with Melissa Rivers in the blue kitchen while Jonathan sat with Ashley Greene in the red kitchen. They also decorated a house for the models on America's Next Top Model. On March 29, 2016, Drew and Jonathan were guest presenters at the Grand Ole Opry.

=== Other projects ===
In 2010, Drew and Jonathan created Scott Brothers Entertainment, an independent production company. In 2013, they shifted the focus from film to creating original content for television and digital platforms. Their web series Toddler vs. Toddler was produced in 2013 and aired on HGTV and W Network.com. The short Makeover Manor was produced for Funny or Die and also starred several reality stars famous in improvement:—Love it or List It" stars David Visentin and Hilary Farr, Scott McGillivray, Ty Pennington, Bryan Baeumler, Candice Olson, and Sandra Rinomato—plus Jersey Shore stars, Sammi Giancola and Ronnie Ortiz-Magro. Scott Brothers Entertainment also produced seasons three and four of Brother Vs. Brother, the series Half Price Paradise for HGTV and HGTV Canada, as well as Property Brothers: At Home. Drew has written a docu-series based on current social topics that he is passionate about, including solar power. The show has a planned release of 2018.

In 2013, Drew, Jonathan and J.D. hosted the radio show Off Topic with the Scott Brothers for Canada's Corus Entertainment. To publicize the 2013 release of Bob Dylan's 35 album box set, an innovative video of the song "Like a Rolling Stone" was released on Dylan's website. The brothers were invited to be among the characters who are lip-synching the lyrics.

He has continued to pursue his passion of acting; both he and his twin played themselves in the USA Network comedy Playing House in 2015. He and Jonathan appeared in the first five episodes of the webseries Tiny House Arrest, which debuted on January 1, 2016, and was produced by their production company. Scott has also directed several episodes of Property Brothers and Buying and Selling, as well as the Scott Brothers Entertainment-produced web series, Toddler Vs. Toddler.

In 2015, they hosted a Scott Brothers-themed cruise, Sailing with the Scotts, and have another planned for December 2018. Also in 2015, Drew and Jonathan also launched their first outdoor furniture line, Scott Living, on QVC. and by the end of 2016, the line had crossed US$100 million in revenue. Dream Homes (an extension of the brand), provides high-end, customized architecture and home elements for homeowners with budgets in the millions of dollars. Every aspect can be customized, and design ideas are provided by a team of designers based out of Las Vegas. In 2017, the twins brought all their brands under the umbrella of Scott Brothers Global.

They also released their first book, titled Dream Home: The Property Brothers' Ultimate Guide to Finding & Fixing Your Perfect House, on April 4, 2016. It appeared on bestseller lists for The New York Times, The Wall Street Journal, and Amazon.com. Their second book, a memoir entitled It Takes Two: Our Story, was released in September 2017. He and Jonathan have written an illustrated children's book called Builder Brothers: Big Plans, due to be released by HarperCollins on October 2, 2018. The book includes a building project that children can complete with an adult.

In September 2017 Scott was announced as a contestant on season 25 of Dancing with the Stars; his partner was season 24 pro champion Emma Slater. Jonathan surprised the audience by joining Drew's jive performance, mid-routine, on the October 9, 2017 episode. He was eliminated on November 20, 2017, during the first night of the finals, coming in fourth for the season.

Set to air in fall 2019, Scott will host Rock the Block, a competition home renovation show between HGTV television personalities Leanne Ford (from Restored by the Fords), Jasmine Roth (Hidden Potential), Mina Starsiak (from Good Bones) and Alison Victoria (from Windy City Rehab).

They are set to appear in a second season episode of the comedy series Girls5eva.

In 2026, Drew and Jonathan were guests on Episode 5 of the fifth and final season of Hacks in which they appeared as themselves participating in a celebrity edition of The Amazing Race.

== Public image ==
They are known for their goofy senses of humour, and for how much they poke fun at each other, often during public appearances. Unlike Jonathan, who dresses casually for his work as a contractor, real estate agent Drew is known for wearing suits. They both stand over 6'4" tall.

The brothers have enjoyed a largely female fan base, having begun on the W Network, a channel for women's programming. They have also become sex symbols for HGTV. The network has said, "We know that twin brothers and HGTV fan favorites Drew and Jonathan Scott are good-looking, talented and ever-so-popular with the ladies." Kathleen Finch, the president of HGTV, has called the twins "the cable equivalent of box-office movie stars." After the debut of Brother VS Brother, Glamour magazine wrote: "Yes, we've all always harboured massive crushes on the twins, but let's just say they are taking their sex appeal to all new levels—ripped-shirts, greased-muscles, water-sprayed levels of hotness." They garnered the second-largest crowd ever at Mall of America, second only to the British boy band One Direction. ET Canada included them on its Hottest Bachelor list in 2011. The twins made People's list of Men of the Year in 2014, the magazine's 50 Most Beautiful People issue in both 2013 and 2014, and the magazine's Sexiest Man Alive issue in 2013, 2014, and 2017. They were 13 on Hello! Canada's Most Beautiful List of 2014. BuzzFeed included them on their 2015 list of HGTV's "15 All-Time Hottest Hotties."

Scott has sizable followings on various social media platforms, including Twitter, Facebook, Instagram, Snapchat, and Periscope, where he universally uses the handle "MrDrewScott". Mashable even called him a "master" at social media. With his brothers, he would also create videos on the now-defunct platform Vine. The two worked with famous "Viners," including Vincent Marcus, Manon Mathews, Sara Hopkins, BrittleStar, NeatDude, and Gregor Reynolds. People magazine named a post of him and Jonathan doing pull-ups the "Vine of the Day."

== Personal life ==
Drew met his wife, Linda Phan, at a Toronto Fashion Week event in 2010. Beginning in 2014, they lived together in the Las Vegas home that Drew still owns with his twin. He estimated they were only there about twice a year, however, as Phan travels with Scott as Creative Director of Scott Brothers Entertainment, "overseeing their digital content, product and merchandise lines, and marketing campaigns." Scott has said that he and Phan are "workaholics," and that "getting out of the home office is step one for a great date." They became engaged on December 13, 2016, and were wed in a destination wedding in Italy on May 12, 2018. The ceremony incorporated elements of their respective Scottish and Vietnamese heritages, and was the subject of a show called Drew and Linda Say I Do, which aired on June 2, 2018, on TLC. Drew co-wrote (along with Victoria Shaw and Chad Carlson) and performed a song for his bride called "You Chose Me," and an accompanying music video was released to YouTube on June 2, 2018. They also expressed their desire to have children. In October 2017, they moved to Los Angeles, California, and the couple has said they plan to raise their future children there. In December 2021, the couple announced that they were expecting their first child in May 2022 after a two-year fertility journey that included IUI and IVF treatments. Their son was born on May 4, 2022. They announced the birth of their second child, a daughter, on June 5, 2024.

While not an American citizen, Scott tends to have Democratic views. He endorsed Hillary Clinton on his Twitter account in September 2016. He also considers life coach Tony Robbins a personal hero, and has used Robbins' idea of "incantations"—a technique of verbal actualization—to reach his goals.

Scott is a basketball enthusiast. Along with his brothers, Scott grew up playing basketball, but in a GQ interview, explained that he was the more enthusiastic one—sometimes practicing four or five hours a day. He played in both high school and college, and reportedly had a 43-inch vertical jump. He made his university basketball team, but got injured before the first season, and never played in a game. Scott has played in various celebrity sport charity games, including Josh Hutcherson's Nike 3-on-3 Basketball at L.A. Live/Staples Center. He has twice played in the NBA All-Star Celebrity Game, and in the 2012 game, he took home a trophy for the Shooting Stars Celebrity challenge.

Scott values a healthy lifestyle, monitoring his diet and regularly exercising. He has a black belt in karate. He is a fan of the show The Walking Dead and, beginning in 2016, was invited as a recurring commentator on the aftershow Talking Dead to give his insights on the show and "zombie property values."

On September 21, 2023, Drew joined the Vancouver Giants ownership group.

== Philanthropy ==
Scott is active in various philanthropic projects, from working with children's hospitals to coordinating initiatives to help underprivileged youth. He has collaborated with the network of artists involved in Paul Haggis' Artists for Peace and Justice, a non-profit organization that supports communities globally through programs in peace, and social justice, with recent efforts focused on building schools, providing clean water, and medical treatment in Haiti. He also serves as a global ambassador for World Vision and, in April 2013, travelled to New Delhi, India with his brothers on a campaign to bring awareness to concerns regarding child labor and trafficking. Drew and Linda requested that, in lieu of wedding gifts, guests and supporters donate to WE, "an organization that provides people in need with clean water in Asia, Africa, and Latin America." They teamed up with the organization again on their honeymoon, assisting in local volunteer projects, visiting coffee and cacao farms, and exploring the Amazon jungle while staying at the staying at the ME to WE Minga Lodge.

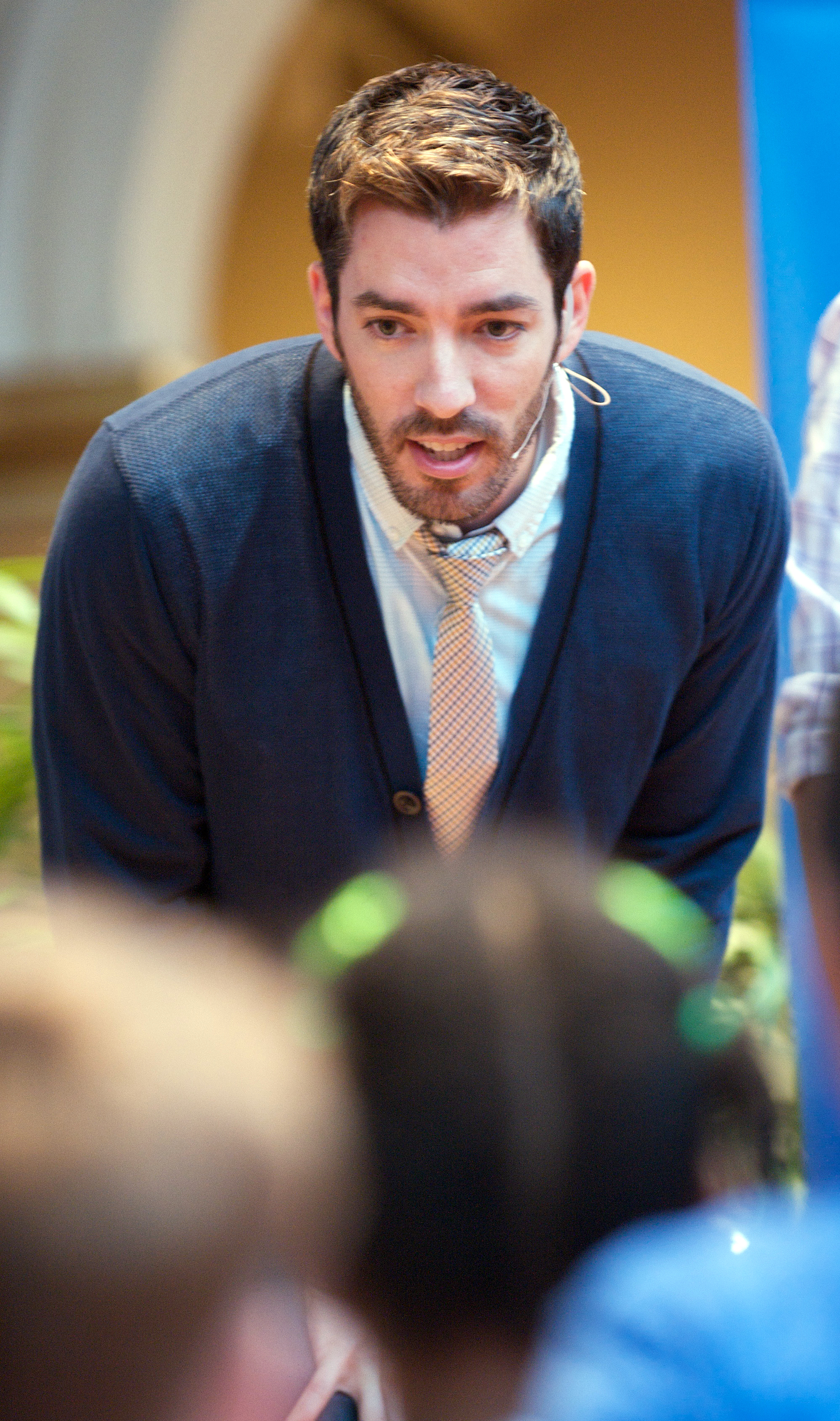
Scott engaging with children at the Let's Read Let's Move event at the National Building Museum on August 6, 2013

With his brother Jonathan, he worked with Michelle Obama's initiative, "Let's Read Let's Move," educating and encouraging students to live healthy and active lifestyles. As part of the "Let's Move!" project, the brothers also hosted an event for kids at the National Building Museum in Washington, D.C., with US Secretary of Education, Arne Duncan. The event saw hundreds of students participate in activities led by the brothers and Duncan, helping the kids get active and excited about reading through storytelling and hands on games that taught them about building environmentally friendly homes. They partnered with Target for a school library makeover, which seeks to "remodels school libraries to ignite a love of reading and help put more children on the path to graduation." They also support pediatric cancer research through St. Baldrick's Foundation.

== Awards ==
With brother Jonathan, Scott won the 2012 Leo Award (the awards program for the British Columbia film and television industry) for "Best Host(s) in an Information or Lifestyle Series" for Property Brothers. In 2012, they were nominated for a Rose d'Or award in the lifestyle show category. Property Brothers was nominated for Outstanding Structured Reality Program at the 2015 Emmy Awards. In November 2017, both brothers were selected by Habitat for Humanity for its highest honor, Habitat Humanitarians. According to the organization, the honor was "in recognition and furtherance of their dedication to Habitat for Humanity's vision of a world where everyone has a decent place to live. In April 2019, he and Jonathan joined Habitat for Humanity's third-annual Key campaign, for affordable housing across US, in constructing a home.

== Filmography ==
- Madison (1997) – Kevin
- Breaker High (1997) – Deck Guy #2
- Smallville — Tom Welling's body double
- The Pulse
- Dancing Ninja (2010) – DDR Boyfriend
- Coyote Mountain (2010) – Paul Henry
- Property Brothers (2011 – 2019)
- The Perfect Proposal (2011) – Cooper
- The Oracle (2011) – Spartan #1
- Buying and Selling (2013 – 2019)
- Pumpkin Wars (2012)
- Brother Vs. Brother (2013 – present)
- Property Brothers: At Home (2014)
- A Christmas Parade (2014) – Jason Keppler
- Playing House (2015) – Himself
- America's Next Top Model, "The Girl Who Walks Away" (2015)
- Property Brothers: At Home on the Ranch (2015)
- All-Star Gingerbread Build (2015)
- All-Star Halloween Spectacular (2016)
- Talking Dead (2016–2019) – Recurring commentator
- Brothers Take New Orleans (2016)
- Hell's Kitchen, "Dancing in the Grotto" (2016) – Chef's table guest for the red team
- My Brother, My Brother and Me, "Dorms & Ghoulsmashing" – Himself (2017)
- Home to Win (2017 – present)
- Dancing with the Stars (2017)
- Property Brothers at Home: Drew's Honeymoon House (2017)
- Drew and Linda Say I Do (2018)
- Property Brothers: Forever Home (2019 - present)
- Rock the Block (2019) — Host
- A Very Brady Renovation (2019)
- Ryan's Mystery Playdate (2019)
- Girls5eva (2022)
- Saturday Night Live (2023)
- Rubble & Crew – Hank Hammer (voice)
- Love Hurts – Jeff Zaks
- Murdoch Mysteries (2026) - Cecil Winchester

== Discography ==
(credited as The Scott Brothers)

- "Let the Night Shine In" (SB Records, November 24, 2015)
- "Hold On" (SB Records, February 10, 2016)
- "Home" (SB Records, May 16, 2016)
- "My House" (SB Records, 2017) – cover of the Flo Rida song of the same name

(solo credit)

- "You Chose Me" (June 4, 2018)

== Publications ==
- Dream Home: The Property Brothers' Ultimate Guide to Finding & Fixing Your Perfect House (2016)
- It Takes Two: Our Story (2017)
- Builder Brothers: Big Plans (2018)

== See also ==
- David Visentin

== Works cited ==
- Scott, Jonathan; Scott, Drew (April 4, 2016). Dream Home: The Property Brothers' Ultimate Guide to Finding & Fixing Your Perfect House. New York: Houghton Mifflin Harcourt. ISBN 978-0544715677.
- Scott, Jonathan; Scott, Drew (September 5, 2017). It Takes Two: Our Story. New York: Houghton Mifflin Harcourt. ISBN 978-1328771476.
