= Scott Brothers Global =

American production company

- Type: Domestic LLC
- Genre: Media and Lifestyle
- Founded: March 17, 2017; 9 years ago in Las Vegas, Nevada, US
- Founders: Jonathan Scott; Drew Scott
- Headquarters: Nashville, Tennessee, United States
- Key people: Drew Scott; Jonathan Scott; David Dembroski
- Brands: Scott Brothers Entertainment; Scott Living; Dream Homes; Casaza
- Website: scottbrothersglobal.com

Scott Brothers Global is the international entertainment production company founded by brothers and partners Jonathan and Drew Scott. The company has its origins in Dividian Production Group, an independent film company that the twins, along with their older brother JD, founded in 2002. Dividian Production Group became Scott Brothers Entertainment in 2010, before coming under the umbrella of Scott Brothers Global in 2017.

== History and operations ==
The logo for Dividian Production Group was used from 2002 until the end of 2009.

Brothers JD, Jonathan, and Drew Scott founded Dividian Production Group in 2002 as an independent film company. In 2010, Dividian Production Group became Scott Brothers Entertainment, and in 2013, they shifted the focus from film to television and digital platforms. As part of the restructuring, the brothers brought on Katie Ruttan Daigle to the position of Vice President of Development and Production in the company's Factual Entertainment division. She had worked with the brothers before, having produced the first episode of Property Brothers.

Scott Brothers Global was officially incorporated in March 2017 as an umbrella company of their various brands. Headquarters were moved from Las Vegas to Nashville in 2019, a more central location to licensees and the company's partners. Its corporate office remains in Las Vegas, while the television production company operates out of Toronto. In 2018, David Dembroski became president of the company. In that position, he possesses fiscal oversight and brand management responsibility for all areas of Scott Brothers Global, including "brand licensing, endorsement, entertainment, book publishing and the television production businesses." Laura Aldrich is Executive Vice President of Licensing. Michael Kim, based in Los Angeles, is the senior vice president of business development. Alina Duviner, in Toronto, serves as Vice President of Communications. Amy Melen, operating from New York, is the Vice President of Production Design.

== Scott Brothers Entertainment ==
Scott Brothers Entertainment
- Industry: Entertainment
- Founders: Jonathan Scott; Drew Scott
- Headquarters: Las Vegas, Nevada, United States
- Key people: Drew Scott; Jonathan Scott; Josie Crimi
- Number of employees: less than 50
- Parent: Scott Brothers Global
- Website: sbentertainment.com

Founded in 2010, the company creates television, film, and digital content for distribution in North American and international markets. The original logo for Scott Brothers Entertainment features the heads of the three brothers, in order: Jonathan, Drew, and JD. Most of the initial content focused on projects starring Jonathan and Drew, and projects affiliated with the Property Brothers franchise. More recently, the brand has expanded to media vehicles outside of the brothers' brand. Jonathan and Drew also formed a pop country music duo named The Scott Brothers releasing a number of singles and music videos.

David Dembroski serves as president Scott Brothers Global, Josie Crimi as Executive Vice President of Development & Production, Drew's wife, Linda Phan, serves as the company's Creative Director.

=== Projects ===
The web series Toddler Vs. Toddler and Property Brothers Big Day Off were produced in 2013 and aired on HGTV and the W Network. The webisode Makeover Manor was produced for Funny or Die and also starred Love it or List It stars David Visentin and Hilary Farr, Scott McGillivray, Ty Pennington, Bryan Baeumler, Candice Olson, Sandra Rinomato, plus Jersey Shore stars, Sammi Giancola and Ronnie Ortiz-Magro. In 2014, Scott Brothers Entertainment produced the new series, Half Price Paradise, for HGTV and HGTV Canada. Scott Brothers Entertainment also produced Property Brothers: at Home, which was the highest rated series premiere on HGTV since 2009. Property Brothers: at Home featured Jonathan and brother Drew Scott as they renovated their Las Vegas family home.

In 2014, SBE expanded its in-house digital team to focus on making more online content for their network partners. Beginning in March 2017, the brothers partnered with Chase Bank for a series of commercials on lending options for homeowners. The 2017 web series Wedding Crafts with Linda starred Drew and his fiancée, Linda Phan, as they demonstrate do-it-yourself wedding-themed crafts, including party menus, cocktails, rehearsal dinner invitations, table centerpieces, and wedding favors. The 11-part series began on November 15, 2017 and was featured on HGTV's social media accounts. The program Drew and Linda Say I Do, chronicles the couple's week-long wedding festivities in the Italian countryside and aired on TLC. They've also produced pilots for two reality shows, The Meat Boss and "Warming Up with Erin Heatherton."

The brothers are currently developing a screenplay written by their father James, called High September, about a cowboy who wrongly served a 30-year sentence, only to come out and be abandoned by his family. Jonathan has written a documentary series about renewable energy. Together, the brothers have written two screenplays, one about a lonely "hook up" artist, and the other about "a band of brothers" from a rural town who have wholesome values. With offices in both the US and Canada, Scott Brothers Entertainment is currently in production on two original series for Scripps Networks Interactive, as well as other projects.

On March 6, 2018, the brothers launched a digital video content platform, GuruHub.tv, with curated content based on fan requests and featuring celebrities, social media influencers, and new talent. In October of that year, Fox announced that it was developing a show called It Takes Two, based on the brothers' memoir of the same name. Jon and Josh Silberman would write for the show, and would executive produce along with the Scotts, Kim and Eric Tannenbaum (of the Tannenbaum Company), Austin Winsberg, and Jason Wang. The series would be produced The Tannenbaum Company in association with Lionsgate Television and Scott Brothers Entertainment.

In 2019, Scott Brothers Global acquired the brand and related IP rights to Property Brothers from Cineflix Media and producing rights for all future Property Brothers projects. In the deal, Cineflix Rights kept the worldwide distribution rights, excluding the US and English-language in Canada, as well as financial and distribution participation in future productions from the franchise. It will also share in ancillary revenue from the Property Brothers brand.

=== Filmography ===
==== Short films ====
- Karma Inc. (2009)
- A Better Me (2009)
- The Oracle (2011)
- The Fence (2011)
- The Perfect Proposal (2011)
- The Interrogation (2012)
- Makeover Manor (2013)
- Bros Take Broadway (2016)

==== Feature-length films ====
- High September (in production)

==== Television ====
- Property Brothers (2011–present) — Acquired by Scott Brothers Entertainment in 2019
- Brother vs. Brother (2013–present)
- Brothers Big Day Off (2014)
- Property Brothers: At Home (2014)
- Half-Price Paradise (2015)
- GAC Insider (2015) – also distributed
- DIY Insider (2015 – present)
- Property Brothers: At Home on the Ranch (2015)
- All-Star Halloween Spectacular (2016)
- Reno Set Go (2017)
- Property Brothers at Home: Drew’s Honeymoon House (2017)
- Drew and Linda Say I Do (2018)
- Nate & Jeremiah by Design (2017–present) — Acquired by Scott Brothers Entertainment in 2019
- Menu Match-Up (2017)
- A Very Brady Renovation (2019)
- Make Your Move (2020)
- Trixie Motel (2022)

==== Web series ====
- Toddler Vs. Toddler (2014)
- HGTV Insider (2014)
- The Scott Seat (2015)
- Tiny House Arrest (2016)
- In the Scott Seat (2016)
- Elevate Your Space Challenge (2016)
- Wedding Crafts with Linda (2017)

=== Radio ===
- Off Topic with the Scott Brothers (2013)

=== The Scott Brothers ===
The Scott Brothers
- Origin: Canada / United States
- Genres: Pop, Country music
- Years active: 2015 – present
- Label: SB Records
- Members: Jonathan Scott; Drew Scott

The twins also formed a musical pop, rock and country duo project called The Scott Brothers that released a number of singles starting 2015 coupled with music videos of the singles.

As part of their show Property Brothers: At Home on the Ranch, the brothers—along with Nashville songwriters Victoria Shaw and Chad Carlson—wrote and recorded two country singles that premiered during the third and fourth episode of the series. The singles “Hold On” and “Let the Night Shine In” were released on various music platforms, including iTunes, Amazon.com and Google Play. Both songs were co-written by the brothers along with Nashville songwriters Victoria Shaw and Chad Carlson. "Hold On" hit #38 on Billboard's Hot Country Songs chart and was accompanied by a music video that has more than 5 million Vevo views. They also released a cover of the Flo Rida song "My House" with Eric Paslay, and released it on January 12, 2017.

==== Discography ====
The Scott Brothers

- "Let the Night Shine In" (SB Records, November 24, 2015)
- "Hold On" (SB Records, February 10, 2016)
- "Home" (SB Records, May 16, 2016)
- "My House" (SB Records, January 12, 2017) – credited to The Scott Brothers featuring Eric Paslay - a remake of the Flo Rida song of the same name

Drew Scott

- "You Chose Me" (June 2, 2018) - (solo credited to Drew Scott)
- "Desperate Reno" (July 5, 2018) - (credited to Drew Scott featuring Dirty Plaid) - a comic adaptation of "Despacito"

== Scott Living ==
Scott Living
- Type: Lifestyle
- Founder: Jonathan Scott; Drew Scott
- Headquarters: Nashville, Tennessee, United States
- Revenue: 250 million
- Parent: Scott Brothers Global
- Website: scottlivinghome.com

In 2015, the twins created an outdoor furniture line called Scott Living that was launched on QVC. By the end of 2016, the brand had crossed 100 million in revenue. In early 2017, they partnered with Coaster Fine Furniture to expand to include indoor offerings, which are available at retailers including Lowe's, Costco, Orchard, and Bed Bath & Beyond. That spring, beginning on April 14, they released their new line of fabrics to Fabric.com and Hobby Lobby. The brand aims to reach $250 million in revenue in 2018. In January 2018, Scott Living introducing a new, high-end bedding line with Restonic, and the following March, the brand launched a custom frame program with craft store Michael's. In September 2018, Kohl’s Corp. announced that it would be collaborating with the Property Brothers to offer an exclusive line of furniture, bedding, bath goods and home décor for release in the fall of 2019.

Dream Homes (an extension of the brand), designs high-end, customized architecture and home elements for homeowners with budgets in the millions of dollars. Every aspect can be customized, and design ideas are provided by a team of designers based out of Las Vegas. Clients ask for features like "a helipad, a 20-car garage, or a million-dollar theater room." They are currently only accepting clients from Las Vegas Valley, where they are based.

In 2020, Scott Living launched their line of wallpapers with the A-Street brand of Brewster Home Fashions.

== Casaza ==
In October 2018, the brothers launched Casaza. The website features showrooms styled by designers the brothers have personally approved. Each item in the room available for purchase. Long-term, the venture plans to make both the featured designers and local designers throughout the country available for hire through the website. Featured designers include Jessica Davis from Nashville and Keia McSwain of the Denver-based firm Kimberly + Cameron.

== Philanthropy ==
SBE founded The Producers Ball, a fundraising event held during the Toronto International Film Festival that highlights North American media producers. Each year, the proceeds benefit a charity, such as World Vision. In cooperation with Operation Homefront, a non-profit organization that helps military families, the brothers presented a family with $10,000 in credit from Scott Living they use towards furnishing a home they received from Chase Bank.

== Footnotes ==
=== Works cited ===
- Scott, Jonathan; Scott, Drew (April 4, 2016). Dream Home: The Property Brothers' Ultimate Guide to Finding & Fixing Your Perfect House. New York: Houghton Mifflin Harcourt. ISBN 978-0-544-71567-7.
- Scott, Jonathan; Scott, Drew (September 5, 2017). It Takes Two: Our Story. New York: Houghton Mifflin Harcourt. ISBN 978-1-328-77147-6.
