= My House (Flo Rida song) =

2015 single by Flo Rida

- Remix EP cover

Single by Flo Rida

from the EP My House
- Released: September 24, 2015
- Recorded: 2014
- Genre: Pop-rap; dance-pop
- Length: 3:12
- Label: International Music Group; Poe Boy; Atlantic
- Songwriters: Ross Golan; Johan Carlsson; Marco Borrero; Roy Hammond; Tramar Dillard
- Producers: Johan Carlsson; MAG

Flo Rida singles chronology
"I Don't Like It, I Love It" (2015)	"My House" (2015)	"Hello Friday" (2016)

Music video
- "My House" on YouTube

"My House" is a song by American rapper Flo Rida from his 2015 EP of the same name. The song was released as the album's third official single on September 24, 2015, in the US. The song samples the drum break from "Impeach the President" by The Honey Drippers.

== Commercial performance ==
"My House" debuted at number 96 on the Billboard Hot 100 in the issue dated November 28, 2015, before falling to 99 on the following week. The song then slowly gained momentum until a sharp increase in attention following Flo Rida's January 14, 2016 performance on The Tonight Show Starring Jimmy Fallon, a halftime performance at an NFL playoff game on January 16, and its appearance as WrestleMania 32's theme song on April 3, jumping places from 23 to 12 and becoming the track to gain the most digital sales in a week on the chart.

On the issue dating March 19, 2016, the single reached its peak of number four, becoming Flo Rida's eleventh and most recent top 10 and top 40 single in his native United States. The song has been certified quadruple Platinum in the US. The song sold 2,217,000 copies in the United States in 2016, making it the second best-selling song of the year, as well as the best-selling song of the first half of 2016. It was ranked at number 35 on Billboard's Decade-End Digital Songs chart. As of December 2016, it has sold a total of 2,732,000 downloads in the country.

== Music video ==
The music video was directed by Alex Acosta and features Flo Rida at a party full of women.

== Charts ==
=== Weekly charts ===
Chart (2015–2016)	Peak position
Australia (ARIA)	6
Austria (Ö3 Austria Top 40)	8
Belgium (Ultratop 50 Flanders)	37
Belgium (Ultratop 50 Wallonia)	21
Canada Hot 100 (Billboard)	5
Czech Republic Airplay (ČNS IFPI)	6
Czech Republic Singles Digital (ČNS IFPI)	20
France (SNEP)	31
Germany (GfK)	16
Hungary (Single Top 40)	37
Hungary (Stream Top 40)	17
Ireland (IRMA)	37
Italy (FIMI)	45
Latvia (EHR)	3
Netherlands (Single Top 100)	33
New Zealand (Recorded Music NZ)	12
Norway (VG-lista)	24
Scottish Singles Sales (Official Charts)	41
Spain (Promusicae)	59
Sweden (Sverigetopplistan)	4
Switzerland (Schweizer Hitparade)	15
UK Singles (Official Charts)	59
UK Hip Hop/R&B (Official Charts)	10
US Billboard Hot 100	4
US Adult Pop Airplay (Billboard)	14
US Dance Airplay (Billboard)	18
US Pop Airplay (Billboard)	1
US Rhythmic Airplay (Billboard)	3

=== Year-end charts ===
Chart (2016)	Position
Australia (ARIA)	28
Austria (Ö3 Austria Top 40)	58
Canada (Canadian Hot 100)	17
France (SNEP)	138
Germany (Official German Charts)	67
Italy (FIMI)	99
Sweden (Sverigetopplistan)	25
Switzerland (Schweizer Hitparade)	57
US Billboard Hot 100	14
US Adult Top 40 (Billboard)	39
US Mainstream Top 40 (Billboard)	11
US Rhythmic (Billboard)	15

== Certifications ==
Region	Certification	Certified units/sales
Australia (ARIA)	2× Platinum	140,000^{‡}
Belgium (BRMA)	Gold	10,000^{‡}
Canada (Music Canada)	3× Platinum	240,000^{*}
Denmark (IFPI Danmark)	Platinum	90,000^{‡}
Germany (BVMI)	Platinum	400,000^{‡}
Italy (FIMI)	Platinum	50,000^{‡}
New Zealand (RMNZ)	5× Platinum	150,000^{‡}
Poland (ZPAV)	2× Platinum	40,000^{‡}
Portugal (AFP)	Gold	10,000^{‡}
Spain (Promusicae)	Gold	20,000^{‡}
Sweden (GLF)	Platinum	40,000^{‡}
Switzerland (IFPI Switzerland)	Gold	15,000^{‡}
United Kingdom (BPI)	Platinum	600,000^{‡}
United States (RIAA)	6× Platinum	6,000,000^{‡}
^{*} Sales figures based on certification alone.^{‡} Sales+streaming figures based on certification alone.

== Release history ==
List of release dates, showing region, formats, label and reference
Region	Date	Format(s)	Label	Ref.
United States	October 13, 2015	Contemporary hit radio	Atlantic	

== The Scott Brothers version ==
"My House"

Single by The Scott Brothers featuring Eric Paslay
- Released: January 12, 2017
- Genre: Country
- Length: 3:13
- Label: SB
- Songwriters: Ross Golan; Johan Carlsson; Marco Borrero; Roy Hammond; Tramar Dillard

Music video
- "My House" on YouTube

The Scott Brothers released a cover of the song with Eric Paslay on January 12, 2017. The music video was filmed at their home in Las Vegas, Nevada. The proceeds from the sale of the single go to St. Jude Children's Research Hospital.

While singing along to the original in while driving, Jonathan Scott thought it would make a good country song. Paslay was originally brought on to do a rap cameo, but they liked his voice so much they invited him to sing on the entire song.
