= Property Brothers (franchise) =

Canadian television franchise

Property Brothers franchise
- The promotional poster to the program Property Brothers
- Owners: Cineflix; Scott Brothers Entertainment

Films and television
- Short films: Makeover Manor; Bros Take Broadway
- Television series: Property Brothers; Buying and Selling; Brother Vs. Brother; Property Brothers: At Home; Brothers Take New Orleans

Audio
- Radio program: Off Topic with the Scott Brothers

Miscellaneous
- Apps: Property Brothers Handbook
- Books: Dream Home: The Property Brothers' Ultimate Guide to Finding & Fixing Your Perfect House

The Property Brothers franchise is a Canadian media franchise that stars Canadian twins Jonathan and Drew Scott and centers around the selling, purchasing, and renovation of real estate property. The shows also often guest star their older brother J.D. Their first program is Property Brothers—initially produced by Cineflix Media—and has aired on the W Network and HGTV Canada in its country of origin, on HGTV in the US, and on other networks in over 150 countries. The success of this show led to spin-off series (including Buying and Selling, Brother Vs. Brother, and Property Brothers: At Home), several web series, a how-to book, a radio show, and an app. Strategy magazine named the Property Brothers its 2013 Brand of the Year.

== Television ==
The brothers create over 60 hours of broadcast content each year, and can have as many as 17 projects going on at a time. Kathleen Finch, the president of the DIY Network and HGTV, has planned to have a new episode of original content each week of the year. Because of their filming schedule, they no longer take personal clients. They are reportedly the highest paid talent on HGTV.

To maximize efficiency and expertise, they hire local design, real estate, and construction companies in the cities where they film. There are as many as seven construction crews working on various properties at the same time. The brothers have also brought on members of their extended network of friends and family, including JD (their older brother), Linda Phan (Drew's wife), Analee Belle (JD's wife), and Pedram (their best friend). Due to the nature of their roles, Jonathan spends more time physically onsite, while Drew manages the business aspects of their various enterprises; however, they arrange "planning sessions" to ensure that Jonathan's input is included in the decision making.

The brothers have maintained that their shows are not contrived or scripted. Homeowners are not provided with storylines or dialog and unforeseen construction challenges are real. Additionally, they invest their own money in the competition series. However, they concede that conversations may be re-shot and incidents may be reconstructed due to disruptions on set (e.g. a plane flying overhead), to highlight how protracted problems were resolved, or because the cameras did not capture the real-time shot. Homeowners must apply to the show with a shortlist of homes or a home they plan to buy, though Drew provides additional options, and reserves the right to reject their selection if the home is unsafe. While most of the program's renovations start with demolition, off-camera the program reuses or donates salvageable fixtures, cabinetry, and other materials. In November 2017, both brothers were selected by Habitat for Humanity for its highest honor, Habitat Humanitarians. According to the organization, the honor was "in recognition and furtherance of their dedication to Habitat for Humanity’s vision of a world where everyone has a decent place to live.

=== Property Brothers ===
Property Brothers is a Canadian reality television series that is produced by Cineflix. Its history begins when Drew was living in Vancouver and auditioning for acting roles. He was offered the chance to host a show called Realtor Idol, based on the American Idol format. The show never materialized, but producers wanted him for a show tentatively called My Dream Home (a title which has been used in some international markets), with the intention of having a male and female host. When they learned he had a brother who was also in real estate, they developed a show around the pair; that company would later film their pilot for Property Brothers. The show first aired on the W Network in Canada, and was later picked up by HGTV.

The series features Drew, a real estate expert who scouts neglected houses and negotiates the purchases. Jonathan is a licensed contractor who renovates houses. Together, they help families find, buy, and transform "fixer-uppers" into dream homes on a strict timeline and budget.

Within three weeks of its HGTV debut, the show was the top rated of the night. The fifth season attracted more than 10 million US viewers on HGTV in the 25–54 age demographic, and the series consistently ranked as a top five cable program among upscale women in the 25–54 age group. As of 2017, Property Brothers remains one of HGTV's highest rated shows, is HGTV's number three primetime show, and averages 2 million viewers per week. The series received an Emmy nomination in 2015 for Best Structured Reality Program. Seasons 6 and 7 have the brothers operating in the Greater Toronto Area, Nashville, Calgary, and Las Vegas.

=== Buying and Selling ===
On Buying and Selling, Jonathan renovates the family's current home for a successful sale, while Drew checks out the best options for the family's new property. Drew then oversees the selling of the renovated home and the buying of a new house.

The first season premiered on the W Network in January 2013. It debuted on HGTV on August 29, 2012 and had a rating of 8 million viewers in the 25 – 54 age group; it ranked as a top 10 HGTV primetime program among the same viewers. The second season began on December 4, 2013. The fifth season started on July 13, 2016. The sixth season premiered on April 19, 2017. In 2017, the show remained one of HGTV’s top 10 primetime shows. The program was nominated for Lifestyle – Home at the Realscreen Awards in 2014.

=== Brother vs. Brother ===
In November 2012, HGTV greenlit production on the Scotts' third program, Brother vs. Brother. In the show's original premise, each brother was assigned a property of similar value and structure, as well as a team of home improvement experts, including renovators, builders, and designers. Given an identical timeline and a budget of $500,000, each brother mentored his respective team as they made improvements on the home, and each week, the poorest performing member was eliminated from the competition. The last remaining team member won a $50,000 cash prize. At the conclusion of the renovations, an appraiser and a real estate expert would judge the overall renovation and re-assess the values of each property. The brother who had the house with the highest resale value won. The show was edited to seven episodes.

The show debuted on July 21, 2013, and was the highest-rated program on W Network with women 25 to 54 every night of the first season. David Font—a landscape architect and business owner from Miami, Florida—won the $50,000 cash prize. Team Drew took the season, with $15,000 more in final property value for his home.

Beginning with season three, the show eliminated the team format, and the brothers began to compete directly. With their older brother J.D. as the referee, the twins each purchase and renovate a house of their choice using their own money with the goal of increasing the property value of each home. Also, the twins face weekly challenges before a panel of HGTV and DIY Network guest judges, including David Bromstad, Tiffany Brooks, Anthony Carrino, Hilary Farr, Jen and Brandon Hatmaker, Egypt Sherrod, Vanilla Ice, and David Visentin. The losing brother of each challenge would have to complete a dare, like dancing in an all-male revue. Proceeds from the sale of the homes are now donated to Rebuilding Together, a charity that benefits low-income homeowners.

The first season under the new format (season three) premiered on June 3, 2015, and had an audience of over 13 million viewers. Jonathan won. The fourth season premiered on June 1, 2016, this time with homes based in Las Vegas. The season brought in 14 million viewers. The next season of Brother vs. Brother was filmed in Galveston, Texas, and premiered on May 31. Penalties for losing challenges included "be[ing] forced to endure miserable outings such as riding a terrifying amusement park attraction, climbing an 81-foot obstacle ropes course or heading out to sea to catch shrimp for the winner's dinner." They sought to collaborate with fellow HGTV stars Chip and Joanna Gaines of Fixer Upper, which is filmed in nearby Waco, Texas, but the couple was busy. Drew won the season, selling his home for $690,000—a $90,000 profit. Commercially, the season had more than 12 million total viewers, and was the number-two cable show among upscale women aged 25–54 in its timeslot. The following season was filmed in the suburbs of San Francisco and premiered on May 28, 2018. HGTV announced the renewal of the series for a seventh season on December 17, 2019. On July 29, 2020, it was announced that the seventh season would premiere on September 18, 2020.

By 2017, Brother vs. Brother remained HGTV's highest rated show.

=== Property Brothers: At Home ===
The twins decided to sell their individual homes and purchase a joint property in 2011, with the goal of establishing a hub for their extended family and friends. Jonathan began the search for a place that met all of their criteria (e.g. within 20 minutes of the airport), and they ultimately purchased a foreclosed, 5400 square-foot house west of Mandalay Bay for $400,000. With a renovation budget of $2 million, the project became the basis of a fourth television series, with working titles that included The Brothers Big Reno Project and Property Brothers: Behind Our Build. Eventually renamed Property Brothers: At Home, it was the first production under the umbrella of Scott Brothers Entertainment. The show premiered on November 26, 2014 on HGTV in the United States, and became the most highly rated HGTV series premiere since 2009. It also aired in 2015 on the W Network in Canada.

=== Property Brothers: At Home on the Ranch ===
After the success of Property Brothers at Home, Scott Brothers Entertainment went on to create another spin-off series called Property Brothers: At Home on the Ranch. In it, the brothers went back to the area where they grew up in the East Canadian Rockies in Longview, Alberta to accomplish a 10-week renovation of the ranch of family friends Tom and Rosemary Bews. The renovation included the kitchen, dining room, living room, fireplace, and bathroom of the main home, as well as the guest cabin and the eight-stall horse stable.

The four-episode series premiered on November 25, 2015 on HGTV. As part of the show, the brothers—along with Nashville songwriters Victoria Shaw and Chad Carlson—wrote and recorded two country singles that premiered during the third and fourth episode of the series. The singles "Hold On" and "Let the Night Shine In" were released on various music platforms, including iTunes, Amazon.com and Google Play. "Hold On" hit #38 on Billboard's Hot Country Songs chart and was accompanied by a music video that has more than 5 million Vevo views.

=== Brothers Take New Orleans ===
In Brothers Take New Orleans, Jonathan and Drew, with J.D.'s assistance, competed in the renovation of a traditional "shotgun house" duplex in New Orleans that was built in 1904. The house's owner was displaced after damage caused by Hurricane Katrina; a fraudulent contractor then took her renovation money without completing the work. The home had been uninhabited for 11 years when the brothers worked with the New Orleans disaster relief organization SBP to completely restore the home. The brothers were allotted four weeks and $125,000 each to increase the value of their homes at no cost to the homeowner. They collaborated with local designers and contractors to maintain the historical integrity of the home according to local code.

Produced by Scott Brothers Entertainment, the show premiered on HGTV on November 23, 2016. Each week featured a specific design challenge: the kitchen, bedroom, living room. Guest judges Scott Bakula, Hoda Kotb, and Ben and Erin Napier were brought in to decide the winner.

=== Property Brothers at Home: Drew's Honeymoon House ===
Drew and his fiancée, Linda Phan, completed filming a five-episode chronicle of the 12-week remodel of their home in Los Angeles. The show, called Property Brothers at Home: Drew's Honeymoon House, aimed to have all the renovations done in time for the couple's wedding rehearsal dinner. The series is produced by Scott Brothers Entertainment, and Jonathan, Drew, Jane Van Deuren, and Jim MacPherson serve as executive producers. The home was built in the 1920s, and is "an original 1920s-era, 3,400-square-foot home" in Hancock Park, Los Angeles. Both a renovation and restoration, the couple sought to preserve elements of the English-inspired architecture while adding modern updates, Hollywood glam, and an Art Deco design style. They also added a basement to the house. Drew and Linda plan to raise their future children in the house. Jonathan and JD participated in the project. The program premiered on November 22, 2017 on HGTV, and on November 27 on HGTV Canada.

While promoting the show, HGTV employed a multi-platform initiative designed to capitalize on the 513 million monthly visitors they receive across their digital platforms, as well as its 104 million television viewers per month. Maximizing the wedding theme from the home renovation program, the network would produce more than a dozen short-form videos around the show, as well as exclusive digital and social content, a national print story in HGTV Magazine, and a special episode of Food Network's Cake Hunters (which aired in February 2018). Drew and Linda also appeared on the cover of People magazine the week of the show's premiere.

=== Property Brothers: Linda & Drew Say I Do ===
Drew and Linda wed on May 12, 2018, and the nuptials and related festivities were featured in Property Brothers: Linda & Drew Say I Do, a television special that aired on TLC on June 2, 2018.

=== Property Brothers: Forever Home ===
The brothers regularly got feedback from fans on social media asking for a program for persons who wanted to remodel the homes they were already in. In the fall of 2018, casting began in Las Vegas for a new show on which the brothers would help families transform their homes into their dream, "forever" homes. Filming began in January 2019. In the show's premise, Drew has the homeowners tour nearby renovated homes to figure out which features they can and cannot live without. Jonathan then presents two design options and, once the couple decides, the renovations begin. Property Brothers: Forever Home debuted on May 29, 2019 in the US and on June 3, 2019 in Canada. The first episode delivered the highest-rated series premiere for HGTV since March 2017, garnering a .84 live plus three-day rating among P25-54. The June 10, 2019 episode featured the renovation of the home of JD Scott, the twins' older brother, and his fiancé, Annalee Belle.

The second season premiered on December 18, 2019.

The third season premiered on April 15, 2020.

The fourth season premiered on October 28, 2020.

=== A Very Brady Renovation ===
A Very Brady Renovation showcases the renovation of the North Hollywood, California home used for many of the exterior shots in the 1969–1974 American sitcom The Brady Bunch. HGTV purchased the home in 2018 for $3.5 million, and the brothers' renovation of the home was completed in May 2019. The resulting show premiered on September 9, 2019.

=== Celebrity IOU ===
In April 2020, the program Celebrity IOU debuted, a show in which celebrities surprise their personal heroes with home makeovers. Celebrities invited to the first season of the show included Brad Pitt, Viola Davis, Rebel Wilson, and Melissa McCarthy.

In September 2020, Australian network Nine, of which airs the program, announced they would be making an Australian adaptation of the series to air in 2021.

In March 2021, Brazilian networks SBT and Discovery Home & Health, of which airs the program, announced they would be making a Brazilian adaptation entitled Te Devo Essa! Brasil, which premiered on June 5, 2021.

=== Builder Brothers Dream Factory ===
Builder Brothers Dream Factory, an animated series for preschoolers centred on child versions of the Scott brothers learning cooperation and construction skills as they try to solve problems, premiered in 2023 on Treehouse TV.

=== Don't Hate Your House with the Property Brothers ===
Don't Hate Your House with the Property Brothers, in which the Scotts help families renovate their existing homes, premiered on HGTV in Canada and the United States in 2024.

=== Backed by the Bros ===
Backed by the Bros premiered on HGTV on June 5, 2024

=== Property Brothers: Under Pressure ===
Property Brothers: Under Pressure premiered on HGTV on March 15, 2026; commissioned by Rogers Sports & Media for its new Canadian HGTV channel (initially announced under the working title Property Brothers: Commitment Issues), the series follows the Scott brothers as they help clients navigate the housing market to purchase a new home, while also exploring and performing budget-oriented renovations to help finish it off.

=== Future programs ===
In early 2018, HGTV signed a multiyear extension to their contract with Drew and Jonathan Scott for original content. In April 2019, Jonathan and Drew purchased the house next door to Drew's Los Angeles home. Despite online speculation that Jonathan would be moving there, he denied the rumors, saying, "We may have a project coming up. You’ll have to stay tuned for that." On June 10, 2019, the brothers announced on Instagram that they would be coming to Latin America to film, and confirmed that they would be in South America (particularly Brazil) in the following weeks.

Long term, the brothers would like to host a talk show, and say they have been approached by "several broadcast networks," but the timing is not right at the moment. They also hope to host an episode of Saturday Night Live.

== Web series ==
BroCam (2012)
Produced by Cineflix, the series was a collection of one- to two-minute webisodes that launched on the W Network's YouTube channel, website, and Facebook page on October 23, 2012. Scotiabank came on as a sponsor with the September 10, 2013 episode. The premise of the series presented the brothers ostensibly using a handheld camera to film themselves talking about various personal topics, like their first kisses, phobias, or vacation memories. The final five episodes deviated from this formula, and were narrated recaps of Property Brothers episodes. There were 76 webisodes in all, and the last one was posted on October 22, 2015.
Toddler Vs. Toddler (2014)
The scripted, six-episode elimination challenge spoofs the show Brother Vs Brother, but features two teams of three toddlers each. Airing on HGTV.com, the show was produced by Scott Brothers Entertainment. Red Arrow Industries completed post-production on the series.
The Scott Seat (2015)
Each episode placed the brothers on a red couch as they answered questions and played games with fans. The episodes ranged from two to three minutes and were filmed in Tarrytown, New York and Stamford, Connecticut between 2015 and 2016. Produced by Scott Brothers Entertainment, ten episodes in all have been posted to HGTV's website.
Elevate Your Space Challenge (2016)
Sponsored by GMC to promote the Sierra Denali, the four-episode web series debuted on YouTube on October 11, 2016. Under the twins' coaching, two couples—Adam and Kayla of Castaic, California and Colin and Bree of Valencia, California—competed to build the better outdoor living space, that included a grill and dining area. Each team was given $10,000 and a week to complete the challenge, in which they would be judged on "vision, craftsmanship, and versatility." In the final episode, the brothers announced Colin and Bree as the winners. At-home viewers were invited to vote on their favorite space at the show's official website, and Adam and Kayla won the poll.

== Short films ==
- Makeover Manor (2014)
- Bros Take Broadway (2016)

== Print media ==
=== Books ===
In 2015, Houghton Mifflin Harcourt announced that they had signed a deal with Drew and Jonathan for the book Dream Home: The Property Brothers' Ultimate Guide to Finding & Fixing Your Perfect House. It was released April 4, 2016 and debuted at number nine on the New York Times bestsellers list for advice/how-to, as well as at number three on the Wall Street Journal bestsellers list for nonfiction. On Amazon.com, the book was a number one best seller in the site's Home Design & Construction category. The book received largely positive reviews. The Library Journal called the book the "happy exception" to other DIY books, and said that "loaded with checklists and tips, this manual is fantastic." Publishers Weekly said it was a "comprehensive and detailed guide."

The brothers released Builder Brothers: Big Plans, with illustrations by Kim Smith, a children's book that will be the first in the Builder Brothers series. The book, published by HarperCollins, relates a fictionalized version of a time that the brothers built a dog house for a neighbor. In conjunction with the book's release and through partnerships with Kohl's, Heart of America, and HarperCollins, Scott Brothers Global announced that they would makeover one elementary school library. The second book in the series, Builder Brothers: Big Plans, is due for release on September 10, 2019.

=== Reveal magazine ===
Drew and Jonathan have launched Reveal magazine also known as Drew + Jonathan Reveal Magazine, a quarterly lifestyle publication wit first issue on newsstands on 10 January 2020. Published by Meredith Corporation, with an initial print of 750,000, the magazine using the motto "It all starts at home" will feature the twin brothers' "dream big" philosophy on life, infusing ideas and storytelling that inspire personal growth and happiness into every issue with home at its core. In addition to focusing on Drew and Jonathan's exclusive take on home décor and design, Reveal spotlights entertaining, family, food, gardening, outdoor living, wellness, music, travel and more.

== Apps ==
Ahead of the airing of the 100th episode of Property Brothers, the brothers released the Property Brothers Handbook, an iTunes mobile app that provides design tips and exclusive content from the show. It was launched on September 8, 2015 and remained free to download until September 22. The app was produced by Cineflix in association with Corus Entertainment, and Secret Location, with the participation of the Bell Fund. It was re-launched in 2017.

Released on June 20, 2019, Property Brothers: Home Design was released to various mobile app stores, including for the Apple and Android platforms.

Scott Brothers Global released Property Brothers: Home Design, a mobile game, on June 20, 2019. It employs a "match and collapse" puzzle style of gameplay; winning these puzzles affords the user coins which are used to renovate houses and rooms. Storm8, the mobile game publisher, announced that the game would have weekly content updates and regular, limited-time, monthly events with special rooms and design challenges.

== Podcast ==
The brothers, along with their brother JD, co-hosted a 13-week, 60-minute lifestyle radio series called Off Topic with the Scott Brothers, which aired on Corus Radio. The show premiered on September 14, 2013 and aired throughout Canada.

== Brand ==
The brothers have said that they turn down licensing deals that don't align with their brand. In 2013, Strategy magazine named the Property Brothers as its Brand of the Year. The brothers appeared in an ad for ADT during Super Bowl LIII.

== See also ==
- Love It or List It (franchise)
- Flip or Flop (franchise)

== Footnotes ==
=== Works cited ===
- Scott, Drew; Scott, Jonathan (April 2016). Dream Home: The Property Brothers' Ultimate Guide to Finding & Fixing Your Perfect House. New York: Houghton Mifflin Harcourt. ISBN 978-0-544715-67-7.
- Scott, Jonathan; Scott, Drew (September 5, 2017). It Takes Two: Our Story. Houghton Mifflin Harcourt. ISBN 978-1328771476.
