= HGTV Design Star All Stars =

- No. of episodes: 4

Release
- Original network: HGTV
- Original release: July 31 – August 21, 2012

Season chronology
- ← Previous; Season 7 Next → Season 8

HGTV Design Star All Stars is a spin-off series based on HGTV Design Star. It features 6 designers from the first seven seasons of the original series. Host and mentor David Bromstad and incumbent judges Vern Yip and Genevieve Gorder will all return to their respective positions for this competition. The season premiered on HGTV on July 31, 2012, a week following the conclusion of the seventh season of the parent series.

Leslie Ezelle was the winner.

== Designers ==
Designer	Age^{1}	Original Season	Rank (Then)	Place of Residence	Rank (Now)
Kellie Clements	33	Season 6 - 2011	4th	Edmond, Oklahoma	6th
Leslie Ezelle	44	Season 6 - 2011	6th	Dallas, Texas	1st
Josh "Sparkle Josh" Johnson	37	Season 2 - 2007	5th	Hendersonville, Tennessee	5th
Tom Vecchione	47	Season 5 - 2010	6th	New York, New York	3rd
Dan Vickery	29	Season 4 - 2009	2nd	Portland, Oregon	4th
Hilari Younger	31	Season 7 - 2012	3rd	Dallas, Texas	2nd

- ^{1} Age at the time of the show's filming

== Contestant progress ==
Place	Contestant	Episodes			
Place	Contestant	1	2	3	4
1	Leslie	IN	LOW	WIN	WINNER
2	Hilari	IN	LOW	IN	RUNNER-UP
3	Tom	IN	WIN	HIGH	THIRD
4	Dan	WIN	HIGH	OUT	
5	Josh	LOW	OUT		
6	Kellie	OUT			

(WINNER) The designer won the competition.
(RUNNER-UP) The designer received second place.
(WIN) The designer was selected as the winner of the episode's elimination challenge.
(HIGH) The designer was selected as one of the top entries in the elimination challenge, but did not win.
(IN) The designer advanced to the next challenge, but was not selected as a top nor a bottom entry in the elimination challenge.
(LOW) The designer was selected as one of the bottom entries in the elimination challenge, but was not the final contestant to move on to the next round
(LOW) The designer was selected as one of the bottom entries in the elimination challenge and was the final contestant to move on to the next round.
(OUT) The designer was eliminated from the competition.
