= HGTV Design Star season 7 =

HGTV Design Star
- Season 7
- No. of episodes: 9

Release
- Original network: HGTV
- Original release: May 29 – July 24, 2012

Additional information
- Filming dates: January 2012 – February 2012

Season chronology
- ← Previous; Season 6 Next → All Stars

The seventh season of the American reality television competition series HGTV Design Star premiered on May 29, 2012. The host and mentor this season is David Bromstad. Danielle Colding is the winner of Season 7 of Design Star. Her show Shop This Room premieres on August 4.

== Designers ==
Designer	Age^{1}	Hometown	Occupation	Place
Yuki Northington	43	Bay Saint Louis, Mississippi	Artist/Boutique Owner	12th
Jordan Cappella	40	Venice, California	Interior/Furniture Designer	11th
Luca Paganico	36	Pittsburgh, Pennsylvania	Industrial Designer	10th
Bex Hale	37	Abilene, Texas	Design Store Owner	9th
Miera Melba	64	Delray Beach, Florida	Interior Designer	8th
Kris Swift	34	Austin, Texas	Interior Designer	7th
Stanley Palmieri	34	Pittsburgh, Pennsylvania	Sculptor/Contractor	6th
Rachel Kate	36	Minneapolis, Minnesota	Interior/Fashion Designer	5th
Mikel Welch	32	New York City, New York	Set Designer Trading Spaces	4th
Hilari Younger	31	Dallas, Texas	Interior Stylist	3rd
Britany Simon (Fan Favorite)	28	Phoenix, Arizona	Designer/Photographer	2nd
Danielle Colding	36	Queens, New York	Design Firm Owner	1st

- ^{1} Age at the time of the show's filming

== Elimination table ==
Place	Contestant	Episodes								
Place	Contestant	1	2	3	4	5	6	7	8	9
1	Danielle	HIGH	HIGH	LOW	LOW	WIN	WIN	IN	IN	WINNER
2	Britany	IN	IN	HIGH	IN	HIGH	WIN	WIN	IN	RUNNER-UP
3	Hilari	HIGH	LOW	LOW	WIN	HIGH	LOW	IN	OUT	
4	Mikel	IN	IN	HIGH	HIGH	IN	LOW	OUT		
5	Rachel	WIN	WIN	HIGH	LOW	LOW	OUT			
6	Stanley	LOW	HIGH	WIN	IN	IN	OUT			
7	Kris	LOW	IN	IN	IN	OUT				
8	Miera	IN	IN	IN	OUT					
9	Bex	LOW	IN	OUT						
10	Luca	HIGH	LOW	OUT						
11	Jordan	IN	OUT							
12	Yuki	OUT								

(WINNER) The designer won the competition.
(RUNNER-UP) The designer received second place.
(WIN) The designer was selected as the winner of the episode's elimination challenge.
(HIGH) The designer was selected as one of the top entries in the elimination challenge, but did not win.
(IN) The designer advanced to the next challenge, but was not selected as a top nor a bottom entry in the elimination challenge.
(LOW) The designer was selected as one of the bottom entries in the elimination challenge, but was not the final contestant to move on to the next round
(LOW) The designer was selected as one of the bottom entries in the elimination challenge and was the final contestant to move on to the next round.
(OUT) The designer was eliminated from the competition.

== Challenges ==
=== Challenge 1: Home Sweet Hollywood ===
Designers get into six teams of two and three days to design a great room, three bedrooms, a den, and a design studio and lounge.

- First Aired: May 29, 2012
- Guest Judge: Daisy Fuentes

Results of Challenge 1
Result	Designer	Project Location
Winner	Rachel	Den
Top 4	Hilari	Den
Top 4	Danielle	Great Room
Top 4	Luca	Great Room
Safe	Britany	Bedroom
Safe	Mikel	Bedroom
Safe	Jordan	Bedroom
Safe	Miera	Bedroom
Bottom 4	Bex	Bedroom
Bottom 4	Kris	Bedroom
Bottom 2	Stanley	Design Studio/ Lounge
Eliminated	Yuki	Design Studio/ Lounge

=== Challenge 2: White Room Challenge ===
- First Aired: June 5, 2012
- Guest Judge: Vanilla Ice

Results of Challenge 2
Result	Designer	Theme of White Box
Winner	Rachel	Her roots as a fashion designer
Top 3	Danielle	Tribute to her mother Bold, 1970s graphic
Top 3	Stanley	Painting with Light
Safe	Bex	
Safe	Britany	modern & graphic lines
Safe	Kris	Room on Fire: Destruction with the Light of Hope
Safe	Miera	
Safe	Mikel	
Bottom 3	Hilari	Jewelry Box
Bottom 3	Luca	
Eliminated	Jordan	Zen Garden

=== Challenge 3: Klassically Kardashian Design ===
- First Aired: June 12, 2012
- Guest Judge/Client: Kris Kardashian Jenner

Results of Challenge 3
Result	Designer	Project Location
Winner	Stanley	Kris Jenner's Office
Top 4	Rachel	Kris Jenner's Office
Top 4	Brittany	Conference Room
Top 4	Mikel	Conference Room
Safe	Miera	Reception
Safe	Kris	Reception
Bottom 4	Hilari	Kitchen/Makeup Room/ Public Relations
Bottom 3	Danielle	Kitchen/Makeup Room/ Public Relations
Eliminated	Bex	Showroom
Eliminated	Luca	Showroom

=== Challenge 4: Designers Transform Indoor/Outdoor Spaces ===
- First Aired: June 19, 2012
- Guest Judge: Sabrina Soto

Results of Challenge 4
Result	Designer	Project Location
Winner	Hilari	Living Room (A)
Top 2	Mikel	Living Room (A)
Safe	Britany	Outdoor Area (A)
Safe	Stanley	Outdoor Area (A)
Safe	Kris	Outdoor Area (B)
Bottom 3	Rachel	Outdoor Area (B)
Bottom 3	Danielle	Living Room (B)
Eliminated	Miera	Living Room (B)

=== Challenge 5: Designers Celebrate Hollywood's 125th Birthday ===
The remaining seven designers must create small lounge areas for a party thrown by the Hollywood Chamber of Commerce. Each lounge must be inspired by a different time/design period seen in the history of Hollywood. For their Camera Challenge, the contestants must speak publicly to the event's guests about their space.

- First Aired: June 26, 2012
- Guest Judge: Marg Helgenberger

Results of Challenge 5
Result	Designer	Lounge's Design/Time Period
Winner	Danielle	Art Deco (1920s/1930s)
Top 3	Britany	Hollywood Regency (popular in 1930s)
Top 3	Hilari	1980s
Safe	Mikel	Mid-Century Modern (1950s/1960s)
Safe	Stanley	Futuristic
Bottom 2	Rachel	Victorian (late 1800s/early 1900s)
Eliminated	Kris	1970s

=== Challenge 6: Dream Kitchens ===
- First Aired: July 3, 2012
- Guest Judges: The Kitchen Cousins

Results of Challenge 6
Result	Designer	Kitchen Theme
Winners	Britany	Eclectic and "Lived-In" (Stainless Steel Sink)
Winners	Danielle	Eclectic and "Lived-In" (Stainless Steel Sink)
Bottom 4	Mikel	Traditional Country (Printed Country Sink)
Bottom 3	Hilari	Bold and Modern (Black Apron Front Sink)
Eliminated	Rachel	see Mikel
Eliminated	Stanley	see Hilari

=== Challenge 7: Final Four Designers Make Over Condos ===
Designers randomly select different color hues and work on different condominiums and appear on National Daytime Show, The Talk.

- First Aired: July 10, 2012
- Guest Judge: Meg Caswell

Results of Challenge 7
Result	Designer	Color Hue
Winner	Britany	Yellow
Safe	Danielle	Blue
Safe	Hilari	Red
Eliminated	Mikel	Green

=== Challenge 8: Yurt Last Chance ===
In order to move on to the final challenge, the final three designers must create a fantasy bedroom suite in a yurt, a unique and challenging structure to design in. They each get to work with a celebrity carpenter who is a current member of a television show. The designers must also film two camera challenges: one to display interaction with their respective carpenter and explain a project he is working on, and a second, more general one about the space.

- First Aired: July 17, 2012
- Guest Judge: Mark Steines

Results of Challenge 8
Result	Designer	Theme of Yurt	Celebrity Carpenter
Advanced to the Finale	Britany	Modern Beach Bungalow	Joel West (HGTV's Design on a Dime)
Advanced to the Finale	Danielle	Global Contemporary	Chip Wade (HGTV's Elbow Room)
Eliminated	Hilari	Bali Retreat	Jeff Devlin (DIY's I Hate My Bath)

=== Challenge 9: And The Winner Is.... ===
For the last challenge, the final two designers have to make pilots for their own show. Before they begin, the last four designers to be eliminated returned and split into two teams. One going with Brittany and the other going with Danielle alongside their carpenters. Mikel and Rachel joined Brittany and Hilari and Stanley joined Danielle. Each team had a real family to transform a dining and living room for.

- First Aired: July 24, 2012
- Guest Judge: David Bromstad

Results of Challenge 9
Result	Contestant	Name of Show
Winner	Danielle	Shop This Room
Runner-Up	Brittany	Picture Perfect Spaces

== Fan Favorite Voting Results ==
From May 1, 2012, until July 27, 2012, fans of the show could go to HGTV Design Star's website and vote ten times each day for their favorite designers to win an online show. On July 27, runner-up Britany Simon was announced as the winner of the fan favorite contest. Her online show will premiere soon.

Results of Fan Favorite Voting
Designer	Final Percentage of Votes Received
Britany Simon	23
Yuki Northington	18
Danielle Colding	16
Bex Hale	14
Mikel Welch	8
Hilari Younger	7
Miera Melba	6
Rachel Kate	5
Stanley Palmieri	4
Luca Paganico	3
Jordan Cappella	2
Kris Swift	1
