= HGTV Design Star season 4 =

Season of American reality television show

The fourth season of HGTV Design Star premiered on July 19, 2009. The series was filmed in Los Angeles, California for the first time. Vern Yip returned as a judge, and was joined by newcomers Genevieve Gorder and Candice Olson. Clive Pearse returned as host, and this was his final season hosting the show. A major change this season was that the judges decided the winner, instead of having a public vote.

The winner was Antonio Ballatore, whose show The Antonio Treatment debuted in March 2010.

== Designers ==
Designer	Age^{1}	Current City	Occupation	Place
NataLee Callahan	30	Salt Lake City, Utah	Interior Designer/Realtor	11th
Amy Sklar	39	Los Angeles, California	Interior Design Business Owner	10th
Jen Guerin	33	San Diego, California	Color Designer	9th
Tashica Morgan	29	Bowie, Maryland	Design Coordinator	8th
Jany Lee	35	Dallas, Texas	Self-Taught Interior Designer	7th
Nathan Galui	25	Palm Beach, Florida	Furniture/Interior Designer	6th
Jason Champion	33	Sarasota, Florida	Product Designer/Radio Host	5th
Torie Halbert	35	Humble, Texas	Model Home Designer	4th
Lonni Paul	39	Los Angeles, California	Interior Design Business Owner	3rd
Dan Vickery^{2}	27	Portland, Oregon	Interior Designer/Bartender	2nd
Antonio Ballatore	40	Los Angeles, California	Set Designer	1st

Guest Designers:

Designer	Age	Current City
Gary Andrews	40	Los Angeles, California
Alissa Sutton	30	Midland, Texas

- ^{1} Age at the time of the show's filming
- ^{2} Dan Vickery did audition for Design Star Season 3 but was not picked to compete

== Contestant progress ==
Place	Contestant	1	2	3	4^{1}	5	6	7	8	9	Comments
1	Antonio	HIGH	HIGH	IN	HIGH	HIGH	HIGH	IN	IN	WINNER	Winner of Design Star season 4
2	Dan	HIGH	HIGH	HIGH	HIGH	HIGH	LOW	LOW	IN	RUNNER-UP	Elimin: Season 4 Finale
3	Lonni	HIGH	IN	LOW	IN	IN	HIGH	HIGH	OUT		Elimin: Celebrity Homes
4	Torie	IN	IN	HIGH	IN	HIGH	LOW	OUT			Elimin: The Longest Yard
5	Jason	LOW	IN	LOW	IN	LOW	OUT				Elimin: Kids as Clients
6	Nathan	HIGH	LOW	HIGH	LOW	OUT					Elimin: Homes of the Brave
7	Jany	IN	IN	IN	OUT						Elimin: Think Inside The Box
8	Tashica	LOW	LOW	IN	OUT						Elimin: Think Inside The Box
9	Jen	LOW	LOW	OUT							Elimin: White Room Challenge
10	Amy	HIGH	OUT								Elimin: Dueling Kitchens
11	NataLee	OUT									Elimin: Design Your Hollywood Home

(WINNER) The designer won the competition.
(RUNNER-UP) The designer received second place.
(WIN) The designer was selected as the winner of the episode's Elimination Challenge.
(HIGH) The designer was selected as one of the top entries in the Elimination Challenge, but did not win.
(IN) The designer was not selected as either top entry or bottom entry in the Elimination Challenge, and advanced to the next challenge.
(LOW) The designer was selected as one of the bottom entries in the Elimination Challenge, but was not deemed the worst of the designers who advanced in that particular week.
(LOW) The designer was selected as one of the bottom two entries in the Elimination Challenge, and was deemed the worst of the designers who advanced in that particular week.
(OUT) The designer was eliminated from the competition.
(OUT) The designer was eliminated from the competition before the judges deliberated.

- ^{1} In a Design Star first, Tashica was eliminated before the judges' deliberation. This was due to her underwhelming performance in the competition, constant excuses, and lack of ability to have her design ideas expressed in a team situation. It reached the ultimatum in the fourth episode, and Vern Yip questioned why he and the other two judges kept bringing her back week after week. While she continued giving more excuses, he and the judges quickly decided to eliminate her. As the elimination in the episode was a double elimination, this change did not affect anything else, and Jany was eliminated normally.

The first season the winner never was in bottom 3 or 2
