= HGTV Design Star season 1 =

This season is the first season of HGTV Design Star. It features 10 designers competing for their own show on HGTV.

== Designers ==
Designer	Age^{1}	Current City	Occupation	Place
Ramona Jan	50	Damascus, Pennsylvania	Found-Object Artist	10th
Joseph Kennard	41	Boston, Massachusetts	Architect/Business Owner	9th
Vanessa Deleon	26	New York City, New York	Designer/Business Owner	8th
Teman Evans	26	Brooklyn, New York	Architect/Designer	7th
Teran Evans	26	Brooklyn, New York	Architect/Designer	6th
Donna Moss	49	Arlington, Texas	Designer/Flight Attendant	5th
Temple McDowell	30	Farmington, Utah	Design Enthusiast/Single Mom	4th
Tym DeSanto	46	Fort Wayne, Indiana	Artist/Entrepreneur	3rd
Alice Fakier	31	Temple, Texas	Designer/Business Owner	2nd
David Bromstad	32	Miami, Florida	Artist/Designer	1st

- The winning Design Star was David Bromstad, who went on to host Color Splash. David and Alice each also won a brand new Mercury Mariner.
- ^{1} Age at the time of the show's filming

== Contestant progress ==
Place	Contestant	1	2	3	4^{1}	5	6	7	Vote	Comments
1	David	HIGH	IN	WIN	IN	HIGH	ADV	IN	WINNER	Winner of Design Star season 1
2	Alice	IN	LOW	HIGH	IN	WIN	ADV	IN	RUNNER-UP	Elimin: Design Star Finale
3	Tym	IN	HIGH	LOW	IN	LOW	OUT			Elimin: Create a Dream Room
4	Temple	IN	IN	HIGH	LOW	OUT				Elimin: Designing with Color
5	Donna	LOW	IN	HIGH	OUT					Elimin: $10,000 Kitchen Makeover
6	Teran	HIGH	HIGH	LOW	OUT					Elimin: $10,000 Kitchen Makeover
7	Teman	IN	HIGH	OUT						Elimin: 'Wild Card' Design
8	Vanessa	WIN	LOW	OUT						Elimin: 'Wild Card' Design
9	Joseph	IN	OUT							Elimin: Designing to Sell
10	Ramona	OUT								Elimin: Design a New York City Townhouse

The designer won America's vote and the competition.
The designer lost America's vote and received second place.
The designer advanced to the finale.
The designer was selected as the winner of the episode's Elimination Challenge.
The designer was selected as one of the top entries in the Elimination Challenge, but did not win.
The designer was not selected as either top entry or bottom entry in the Elimination Challenge, and advanced to the next challenge.
The designer was selected as one of the bottom entries in the Elimination Challenge, but was not deemed the worst of the designers who advanced in that particular week.
The designer was selected as one of the bottom two entries in the Elimination Challenge, and was deemed the worst of the designers who advanced in that particular week.
The designer was eliminated from the competition.
The designer was eliminated outside the panel from the competition.

^{1} In the fourth episode, the designer with the worst design in the clients' eyes would be eliminated outside of the judging panel. The worst design was Teran's, and so he was cut. The design deemed best was Temple's.

== Episodes ==
1. "Design a New York City Townhouse"
2. "Designing to Sell"
3. "'Wild Card' Design"
4. $10,000 Kitchen Makeover"
5. "Designing with Color"
6. "Create a Dream Room"
7. "Glass Houses"
8. "Finale"
