= HGTV Star season 8 =

HGTV Star
- Season 8

Release
- Original network: HGTV
- Original release: June 9 – July 21, 2013

Season chronology
- ← Previous; All Stars

The eighth and final season of the American reality television competition series HGTV Star premiered on June 9, 2013. The series had been renamed from "Design Star" for this new edition. David Bromstad returned for his second season as host, and Sabrina Soto joined the show, along with returning judges Vern Yip and Genevieve Gorder.

Tiffany Brooks was the winner.

== Designers ==
Designer	Age^{1}	Current City	Place
Tobin Green	36	Tampa, Florida	10th
Jessie Miller	31	St. Louis, Missouri	9th
Tylor Devereaux	42	Grand Rapids, Michigan	8th
Cris Mercado	27	Miami, Florida	7th
Abby Vasek	35	Wimberley, Texas	6th
Boris Eckey	35	Los Angeles, California	5th
Anne Rue (Fan Favorite)	41	Lake Mary, Florida	4th
Brooks Atwood	39	Brooklyn, New York	2nd/3rd
Jeribai Tascoe	33	Sonora, California	2nd/3rd
Tiffany Brooks	33	Antioch, Illinois	1st

- Age is at the time of the show's filming

== Elimination Table ==
Place	Contestant	Episodes						
Place	Contestant	1	2	3	4	5	6	7
1	Tiffany	IN	HIGH	WIN	LOW	WIN	WIN	WINNER
2-3	Brooks	WIN	HIGH	WIN	IN	LOW	LOW	RUNNER-UP
2-3	Jeribai	HIGH	HIGH	HIGH	HIGH	LOW	WIN	RUNNER-UP
4	Anne	LOW	WIN	HIGH	WIN	WIN	OUT	
5	Boris	HIGH	LOW	LOW	IN	OUT		
6	Abby	HIGH	LOW	LOW	OUT			
7	Cris	LOW	IN (+)	OUT				
8	Tylor	IN	IN (-)	OUT				
9	Jessie	IN	OUT					
10	Tobin	OUT						

(WINNER) The designer won the competition.
(RUNNER-UP) The designer received second place.
(WIN) The designer was selected as the winner of the episode's elimination challenge.
(HIGH) The designer was selected as one of the top entries in the elimination challenge, but did not win.
(IN) The designer advanced to the next challenge, but was not selected as a top nor a bottom entry in the elimination challenge.
(LOW) The designer was selected as one of the bottom entries in the elimination challenge, but was not the final contestant to move on to the next round
(LOW) The designer was selected as one of the bottom entries in the elimination challenge and was the final contestant to move on to the next round.
(OUT) The designer was eliminated from the competition.
