= HGTV Design Star season 3 =

HGTV Design Star season 3 was the third season of the American reality TV home design show HGTV Design Star. The season first aired from 8 June to 3 August 2008 on HGTV in 9 weekly episodes. The season was hosted by Clive Pearse and the judges were designers Vern Yip and Cynthia Rowley. The final challenge involved renovating houses damaged during Hurricane Katrina and the winner was chosen in a vote open to viewers. The winner was Jennifer Bertrand, who won her own TV show on HGTV called Paint-Over! with Jennifer Bertrand.

== Designers ==
Designer	Age^{1}	Current City	Place
Jerome "Scottie" Miller	40	Charlotte, North Carolina	9th
D. Paul DeRouen (Fan Favorite)	33	Lafayette, Louisiana	8th
Michael Stribling	23	College Station, Texas	7th
Stephanie Cook	36	Newport Beach, California	6th
Tracee Dore	36	Louisville, Kentucky	5th
Mikey Verdugo	33	Davie, Florida	4th
Trish Beaudet	37	Shelby Township, Michigan	3rd
Matt Locke	39	Colorado Springs, Colorado	2nd
Jennifer Bertrand	32	Olathe, Kansas	1st

The winning designer was:

- Jennifer Bertrand; show: Paint-Over! with Jennifer Bertrand
- ^{1} Age at the time of the show's filming

== Contestant progress ==
Place	Contestant	1	2	3	4	5	6	7	Vote	Comments
1	Jennifer	LOW	LOW	HIGH	LOW	HIGH	IN	IN	WINNER	Winner of Design Star season 3
2	Matt	HIGH	HIGH	LOW	IN	LOW	IN	IN	RUNNER-UP	Elimin: Season 3 Finale
3	Trish	HIGH	LOW	IN	HIGH	HIGH	OUT			Elimin: Hometown Design
4	Mikey V	IN	HIGH	IN	HIGH	OUT				Elimin: Final Five Heat Up the Kitchen
5	Tracee	LOW	LOW	LOW	HIGH	OUT				Elimin: Final Five Heat Up the Kitchen
6	Stephanie	LOW	HIGH	HIGH	OUT					Elimin: Celebrity Suites
7	Michael	HIGH	HIGH	OUT						Elimin: Passport to Design
8	D. Paul	IN	OUT							Elimin: Making Design History
9	Scottie	OUT								Elimin: Home Sweet Lake Home

(WINNER) The designer won America's vote and the competition.
(RUNNER-UP) The designer lost America's vote and received second place.
(WIN) The designer was selected as the top entry in the Elimination Challenge, and was named the best of the week.
(HIGH) The designer was selected as one of the top entries in the Elimination Challenge, but did not win.
(IN) The designer was not selected as either top entry or bottom entry in the Elimination Challenge, and advanced to the next challenge.
(LOW) The designer was selected as one of the bottom entries in the Elimination Challenge, but was not deemed the worst of the designers who advanced in that particular week.
(LOW) The designer was selected as one of the bottom two entries in the Elimination Challenge, and was deemed the worst of the designers who advanced in that particular week.
(OUT) The designer was eliminated from the competition.

== Challenges ==
=== Episode 1: Meet the Cast ===
The first episode of the third season aired on Sunday, June 8, 2008, where only nine contestants were chosen out of an array of designers chosen to be flown to Los Angeles to audition. The judges had picked only eight at the end of the selection process, but allowed America to select whom they wanted to see on Design Star by a voting process on HGTV's website. The winner of the online contest was Stephanie Cook.

- First aired: June 8, 2008

=== Challenge 1: Home Sweet Lake Home ===
At the end of the first episode where the designers were chosen, Clive Pearse indicated that the selected designers would have to build their own living space near a lake in Nashville, Tennessee. The designers were given a $100,000 budget and were provided with lumber and the necessary tools to equip them in their conquest. However, in the second episode, which was a continuance of the first, Pearse indicated that this was simply a hoax and they would not have to endure building their own house. Clive took them to their lake house on a boat where the designers learned they would be designing the following rooms of their new house: living room, dining room and two bedrooms. The designs of the following four rooms can be seen on HGTV's Design Star web page where they can be voted on whether they are liked or disliked. Near the judging process, there were many disagreements and bickering followed through into the waiting room while the judges discussed the designers' fates. The winning room was the downstairs bedroom, with a bed created by Matt & Mikey V and dressed by Scottie. At the end of the first elimination, it came down to Stephanie Cook, the online winner, and ironically Scottie Miller. Mikey V's poor decisions in spatial configuration and Scottie's design theme in the upstairs bedroom led to Scottie's dismissal—even though Scottie dressed the winning bedroom in this episode.

- Area designed:
  - Living room/Sunroom: D. Paul, Michael, Tracee, Trish
  - Dining room: Jennifer and Stephanie
  - Upstairs bedroom: Matt, Mikey V and Scottie
  - Downstairs bedroom: Matt, Mikey V and Scottie
- ELIMINATED: Scottie
- First aired: June 15, 2008

=== Challenge 2: Making Design History ===
The third episode of Design Star continued with the eight remaining designers choosing one special item from a yard sale in their lake home's front yard. After the designers selected their item, they were divided into four teams of two, each designing a living room at the Oak Mansion in Spring Hill, Tennessee. The mansion has four identical living rooms, which is why the challenge was based there. The designers were challenged to incorporate the item they chose from the yard sale into their design in an innovative manner. Again, there were disagreements as the designers tried to combine their different design styles into one cohesive space. During the episode, the mansion is stated to be haunted and whether coincidence or not, objects would fly off the walls and equipment would go missing. During the elimination process, again, Tracee had difficulty relating to her partner as well as her space. Tracee, as well as D. Paul, were selected to be in the bottom two where D. Paul was eliminated because he put his team in jeopardy.

- Area designed:
  - Living Room #1: Tracee and Jennifer
  - Living Room #2: Mikey V and Stephanie
  - Living Room #3: Matt and Michael
  - Living Room #4: D. Paul and Trish
- ELIMINATED: D. Paul
- First aired: June 22, 2008

=== Challenge 3: Passport to Design ===
The fourth episode of Design Star continued with the seven remaining designers finding out that they would be traveling to an airport because they would be designing rooms around the world. When the designers arrived at the airport, they were faced with the infamous paint can with a star informing them of their location. They also found out that this was the first individual challenge with the also infamous white rooms. The designers were to create a room designed around Italy, Mexico or Thailand. One paint can was empty, which allowed that one designer choose whatever country the designer wanted. Michael chose the empty paint can and chose Spain as his design inspiration. The designers were then informed they would be able to shop at Michael's Arts and Crafts store with a budget of $500 and only 60 minutes to acquire all of their necessities for their spaces. The designers had 12 hours to create the room based on the country they have previously chosen. Before the elimination round, the designers were driven to a building where they met Angelo Surmelis, host of Rate My Space, and Lisa LaPorta, designer on Designed to Sell, and learned both of them were elated about the series and who would become the next Design Star. At the elimination round, the judges were on edge about the ways the designers brought that certain cultures through into their space. The judges did not find any reason to pinpoint one person as a possible future Design Star, which left the game field in reach for everyone. The decision on who would be eliminated, though, came down to Matt, Michael and Tracee, where Michael was eliminated for his take on a hip Spanish lounge.

- Area designed: White Room
  - Italy: Tracee and Jennifer
  - Mexico: Trish and Stephanie
  - Thailand: Mikey V and Matt
  - Spain (choice): Michael
- ELIMINATED: Michael
- First aired: June 29, 2008

=== Challenge 4: Celebrity Suites ===
The fifth episode of Design Star continued with the six remaining designers designing celebrity suites at the Gaylord Opryland Resort & Convention Center in Nashville, Tennessee. The designers were separated into two teams, dodgeball style, where the two designers with a star would be the team leaders (Jennifer and Trish), with team one consisting of Jennifer, Stephanie and Matt and team two consisting of Trish, Mikey V. and Tracee. Later, the designers were taken (in her tour bus) to discuss design options at country singer Sara Evans house. Sara Evans mentioned she was interested in shabby chic yet southern elegance. After meeting with her, the designers headed off to work on their spaces. They were given 28 hours of worktime, over a course of three days, and $15,000 to transform bland celebrity suites into a suite liked by Sara Evans. When Clive came in to announce the end of the challenge, he notified them that they would be presenting their space outside the Gaylord Opryland to show off their hosting abilities. During the elimination, team two (Trish, Mikey V and Tracee) came out on top with many elements of Sara's preferred design styles while team one failed to meet spatial configuration and style suitable for the suite. The bottom three were Matt, Stephanie and Jennifer, with Stephanie being eliminated because of a horrible couch choice.

- Area designed: Celebrity Suites
  - Team One: Jennifer, Matt, Stephanie
  - Team Two: Trish, Mikey V., Tracee
- ELIMINATED: Stephanie
- First aired: July 6, 2008

=== Challenge 5: Final Five Heat Up the Kitchen ===
The sixth episode of Design Star continued with the final five working together again as a team in order to transform a drab kitchen in 24 hours. The designers were given a $10,000 budget with Sears gift cards for appliances. The designers were first, though, placed in front of the infamous paint cans where they learned the designer choosing the star would be the team captain. Tracee became the team captain, disappointing the other designers. It was also revealed that They are hosting abilities will be tested again and two designers would be eliminated after this challenge. Before the designers began transforming the kitchen for a Nashville family of four, Trish needed medical attention to remove her wedding band that had started to cut off circulation toward her wrist after a mishap moving furniture during the first challenge left her with a swollen finger. Two firemen came to the house where the designers were making over a kitchen and removed the band. Before long, the designers began to bicker about Tracee's inability to maintain leadership in the group and she continued to prove that she was incapable of listening or following her fellow designers' requests. On the second day of the renovation, Carter Oosterhouse of HGTV's Carter Can showed up to talk with the remaining designers and encouraged them to finish their project. He told the designers that he had completed approximately 400 makeovers and always finished a project, which led the designers to scramble to do the same. The designers finish the kitchen, but failed to install a requested colorful tile backsplash due to bad time management, teamwork and leadership. When the elimination round came, the designers were faced again with a hosting challenge where Trish and Jennifer excelled. But before their hosting was taken into account, the room itself was discussed and Vern indicated that it is the first kitchen in Design Star history to be completed, but it was "boring". Martha had also stated that it was very predictable, therefore not very much a success. Tracee was the first to be an eliminated due to her inability to take responsibility for her decisions after labeling Trish's incident as a significant reason the kitchen failed. The final decision came down to Mikey V. and Matt, where Mikey V. was eliminated over his nerves in front of the camera. The final three remaining are Trish, Jennifer and Matt.

- Area designed: Kitchen makeover
  - Team Captain: Tracee
- ELIMINATED: Tracee and Mikey V.
- First aired: July 13, 2008

=== Challenge 6: Hometown Design ===
The seventh episode of Design Star continued with the three remaining designers doing another challenge, this time involving families. However, the designers did not realize that the families would be family members of their own. Clive had the three remaining designers stand in the work room where the paint cans are stored, and they watched videos from family members who needed their assistance. The designers were informed they would be designing family rooms with 26 hours and a budget of $10,000. Jennifer was sent to Iowa to help her sister, Trish was sent to Michigan where her parents are located, and Matt was sent to Colorado where his own parents live. The three designers were given the helping hand of a carpenter in this individual challenge. When the designers were finished, they headed into the elimination room where they would find out who would be the final two to participate in the final challenge. Jennifer received a decent critique in which the judges appearEd to like aspects of her design and her sister was very pleased with Jennifer’s design decisions, even though she covered the wood floor. Matt's design was well liked by his parents, but this did not cross over to the judging panel. Vern was impressed with the innovative way Matt hid the kiln, but Martha was displeased with him choosing four bulky, black, leather chairs causing an imbalance in the space. Trish's space was well liked, as well, by the three designers, even though one of the judges stated that it was rather "textbook" design, causing the elimination to be unknown at the end of the viewing. The judging came down to Trish being eliminated, with the final two being Matt and Jennifer.

- Area designed: Family member rooms
  - Location: Jennifer (Iowa), Matt (Colorado), and Trish (Michigan)
- ELIMINATED: Trish
- First aired: July 20, 2008

=== Challenge 7: Designing for America's Heroes ===
The eighth episode of Design Star continued with the final two designers traveling to New Orleans, Louisiana to make over houses for two families who were victims of Hurricane Katrina. The designers were assigned to help officers who worked after Hurricane Katrina devastated the area. The designers would be given a $20,000 budget, with Sears supplying appliances and Lumber Liquidators supplying hardwood flooring. They had a total of 36 work hours over four days to complete the challenge. The designers had to redesign the living room, the dining room and the kitchen on the budget they were given. On day one, the designers were given one carpenter to assist them with their challenge. On day two, however, they were given three carpenters, along with a previously eliminated contestant from the show, to help them with their challenge. Mikey V. and Trish returned to help them along with their makeovers. Matt chose Trish out of the paint can after he picked the one with the New Orleans knickknacks inside, which meant he decided who would get which designer first. Matt let Jennifer have Mikey V. because of his experience in carpentry. On day three of the renovation, the two eliminated designers switched; Trish went with Jennifer while Mikey V. with Matt, and the three carpenters the show had given them all followed suit. On the fourth day, however, they were not entitled to have any more assistance from others, which stressed Jennifer out because of the amount of work that was required in a 36-hour time frame. After the 4 days were finished, the designers assembled outside of the houses they redesigned to meet the judges one last time before they were, again, tested on their hosting abilities as the judges watched in an enclosed, private room. The designers then met with the two families and showed them their newly renovated rooms. Near the end of the experience, the St. Augustine High School band played for the families and the designers, and Clive announced that HGTV would be donating $5,000 to the band for its efforts to keep the town together after the tragedy. This was the final episode before America voted for whom they wanted to become the next Design Star. Voting ended on Wednesday at 10:00 A.M. Eastern time.

- Area designed: Living Room, Dining Room and Kitchen
  - Location: New Orleans, Louisiana
- First aired: July 27, 2008

=== Episode 8: America Decides! ===
The ninth episode of Design Star was the season 3 finale, where the designers met once again before an audience to find out who would be revealed as the winner. The winner of Design Star season 3 was Jennifer. Jennifer's show, entitled Paint Over, was scheduled to begin in January 2009 but did not air until September 7, 2009. The sizable delay spawned rumors that HGTV execs did not want her to win the competition and thereby canceled her show before it even aired.

- ELIMINATED: Matt
- First aired: August 3, 2008
