= McAloon =

McAloon is a surname. Notable people with the surname include:

- Gerry McAloon (1916–1987), Scottish footballer
- Karen McAloon (born 1968), American interior designer
- Paddy McAloon (born 1957), English singer-songwriter
- Sean McAloon (1923–1998), Irish piper and pipe maker
