= Divine Design =

- Starring: Candice Olson
- Country of origin: Canada

Production
- Running time: 30 minutes
- Production companies: Fusion Television, Inc.

Original release
- Network: W Network (Canada); HGTV (USA)
- Release: June 30, 2003 – April 29, 2011

Divine Design is a Canadian interior design show which airs on W Network in Canada and HGTV in the United States. It is hosted by Candice Olson, one of Canada's top designers. In the show, Olson heads a team of artisans and skilled labourers that includes Paul Daly (carpenter), Lorne Hogan (carpenter), Chico García (electrician), Edmond Joseph (seamster), Terry Edward Briceland (seamster), and Andrew Downward (painter). The half-hour show features Olson's step-by-step interior redesign of a client's living space mixed with campy comedy shorts before each commercial break. Reruns of the show are seen on Yes TV.

== Show format ==
At the start of each show, Candice meets the home owners and discusses the issues with the room. Next, Candice reveals her point of inspiration, illustrations and colour scheme to the audience. The room is cleared of all contents, then the walls are painted. Next, the lights are installed. The carpenter generally constructs at least one new custom piece in addition to helping to reset the room with all new furniture. Occasionally, Candice will use the room's existing furniture—if she does, she generally re-upholsters it. Then, the seamster hangs curtains and makes accent pillows. Finally, the room is accessorized. At the end of the show, the room is "revealed" to the homeowners. Usually before or after ads, small comedic skits are performed, such as one episode where she is seen swinging Tarzan style from lighting wiring (episode number unknown).

Throughout the program, Candice chooses a handful of specific pieces or techniques to highlight. She refers to her "elevations" and room illustrations to help guide viewers through her vision. Candice often dislikes matching furniture sets, which she calls "matchy, matchy." For example, she will often choose two very different looking nightstands for a bedroom. Candice prefers to use recessed lighting in almost all cases, using spotlights to highlight artwork or other focal points.

== Branding ==
Candice Olson published "Candice Olson on Design," a book that walks readers through her TV rooms in more complete detail. A 2-disc DVD of several episodes has also been released by PeaceArch Entertainment.

== See also ==
- Candice Tells All
