= HGTV Star =

- Also known as: HGTV Design Star (seasons 1–7)
- Presented by: Clive Pearse (2006-2009); Vern Yip (2010); Tanika Ray (2011); David Bromstad (2012-2013)
- Judges: Vern Yip; Genevieve Gorder (2009-2013); Sabrina Soto (2013); Candice Olson (2009-11); Cynthia Rowley (2006-08); Martha McCully (2006-08)
- Country of origin: United States
- No. of seasons: 8
- No. of episodes: 63

Production
- Running time: 60 minutes
- Production company: 495 Productions

Original release
- Network: HGTV
- Release: July 23, 2006 – July 21, 2013

HGTV Star, named HGTV Design Star for the first seven seasons, is an American reality competition show that premiered on July 23, 2006, on the cable television network HGTV. Clive Pearse served as host for Seasons 1–4, then judge Vern Yip served as host for Season 5, replacing Clive Pearse. HGTV'D host Tanika Ray served as host for Season 6 and Design Star Season 1 winner David Bromstad joined the show as a mentor. Bromstad later returned not only as mentor but as host, replacing Tanika Ray, for the remainder of the show including Design Star: All Stars, even though Tanika Ray was announced as host for Season 7. Vern Yip (Deserving Design), Genevieve Gorder (Dear Genevieve), and Sabrina Soto (The High/Low Project) currently serve as the show's three judges. Candice Olson ("Divine Design", "Candice Tells All") served as a judge for seasons 4 and 5; starting with season 6, a third rotating judge was brought in to fill the spot left by Olson. Previous judges include Cynthia Rowley, a designer of fashion and home accessories; and Martha McCully, Executive Editor of InStyle magazine.

The contestants compete for their own design show on HGTV, which follows the format of The Next Food Network Star on sister channel Food Network. Each week, the judges decide whom to eliminate; and, in Seasons 1–4, Clive Pearse would tell the contestant(s) who had been eliminated, "Your show has been cancelled...please exit the studio."

Each week, the remaining contestants participate in an interior design challenge such as designing a living space with a specific purpose (bedroom, livingroom, garage) or creating a space in an empty room, using unconventional items from a pet store, mechanics store, or a discount store. The designers are given a specified amount of time and cash to create their designs, sometimes working alone and sometimes in teams.

The series was cancelled after eight seasons. On November 2, 2020, it was announced that a spin-off titled Design Star: Next Gen will premiere in 2021.

== Cast ==
=== Presenters ===
Presenters	Seasons								
Presenters	1	2	3	4	5	6	7	AS	8
Clive Pearse	♦	♦	♦	♦					
Vern Yip					♦				
Tanika Ray						♦			
David Bromstad							♦	♦	♦

=== Judges ===
Judges	Seasons								
Judges	1	2	3	4	5	6	7	AS	8
Vern Yip	♦	♦	♦	♦	♦	♦	♦	♦	♦
Cynthia Rowley	♦	♦	♦						
Martha McCully	♦	♦	♦						
Genevieve Gorder				♦	♦	♦	♦	♦	♦
Candice Olson				♦	♦	♦			
Sabrina Soto									♦

== Seasons ==
Season	No. of designers	Premiere Date	Finale Date	Location	Winner	Winner's Show	Runner‑up	Third Place
1–2006	10	July 23	September 10	New York City	David Bromstad	Color Splash	Alice Fakier	Tym De Santo
2–2007	11	July 29	September 16	Las Vegas	Kim Myles	Myles of Style	Todd Davis	Will Smith
3–2008	9	June 8	August 3	Nashville	Jennifer Bertrand	Paint-Over!	Matt Locke	Trish Beaudet
4–2009	11	July 19	September 13	Los Angeles	Antonio Ballatore	The Antonio Treatment	Dan Vickery	Lonni Paul
5–2010	12	June 13	August 22	New York City	Emily Henderson	Secrets from A Stylist	Michael Moeller	Casey Noble
6–2011	12	July 11	September 12	New York City	Meg Caswell	Meg's Great Rooms	Karl Sponholtz	Mark Diaz
7–2012	12	May 29	July 24	Los Angeles	Danielle Colding	Shop This Room	Brittany Simon	Hilari Younger
All Stars‍–‍2012	6	July 31	August 28	Los Angeles	Leslie Ezelle	N/A	Hilari Younger	Tom Vecchione
8–2013	10	June 9	July 21	Los Angeles	Tiffany Brooks	The Most Embarrassing Rooms in America	Brooks Atwood; Jeribai Tascoe	Anne Rue

=== Season 1 ===
- Winner: David Bromstad
- Location: New York City, New York
- Host: Clive Pearse
- Judges: Vern Yip, Cynthia Rowley, Martha McCully

=== Season 2 ===
- Winner: Kim Myles
- Location: Las Vegas, Nevada
- Host: Clive Pearse
- Judges: Vern Yip, Cynthia Rowley, Martha McCully

=== Season 3 ===
- Winner: Jennifer Bertrand
- Location: Nashville, Tennessee
- Host: Clive Pearse
- Judges: Vern Yip, Cynthia Rowley, Martha McCully

=== Season 4 ===
This was Clive Pearse's final season as host, and two new judges (Olson and Gorder) joined the panel.

- Winner: Antonio Ballatore
- Location: Los Angeles, California
- Host: Clive Pearse
- Judges: Vern Yip, Candice Olson, Genevieve Gorder

=== Season 5 ===
Season 5 featured a new producer and a new format. Prop stylist Emily Henderson won the competition; and her show, Secrets from a Stylist, premiered August 29, 2010.

- Winner: Emily Henderson
- Location: New York City, New York
- Host: Vern Yip
- Judges: Vern Yip, Candice Olson, Genevieve Gorder

=== Season 6 ===
This season features Tanika Ray as host and David Bromstad as mentor. It premiered on July 11, 2011.

- Winner: Meg Caswell
- Location: New York City, New York
- Host: Tanika Ray
- Judges: Vern Yip, Candice Olson, Genevieve Gorder
- Mentor: David Bromstad

=== Season 7 ===
This season features David Bromstad as host and mentor. It premiered on May 29, 2012.

- Winner: Danielle Colding
- Location: Los Angeles, California
- Host: David Bromstad (Tanika Ray was originally announced as host)
- Judges: Vern Yip, Genevieve Gorder
- Mentor: David Bromstad

=== All Stars ===
This season features David Bromstad as host and mentor. It premiered on July 31, 2012.

- Winner: Leslie Ezelle
- Location: Dallas, Texas
- Host: David Bromstad
- Judges: Vern Yip, Genevieve Gorder
- Mentor: David Bromstad

=== Season 8 ===
This season was the last to feature David Bromstad as the host and mentor. It premiered on June 9, 2013.

- Winner: Tiffany Brooks
- Location: Los Angeles, California
- Host: David Bromstad
- Judges: Vern Yip, Genevieve Gorder, Sabrina Soto
- Mentor: David Bromstad

== See also ==
- Ellen's Design Challenge
- Designer Superstar Challenge
