= HGTV Design Star season 5 =

The fifth season of HGTV Design Star premiered on June 13, 2010. The series returned to New York City for the new season. Clive Pearse did not return to host. Instead, Vern Yip served as both lead judge and host. Candice Olson and Genevieve Gorder both returned for their second season as judges. As part of the elimination process this season, the designers up for elimination are taped presenting their designs so the judges can evaluate their preparedness to host a series. The winner of this season was prop stylist Emily Henderson. Her show Secrets From a Stylist was aired as a special one-hour premiere on August 29, 2010, where she redesigned the Los Angeles home of Ian Brennan, her friend and the co-creator of Glee. HGTV has since ordered twenty-six more episodes of Secrets From a Stylist, which are due to air in 2011.

== Designers ==
Designer	Age	Current City	Place
Julie Khuu	29	Santa Ana, California	12th
Tera Hampton	41	Austin, Texas	11th
Trent Hultgren	41	Venice, California	10th
Daniel Grady Faires (Fan Favorite)	26	Springdale, Arkansas	9th
Nina Ferrer	31	New York City, New York	8th
Stacey Cohen	35	Chicago, Illinois	7th
Tom Vecchione	46	New York City, New York	6th
Alex Sanchez	26	Washington, DC	5th
Courtland Bascon	38	Los Angeles, California	4th
Casey Noble	32	Redondo Beach, California	3rd
Michael Moeller	30	New York City, New York	2nd
Emily Henderson	29	Portland, Oregon	1st

- ^{1} Age at the time of the show's filming

== Contestant progress ==
Place	Contestant	1	2	3	4^{1}	5	6^{2}	7^{1}	8	9	10	Comments
1	Emily	LOW	IN	HIGH	HIGH	HIGH	HIGH	LOW	IN	IN	WINNER	Winner of Design Star season 5
2	Michael	HIGH	HIGH	IN	HIGH	HIGH	HIGH	IN	LOW	IN	RUNNER-UP	Runner-up of Design Star season 5
3	Casey	HIGH	IN	HIGH	HIGH	WIN	HIGH	WIN	IN	OUT		Elimin: The Glass House Challenge
4	Courtland	LOW	WIN	IN	LOW	LOW	LOW	IN	OUT			Elimin: Too Many Cooks in the Kitchen
5	Alex	LOW	HIGH	LOW	LOW	HIGH	WIN	OUT				Elimin: Sears Catalog Kitchen Challenge
6	Tom	LOW	HIGH	IN	HIGH	IN	OUT					Elimin: Getting Trumped
7	Stacey	HIGH	IN	HIGH	HIGH	IN	OUT					Elimin: Getting Trumped
8	Nina	WIN	LOW	WIN	LOW	OUT						Elimin: New York's Bravest Makeovers
9	Dan	HIGH	HIGH	HIGH	OUT							Elimin: Flower Power
10	Trent	LOW	HIGH	OUT								Elimin: Musical Instrument-Inspired Room
11	Tera	HIGH	OUT									Elimin: Fashion-Forward Room Design
12	Julie	OUT										Elimin: White Room Challenge

(WINNER) The designer won the competition.
(RUNNER-UP) The designer received second place.
(WIN) The designer was selected as the winner of the episode's Elimination Challenge.
(HIGH) (Episodes 1 and 4) The designer was selected as one of the top individual entries in the Elimination Challenge, but did not win.
(HIGH) (Episodes 2-3, 5-6) The designer was on the winning team, but was not selected as the winner of the Elimination Challenge.
(IN) (Episodes 2-3, 5-6) The designer was on the losing team, reported to the studio for elimination, but was not selected as one of the bottom two designers.
(IN) (Episodes 7-9) The designer was not selected as either a top entry or a bottom entry in the Elimination Challenge, and advanced to the next challenge.
(LOW) The designer was selected as one of the bottom individual entries in the Elimination Challenge.
(LOW) The designer was selected as one of the bottom two entries in the Elimination Challenge and was up for elimination.
(OUT) The designer was eliminated from the competition.

^{1} The judges were unable to select a winning team space and switched to judging the designers individually.

^{2} The judges decided to do a double elimination because of how angry they were with the red team. Their designs were not to par with the level of luxury and class Trump brand represents. (Stacey, Tom, Courtland). Stacey and Tom were eliminated.

== Challenges ==
=== Challenge 1: White Room Challenge ===
The designers are paired, and each must design a room based on his or her partner's personality. Nina wins the challenge, although her partner Courtland complains that she "threw [him] under the bus" by misleading him as to her style preferences. Julie and Emily are the bottom two, and Julie is eliminated.

- ELIMINATED: Julie
- First aired: June 13, 2010

=== Challenge 2: Fashion-Forward Room Design ===
The designers are divided by sex, and each designer selects a piece of fashion from a runway show. The challenge is to incorporate the fashion into the design of a one-bedroom apartment. The Men's team wins the challenge, and Courtland is the over-all winning designer. Tera and Nina face off in the bottom two, with Nina remaining and Tera eliminated.

- ELIMINATED: Tera
- First aired: June 20, 2010

=== Challenge 3: Musical-Instrument-Inspired Room ===
It is again men vs. women, with the women selecting Dan to join them to balance the numbers. Each team member chooses a musical instrument to incorporate into the design of an outdoor patio. Nina emerges as the over-all winner as her team won the challenge. Trent and Alex are the bottom two. With Trent expressing his discomfort with the dynamic, the judges eliminate him.

- ELIMINATED: Trent
- First aired: June 27, 2010

=== Challenge 4: Flower Power ===
Each designer selects a flower. Teams design a studio apartment, drawing inspiration from each flower in the team's bouquet while making sure each designer's flower is represented. Vern warns the designers that simply translating the color palette of the flowers into the room will lead to elimination. The judges are unable to declare a winning team and switch to judging the designers on their individual merits. Alex and Dan are the bottom two, and Dan is eliminated.

- ELIMINATED: Dan
- First aired: July 11, 2010

=== Challenge 5: New York's Bravest Makeovers ===
The designers are shuffled into two new teams. Nina, Courtland, Tom, and Stacey are the Red Team; and Alex, Michael, Casey, and Emily are the Blue Team. They are challenged to design rooms for a New York City Fire Department firehouse, with each designer tasked to inject a signature design element into his or her space. The Red Team is designing for Engine 5; and the Blue Team, for Engine 18. The Blue Team wins, despite Michael's being out for much of day two after a nail gun injury to his thumb. Casey is selected as this episode's top designer and was especially lauded for her work on a firefighter silhouette. The Red Team is shocked to learn that the judges were "physically angry" about its design, with harsh criticism for each signature element except Stacey's. Nina and Courtland are the bottom two, and Nina is eliminated.

- ELIMINATED: Nina
- First aired: July 18, 2010

=== Challenge 6: Getting Trumped ===
The designers are again split into teams. Alex, Casey, Emily, and Michael are the Blue Team; and Courtland, Tom, and Stacey are the Red Team. The challenge is to design a model apartment for the Trump Plaza Residences in Jersey City, New Jersey. Guest judge Donald Trump Jr. advises the teams to keep the Trump brand of luxury in mind. Each designer also selects a package of souvenirs that must be incorporated into the apartment. The Blue Team prevails, and Alex is named the over-all winner. The judges are so appalled by the Red Team's work, in general, and by Stacey, in particular, that they eliminate her before the host presentations. Tom is also eliminated, and Courtland is warned that he has no more chances.

- ELIMINATED: Stacey, Tom
- First aired: July 25, 2010

=== Challenge 7: Sears Catalog Kitchen Challenge ===
Guest judge John Gidding (of HGTV's Curb Appeal) substitutes for Candice. Emily moves to the Red Team with Courtland, and the designers are challenged to design a kitchen to be used in a photo shoot for a Sears catalog. Each team selects a cultural-theme basket for inspiration, and each designer must choose an item from the basket to incorporate into the team design. The Red Team chooses the Italian basket, and the Blue Team selects the French basket. Because the judges believe both teams did so well, no winning team is chosen; Casey is named the winning individual designer. The other four designers each record a hosting presentation. Alex and Emily are the bottom two designers, and Alex is eliminated.

- ELIMINATED: Alex
- First aired: August 1, 2010

=== Challenge 8: Too Many Cooks in the Kitchen Challenge ===
Following a four-course brunch prepared by chef Aarón Sanchez, the designers must make over dining spaces by repurposing materials that are already in the spaces. Additionally each designer must select one of the four dishes as their individual inspiration. Courtland (empanada) and Casey (tamale) are the Red Team, and Michael (fruit salad) and Emily (huevos rancheros) are the Blue Team. After viewing all four hosting presentations, the judges eliminate Courtland.

- ELIMINATED: Courtland
- First aired: August 8, 2010

=== Challenge 9: The Glass House Challenge ===
The remaining designers—Casey, Emily, Michael—are tasked to design a sunroom that incorporates both their own personal style and their concept for an HGTV series. Season 4 winner Antonio Ballatore stops by to offer encouragement, and each designer gets help from a friend from home. Casey is eliminated.

- ELIMINATED: Casey
- First aired: August 15, 2010

=== Challenge 10: Lights! Camera! Action! ===
The final two designers, Michael and Emily, prepare a television presentation with the help of the eliminated contestants. Each finalist shoots an extended presentation of their proposed series using an eliminated designer as inspiration. Emily chooses Tom because their personal styles are so different, and Michael chooses Nina because he knows she will challenge his creativity. Michael is eliminated, and Emily becomes the new Design Star.

- HGTV Design Star winner: Emily
- ELIMINATED: Michael
- First aired: August 22, 2010
