= HGTV Design Star season 6 =

The sixth season of the American reality television competition series HGTV Design Star premiered July 11, 2011. The two major additions to the show were Tanika Ray as host, and David Bromstad as mentor.

== Designers ==
Designer	Age^{1}	Current City	Place
Blanche Garcia	32	Montclair, New Jersey	12th
Alisha "J" Allen	31	Chevy Chase, Maryland	11th
Doug Hines	44	Atlanta, Georgia	10th
Bret Ritter	30	Brooklyn, New York	9th
Tyler Wisler	35	Orange, New Jersey	8th
Cathy Hobbs	42	Brooklyn, New York	7th
Leslie Ezelle	43	Dallas, Texas	6th
Kevin Grace	42	Chicago, Illinois	5th
Kellie Clemets (Fan Favorite)	33	Edmond, Oklahoma	4th
Mark Diaz	33	Miami, Florida	3rd
Karl Sponholtz	42	Chicago, Illinois	2nd
Meg Caswell	33	Chicago, Illinois	1st

- ^{1} Age at the time of the show's filming

== Contestant progress ==
Place	Contestant	1	2	3	4	5	6	7	8	9	10	Comments
1	Meg	IN	LOW	IN	WIN	IN	IN	LOW	WIN	IN	WINNER	Winner of Design Star Season 6
2	Karl	WIN	IN	HIGH	HIGH	IN	LOW	WIN	LOW	IN	RUNNER-UP	Runner-up of Design Star Season 6
3	Mark	LOW	WIN	LOW	HIGH	HIGH	WIN	HIGH	LOW	OUT		Elimin: Tiny Houses
4	Kellie	HIGH	IN	HIGH	IN	WIN	IN	LOW	OUT			Elimin: The Look For Less
5	Kevin	LOW	HIGH	WIN	LOW	LOW	HIGH	OUT				Elimin: HGTV'd
6	Leslie	HIGH	IN	IN	IN	IN	LOW	OUT				Elimin: HGTV'd
7	Cathy	HIGH	LOW	IN	LOW	WIN	OUT					Elimin: Wedding Reception
8	Tyler	IN	HIGH	IN	IN	OUT						Elimin: Dream Kitchen
9	Bret	LOW	IN	LOW	OUT							Elimin: Bed & Breakfast
10	Doug	IN	IN	OUT								Elimin: Old Room, New Life
11	J	IN	OUT									Elimin: White Box Challenge
12	Blanche	OUT										Elimin: Make Over Your Living Space

(WINNER) The designer won the competition.
(RUNNER-UP) The designer received second place.
(WIN) The designer was selected as the winner of the episode's Elimination Challenge.
(WIN) The designer was selected as the winner of the episode's Camera Challenge.
(HIGH) The designer was selected as one of the top entries in the Elimination Challenge, but did not win.
(IN) The designer was not selected as either top entry or bottom entry in the Elimination Challenge, and advanced to the next challenge.
(LOW) The designer was selected as one of the bottom entries in the Elimination Challenge, but was not deemed the worst of the designers who advanced in that particular week.
(LOW) The designer was selected as one of the bottom entries in the Elimination Challenge, and was deemed the worst of the designers who advanced in that particular week.
(OUT) The designer was eliminated from the competition.

== Challenges ==
=== Make Over Your Living Space ===
The designers get into 6 teams of two and design bedrooms, a great room, and a bonus room.

- First Aired: July 11, 2011
- ELIMINATED: Blanche

=== White Box Challenge ===
The eleven remaining designers design white rooms.

- First Aired: July 18, 2011
- ELIMINATED: J

=== Old Room, New Life ===
The ten remaining designers design rooms in their first homeowner challenge.

- First Aired: July 25, 2011
- ELIMINATED: Doug

=== Bed & Breakfast ===
The nine remaining designers design rooms at a home.

- First Aired: August 1, 2011
- ELIMINATED: Bret

=== Dream Kitchen ===
The eight remaining designers design dream kitchens.

- First Aired: August 8, 2011
- ELIMINATED: Tyler

=== Wedding Reception ===
The seven remaining designers design a wedding reception.

- First Aired: August 15, 2011
- ELIMINATED: Cathy

=== HGTV'd ===
- First Aired: August 22, 2011

It is Design Star meets HGTV'd as the designers help an HGTV fan and her family renew their home. The finalists, who will renovate the house and will each be responsible for a different room in the home. This week's hosting requires that each finalist show how good they are by showcasing an on-camera reveal of their rooms to the homeowners.

- GUEST JUDGE: John Gidding
- ELIMINATED: Leslie, Kevin

=== Look For Less ===
The four remaining designers design rooms with a budget of $2,500

- First Aired: August 29, 2011
- ELIMINATED: Kellie

=== Tiny Houses ===
The three remaining designers must transform an 86 sq. ft. house into a home with a kitchen, bathroom, living area, bedroom, and dining area.

- First Aired: September 5, 2011
- ELIMINATED: Mark

=== The Next Design Star Is? ===
The two finalists must each redesign a room in a Harlem brownstone while shooting a pilot episode for their proposed HGTV series.

- First Aired: September 12, 2011
- ELIMINATED (RUNNER-UP): Karl
- Winner: Meg Caswell
