= Daniel Grady Faires =

Dan Grady Faires
- Born: July 29, 1983 (age 43); Fayetteville, Arkansas
- Education: University of Arkansas (B.S.)
- Occupation: Reality television personality
- Years active: 2009-present
- Television: HGTV Design Star
- Spouse: Dasha Faires
- Website: danielgradyfaires.com

Daniel Grady Faires (born July 29, 1983) is a contractor, interior designer and craftsman, who was born in Fayetteville, Arkansas.

== Personal life ==
Daniel Faires graduated from the University of Arkansas with a bachelor's degree in Biology.

Faires operates an interior design and contract company, a furniture business called Capsule Furniture and a homegoods store, Lonesome Whistler, that sells a combination of hand-made objects, vintage items, and designer goods.

== Television career ==
He entered the reality television genre in October 2009 when he competed to become DIY Network's next “Studfinder”. Soon after, he was selected as one of the final 12 contestants for season five of HGTV’s design-based reality television competition HGTV Design Star, on which he was voted Fan Favorite.

As of 2011, he is the host of HGTV.com’s DanMade, a video series that highlights "sustainable and budget-friendly design", and he appears in videos for footwear sold by Sears.
