= The Antonio Treatment =

- Genre: Home renovation Docu-design
- Starring: Antonio Ballatore
- Country of origin: United States
- Original language: English
- No. of seasons: 2
- No. of episodes: 27

Production
- Producer: Scout Productions
- Running time: 42 minutes

Original release
- Network: HGTV
- Release: January 1, 2010 – May 28, 2011

The Antonio Treatment is a one-hour weekly docu-design series show on HGTV and is hosted by Antonio Ballatore, who won Season 4 of the HGTV reality show Design Star. The pilot episode aired on January 1, 2010 and the show officially premiered March 14, 2010,

Ballatore and his crew of craftsmen transform homes into radical, custom creations. They make over rooms in homes and offices to Ballatore's design style. The series follows him as he explores new locations and design techniques, developing his craft, and finding his niche in the world of interior design.

== Episodes ==
=== Series overview ===
Season	Episodes	Originally released	
Season	Episodes	First released	Last released
1	13	January 1, 2010	October 2, 2010
2	14	February 26, 2011	May 28, 2011

=== Season 1 (2010) ===
The pilot episode was shown on January 1, 2010. Season 1 premiered on March 14, 2010 with back to back episodes.

No. overall	No. in season	Title	Original release date
1	1	"The Gift of Music"	January 1, 2010
Antonio reaches into his past and brings a music studio back to life.
2	2	"Sign for Design"	March 14, 2010
Antonio divides a family room into a functional workspace for a deaf man.
3	3	"Mario Lopez's Home Gym"	March 14, 2010
It's Antonio vs. Mario Lopez in the ultimate celebrity boxing home gym makeover!
4	4	"Fashionable Redesign"	March 21, 2010
Antonio makes over a punk rock clothing store.
5	5	"Thread on Arrival"	March 28, 2010
Antonio Transforms three rooms for a clothing designer and her adorable baby.
6	6	"Southern Exposure"	August 15, 2010
Antonio Brings Southern Charm To A Cupcake Cafe.
7	7	"Little Bar With A Big Need"	August 22, 2010
Antonio reaches into his past and brings a music studio back to life.
8	8	"Antonio Creates The Ultimate Rock And Roll Hollywood Hotel Suite."	September 4, 2010
Antonio Creates The Ultimate Rock And Roll Hollywood Hotel Suite.
9	9	"Culture Shock"	September 4, 2010
Antonio Integrates Nature and Modern Design Into A Couple's Lifeless Condo.
10	10	"Design Club"	September 11, 2010
Antonio "draws up" a creative space for the Hollywood Boys and Girls Club.
11	11	"A Magical Makeover"	September 18, 2010
Antonio gives an unusual couple (one a magician, the other a dancer) a rustic living room.
12	12	"Rock 'n Roll Bachelorette Pad"	September 25, 2010
Antonio Creates A Glam Living Room and Lounge for a Rock Band Manager
13	13	"Less Talk, More Rock"	October 2, 2010
Antonio designs a stylishly vintage home for a family in a fifties time warp.

=== Season 2 (2011) ===
On August 16, 2010, HGTV announced it had ordered an additional 13 episodes for a second season.

No. overall	No. in season	Title	Original release date
1	14	"Asian Bedroom Family Retreat"	February 26, 2011
Linda and her husband, John, are having trouble with their master bedroom, which has become sort of a storage room, and a family hang-out for them, their two daughters, and their dog. The room is crowded with chairs, family photos, and John's giant TV.
2	15	"Photographer's Live/Work Loft"	March 19, 2011
Levi is having trouble with his one-bedroom loft, which he would like to both live in AND run his photography business from. The room is crowded with a huge L-shaped couch and a huge bed, with no room left over for business.
3	16	"Parisian Entertaining Parlor"	March 14, 2011
John would love to entertain in his living room, but it is currently filled with a heating stove, a huge plush couch and a huge wooden coffee table, with no room for guests.
4	17	"Spanish Style Living Room"	March 21, 2011
Kitty lives in a beautiful old Spanish-Style house, but has no idea how to get the most out of the old architecture in her living room. She has a large picture window with an arched top, and doesn't know how to find a window dressing in that shape. And while she has a gorgeous old fireplace with Mexican tiles, that doesn't go with the overall beige color of the room.
5	18	"Antonio Pledges Alpha Phi"	March 26, 2011
The Alpha Phi sorority house at Cal State Northridge only houses six students, but all 115 girls use the house. Antonio meets Kathi and Yukiko, the President and Vice President of the Northridge Chapter, and they take him through their current house. The greatroom has two main areas, one they use for meetings and homework, and another that is more of a lounge and TV room, but both are in bad shape. The room is just beige and boring, one side has old carpet, and couches are everywhere, some blocking doors.
6	19	"Newlywed Poolside Bedroom"	April 2, 2011
Antonio helps a newlywed couple create a poolside bedroom.
7	20	"Indie Rock Influences"	April 9, 2011
Antonio creates a music-themed entertainment space.
8	21	"Modern Two-Story Glass Living Room (Park 1 of 2)"	April 16, 2011
Heather and Kevin got the deal of a lifetime, buying their dream home. But they bought it as is and have been spending all their time just making it livable, they are out of ideas for the huge two-story glass-walled living room that seems to radiate the hot California sun.
9	22	"Modern Two-Story Glass Living Room (Part 2 of 2)"	April 16, 2011
Heather and Kevin got the deal of a lifetime, buying their dream home. But they bought it as is and have been spending all their time just making it livable, they are out of ideas for the huge two-story glass-walled living room that seems to radiate the hot California sun.
10	23	"Cozy Natural Wood Retreat"	April 23, 2011
Lara and Russell have a living room they can't stand. It has a floor to ceiling carpeted kitty condo, a huge rock fireplace, and a bunch of overstuffed furniture. They need Antonio and his team to give them a cozy living room they can't wait to get home to.
11	24	"Contemporary Art Master Bedroom"	May 7, 2011
Craig and Angel have a small crowded bedroom, most of which is taken up by their large bed that their small children sometimes join them in.
12	25	"Modern Loft Kitchen"	May 14, 2011
Phil and Leona moved into their downtown loft months ago but have yet to build a kitchen.
13	26	"Family Entertaining and Screening Room"	May 21, 2011
Willow and Luci have an outdated and under-utilized family room. They often entertain large groups and need a better space.
14	27	"Modern Craftsman Bedroom"	May 28, 2011
Antonio designs a craftsman bedroom for a young couple.
