= Deserving Design =

- Genre: Reality, Home improvement
- Created by: Vern Yip
- Directed by: Debbie Levin
- Starring: Vern Yip
- Country of origin: United States
- Original language: English
- No. of seasons: 1
- No. of episodes: 13

Production
- Executive producers: Jeff Hudson; Ed Horwitz; Eric Schotz
- Producer: Hal Issacson
- Running time: 24 minutes

Original release
- Network: HGTV (USA)
- Release: September 9 – November 14, 2007

Deserving Design is a half-hour show on the Home and Garden TV network, starring Vern Yip. In each episode an inspirational family or individual is visited by Yip, who show him two different rooms they would like to have redesigned. Yip will pick one of the rooms to do and have the person or family aid in its design. However, Yip always surprises them by secretly redoing the other room, usually while covertly having them offer input into it, or by giving them some other special gift.

== Host ==
Formerly a designer on The Learning Channels's Trading Spaces, Vern Yip has acted as a judge on HGTV's "The Next Design Star" for the 2006 to 2012 competitions. Deserving Design is Yip's first solo show and he considers it to be his "best work yet." The idea for the show came to Yip after he made an appearance on Oprah where he helped do a home project for a waitress and her mother, and he hopes it will both entertain and inspire viewers.

== Episode list ==
The first season's episodes are being aired out of order from their actual production numbers. This list presents them in the order of production.

No.	Title	Original release date	Prod. code
1	"Helping Out Hurricane Katrina Victims"	September 12, 2007	HDDSN-101
Tyra, Gladdis, and their two daughters lost their home to Hurricane Katrina. Tyra and the daughters moved to Hollywood to let the girls work on their dream of being comedians while the dad stayed behind in Louisiana to rebuild. Vern makes over the girl's shared bedroom. Surprises: made over Mom's bedroom, Vern has their few surviving wedding photos restored, and he flies the dad to Hollywood to see his family for the first time in three months.
2	"Haunted House"	October 31, 2007	HDDSN-102
Dennis and Christine Jenovese run an annual Halloween haunted house in their neighborhood to raise money to support the Cystic Fibrosis Foundation. Vern gives their master bedroom a luxurious make over. Surprise room: family room
3	"Help for a War Hero"	October 13, 2007	HDDSN-103
An Iraq war veteran's garage is remade into a new play space for his kids. Surprise room: the boy's shared bedroom
4	"Vern To The Rescue!"	September 9, 2007	HDDSN-104
Scott is a volunteer firefighter working to move up the professional level. Vern gives Scott, and his fiancé Liz, a redesigned bedroom to better fit the needs of two, including adding a second closet. Surprise room: living room (which they see first due to having to walk through it to get to the bedroom)
5	"New Kitchen for New Lifestyle"	November 21, 2007	HDDSN-105
A woman who lost a lot of weight gets a new kitchen. Surprise room: master bedroom
6	"A Family Room for Everyone"	September 19, 2007	HDDSN-106
A family with quadruplets gets a family room makeover. Surprise room: the parent's bedroom
7	"Dream Kitchen"	October 10, 2007	HDDSN-107
Harry and Melissa used all of their money to buy their first home only to have to completely gut it after discovering a major mold infestation. Even the walls had to be ripped out and replaced. They are out of money and can't afford to finish the renovations, leaving the pair and their two kids with many bare rooms. Vern turns the skeleton kitchen into the Tuscan inspired one the family had dreamed of when they first bought the house, including appliances, dishes, and cookware. Surprise room: family room
8	"Community Leader Gets Makeover Treat"	October 20, 2007	HDDSN-108
A woman who spent 10 years cleaning up her neighborhood of crime and trash while neglecting her own home has her water damaged living room redone. Surprise room: Large hallway/hang out space
9	"Vern's Wedding Gift"	October 17, 2007	HDDSN-109
A couple married for 10 years and plagued with bad luck starts a new life in Atlanta where Vern redoes their living room and dining room. Surprise: Vern throws the couple a wedding reception so they recapture the memories lost by their photographer the first time around.
10	"Vern's Musical Surprise"	November 7, 2007	HDDSN-110
Middle school teacher Robert Weatherly integrates his love of music into his lessons and frequently donates musical instruments and lessons to students. Vern redoes the living room in his 400-square-foot carriage house. Surprise room: passageway between kitchen and living converted to music room
11	"Vern Makes a Special Delivery"	October 20, 2007	HDDSN-111
Two elementary school teachers get a new nursery for their first child. Surprise room: kitchen
12	"Community Activist Honored"	September 24, 2007	HDDSN-112
The creator of The Eagle Connection, an organization to help homeless women, gets a new dine. Surprise room: master bedroom
13	"A Kidney for a Friend"	November 14, 2007	HDDSN-113
When Amanda Dolly learned her coworker, Judy, was suffering from kidney failure, she donated one of her kidneys to help save her life. Vern visits Amanda and her husband Dale to redesign their pool pavilion into an outdoor room. Surprise room: master bedroom
