= Stay Here =

American reality television series on Netflix

- Genre: Reality television
- Starring: Genevieve Gorder; Peter Lorimer
- Country of origin: United States
- Original language: English
- No. of seasons: 1
- No. of episodes: 8

Production
- Executive producers: Tom Forman; George Verschoor; Will Spjut; Jon Beyer; Brad Bishop; Genevieve Gorder; Steve Joachim
- Producer: Meredith Wright
- Cinematography: Jordan Eady
- Editors: Sam Eskandari; Karin Hoving; Tyler Jenkins; Jason Kristen; Ryan Morrell; Alexandra Platt; Dan Tivin; Breia White
- Running time: 30–33 minutes
- Production companies: Hoosick Falls Productions; Shake Media; Critical Content

Original release
- Network: Netflix
- Release: August 17, 2018

Stay Here is an American reality television series on Netflix that focuses on home improvements. The show's first season of 8 episodes was released on Netflix on August 17, 2018. It features Genevieve Gorder, an interior designer, and Peter Lorimer, a real estate broker, transforming homeowners' short-term rental homes into moneymakers across the United States. Episodes include a houseboat in Seattle, Washington, a brownstone in Brooklyn, New York, and a firehouse in Washington, D.C.

== Main cast ==
- Genevieve Gorder
- Peter Lorimer

== Episodes ==
| No. | Title | Filming location | Original release date |
|---|---|---|---|
| 1 | "Seattle Houseboat" | Seattle, Washington | August 17, 2018 |
A married couple's floating vacation rental goes from a claustrophobic money pit to a romantic waterfront retreat with a rooftop deck.
| 2 | "Malibu Beach House" | Malibu, California | August 17, 2018 |
A widow's weathered seaside bungalow becomes a dazzling oceanfront villa with luxurious views and high-end amenities.
| 3 | "Austin Pool Pad" | Austin, Texas | August 17, 2018 |
A struggling property with a headstrong owner isn't turning a profit despite a pool, a charming exterior and the perfect location.
| 4 | "Brooklyn Brownstone" | Brooklyn, New York | August 17, 2018 |
A big and affordable Bed-Stuy rental caters to crowds. But it falls short on layout and design -- and connecting its guests to local attractions.
| 5 | "Paso Robles Wine Country Cottage" | Paso Robles, California | August 17, 2018 |
A couple turns their dated vineyard cottage into an upmarket rental for destination weddings, unique experiences and elegant outdoor living.
| 6 | "Hudson River Carriage House" | Hudson, New York | August 17, 2018 |
A vacant carriage house with vintage charm is a blank canvas for business opportunity -- and an interior designer's dream.
| 7 | "Palm Springs Time Machine" | Palm Springs, California | August 17, 2018 |
A colorful couple goes all-in on outrageous 1970s decor to turn their one-of-a-kind vacation rental into an upscale desert jewel.
| 8 | "DC Firehouse" | Washington, D.C. | August 17, 2018 |
A historic firehouse in the nation's capital gets a family-friendly makeover that honors its roots -- and its ties to the local community.
