= My Lottery Dream Home =

American TV series

- Genre: Reality television
- Presented by: David Bromstad
- Country of origin: United States
- Original language: English
- No. of seasons: 19
- No. of episodes: 223

Production
- Camera setup: Single camera
- Running time: 20–28 minutes
- Production company: Beyond Productions US

Original release
- Network: HGTV
- Release: March 7, 2015 – present

My Lottery Dream Home is an American reality television series on HGTV featuring home buyers who have won lotteries or suddenly inherited a large sum of money. It is hosted by David Bromstad. It premiered on March 7, 2015. It is produced by 7Beyond (now Beyond Productions US), a joint venture between Beyond International and Seven Network.

On January 1, 2021, a spin-off hosted by Laurence Llewelyn-Bowen titled My Lottery Dream Home International premiered.

== Premise ==
The show follows David Bromstad as he helps lottery winners find a luxurious property after striking it rich.

== Production ==
Season 1 premiered on March 7, 2015. Season 2 premiered on January 6, 2017. Season 3 premiered on June 2, 2017. Season 4 premiered on February 9, 2018. Season 5 premiered on September 21, 2018. Season 6 premiered on January 1, 2019. Season 7 premiered on April 5, 2019. Season 8 premiered on December 13, 2019. Season 9 premiered on November 20, 2020. Season 10 premiered on May 7, 2021. Season 11 premiered on November 12, 2021. Season 12 premiered in 2022. Season 13 premiered in 2022.

== Series overview ==
Season	Episodes	Originally released	
Season	Episodes	First released	Last released
1	12	March 7, 2015	March 11, 2016
2	12	January 6, 2017	March 24, 2017
3	14	June 2, 2017	February 2, 2018
4	14	February 9, 2018	June 15, 2018
5	14	September 21, 2018	December 14, 2018
6	14	January 1, 2019	March 29, 2019
7	14	April 5, 2019	December 6, 2019
8	13	December 13, 2019	April 10, 2020
9	7	November 20, 2020	January 1, 2021
10	10	May 7, 2021	July 9, 2021
11	8	November 12, 2021	March 4, 2022
12	15	July 8, 2022	October 14, 2022
13	11	November 25, 2022	April 14, 2023
14	11	August 11, 2023	October 20, 2023
15	7	January 5, 2024	February 16, 2024
16	12	April 5, 2024	July 19, 2024
17	16	October 4, 2024	June 6, 2025
18	17	July 18, 2025	January 30, 2026
19	2	March 13, 2026	2026

== Episodes ==
=== Season 1 (2015–16) ===
No. overall	No. in season	Title	Original release date	US viewers (millions)
1	1	"A Couple Finds a California Dream Home to Make Millionaire Memories"	March 7, 2015	N/A
Lottery winners search for a dream home in Riverside County, Calif., with a lot of acreage, a large kitchen and six or more bedrooms.
2	2	"A Lottery Winning Couple Finds a Home for Their Dogs in Minnesota"	March 7, 2015	N/A
A couple wants to find a home near Stillwater, Minn., with an open floor plan and a barn in which to train German Shepherds.
3	3	"New Jersey Minister Finds a Dream Home That Doubles as a Wedding Venue"	January 1, 2016	N/A
Lottery winners must choose between "Old Indian Estate," "Llewellyn Carriage House," and "The Ryerson."
4	4	"Scratch Me Lucky California Dream Home"	January 1, 2016	N/A
After winning money on a scratch-off ticket, jackpot winners search for their dream home by the waterfront.
5	5	"Ohio Couple Find Family Friendly Dream Home After Winning a Second Chance Draw"	January 8, 2016	N/A
A couple from Ohio look for their dream home in a nice neighborhood to raise their son.
6	6	"Florida Estate Agent Searches for a Dream Home With a View"	January 15, 2016	N/A
A Florida real estate agent wants to find his million dollar dream home in Jacksonville, Fla., but may decide to buy more than one property.
7	7	"Lottery Winners Search for Their Dream Home in the Hamptons"	January 22, 2016	N/A
Lottery winners search for their dream home in the Hamptons, and they have a huge wish list that includes a mother-in-law suite and many bathrooms.
8	8	"Downtown Dream Home"	January 29, 2016	N/A
A young woman wants to find a modern bachelorette pad in downtown Indianapolis that she can style herself.
9	9	"Work-Weary Parents Use Their 1 Million Dollar Lottery Win to Buy a Family Vacation Dream Home"	February 5, 2016	N/A
A busy family wants to use lottery winnings to buy a waterfront vacation home in Gulf Shores, Alabama.
10	10	"Vegas Dream Home"	February 26, 2016	N/A
After winning money on a scratch ticket, a retired boxer wants to find a house in Las Vegas for his family.
11	11	"Big House Hunting"	March 4, 2016	N/A
With their tiny Columbus, Ohio, house overflowing with "stuff," a jackpot-winning couple wants to find their dream home.
12	12	"Texas Dream Home"	March 11, 2016	N/A
After a father wins the Texas Lottery, his daughter searches for a dream home on Possum Kingdom Lake.

=== Season 2 (2017) ===
No. overall	No. in season	Title	Original release date	US viewers (millions)
13	1	"Dreaming on the Chesapeake Bay"	January 6, 2017	N/A
A retired couple seek a vacation home to be closer to their family along the Virginia Coast; in a battle of priorities, it is size versus having a great view.
14	2	"California Dreaming"	January 13, 2017	N/A
After winning $5 million from the lottery, Josh wants a big piece of land in California.
15	3	"Music City Dream Home for Kansas Lottery Winners"	January 20, 2017	N/A
After winning the lottery, a Kansas couple decide to move to Nashville; their dream home needs enough space to house their five grown children during the holidays.
16	4	"Lucky in Louisville"	January 27, 2017	N/A
Todd bought a lottery ticket on the way home from his daughter's baby shower, and now can provide a home to raise her near family and friends.
17	5	"A Little Piece of Quiet in Indiana"	February 3, 2017	N/A
After couch surfing and living paycheck to paycheck, Craig can now buy the peaceful and quiet land he has wanted in rural Indiana.
18	6	"Utah Mountain Dream Home"	February 10, 2017	N/A
Nelly and Pablo were married for just a few months when they won the Wyoming Powerball, and can now afford their dream home in the mountains of Utah that is big enough for their whole extended family.
19	7	"Paradise in Puerto Rico"	February 17, 2017	N/A
Ana and Rafael had always planned on retiring from their life in New York City to paradise in Puerto Rico, so when Ana won $1 million, they found they could retire early and buy their dream home sooner rather than later.
20	8	"Coast of Dreams"	February 24, 2017	N/A
Massachusetts native Linda was unable to afford her own home until she won $4 million, and now can buy her dream house in her hometown.
21	9	"Show-Me State Dream Home"	March 3, 2017	N/A
After a $3 million scratch off win, Brandon, Hannah and baby Naomi can finally move from their one-bedroom rental to a beautiful family dream home in Missouri with a big yard.
22	10	"Sweet Dream Home Alabama"	March 10, 2017	N/A
Kathy and her son Gene decide to return to their southern roots by moving back to Alabama and enjoying the fishing and painting.
23	11	"The Good Life in Nebraska"	March 17, 2017	N/A
Winner Carla looks for the home of her dreams in Fremont, Neb.
24	12	"A Home on the Cape"	March 24, 2017	N/A
A mother shops for a dream home with her daughters in Cape Cod, Mass.

=== Season 3 (2017–18) ===
No. overall	No. in season	Title	Original release date	US viewers (millions)
25	1	"A Family Affair"	June 2, 2017	N/A
A husband and wife decide they want to live close to their eldest son in Buffalo, N.Y.
26	2	"Brotherly Luck"	June 9, 2017	N/A
Two brothers are fortunate to reap the benefits of their parents' lottery win and search for their very own dream homes in Sarasota, Fla.
27	3	"Lake House Lottery"	June 16, 2017	N/A
A couple's lakeside retirement dream is now a reality after they won on a Massachusetts scratch-off ticket.
28	4	"A Fairytale Fortune"	August 4, 2017	N/A
A couple hopes to move from their tiny rental apartment into the home of their dreams near Washington after winning a million dollars on a Virginia scratch off.
29	5	"A Mexican Dream"	August 11, 2017	N/A
A California couple already has their forever home, so after winning a million dollars in the lottery, they set out to find a dream vacation home.
30	6	"Dreaming Big in Boston"	August 18, 2017	N/A
A young Massachusetts couple with six kids felt cramped in their water damaged two-bedroom house, but after winning, they're finally able to buy a home big enough for their huge family.
31	7	"Mom's Million"	August 25, 2017	N/A
After winning a million dollars, a woman gives her son her old condo in Ponte Verde Beach, Fla. and seeks a home big enough for her and her hobbies.
32	8	"Deano and Carissa: A Scratch Made in Heaven"	September 8, 2017	N/A
After winning a state record $7 million on a single scratch ticket, a Midwest dad hunts for the perfect family home for his partner and kids in their rural Indiana neighborhood.
33	9	"Gail and Chet: Boston Dream Garden"	September 15, 2017	N/A
After two years of searching, a woman's dream of living in the Boston suburbs is finally within reach after winning $1 million on a Massachusetts scratch off.
34	10	"Gone With the Win"	January 5, 2018	N/A
A woman that won the lottery with 19 of her coworkers dreams of a new life with her fiance, which includes a grand Tennessee mansion.
35	11	"A Million-Dollar View in Orange County"	January 12, 2018	N/A
A pair of siblings vowed to their late father they would always look out for one another, so when one won the lottery, he didn't hesitate to split it; they now have the chance to re-create cherished family holidays in New Hampshire.
36	12	"The Maine Attraction"	January 19, 2018	N/A
A former carpenter and his fiance want to fulfill a lifelong dream of living on the coast of Maine after winning the lottery.
37	13	"The Luckiest Cape"	January 26, 2018	N/A
A single mother and her 14-year-old son get the chance to fulfil their dream of moving out of their tiny one-bedroom sublet and into a bigger place of their own in Cape Cod.
38	14	"A Family Fortune"	February 2, 2018	N/A
After thinking his scratch-off only won him a couple hundred bucks, a man scans his card to find out it carries a worth of $750,000, so the family shops for the home of their dreams.

=== Season 4 (2018) ===
No. overall	No. in season	Title	Original release date	US viewers (millions)
39	1	"Florida Dreaming"	February 9, 2018	N/A
After winning $1 million on a Florida scratcher, a couple realizes their dream of owning their own house and land in North Port, Fla.; she wants a gourmet kitchen and resort pool, and he wants huge backyard to grow fruit trees.
40	2	"Lakehouse Luxury"	February 16, 2018	N/A
After renting a holiday cabin at the same lake for 36 years, a couple's $2 million Florida State Lottery win means they can now make it a permanent second home; traveling to Dale Hollow Lake, David unlocks a hidden paradise in Tennessee.
41	3	"Minnesota Millions"	February 23, 2018	N/A
David Bromstad returns to his hometown in Minnesota to help a couple find their dream home after winning $1 million on a Powerball ticket; they will now be able to accommodate all of their children, dogs and cars in luxurious style.
42	4	"Million-Dollar Siblings"	March 2, 2018	N/A
Siblings vowed to their late father they would always look out for one another, so when one won the lottery, he did not hesitate to split it. Together, they now have the chance to recreate cherished family holidays in New Hampshire by buying a home.
43	5	"Young and Rich"	March 9, 2018	N/A
After a lucky $4 million win, a 27-year-old man keeps his head and plans a brilliant future; his mom watches with pride as he plans to go from tenant to landlord of his very own home.
44	6	"Milk Money"	March 16, 2018	N/A
Fran stops by the grocery store for milk and comes home a multimillionaire from a lottery win; she and her partner Sharon plan to retire and want to find their dream home in Suffield, Conn.
45	7	"Family Fortune"	March 23, 2018	N/A
A Massachusetts mom came home from grocery shopping with an extra four million dollars in her pocket.
46	8	"California Chick House"	March 30, 2018	N/A
A young-at-heart grandmother wants to buy the perfect house that's big enough to entertain her family, but small enough to maintain it herself.
47	9	"Million Dollar Bull's-Eye"	April 6, 2018	N/A
After winning a million dollars on a scratcher, a New Hampshire couple can now afford to buy their first family home.
48	10	"Follow Me to Tennessee"	May 11, 2018	N/A
A couple wins a million dollars, but instead of buying their own dream home, they want to buy one for their son that they can live in, too; David Bromstad has to find the perfect extended family home in Knoxville, Tenn., that meets everyone's needs.
49	11	"Canadian Dream"	May 18, 2018	N/A
After winning over $1.7 million, Lana and Shannon want to move back to their hometown in British Columbia, Canada where they hope to find a forever home to raise their active kids.
50	12	"Papa's Palace"	June 1, 2018	N/A
Grandpa Jeff takes his babysitting duties very seriously, so when he wins $1 million in Roanoke, Va., he knows his dream home has to include a large backyard for his four grandchildren; David shows Jeff some great properties with plenty of pasture.
51	13	"My Big Fat Lottery Property"	June 8, 2018	N/A
Single mother Wendy wins $200,000 a year for life, and she can finally treat herself to a dream home; she wants to move back to Lake City, Fla., to be closer to her family, and she desperately wants to live on a big piece of land.
52	14	"Bliss In The 'burbs"	June 15, 2018	N/A
David Bromstad helps a lottery-winning couple on their hunt for the perfect forever home just outside of St. Louis.

=== Season 5 (2018) ===
No. overall	No. in season	Title	Original release date	US viewers (millions)
53	1	"My Lottery Dream Stable"	September 21, 2018	N/A
When Jorge, Jackie and their daughter, Jillian, win $5 million on a Florida scratcher, they can finally buy the horse ranch they've dreamed about; David meets up with them in Loxahatchee, Fla., to help find the perfect house, land and stables.
54	2	"Little Sister, Big House"	September 28, 2018	N/A
When a work colleague wanted to take a chance on some lottery scratchers, Ashley was happy to join in; one million dollars later, Ashley can move out of her rental in Cape Girardeau, Mo., and buy her first home with her winnings.
55	3	"Tallahassee Dream Team"	October 5, 2018	N/A
Shane won $1 million on a scratch card, so he and his partner Crystal are searching for a dream home in Tallahassee, Florida. Crystal wants a beautiful home that's move-in ready, and Shane wants a huge yard for their two dogs.
56	4	"Texas Beach House"	October 12, 2018	N/A
After becoming a millionaire on a Vegas slot machine, Rick immediately bought his own dream home; now David Bromstad joins him in Galveston, Texas, to help him spend his extra cash on a Texas Beach House for the whole family.
57	5	"The Long Island Dream"	October 19, 2018	N/A
After winning $3 million on a scratcher, a couple can afford to buy a home in their old neighbourhood of Northport, Long Island; they must decide if they want to purchase a waterfront property or get more value for their money away from the coast.
58	6	"Ten Million to One"	October 26, 2018	N/A
Demolition man John beat the odds and won $10 million on a Massachusetts lottery ticket and he is now ready to kick off his work boots and retire into flip-flops in Hollywood, Fla.
59	7	"Waterfront Windfall"	November 2, 2018	N/A
A couple was approaching a chilly retirement when they won $1 million on a Canadian National Lottery; they're now ready to move to Nova Scotia, Canada, where David Bromstad will show them gorgeous lake and oceanfront properties.
60	8	"Moving on Up in California"	November 2, 2018	N/A
After the rise of Silicon Valley, a couple in nearby San Jose, Calif., that never owned a home thought they would rent forever until he won $1 million on a scratch-off; David Bromstad is ready to help them find their dream home.
61	9	"Athol Family Dream Home"	November 9, 2018	N/A
A dedicated wife, mother and lottery player with a daily scratch ticket ritual was finally rewarded after seven years of perseverance; her $1 million win has her family looking for a dream home in Western Massachusetts.
62	10	"Beginner's Luck"	November 16, 2018	N/A
A lottery skeptic won $1 million on the first scratch ticket she ever bought; now, with the help of property ace David Bromstad, she and her husband set out to buy the perfect retirement palace in sunny Florida.
63	11	"Luck of the Irish"	November 23, 2018	N/A
Bill and Eric hit the jackpot on the St. Patrick's Day lottery and couldn't believe their good luck; the happy couple and their twins need David's help finding a larger family home on Chicago's classy North Shore.
64	12	"Champaign Moments"	November 30, 2018	N/A
After purchasing a scratch card at a local garage and winning a million dollars, Scott and Paige are looking to upgrade their family home in Champaign, Ill.; David Bromstad sets out with the couple to help them find the perfect property.
65	13	"Four-Million-Dollar Smile"	December 7, 2018	N/A
Jesus never won more than a hundred dollars from the lottery, until his luck changed when he bought a $20 scratcher that netted him a $4 million win; this car-crazy millionaire now needs a new pad to house all his flashy new rides in Kankakee, Ill.
66	14	"IT Geek to Rich and Chic"	December 14, 2018	N/A
A self-confessed computer nerd finally came up with a $1 million win after consistently spending $6 a week on lottery tickets; it's up to David Bromstad to help him find the perfect bachelor pad in the historic seaside town of Milford, Conn.

=== Season 6 (2019) ===
No. overall	No. in season	Title	Original release date	US viewers (millions)
67	1	"Old Florida Charm"	January 1, 2019	N/A
When a New York couple wins $7 million on the lottery, the two say goodbye to hard work in the Big Apple and hello to sunny retirement in Vero Beach, Fla.; they shop for the perfect property in a corner of the Sunshine State that oozes Florida charm.
68	2	"Payday in V-A"	January 1, 2019	N/A
An attorney and single father of a 3-year-old son scores $1 million on the Mega Millions; he gets ready to move out of his rental and find the perfect father-son forever home in beautiful Richmond, Va.
69	3	"A Hero's Reward"	January 4, 2019	N/A
After lady luck rewards a retired firefighter for a lifetime of service with a big win, dream-home hunter David Bromstad helps him search for the perfect bachelor pad in the Lakeland region of Florida.
70	4	"Cabin Fever"	January 11, 2019	N/A
A $5 million lottery win has one lucky New York woman looking for a lakefront vacation cottage where she can relax with her girlfriends; although she wants to keep it simple, David steps in to find some perfect properties in the majestic Adirondacks.
71	5	"A Place on Pamlico Sound"	January 18, 2019	N/A
After scratching her way to a million-dollar win, a woman and her husband upsize their retirement plans to include a place on the shores of Pamlico Sound in North Carolina; David Bromstad helps them navigate one of the largest lagoons.
72	6	"Old Charm for Newlyweds"	January 25, 2019	N/A
When Laura and John got engaged, they got a surprise early wedding gift in the form of a $1 million win on a scratch card; now this young couple is looking for a home with some old-fashioned charm and space to start a family in Worcester, Mass.
73	7	"Mr. Double Lucky"	February 1, 2019	N/A
When Michael wins $100,000 on a scratcher, he can't believe his luck... until he wins $750,000 just five weeks later; he looks for David's help to find a townhouse close by his daughter and her family so he can watch his grandson grow.
74	8	"The House Always Wins"	February 8, 2019	N/A
A professional poker player with a total winning pot of $4 million is ready to buy a huge family home along Philadelphia's Main Line area; he challenges David Bromstad to find him a modern home unique enough for his quirky aesthetic.
75	9	"Florida Windfall"	February 15, 2019	N/A
A Florida couple wins $15 million; David Bromstad steps in to help them decide whether they should buy a luxurious beachfront condo or move into a larger home away from downtown Miami with a pool to entertain family and friends.
76	10	"New Love, New Home"	March 1, 2019	N/A
Million-dollar winner Marcie is back and she's in love; life has changed a lot for her since David helped her find the perfect dream home on Cape Cod so she's ready to trade up for a couple's cottage in the South Shore Corridor of Massachusetts.
77	11	"Beach House Perfection"	March 8, 2019	N/A
After accidentally picking up a Megaplier instead of his usual weekly lottery ticket, Andy won a whopping $5 million; he has now enlisted David to help him find the perfect beach house for all his family to enjoy on the Outer Banks of North Carolina.
78	12	"Lucky In Las Vegas"	March 15, 2019	N/A
After a man hit it big in Vegas on his wife's birthday, a couple is ready to find a quiet spot where they can raise their family away from the bright lights of the Strip; David works to find the perfect family home far from the commotion of the city.
79	13	"The Dream Begins in Vegas"	March 22, 2019	N/A
Lottery winners are given the chance to start a new life together by getting married and buying their dream home in Las Vegas with their $1.6-million winnings; they have an eye for design and want to put their stamp on whatever house they choose.
80	14	"Lakeside Bonanza"	March 29, 2019	N/A
After deciding to pass the time with a scratcher, a man and his family found themselves $10 million richer; they are now looking for their dream home by the lake in Orlando and David is excited to show them an impressive list of homes to choose from.

=== Season 7 (2019) ===
No. overall	No. in season	Title	Original release date	US viewers (millions)
81	1	"Big Sky Dream Home"	April 5, 2019	N/A
Daniel and Marcia won $1 million in the state lottery and can now afford to buy a dream home in Montana to accommodate their big family; Daniel wants a ranch on 200 acres of land, but Marcia would like something more manageable.
82	2	"Lucky in Lafayette"	April 26, 2019	N/A
This Louisiana man was homeless and crashing on his son's couch when he won $2 million; now David Bromstad is helping the lucky overnight millionaire find the perfect property in Lafayette where he can party with his family and enjoy his fortunes.
83	3	"Some Like It Hotter"	May 3, 2019	N/A
After their retirement got a lot warmer with a $1-million New York scratcher win, a couple is following their best friends to Punta Gorda, Fla., where they hope David will help them buy into a classy retirement village.
84	4	"Reinvention in Las Vegas"	May 10, 2019	N/A
After winning big on a scratcher, a California single mom is ready to leave her mobile home, job and old life behind for a new start in Las Vegas; David is ready to show her three very different locations to see which one is just right.
85	5	"Fort Worth Fortune"	May 17, 2019	N/A
A professional poker player and his family are looking for their ultimate dream home in Fort Worth, Texas; David Bromstad's expertise is needed to find a place big enough to fit dad, mom and their three small children.
86	6	"Winning Big in Florida"	May 31, 2019	N/A
A man who won big is ready to buy a new home in Cape Coral, Florida., with his wife. They look to David Bromstad for his real estate expertise, and David finds potential properties with reasonable price tags and breathtaking scenic waterways.
87	7	"Delaware Dream Home"	June 7, 2019	N/A
Real estate expert, David Bromstad, helps a fun-loving couple find a home in quiet and relaxed Bethany Beach, Delaware, with their $1 million winnings.
88	8	"Make Me a Millionaire"	June 14, 2019	N/A
David Bromstad helps a young family of four search the suburbs outside Boston for the perfect family dream home with much elbow room and a yard big enough for a swing set and pool.
89	9	"Virginia Beach Forever"	June 21, 2019	N/A
After serving in the U.S. Air Force for six years, a couple decides to look for their dream home in the military-friendly town of Virginia Beach, Va.; with a $100,000 settlement to be used for a down payment, David helps them on their house hunt.
90	10	"Newlywed Millionaires"	June 28, 2019	N/A
After these newlyweds bought a lotto ticket at a gas station, they filled up both their gas tank and their bank account; the instant millionaires are now searching for their dream home in Columbus, Ohio, where they can start a family.
91	11	"The Sound of Freedom"	November 15, 2019	N/A
A couple with two kids was looking for a home on Whidbey Island, Wash., when he won $200,000 from the lottery; with the extra money in their budget, David Bromstad helps them find the home of their dreams.
92	12	"Mass Cash Stash"	November 22, 2019	N/A
A couple in Orange, Mass., was struggling to make ends meet until she won $4 million from the lottery and changed their lives; David Bromstad helps them find a home with tons of square footage and a huge backyard for their dog.
93	13	"Almost Throwing Away a Million"	November 29, 2019	N/A
After her husband saved a lottery ticket worth $1 million from going in the trash, a woman calls on David Bromstad to help them find a home in Cleveland, Ohio, with space to entertain her entire family during the holidays.
94	14	"League City Limits"	December 6, 2019	N/A
After a million-dollar win, a Texas couple wants to get rid of their small home; they call on David Bromstad to find their League City dream home that has plenty of space for their teenagers to spread out.

=== Season 8 (2019–20) ===
No. overall	No. in season	Title	Original release date	US viewers (millions)
95	1	"Winner Winner Chicken Dinner"	December 13, 2019	N/A
Patty won a million dollars on a scratch-off and can't wait to find the house of her dreams with the help of David Bromstad. She and her sister-in-law have targeted the upmarket suburb of Spring Hill, Florida, for their search.
96	2	"The Great American Dream Home"	December 27, 2019	N/A
Brenda and Jesse were living in a tiny apartment in Columbus, Ohio, when they won a million-dollar lottery. Now, David Bromstad takes them on an emotional and memorable journey to help them find their American dream home.
97	3	"Finding the Perfect Lake House"	January 1, 2020	N/A
A New York couple who won a million dollars on a single scratcher can finally buy the second home on Oneida Lake that they've always dreamed of.
98	4	"Bangor or Bust"	January 1, 2020	N/A
Nick won $100,000 from a scratch off and now he and his wife Robyn want to buy their forever home in Bangor, Pennsylvania; David Bromstad is challenged to find them a single-family home on a very small budget.
99	5	"Follow Your Nose"	January 3, 2020	N/A
A woman and her husband are on the hunt for their dream home after winning a million dollars on a Powerball ticket. However, it must pass his sniff test first.
100	6	"A Slice of New Jersey Paradise"	January 17, 2020	N/A
A former police officer couple win the lottery in Bergen County, New Jersey, making a better life for themselves and their five kids. They call on David Bromstad to find a property that fits their large family and meets their sky-high expectations.
101	7	"On the Throne"	January 31, 2020	N/A
Billy won a million dollars on a scratch-off and changed his family's life, no longer living paycheck to paycheck; they need David Bromstad's help to find a forever home in Knoxville, Tenn., that fits their $180,000 budget.
102	8	"Buy Now, Inherit Later"	February 21, 2020	N/A
A construction worker won $250,000 and is looking for a new home close to his eight adult daughters. David Bromstad shows him a variety of homes!
103	9	"Sparkle in the Sunshine State"	March 6, 2020	N/A
After winning $1 million, a couple seeks a home in Jupiter, Fla., which is renowned for the lifestyle it offers to the rich and famous; Florida's booming population and low stock challenge David Bromstad to find a glamorous home at the right price.
104	10	"Lucky Lakeside"	March 13, 2020	N/A
After winning in the powerball, a Connecticut couple wants a lake home where they make memories with their kids. David hunts for the perfect haven on the lakes of East Haddam and guides the couple through lake house ups and downs.
105	11	"South Shore Score"	March 20, 2020	N/A
A couple who have been living in a tiny apartment in Boston have won big and now want to find a new home. David Bromstad helps them find a house with a big garden.
106	12	"A Mansion for Mom"	March 27, 2020	N/A
A man's hard work pays off when he wins $7 million after playing the same set of numbers for three years; instead of buying a home for himself, he hopes David can help him find a Texas mansion for his mom where she can enjoy her twilight years.
107	13	"The Love Nest"	April 10, 2020	N/A
Two newlyweds from Iowa are on the hunt for large home after winning big on a scratch card. David helps them find a home spacious enough to start a family in.

=== Season 9 (2020–21) ===
No. overall	No. in season	Title	Original release date	US viewers (millions)
108	1	"500,000 Reasons to Party"	November 20, 2020	N/A
David helps a woman who won $500,000 find a home with space to entertain.
109	2	"The Lottery Queen"	November 27, 2020	N/A
David Bromstad helps an avid gambler find a townhouse she can make her own.
110	3	"Mountain High Dreams"	December 4, 2020	N/A
A couple struggles to agree on a budget for their mountain vacation home.
111	4	"Holiday Extravaganza"	December 11, 2020	N/A
Dream homes, family and decorating are a few of David's favorite things!
112	5	"First-Time Forever Home"	December 18, 2020	N/A
David is on his A-game looking for a home for a couple in construction.
113	6	"A Spacious Win"	December 25, 2020	N/A
David Bromstad helps a single mom find a home with space for everyone.
114	7	"G'ma's Pad"	January 1, 2021	N/A
David Bromstad helps a tattooed grandma find a big house she can share.

=== Season 10 (2021) ===
No. overall	No. in season	Title	Original release date	US viewers (millions)
115	1	"Vacation Time at the Cape"	May 7, 2021	N/A
David works fast to help a couple snatch up their perfect Cape Cod home.
116	2	"King and Queen of M'Orlando"	May 14, 2021	N/A
David helps newlyweds feel like royalty in a two-story Orlando dream home.
117	3	"Gone Fishin' for a Dream Home"	May 21, 2021	N/A
David helps empty nesters find a Louisiana home with a nearby fishing hole.
118	4	"So Young, So Rich"	May 28, 2021	N/A
David helps a young winner find a NC home with pretty livestreaming spaces.
119	5	"Million-Dollar Wonderland"	June 4, 2021	N/A
David helps a couple compromise in a snow-covered real estate adventure.
120	6	"Border Town Bonanza"	June 11, 2021	N/A
David helps his winners look forward to the summer in a house with a pool.
121	7	"Million-Dollar Baby"	June 18, 2021	N/A
David is happy to help a new family find a bigger home near Binghamton, NY.
122	8	"Six Million Reasons to Smile"	June 25, 2021	N/A
David takes a Florida family on a spree full of sun, sand and lavish homes.
123	9	"From Portland to Paradise."	July 2, 2021	N/A
David helps a formerly homeless man soak up the Florida sunshine in style.
124	10	"A Million-Dollar Hug"	July 9, 2021	N/A
David leads the way as a mother of two searches for their PA dream home.

=== Season 11 (2021–22) ===
No. overall	No. in season	Title	Original release date	US viewers (millions)
125	1	"Mortgage Free in Atlanta"	November 12, 2021	N/A
David shows a family how far their money can go in the Atlanta suburbs.
126	2	"To Son, With Love"	November 26, 2021	N/A
David aims to stay on a budget with some surprising fixer uppers in CT.
127	3	"Seven Million Big Ones"	December 3, 2021	N/A
David helps two EMTs find a home near the warm waters of Cap Coral, FL.
128	4	"Cashed up in Cartersville"	December 10, 2021	N/A
David helps a lucky family buy a lot of house just outside of Atlanta.
129	5	"California Dreams"	December 17, 2021	N/A
David helps a family find a California home with a bedroom for everyone.
130	6	"Oh, My Goodness!"	January 14, 2022	N/A
David helps two empty nesters find a dream forever home for their children.
131	7	"Rags to Riches"	January 21, 2022	N/A
David guides a couple through buying a home with a lawn in Winter Park, FL.
132	8	"Massachusetts Millions"	January 28, 2022	N/A
David leads a couple on a historic and haunted home search in Salem, MA.

== My Lottery Dream Home International ==
My Lottery Dream Home International, hosted by Laurence Llewelyn-Bowen, premiered on 1 January 2021.
