= CW Now =

- Logo of CW Now
- Starring: Mario Lopez; Tanika Ray
- Country of origin: United States
- No. of seasons: 1
- No. of episodes: 23

Production
- Running time: 30 minutes
- Production companies: Telepictures Productions; Warner Horizon Television

Original release
- Network: The CW
- Release: September 23, 2007 – February 24, 2008

Related
- Extra

CW Now is an American news program/news magazine series which aired on The CW from September 23, 2007 to February 24, 2008. It was a brand extension of the syndicated Telepictures news magazine Extra, and featured anchors and correspondents from that show, including co-hosts Mario Lopez and Tanika Ray. The program was devoted to topics of interest to young adults (ages 18–29, the audience targeted by the network), including entertainment news and technology topics, sometimes drawn from Extra itself, setting up the latter to inexplicably compete with its own weekend edition.

== Show description and advertising concept ==
During The CW's first upfront presentation, network executive Dawn Ostroff announced to advertisers that they would pursue a then-new advertising strategy for the series (resembling the current day concept of native advertising combined with an advertorial), which the network called "CWickies" (pronounced quickies). Under the concept, an advertiser's content would be blended into the program rather than the show taking traditional commercial breaks, allowing the show to make the incorrect claim that it would be "commercial-free" in the traditional sense.

Only Walmart would truly take advantage of the format with their products blended into every episode of CW Now, and comedian Lewis Black mocked the concept in a "Back in Black" monologue on The Daily Show's September 26, 2007 episode. The "CWickies" concept would also be tried for the commercial breaks between Gilmore Girls and Veronica Mars on Tuesday evenings in a more traditional ad format (this time tying in with American Eagle Outfitters's aerie underwear brand), where it also failed to attract interest due to the target audience of each series finding the conversations between actors in "CWickies" ads about aerie and the plot points in those two series unnatural and stilted.

The show was produced by Telepictures and Warner Horizon Television.

== Reception ==
On the January 20, 2008 episode, CW Now received a 0.2/0 in the 18–49 demo, earning what was then a rare broadcast network "scratch" Nielsen rating where too few ratings participants were watching to allow any tabulation, with the following repeat of Aliens in America attaining the lowest-possible 0.1/0. Against Super Bowl XLII on Fox on February 3, 2008, the show indeed hit that same number with a 0.1/0 in the 18–49 demo, a 0.3/0 in the households, and only 349,000 viewers.

== Cancellation ==
On February 8, 2008, The CW announced that CW Now would be going on hiatus, though only five days later, it was announced that the February 24, 2008 episode would be the series finale. The show was replaced with encores of America's Next Top Model.
