= The Accidental Cheerleader =

2007 book by Mimi McCoy

- Author: Mimi McCoy
- Language: English
- Series: Candy Apple Books
- Subject: Friendship, Middle School
- Genre: Realistic Fiction
- Publisher: Scholastic Inc.
- Publication date: January 1, 2007
- Publication place: United States
- Media type: Paperback
- Pages: 176
- ISBN: 978-0-439-92928-8

The Accidental Cheerleader is a realistic fiction book written by Mimi McCoy. It was published by Scholastic Inc. on January 1, 2007, and is a Candy Apple Book.

== Plot ==
Kylie Lovett and Sophie Smith have been best friends since they were babies. Before they begin seventh grade at Meridian Middle School, the girls go shopping for outfits to wear on the first day of school. They both end up buying matching jeans that have an embroidered red dragon crawling down the left leg. However, Kylie soon decides that it wouldn't be cool to be all "matchy-matchy", so it's only fair that neither of them wear it.

On the first day, Sophie wears lime green corduroys to keep her promise, but feels hurt when Kylie shows up wearing the dragon jeans. Realizing her mistake, Kylie immediately apologizes and explains how she was in such a hurry that she forgot about the compromise. The two friends then meet up with Joel Leo, Kylie's neighbor and family friend, and Sophie develops a crush on him.

While taking the bus home after school, Kylie tells Sophie that she signed them both up for cheer-leading tryouts. Although Sophie is not enthusiastic about the idea, Joel encourages her to participate as he knows that she is a great gymnast. After practicing their routine many times, the girls finally attend the tryouts, and Kylie ends up making a fool out of herself in-front of everyone. When the list is posted the other day, Sophie is happy that she made the team but Kylie is selected to be the team's mascot, which happens to be a mule.

During cheer-leading practices, Sophie slowly becomes a part of the "cool crowd", which consists of Queen Bee Keisha Reyes (who calls Sophie "Bitsy"), her best friend Courtney Knox, and Amie and Marie Gildencrest; all of whom were cheerleaders, too. When Keisha hosts a party at her house, Sophie is invited while Kylie isn't, but Sophie persuades Kylie and Joel to attend. Just minutes after arriving, Kylie and Joel decide to leave as they find the party boring, but Sophie harshly refuses to go with them and stays. She ends up talking to Scott Hersh, Kylie's crush, but doesn't know that Scott is Keisha's ex-boyfriend. At the Halloween Ball, Sophie is ignored by both the cool crowd and Kylie & Joel after Sophie dances with Scott.

Sophie decides to apologize to Kylie, but is furious when Kylie makes fun of the cheer-leaders at a school game. This leads to Kylie's suspension from the squad, and a new mascot is brought in. But the new mascot is not as good at his job, and the school team is about to lose the game. Sophie comes up with an emergency plan, and after a quick discussion, the squad decides to bring Kylie back. The Mules end up winning the game, and Kylie & Sophie make up. Kylie then reveals that Joel likes Sophie, and Sophie tells her that she likes him back.

== Reception ==
Publishers Weekly found it offered a convincing portrayal of middle school, with its pressures to be popular, despite the occasional contrivance. Go.com found it had a bit more substance than the title suggests, despite an emphasis on consumerism; although aimed at tweens it is suitable for age 8 and up. Common Sense Media wrote "Easy read on fitting in not worth cheering about." and "this book (is) not totally inappropriate for younger readers, but a much better fit for kids facing similar issues, readers 11+."
