= Dear Genevieve =

- Genre: Reality, Home improvement
- Starring: Genevieve Gorder
- Country of origin: United States
- Original language: English
- No. of seasons: 6

Production
- Running time: 30 minutes
- Production company: Leopard Films

Original release
- Network: HGTV
- Release: January 1, 2009 – December 18, 2012

Dear Genevieve is a television show on the American cable network HGTV, hosted by Genevieve Gorder.

The series debuted in January 2009, on HGTV. The show focuses on how Gorder designs a room or an area for a family after they have written to the show asking for help.

== Episodes ==
=== Season 1 ===
#	Title	Airdate
01	"A Functional Design and Zoning Plan in a Great Room"	January 1, 2009
02	"A Dark and Dingy Basement Is Given New Life"	January 8, 2009
03	"A Living Room Fit for the Whole Family"	February 9, 2009
04	"A Modern Tuscan-Inspired Kitchen"	January 1, 2009
05	"A Tiny Home Office That Utilizes Every Inch of Space"	January 12, 2009
06	"Espositos' Basement"	February 9, 2009
07	"Modern Style for a Home Full of Old Furniture"	January 19, 2009
08	"A Romantic Bedroom for Newlyweds"	January 26, 2009
09	"Polishing Up Her Parents' Home"	January 5, 2009
10	"Kitchen Makeover on a Budget"	February 2, 2009
11	"Turning a Dated Living Room Into a Space That Reflects the Owners' Personalities"	March 2, 2009
12	"A Boring Backyard Is Transformed Into a Zen Retreat"	March 9, 2009
13	"A Country Kitchen Is Updated with Modern Functionality"	February 23, 2009

=== Season 2 ===
#	Title	Airdate
01	"Bringing Modern Style to a Former Bachelor's Great Room"	April 6, 2009
02	"A New Nursery Room"	April 13, 2009
03	"Adding Functionality to a High Traffic Family Room"	April 20, 2009
04	"Giving a Dining Room a More Formal Touch"	April 27, 2009
05	"Adding Comfort and Style in a Living Room"	May 16, 2009
06	"Eco-friendly Kitchen"	May 23, 2009
07	"A Disco Era Kitchen Gets a Contemporary Update"	May 30, 2009
08	"A Contemporary Family Room Makeover"	June 6, 2009
09		June 13, 2009
10	"Contemporary Living Room"	July 11, 2009
11	"Relaxing Master Suite Retreat"	May 9, 2009
12	???	???
13	"Renovation Surprise"	June 6, 2009

=== Season 3 ===
#	Title	Airdate
01	"Converting a Nightmare Kitchen for a Young Couple"	March 20, 2010
02	"Creating A Family Room Out Of A Dark Basement"	March 27, 2010
03	"Finding the Front Door"	April 3, 2010
04	"Designer Genevieve Gorder is Called Upon to Help Redesign a Playroom Into Both an Adult and a Child Friendly Space"	April 17, 2010
05	"A Tiny Kitchen Gets an Update While Maintaining the Charm and Character"	April 24, 2010
06	"A Prized Victorian Mantelpiece Is Incorporated Into A Living Room Update"	May 1, 2010
07	"A Basement Is Transformed Into a Room the Whole Family Will Love and Use"	May 8, 2010
08	"Creating a Multi-Purpose Romantic Bedroom"	May 15, 2010
09	"A Galley Kitchen Gets a Modern Cottage Makeover"	May 22, 2010
10	"Designer Genevieve Gorder Updates A Small Family Bathroom In A Newlyweds' Home"	May 29, 2010
11	"A Bedroom Becomes an Oasis"	June 5, 2010
12	"Battling Styles Combined in Living Room"	June 12, 2010
13	"A Cluttered Nursery Gets Totally Reimagined"	June 19, 2010
14	"Finding the Front Door"	June 26, 2010

=== Season 4 ===
#	Title	Airdate
01	"Tom and Angelica's Living Room"	January 10, 2011
02	"Trevor and Gerthy's Bathroom"	January 16, 2011
03	"Hagop and Claudia's Playroom"	January 23, 2011
04	"Mark and Nellie's Living Room"	January 30, 2011
05	"Christina's Living Room"	February 6, 2011
06	"A Home Office for Two"	February 13, 2011
07	"Making a Small Kitchen Big"	February 20, 2011
08	"Visual Cues for Room Flow"	February 27, 2011
09	"An Urban Retreat"	March 6, 2011
10	"Casual Chic, Everyday Dining"	March 13, 2011
11	"Crash Pad to Pied-A-Terre"	March 27, 2011

== See also ==
- HGTV Design Star
