= Cathy Hobbs =

American interior designer

Cathy Hobbs (born c. 1970) is an American broadcaster and interior designer. She worked as a news reporter for over 20 years at local stations around the United States. After studying interior design, she opened her own firm and went on to host a number of interior design television shows as well as appearing, in 2011, as a contestant on the 6th season of HGTV Design Star.

== Early life and education ==
Hobbs was born about 1970. She grew up in Columbia, Maryland, and Bloomfield Hills, Michigan, and attended the University of Southern California (USC).

== Career ==
Hobbs began a career in broadcasting at KGET-TV in Bakersfield, California, while she was still at university. In 1991, she joined WOLO-TV in Columbia, South Carolina, as its featured night-beat reporter. She moved to WSMV-TV in Nashville, Tennessee. She then worked for WRC-TV, the Washington D.C. NBC station, for 3 years, before joined WPIX in April 1997.

Hobbs worked as a news reporter for WPIX 19 years. While there, she began studying at the Fashion Institute of Technology and later opened an interior design firm in New York City.

In 2009, Hobbs left the WPIX news team to launch a real estate and design television series, Metro Residential as co-host and executive producer of the program. In January 2014, she also launched Design Recipes, a real estate and design series also as host and executive producer and owner.

In 2011, she became a contestant on HGTV Design Star one of 12 finalists for Season 6, with the prize for the winner being their own show. Hobbs writes a nationally-syndicated weekly series called Design Recipes. She is also one of the designers on HGTV Canada's show Top 10.

== Personal life ==
Hobbs is married with children and lives in Brooklyn.

== Awards ==
Hobbs has been nominated for 19 Emmy Awards and is a five-time Emmy award winner, including:

- 2002 New York Emmy Award for Get Out Alive
- 2003 New York Emmy Award for Outstanding On-Camera Achievement in General Assignment and Live Reporting.

In 2025, Hobbs was given the Entrepreneur of the Year award by the Chamber of Commerce in Ulster County, New York.
