= Town Haul =

- Presented by: Genevieve Gorder

Original release
- Network: TLC

Town Haul is a television program on TLC, hosted by Genevieve Gorder. Each season featured a series of episodes focussed on an old, small town, to give them a new look. Season 1 featured Jeffersonville, New York, season two covered Laurens, South Carolina. The first two seasons typically provided a make-over family-run businesses. In the third season, set in the town of Washington, Missouri, the first rebuild was of a house, but the second was of a historic, family owned business known for its mile high pies.

== Episodes ==
Season	Episodes	Originally released	
Season	Episodes	First released	Last released
1	6	January 22, 2005	February 26, 2005
2	6	March 5, 2005	April 9, 2005
3	6	August 20, 2005	September 24, 2005
