= Design on a Dime =

- Genre: Reality, Home improvement
- Country of origin: United States
- Original language: English

Production
- Running time: 30 minutes

Original release
- Network: HGTV
- Release: 2003 – 2013

Design on a Dime is a decorating television series that aired on HGTV from 2003 to 2013. In this long-running series, a design team demonstrates how problem areas can be revitalized on a budget of only $1,000. The show was based in Chicago, IL. and featured a rotation of design teams and hosts. Later episodes featured designer Casey Noble (a season five Design Star contestant) using innovative solutions to the toughest makeover scenarios and with a bigger budget of $2,500. There were a few variations, including episodes highlighting a $3,000 wedding, Christmas, a special "Etsy" episode, and more.

== Hosts ==
- Casey Noble (2011-2013): Noble began her design career as a computer graphic artist in Washington, D.C., before moving to California to study interior design at The Fashion Institute of Design & Merchandising. In 2009, Noble founded her own design firm with two colleagues. She competed in season five of HGTV's Design Star, finishing in the top three.
- Kahi Lee: Lee started her HGTV career hosting the series Freestyle (2005–07). She joined Design on a Dime in 2007. She also works as an interior designer in Los Angeles.
- Sam Kivett
- Frank Fontana: Fontana won The Great Domestic Showdown, a reality television show on ABC, in 2004. He joined Design on a Dime in 2007 and worked primarily with Kelly Edwards and Ali Azhar.
- Lee Snijders: Lee was the second host and lead designer on Design on a Dime. In 1990, Snijders created Lee Snijders Designs, which encompassed his love of interior and furniture design. He worked for five years with Walt Disney Imagineering before switching to HGTV, where he competed and won two episodes of Designers Challenge, ultimately becoming the host and lead designer for HGTV's Design on a Dime from 2001 to 2009. In 2018, Lee retired to Las Vegas, Nevada, where he operates his business "Breech Gear".
- Kristan Cunningham: Cunningham studied interior design at the University of Charleston, followed by moving to Los Angeles to work in high-end furniture showrooms. She published the book Design on a Dime: Achieve High Style on a $1000 Budget in 2003 and Six Steps to Design on a Dime. Cunningham hosted the first 10 seasons of the show, beginning in 2003. She left HGTV in 2011 after filming more than 150 episodes.

== Design team ==
- Spencer Anderson: Anderson grew up in Houston, Texas, where he studied art and metal sculpture. He later moved to Los Angeles, where he began assistant art directing on small cable films.
- Ali Azhar: As a contractor, Azhar handles lighting, building, and tiling, among other things.
- Summer Baltzer: Baltzer began her career designing and decorating for community and equity theater productions in the Southern California area, while also running her own residential interior design business. She received her formal training at California State University-Northridge in the Family Environmental Sciences department, where she studied architectural and interior design.
- Charles Burbridge: Burbridge had a decorative painting and interiors business in Los Angeles.
- Kelly Edwards: Edwards was born in Chicago. After working for three years in Los Angeles as the design assistant for one of the original Design on a Dime design teams, she returned to her hometown.
- Abraham Hopkins: Hopkins' approach is to bring green homes and eco-developments to the public. Hopkins is the owner of Paradigm Building, a construction company specializing in green building. Before, he worked for 10 years as a carpenter. He received a bachelor's degree in construction management from Cal Poly. He went on to earn his contractor's license following that, and with five years of experience, he was certified as a Green Builder.
- David Sheinkopf: Sheinkopf grew up in New York City. After years of acting, he began building and designing, focusing on set design and art direction on music videos and commercials.

== Seasons ==
Design on a Dime started airing in 2003, producing a total of 31 seasons.
