= Color Splash =

- Genre: Reality; home improvement
- Starring: David Bromstad
- Country of origin: United States
- Original language: English
- No. of seasons: 8

Production
- Production locations: San Francisco (2007–2010); Miami (2010–2012)
- Running time: 30 minutes

Original release
- Network: HGTV
- Release: March 19, 2007 – March 17, 2012

Color Splash is a reality television show on American cable network HGTV, hosted by David Bromstad, that was broadcast from 2007 through 2012.

The series was created for Bromstad after winning season one of HGTV Design Star. It debuted March 19, 2007 on HGTV. The show focuses on transforming rooms by dramatic uses of color. The show also features color specialist and carpenter Danielle Hirsch, who debuted on HGTV's Design Remix starring Karen McAloon.

Color Splash relocated from San Francisco to Miami in 2010.
