= Matchy-matchy =

Adjective

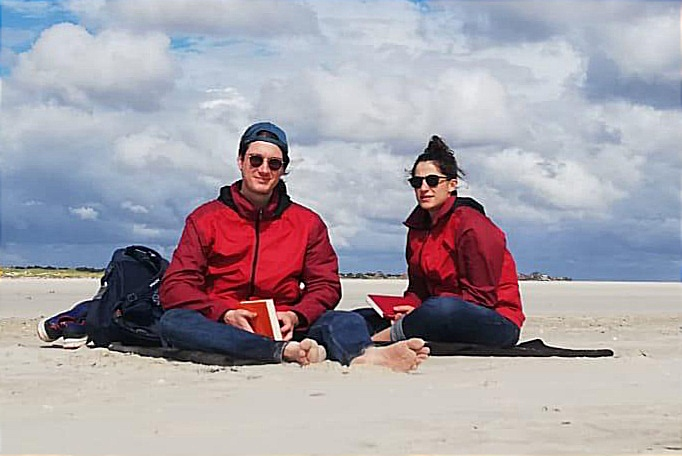
A heterosexual couple in matching outfits

Matchy-matchy is an adjective used to describe something or someone that is very or excessively color-coordinated. It is a term that is commonly used in fashion blogs to describe an outfit that is too coordinated and consists of too many of the same styles of colors, patterns, fabrics, accessories, etc. "Matchy-matchy" was added to the Oxford Dictionary of English in 2010 along with 200 new words that were previously considered as slang.

According to some designers, matching too much is not a good thing. "Sometimes fashion has to reintroduce an idea that may have once been considered a bad taste," says Jane Shepherdson.

== Use in pop culture ==
- Mentioned in the children's book The Accidental Cheerleader
