= Tanika Ray =

American actress

- Born: Washington, D.C., U.S.
- Occupations: Entertainment reporter and actress
- Years active: 1993–present

Tanika Ray is an American entertainment reporter and actress. She was born in Washington, D.C., and raised in Los Angeles, California. Tanika Ray is a pop culture & lifestyle specialist with a holistic view of the cross-sections of culture.

== Career ==
Ray began her career as a professional dancer with various artists such as Will Smith, the Backstreet Boys, Peter Andre, Brandy Norwood and late singer Aaliyah. She then started acting, guest starring in shows like The Wayans Bros., Living Single, NYPD Blue and Family Matters She also appeared on music oriented shows such as Soul Train, Motown Live and the short-lived late night talk show based on Vibe.

She appeared as a motion capture character, providing the voice and body movements of "Cyber Lucy", the animated hostess for the children's version of Wheel of Fortune, Wheel of Fortune 2000. During this period, she was also the official voice of CBS Saturday Mornings. She then hosted various TV shows including Robotica co-hosted by Ahmet Zappa for TLC and Lifetime Now with Linda Dano for Lifetime TV. After multiple seasons of Lifetime Now, Ray hosted another show on Lifetime called Head2Toe.

In 2004, Ray became a New York correspondent for the entertainment magazine show Extra. After two years she was promoted to the host of its weekend edition Extra's Weekend Show and relocated to Los Angeles. In 2009 she left Extra. Ray next hosted TBS Weekend Extra on TBS and CWNOW on the CW. After leaving, she hosted For the Love of Ray J. 2 Reunion Special for VH1, a one-hour special on the movie Precious for TV Guide Network, and TV Guide's Oscar Pre-Show On the Red Carpet and a one-hour special on Sex and the City 2.

She frequently appears as a guest panelist on Showbiz Tonight on HLN (TV channel) and programs on CNN, MSNBC and Fox News Channel. She also hosted season seven of HGTV's Design Star.

In 2017, Tanika Ray rejoined Extra, and left for good two years later.

== Television ==
- Wheel of Fortune 2000 (1997–1998) as Cyber Lucy, the Hostess
- Soap Center (2000–2004)
- Robotica (2001)
- Speaking of Women's Health (2001)
- Head 2 Toe (2003–2005)
- Extra (2004–2009, 2017–2019)
- TBS Weekend Extra (since 2005)
- Seacrest @ Night Pilot
- Soap News Update
- CW Now (2007–2008)
- HSN Trendsetter (2008–present) Host
- Basketball Wives (2010) Reunion Host
- HGTV'D (2011–present) Host
- HGTV Design Star (2011) Host
- Oh Sit (2012–2013) Co-Host

== Guest starring ==
- Living Single (1996)
- Lois & Clark: The New Adventures of Superman (1996)
- Friends (1997) (un-credited role)
- The Wayans Bros. (1998)
- Family Matters (1998)
- Hyperion Bay (1999)
- All My Children (2006)
