= Tiffany Brooks (designer) =

American interior designer

Tiffany (Moulton) Brooks (born June 17, 1979) is an American interior designer and television personality. In 2013, she was crowned the winner of the competition show HGTV Design Star.

== Early and personal life ==
Brooks is the youngest of three children born to Callie Guins and Michael Moulton Sr. in Waukegan, IL. She has two older siblings, Michael Moulton Jr. and Karen Moulton. After graduating from North Chicago Community High School, Brooks studied business management and obtained her real estate brokers license in Illinois. After college she immediately began her career as a multifamily residential property manager and staging model homes.

She married her high school boyfriend, Dante Brooks. Since age six, Brooks has battled type 1 diabetes. The disease led to a failed kidney and near-death illness after giving birth in 2003 to their son Ayden. In 2004 she was the recipient of a kidney from her brother and in 2005 a pancreas from a deceased anonymous organ donor. Today, her only son battles with the illness, causing her to be an advocate for the JDRF and its causes.

== Career ==
After losing a bet to a co-worker in 2007, Brooks opened You and Your Decor, a Chicago and Milwaukee-based interior design company.

In 2013 she was cast in Design Star, a televised competition to pick a host for a new show on the HGTV cable network. After seven episodes, Brooks won and began hosting The Most Embarrassing Rooms in America, which lasted just four episodes. During the series, Brooks paired up with DIY Network carpenter Jeff Devlin (I Hate My Bath) to makeover the homes that were selected by the network as most embarrassing.

Brooks and her work has since appeared in Essence, Uptown, Chicago (Interiors) Luxury, and HGTV Magazines. She makes regular appearances and design demonstrations locally in Chicago for WGN, ABC, and WCIU.

She teamed up with designer David Bromstad on the second season of HGTV's Rock the Block. She is the host of HGTV’s $50k Three Ways and the designer/host of HGTV's sweepstakes show, Smart Home,

She made her debut on the 2021 Architectural Digest AD100 list of designers and architects.

Her celebrity design clients include LeBron James.
