= HGTV Design Star season 2 =

This season is the second season of HGTV Design Star. It features 10 designers competing for their own show on HGTV.

== Designers ==
Designer	Age^{1}	Current City	Place
Lisa Millard	25	Bloomsburg, Pennsylvania	11th
Neeraja Lockart	42	Palm Springs, California	10th
Josh "Organic Josh" Foss	25	Minneapolis–Saint Paul	9th
Scott Corridan	37	Santa Barbara, California	8th
Adriana Nussbaumer	36	Orange County, California	7th
Christina Ray	29	Canton, Georgia	6th
Josh "Sparkle Josh" Johnson	32	Hendersonville, Tennessee	5th
Robb Mariani	39	Orlando, Florida	4th
Will Smith	30	Charlotte, North Carolina	3rd
Todd Davis	34	San Francisco, California	2nd
Kim Myles	33	Queens, New York	1st

- The winning Design Star was Kim Myles, who went on to host Myles of Style. Kim and Todd each also won a new Mercury Mariner.
- ^{1} Age at the time of the show's filming

== Contestant progress ==
Place	Contestant	1	2	3	4 ^{1}	5	6	7	Vote	Comments
1	Kim	IN	LOW	IN	IN	IN	IN	IN	WINNER	Winner of Design Star season 2
2	Todd	HIGH	IN	WIN	IN	IN	IN	IN	RUNNER-UP	Elimin: Season 2 Finale
3	Will	HIGH	IN	IN	LOW	LOW	OUT			Elimin: Design Star Gives Back
4	Robb	LOW	LOW	HIGH	WIN	OUT				Elimin: Designing for a Celebrity
5	Josh J.	HIGH	WIN	LOW	OUT					Elimin: I Do—Vegas Style!
6	Christina	IN	IN	HIGH	OUT					Elimin: I Do—Vegas Style!
7	Adriana	IN	IN	OUT						Elimin: .99 Reasons to be Creative
8	Scott	HIGH	IN	OUT						Elimin: .99 Reasons to be Creative
9	Josh F.	LOW	OUT							Elimin: Dueling Kitchens
10	Neeraja	LOW	OUT							Elimin: Dueling Kitchens
11	Lisa	OUT								Elimin: Design a Las Vegas Penthouse

(WINNER) The designer won America's vote and the competition.
(RUNNER-UP) The designer lost America's vote and received second place.
(WIN) The designer was selected as the winner of the episode's Elimination Challenge.
(HIGH) The designer was selected as one of the top entries in the Elimination Challenge, but did not win.
(IN) The designer was not selected as either top entry or bottom entry in the Elimination Challenge, and advanced to the next challenge.
(LOW) The designer was selected as one of the bottom entries in the Elimination Challenge, but was not deemed the worst of the designers who advanced in that particular week.
(LOW) The designer was selected as one of the bottom two entries in the Elimination Challenge, and was deemed the worst of the designers who advanced in that particular week.
(OUT) The designer was eliminated from the competition.
(OUT) The designer was eliminated outside of judging panel.

- ^{1} In the fourth episode, the designer with the worst design in the clients' eyes would be eliminated outside of the judging panel. The worst design was Christina's, and so she was cut.

== Challenges ==
=== Challenge 1: Design a Las Vegas Penthouse ===
The designers have 28 working hours and a $15,000 budget to design the Las Vegas penthouse where they will live during the competition.

- Area designed:
  - Entrance Hall: Lisa
  - Living Room 1: Robb and Josh F.
  - Dining Pit: Kim and Scott
  - Living Room 2: Todd
  - Bar and Stairwell: Neeraja
  - Master bedroom: Will and Josh J.
  - Small Bedroom: Adriana and Christina
- ELIMINATED: Lisa
- First aired: July 29, 2007

=== Challenge 2: Dueling Kitchens ===
The designers divide into two teams and each team has to make over a kitchen.

- Teams:
  - Team 1: Adriana, Josh J., Kim, Neeraja (captain), Scott
  - Team 2: Christina, Josh F. (captain), Robb, Todd, Will
- WINNER: Josh J.
- ELIMINATED: Josh F., Neeraja
- First aired: August 5, 2007

=== Challenge 3: .99 Reasons to Be Creative ===
Each designer has a budget of $399 to decorate an empty room using items purchased at a 99-cent store.

- WINNER: Todd
- ELIMINATED: Scott, Adriana
- First aired: August 12, 2007

=== Challenge 4: I Do--Vegas Style! ===
The designers have to design a wedding reception for 75 guests. After the designs are submitted, the couple will choose their favorite and least favorite designs. The designer of the least favorite will be eliminated. The remaining five will have sixteen hours to put everything together before the reception begins.

- WINNING DESIGN (lead designer for the challenge): Robb
- ELIMINATED: Christina (least favorite design), Josh J.
- First aired: August 19, 2007

=== Challenge 5: Designing for a Celebrity ===
The remaining four designers have 24 working hours to design a guest house for Wayne Newton and his wife Kat. Then they must each record a presentation of their room to show the judges how they will act on camera.

- Teams:
  - Kitchen: Kim, Robb
  - Living room: Todd, Will
- ELIMINATED: Robb
- First aired: August 26, 2007

=== Challenge 6: Design Star Gives Back ===
The three remaining designers are each randomly assigned to a deserving family chosen by HGTV to receive a $10,000 makeover of any room. Again, each must present the finished room to the judges, who will judge both the design and hosting ability. One will be eliminated, and the remaining two move on to the final challenge and the nationwide vote for the next Design Star.

- Placement:
  - Bridget & Parents: Will
  - Dean Family: Kim
  - Kelley Family: Todd
- ELIMINATED: Will
- First aired: September 2, 2007

=== Challenge 7: Island Dreams ===
The final two designers each have a $10,000 budget to make over a hotel suite in Hawaii. Some of the eliminated contestants return to help them out. The final Design Star will be chosen from the viewers' voting.

- First aired: September 9, 2007

=== Season 2 finale ===
Kim is revealed as the viewers' choice for the next Design Star.

- ELIMINATED: Todd
- First aired: September 16, 2007
