= Jennifer Bertrand =

American television personality

Jennifer Bertrand is the host of Home & Garden Television's Paint-Over! with Jennifer Bertrand and the season three champion of HGTV Design Star. Paint-Over! with Jennifer Bertrand is an hour-long show that showcases her decorative painting and murals. She will also be on the show HGTV Showdown, in which she will compete head-to-head with another HGTV designer. In addition to appearances and a hosting job on HGTV, Bertrand owns a design business with her husband in Weatherby Lake, Missouri.
