= Karen McAloon =

- Born: August 16, 1968 (age 57); Redondo Beach, California
- Occupation: TV presenter
- Employer: HGTV

Karen McAloon (born August 16, 1968) is the designer/host on the television show Find Your Style on HGTV (seasons 1 & 2: 2007; season 3: 2008), and the designer/host of HGTV's Design Remix that ran from 2005-2007 (7 season, 91 episodes). Karen began on the HGTV Network as a guest landscape designer on five episodes of Landscape Smart in 2004/05. She also designed and hosted six one-hour specials for HGTV, and was a host of the HGTV 2007 Tournament Of Roses Parade live broadcast.

== Biography ==
McAloon was born and raised in Redondo Beach, a neighborhood just outside Los Angeles. She attended South Torrance High and was on the Student Council, French Club, and several other highly important bodies of legislature.

After taking some time off to travel, McAloon premiered a new show, Find Your Style. With the motto "Anyone can be a designer," she teaches homeowners how to redesign their own rooms based on four elements of style that they choose. On Find Your Style, McAloon works with Emily Hastings, Joe Macaluso, and Mikel Hubbard (main producer). She is an extensive traveler and spent nearly two years traveling throughout Australia, Southeast Asia, India, China and Nepal.
