= Candice Tells All =

Canadian TV series

- Starring: Candice Olson
- Country of origin: Canada
- Original language: English

Production
- Running time: 30 minutes

Original release
- Network: W Network
- Release: January 6, 2011 – 2013

Candice Tells All is a Canadian interior design show that aired on the W Network featuring designer Candice Olson.
