= Candice Olson =

Canadian interior designer

- Born: Candice Kelly Olson; October 27, 1964 (age 61)
- Education: Bachelor's degree of Science and Interior Designs
- Alma mater: University of Calgary; Ryerson University (now Toronto Metropolitan University)
- Years active: 1994-present
- Television: Divine Design, Candice Tells All
- Spouse: Jurij Sennecke
- Children: 2, including Beckett Sennecke

Candice Olson (born October 27, 1964) is a Canadian designer. She was the host of the Toronto-based home-makeover shows Divine Design and Candice Tells All, which aired on the W Network in Canada and on HGTV in the United States.

== Early life ==
Olson attended the University of Calgary and played for the Canadian national volleyball team at the same time. She then transferred and graduated from the School of Interior Design at Ryerson University in Toronto.

Olson honed her skills for several years in several of Canada's top interior design firms.

== Career ==
=== Candice Olson Design ===
In 1994, she established her own residential and commercial design practice, Candice Olson Design, based in Metro Toronto, Ontario, Canada.

=== Television ===
In the fall of 2001, Divine Design debuted on Canada's W Network and quickly established itself as one of the network's flagship shows. Two years later, in 2003, the series premiered on HGTV in the United States in more than 90 million homes.

On January 1, 2011, Olson's new series, Candice Tells All, premiered on HGTV. It debuted on the W Network in Canada on January 6, 2011.

=== Collection ===
The Candice Olson Collection is made up of products in the home décor market. The lines include an upholstered furniture line for Norwalk (MyCandiceDesign.com), The Furniture Idea; a line of fabric from Kravet Inc.; a lighting line; a line of rugs for Surya (surya.com); bettertrends a line of broad case good, occasional, and table line with Revco International; and a wallpaper line for York Wallcoverings (http://www.yorkwallcoverings.com)

=== Books ===
In 2006, Olson wrote her first book; Candice Olson on Design: Inspiration and Ideas for Your Home in which she shares design secrets, smart tips, and practical advice to help readers plan and execute successful room makeovers.

Her second book, Candice Olson: Kitchen & Bathrooms was published on March 22, 2011.

== Personal life ==
Olson married custom house builder Jurij Sennecke in 2002. They have two children, Pyper and Beckett, the latter of whom was drafted third overall in the 2024 NHL entry draft by the Anaheim Ducks. Both of her pregnancies were discussed on various episodes of Divine Design during the second and fourth seasons.
