= Genevieve Gorder =

American television host and interior designer

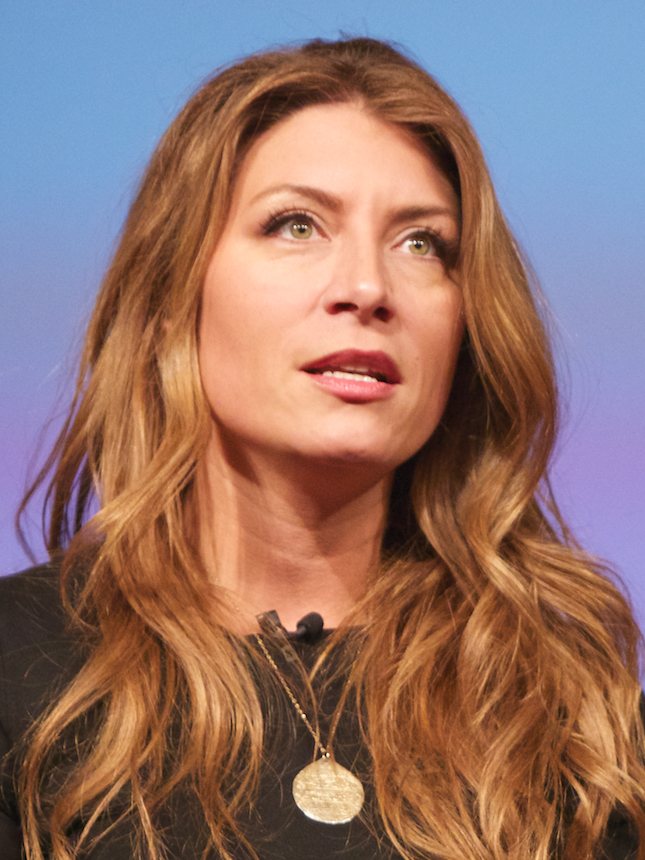
- Gorder in 2014
- Born: July 26, 1974 (age 51); Minneapolis, Minnesota
- Spouses: Christian Dunbar (m. 2018) Tyler Harcott (m. 2006; div. 2013)
- Children: 1

Genevieve Gorder (born July 26, 1974) is an American television host and interior designer. She was one of the Designers on Trading Spaces, She hosted Bravo's Best Room Wins. Previously, she hosted Stay Here on Netflix, Genevieve's Renovation, "White House Christmas," and Dear Genevieve on HGTV and judged HGTV's Design Star.

== Early life ==
Gorder is the oldest of three children and the only daughter. Her mother is Diana Drake, and her father is Jon Gorder. She attended Minneapolis South High School, where she played soccer and the violin. From 1992 to 1994, Gorder attended Lewis & Clark College in Portland, Oregon, majoring in international affairs, but decided to change her career path after taking a graphic design course. In 1994, she obtained an internship at MTV in New York City. After completing the internship, MTV offered Gorder a permanent job, which she accepted. She permanently relocated to New York and graduated with a B.F.A. in design from the School of Visual Arts in Manhattan.

== Personal life ==
From 2006 to 2013, Gorder was married to Canadian actor Tyler Harcott, with whom she has a daughter, Bebelle.

In September 2018, Gorder married Christian Dunbar, an interior designer and furniture builder.

== Career ==
Before being known as a designer, Gorder appeared as a commentator on the MTV series Sex in the 90s.

During her tenure at design company Duffy & Partners (now Duffy) in New York City from 1998 to 2000, Gorder designed the bottle for Tanqueray No. 10 gin.

=== Trading Spaces ===
Gorder was one of the original designers on TLC's hit series Trading Spaces, which premiered in 2000. Gorder appeared in Seasons 1-4, 6, and 9. She gained recognition from the show and quickly became known for her soulful designs and her habit of working barefoot. She parodied her lack of footwear in a series of Swiffer sweeper commercials that started running on television and in periodicals in 2003.

In addition to her role on Trading Spaces, Gorder was a designer for a spinoff show, Trading Spaces: Family.

=== Town Haul ===
In 2005, Gorder made-over several small American towns for TLC's Town Haul, which she also hosted.

=== Dear Genevieve ===
Gorder's next onscreen project, Dear Genevieve, premiered on HGTV in January 2009 and ran for 78 episodes. The show featured Gorder solving design problems, in-person, for people who had emailed the program seeking her advice.

=== Design Star ===
Gorder was one of three judges on the design panel of HGTV Design Star (renamed HGTVStar in 2013). The show featured Gorder advising and critiquing designers looking to achieve status on television. She appeared in 25 episodes of HGTV Design Star between 2009 and 2012.

=== HGTV White House Christmas ===
Gorder hosted HGTV's White House Christmas in 2015. In this special, Gorder gave viewers a tour of the Christmas decorations at the White House in Washington, D.C.

=== Genevieve's Renovation ===
Gorder starred in this show about the renovation of her own life and apartment in Manhattan. It premiered in July 2014 and ran for six episodes. The series was a personal look at what it is to be a designer and a reverse client as she designs for herself and her daughter.

=== Stay Here ===
On August 17, 2018, Stay Here launched on Netflix. This eight-episode series featured Gorder and real-estate expert Peter Lorimer working together to help Airbnb and Vrbo hosts redecorate and market their rental properties. Gorder is also credited as an executive producer for the series.

=== Best Room Wins ===
Gorder hosted Bravo's Best Room Wins, a room-makeover competition series that premiered in May 2019. Each of the show's ten episodes featured two interior designers competing for a feature on ELLE Decor's website.

=== Other projects ===
Gorder has designed for brands including Crate & Barrel and Scotties Tissues, and she has served as a spokesperson for General Mills's Box Tops program and Fiber One. She also does infomercials on the ABC channels for America's Steals And Deals.
