= Vern Yip =

American television personality (born 1968)

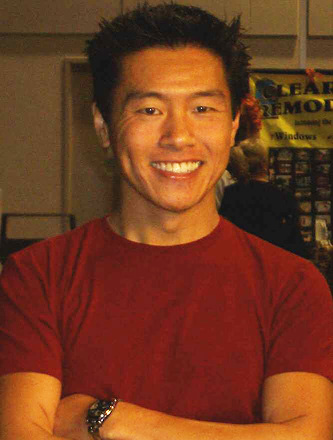
- Yip in 2004
- Born: June 27, 1968 (age 58); Hong Kong
- Education: University of Virginia (B.A. Economics, B.S. Chemistry); Georgia Tech (M.B.A., M. Arch)
- Occupations: TV host and interior designer
- Partner: Craig Koch
- Children: Gavin Joshua Mannox; Vera Lillian Beatrix
- Website: www.vernyip.com

Vern Yip (born June 27, 1968, in Hong Kong) is an American interior designer based in Atlanta, Georgia. He periodically appeared on TLC's Trading Spaces through its fourth season, and was known for frequently including silk, candles and flowers in the rooms he designed. He is one of the panel of judges on HGTV's Design Star. Yip hosted four seasons of HGTV's show Deserving Design. Yip hosted an HGTV special called Urban Oasis, in which he designed a Chicago loft in the Trump International Hotel.

== Early life ==
Yip went to high school in northern Virginia at McLean High School in the class of 1986. Yip double-majored in Chemistry and Economics at his alma mater, the University of Virginia, and later received a masters in management and architecture from the Georgia Institute of Technology. Although he considered opening a design firm in Atlanta, Georgia, Yip says he is happy in his television roles "transforming lives through design".

== Personal life ==
Yip and his partner, Craig Koch, have a son who was born in 2010. The couple's second child, a girl, was born in 2011.
