= David Bromstad =

American designer and television personality (born 1973)

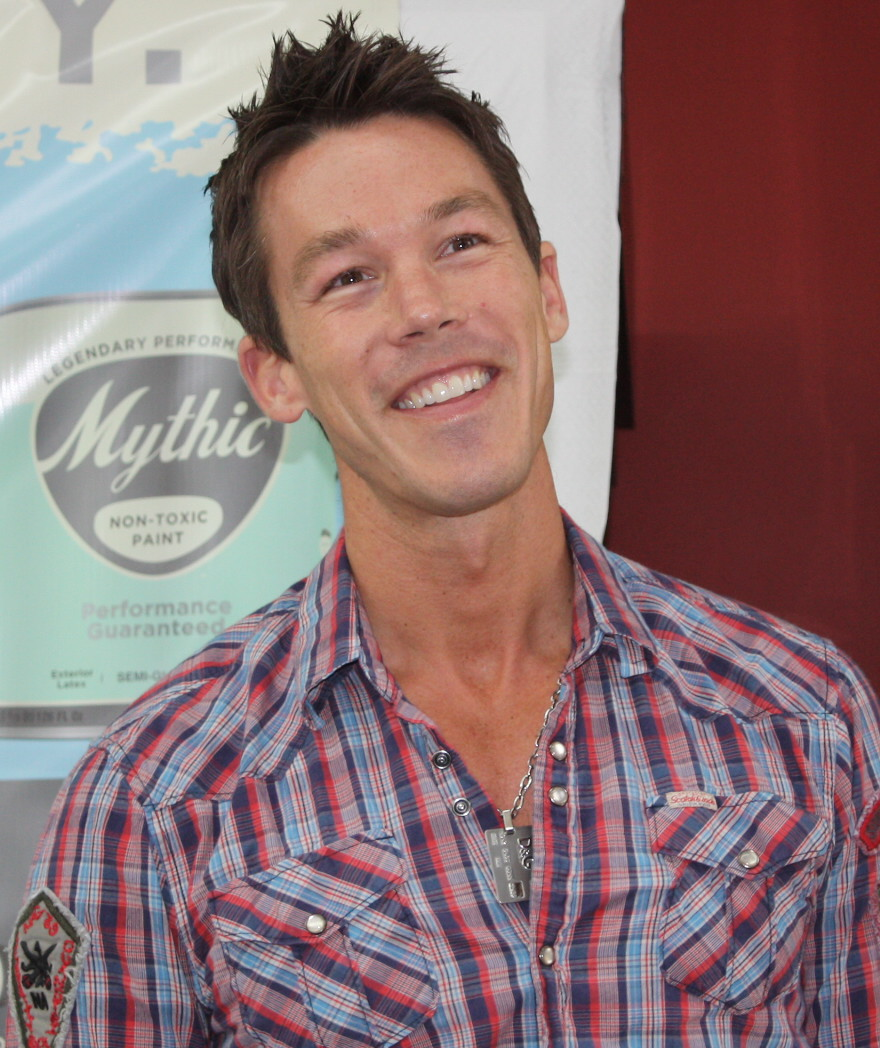
- Bromstad in 2010
- Born: August 17, 1973 (age 52); Cokato, Minnesota, US
- Education: Ringling College of Art and Design, Sarasota, Florida
- Occupations: Interior designer; TV personality
- Known for: Winner of season one of HGTV Design Star, host of Color Splash and My Lottery Dream Home
- Height: 6 ft 1 in (185 cm)
- Parent(s): Richard Harold David Bromstad, Diane Marlys Bromstad

David Reed Bromstad (born August 17, 1973) is an American designer and television personality. In 2006, he became the winner of the debut season of HGTV Design Star. He has hosted a number of HGTV shows, including Color Splash, Beach Flip and My Lottery Dream Home.

== Early life and education ==
Bromstad was born the youngest of four children to Diane Marlys Bromstad (née Krueger) and Richard Harold David Bromstad in Cokato, Minnesota. His mother is of Swedish and German descent, and his father is of Norwegian descent. His siblings are Richard Bromstad, Dynelle Renee Bromstad and Dyonne Rachael Bromstad. He was always interested in art and design, and while attending Wayzata High School made a decision to pursue a career as a Disney animator. He attended the Ringling College of Art and Design in Sarasota, Florida, a school known as a starting point for careers with Disney. After graduating, he worked as a Disney illustrator.

== Career ==
At the urging of a friend, Bromstad moved to Miami Beach and tried out for HGTV's Design Star, a reality show competition to pick a host for a new show on the HGTV cable network. On Design Star, Bromstad competed against nine other potential designers, winning the grand prize – a car, and the chance to host his own show on HGTV. He hosted Color Splash on HGTV from 2007 to 2012.

Bromstad was a guest on the second season of HGTV Design Star, appearing as a guest judge in the first episode and as moral support to the finalists in "Challenge 7: Island Dreams". He was a mentor from Season 6, and host from Season 7.

In 2012, he hosted Design Star All-Stars. He appeared on HGTV's Design at Your Door and was a competitor in the second season of Rock the Block, partnered with designer Tiffany Brooks. He has also appeared on HGTV'd, HGTV Showdown, and Bang for Your Buck.

In 2015, Bromstad began hosting My Lottery Dream Home.

== Personal life ==
Bromstad is gay.

He owns a home in Orlando, Florida, which was featured on My Lottery Dream Home: David's Dream Home.

He has a "tattoo addiction" and favors designs that speak to his love of family, color, gay pride, and Disney.

He was the first HGTV personality to be named to Out magazine's Out100 list of prominent LGBTQ people.

== Filmography ==
- Design Star (2006, 2011-2013) - Winner of Season 1, guest on Season 6, host of Seasons 7 and 8
- Color Splash (2007-2012) - Host, All episodes
- Brother vs. Brother (2011–2017) – Celebrity judge during Seasons 3 and 4
- My Lottery Dream Home (2015–present) - Host, All episodes
- Extreme Makeover: Home Edition (2020) - Guest on Season 1, Episode 3
