= Kia Steave-Dickerson =

American interior designer and television personality

- Born: Philadelphia, Pennsylvania
- Education: Philadelphia College of Textiles & Science
- Occupations: Interior decorator; property master; set decorator; scenic artist
- Known for: Trading Spaces

Kia Steave-Dickerson is an American interior designer and property master known for her work on the American reality television series, Trading Spaces. Raised in Philadelphia, Pennsylvania, she studied textile management and marketing at the Philadelphia College of Textiles & Science. Steave-Dickerson started K.I.A. Enterprises, which focuses primarily on interior and scenic design and construction. In 1993, she starting working as a set designer and property master on films, commercials, and musical theatre productions, frequently working on M. Night Shyamalan's films.

From 2002 to 2004, she appeared on Trading Spaces as part of a revolving cast of interior designers. While planning and decorating rooms for the participants, Steave-Dickerson said that she created specific themes for each participant. Her designs were criticized by Kim Reed of the Today show and others. After Trading Spaces, Steave-Dickerson hosted the short-lived American reality television series Renovate My Place. The show, which aired from 2005 to 2006, focused on renovations for African-American homeowners. After the 2007 birth of her son, she took a seven-year hiatus from work before returning as a property master for Creed (2015) and the third season of Unbreakable Kimmy Schmidt. A recipient of the NBMBAA-Wells Fargo Entrepreneur Excellence Award, Steave-Dickerson has worked with transitional housing.

== Early life ==
Kia Steave-Dickerson was born and raised in Philadelphia, Pennsylvania. Her father worked with a theatre company, and he was the first African-American member of the local chapter of the International Alliance of Theatrical Stage Employees. As a child, Steave-Dickerson worked with him and learned about scenic design. She became interested in design, and accompanied her father on dumpster diving trips in search of materials. About her youth, Steave-Dickerson said: "My early memories are of the smell of sawdust." She earned a bachelor's degree in textile management and marketing from the Philadelphia College of Textiles & Science. Although Steave-Dickerson had considered a career in dry cleaning (given her interest in clothing), she decided to pursue interior design.

== Career ==
=== 1993–2002: K.I.A. Enterprises and work in entertainment ===
Steave-Dickerson's early designs focused on window decorations and fabrics. After graduating from college, she worked in retail for several years (including at Maen Line Fabrics). After her father's death, Steave-Dickerson used her inheritance to found the design company K.I.A. Enterprises (also known as K.I.A. Design and Construction and K.I.A. Design & Construction Enterprises). The company expanded across the United States and does work in interior and theatrical design and construction. Critics have called Steave-Dickerson's approach simplistic yet bold. According to Jennifer Baldino Bonett of the Philadelphia Business Journal, Steave-Dickerson relied on furniture and fabrics made in Philadelphia for her company's projects. In 1998 and 2003, she received awards from minority businesses in the city for her contributions.

She began her career as a set designer and property master in 1993, working on Men in Black (1997), Beloved (1998), The Sixth Sense (1999) and Signs (2002). A property master's assistant for Beloved, Steave-Dickerson forged a slave collar for the film. As part of the production, the props crew looked for real items used during slavery in the United States to preserve historical accuracy. Steave-Dickerson kept the collar as a reminder of "black women back then and the strength they needed to persevere". She also helped design commercials for Chrysler, Bisquick, and Betty Crocker, as well as for musical-theatre productions such as Grease and Cats. Steave-Dickerson was a set decorator for the 1998 crime drama film, Gunshy, and a scenic artist for the 1998 comedy-drama film Wide Awake. She was an assistant property master for the 2000 films Animal Factory and Unbreakable; the former was her third time working with Indian American film director M. Night Shyamalan. In Unbreakable, Steave-Dickerson appeared as an extra. Shyamalan praised her designs, calling her "the funk diva".

=== 2002–05: Trading Spaces ===
In 2002, Steave-Dickerson first appeared on the American reality television series Trading Spaces as an interior designer; she was added to the program around the same time as fellow designer Edward Walker. She appeared on the show from 2002 to 2004 as part of a rotating cast of designers. Calling herself a "theme queen", Steave-Dickerson based a room makeover on an idea around which she accessorized. The Chicago Tribune's Pamela Sherrod wrote that Steave-Dickerson had a "flair for the dramatic". Steave-Dickerson appeared twice on the show's spin-off, Trading Spaces: Family, and in The Best of Trading Spaces special in 2005. According to E! Online, she left the series voluntarily. In addition to Trading Spaces, she participated in the game show Pyramid in 2004.

Steave-Dickerson's appearances on Trading Spaces were criticized. Kim Reed of Today disliked her work on the series, saying that a bedroom decorated with AstroTurf and artificial foliage resembled a graveyard. Reed called Steave-Dickerson "another homeowner nightmare" similar to two of the show's other designers (Douglas Wilson and Hildi Santo-Tomas), and encouraged its producers to remove her from the series. Carpenter Ty Pennington did not give an opinion of the designer when he was asked about the show's cast.

=== 2005–present: Continued career as property master ===
After Trading Spaces, Steave-Dickerson hosted the short-lived American reality television series Renovate My Place. Airing from 2005 to 2006, it focused on helping African-American homeowners with renovations. Apart from these appearances, Steave-Dickerson has largely avoided television work to focus on her career as a property master.

In 2007, she gave birth to a son and took a seven-year hiatus from her career; although she was approached to help with the props for 30 Rock, she refused the offer to raise her child. On October 8, 2009, Steave-Dickerson received the NBMBAA-Wells Fargo Entrepreneur Excellence Award. As part of the award, K.I.A. Design and Construction Enterprises was given $5,000. Steave-Dickerson returned to work on the 2015 film Creed, and was an assistant property master for the third season of Unbreakable Kimmy Schmidt.

In addition to her career as a property master and designer, she has established transitional housing to help people with drug and alcohol addiction and victims of domestic abuse. Steave-Dickerson founded the West Philadelphia-based WEK House in 1997.
