= While You Were Out (TV series) =

- Presented by: Anna Bocci; Teresa Strasser; Evan Farmer; Ananda Lewis
- Country of origin: United States
- Original language: English
- No. of seasons: 5
- No. of episodes: 215

Production
- Camera setup: Multi-camera
- Running time: 48 mins.

Original release
- Network: TLC
- Release: July 6, 2002 – August 5, 2006
- Release: March 16 – April 6, 2019

While You Were Out is an American reality series that aired episodes on the cable channel TLC. The format of the show is similar to TLC's Trading Spaces (which, in turn, is based on the BBC TV series Changing Rooms). While You Were Out adds a suspenseful gimmick by keeping the entire redecoration a secret from the homeowner.

The series was revived in 2019, as a collaboration between TLC and new sister network HGTV.

== Premise of show ==
The series began with the following premise: An individual sets up a friend or family member with a surprise room redecoration. A typical example of an episode would be a wife who wants to surprise her husband by having the living room redone. The person being set up is sent out of the house for two days on a phony premise, such as a vacation.

While the person is out, the friend or family member with the help of a designer redecorates one room in the house, though gardens have also been made over. The initial budget for the makeover was U.S. $1000, later raised to $1500, and then $2000.

The designers must work with the homeowner to come up with a design, shop for supplies and redecorate the selected area within a 32-hour time frame, though during the beginning of the show's run, the designers designed a room, and it was a surprise to the helping homeowner/friend when the host and designer showed up on the first day. While the redecoration is in progress, a "secret shooter" trails the person who has been sent out of the house and tapes an interview with the unsuspecting person. The footage is then used for the purpose of quizzing the spouse, friend or relative at home. If the person who sets up the individual answers the questions correctly, they will win a prize that further enhances the room's décor.

At the end of the show, the person being surprised returns home to the redecoration, and their reaction is recorded. The surprised person is then quizzed for the opportunity to win a further prize.

One of the aspects that made both Trading Spaces and While You Were Out stand apart from previous home renovation shows was that they openly depicted conflict between the cast, crew and homeowners. These conflicts were usually fairly friendly, but sometimes devolved into rather bitter arguments. While You Were Out, in particular, revealed many personality quirks of both the cast and guests.

On some occasions, the individual to be surprised disliked the redesign of the home. Teresa Strasser's final episode has become infamous for just this reason. The homeowner returned to find that his deck had a large hole in it, and subsequently launched into a lengthy tirade while his wife wept.

The premise of the show evolved somewhat as the series progressed (see below for details).

== History ==
During season 1 there were four quizzes. The individual who was arranging the surprise (referred to as the "homeowner") for their loved one had to answer three of the quizzes. For each quiz there was a "booby prize" in case the homeowner failed the quiz. Normally the "booby prize" was a fun, toy version of the real thing (for example, a globe pencil sharpener instead of a real globe). The show was first hosted by Anna Bocci, who swiftly departed and was replaced by actress and writer Teresa Strasser, who remained for the rest of the first season. Strasser never considered herself terribly handy but compensated with her empathy for the homeowners—their travails drove her to tears on several occasions—and a sometimes dark sense of humor. During the Strasser era, the humorously "sneaky" aspect of the show was stressed, and many episodes began with Strasser and the designer hiding in a van or a neighbor's house early in the morning and observing the departure of the unsuspecting makeover subject.

At the beginning of season 2, Evan Farmer came aboard as host. An actor, singer and former boyband member, Farmer was much more high-energy than Strasser and was a skilled carpenter in his own right. While Strasser's humor had been verbal, Farmer tended more toward physical comedy. Farmer also enjoyed a teasing relationship with the show's designers and carpenters: where Strasser tended to lead with a nervous, mother-hen approach, Farmer was likely to chide the crew for wasting time or for their personal quirks such as Jason Cameron's sideline as a bodybuilder. New music and some new graphics were introduced, the quizzes were reduced to three, and booby prizes were eliminated. The homeowner only had to answer two quizzes, and the unsuspecting person would answer the third quiz. The third quiz question was always the same: Why did the homeowner want to do the room makeover for their loved one? Only once did an unsuspecting person get the answer wrong and lose the prize.

Both Strasser and Farmer had considerable difficulty letting guests lose prizes; on more than one occasion, they would offer "hints" so obvious that they essentially gave the prize away.

In the beginning of season 3, the budget was raised to $2,000 and quizzes kept the same. Toward the end of season 3, the quizzes and secret shooter were eliminated entirely. The homeowners also became more involved in the designing of the room.

Originally during the first season, once the rooms were finished, the carpenters drove away with the show's work truck, leaving only Strasser and the designer to greet the subjects and get their reactions. During one episode, however, the build ran so long that the carpenters were not able to leave (although the truck was hidden to avoid ruining the surprise), and they participated in the final reveal. Since then, the format changed so that once everything was finished, the truck was driven away and the carpenters were present at the reveals, allowing them to see the reactions and accept the subjects' thanks themselves.

Season 4 was the show's final season, with the concluding episode airing on August 5, 2006. The final episode was beset with problems, including illnesses on set and Farmer's flight not arriving until the final day of the shoot. The episode ended without an obvious acknowledgment that it was the series finale, although Farmer did passingly refer to the final scene as "the end of the era" and designer John Bruce addressed the camera in close up to say, "Thank You, While You Were Out."

Due to the success of the show in Latin America, Mientras No Estabas was created for the Discovery En Español channel. The show's name is a literal translation of While You Were Out and is hosted by Arturo.

In October 2018, building upon its successful revival of sister series Trading Spaces, as well as Discovery's recent acquisition of Scripps Networks Interactive, it was announced that TLC and HGTV had jointly ordered a revived, fifth season of While You Were Out. The new season, which premiered March 16, 2019, featured teams representing personalities associated with TLC, and personalities associated with HGTV and DIY Network. New episodes aired simultaneously on both channels, with TLC airing a cut of the episode focusing on the participants and their personal lives (as with the original series), and HGTV airing a cut of the episode that featured a larger focus on the renovation process.

== Other variations ==
Over the series, the producers have created different formats of the show including:

- Bringing in designers or carpenters from Trading Spaces (and vice versa—the carpenters from While You Were Out have made several appearances on Trading Spaces)
- Having "on the fly" designs in which the designer does not see the room until the day before the makeover begins, although the carpenters and host are sometimes allowed to see it early. Late in the series run, they started filming the carpenters and designers shopping for supplies on what is called day 0 (the day before general taping).
- Remaking a room with a celebrity guest. These guests have included Penn Jillette (for his partner, Teller), Shannon Elizabeth (for her then-husband), Miss Alabama 2003 Catherine Crosby (for her then-boyfriend), and football player LaVar Arrington, for his brother.
- In 2004, the series aired a crossover with another TLC series, What Not to Wear, billed as Double Crossed, in which the surprise secretly received a makeover from the show while the home was being worked on.
- Royal Renovation: An entire home was redecorated; the episode featured 3 designers: Nadia Gellar, John Bruce and Chayse Dacoda, celebrity guest Stacy "Fergie" Ferguson and a budget of $10,000.
- For one episode shot near Atlantic City NJ. the home owner allowed Farmer, designer Chase Dacoda and the day's carpenters to gamble with $500 of the budget money the day before investing any winnings into the makeover, the crew raised another $300 making the budget for that makeover $1,800.
- Some members of the on camera cast have swapped their typical roles, Farmer himself served as designer in one episode (designer John Bruce served as host in the interim), carpenter/seamstress Leslie Segrete and carpenter Andrew Dan-Jumbo have also taken turns as designer on different episodes (designer Mark Montano filled in as seamstress for Leslie, while designer John Bruce filled in as carpenter for Dan-Jumbo).

== Cast ==
A list of the crew is as follows:

=== Original run (2002–2006) ===
==== Hosts ====
- Evan Farmer (season 2 - 4)
- Teresa Strasser (season 1, episodes 11-60)
- Anna Bocci (season 1, episodes 1-10)

==== Designers ====
- John Bruce (decorator) (season 1 - 4)
- Chayse Dacoda (season 1 - 4)
- Nadia Geller (season 2 - 4)
- Lauren Lake (season 1)
- Mark Montano (season 2 - 4)
- Christy Schlesinger (season 1)
- Stephen Saint-Onge (seasons 1 - 2)

==== Landscape designers ====
- Peter BonSey (season 1)
- Mayita Dinos (season 1)

==== Carpenters ====
- Ali Barone (season 2 - 3)
- Jason Cameron (season 2 - 4)
- Andrew Dan-Jumbo (season 1 - 4)
- Troy Dunn (season 1)
- Jennifer Ann Halpern (season 1)
- Adrienne Haitz (season 1)
- Jaqui Jameson (season 1)
- Leslie Segrete (season 1 - 4)

=== Revival (2019) ===
==== Host ====
- Ananda Lewis

==== Designers ====
For the revival, designers from TLC's Trading Spaces and various HGTV and DIY Network shows will work as teams of two. The teams are as follows:

===== TLC =====
- Carter Oosterhouse and Sabrina Soto
- Doug Wilson and Kahi Lee
- Frank Bielec and Vern Yip
- Hildi Santo-Tomas and Ty Pennington

===== HGTV/DIY Network =====
- Bristol and Aubrey Marunde (Flip or Flop Vegas)
- David Visentin and Hilary Farr (Love It or List It)
- Karen E. Laine and Mina Starsiak (Good Bones)
- Nicole Curtis (Rehab Addict) and Rob “Vanilla Ice” Van Winkle (The Vanilla Ice Project)

==== Carpenters ====
- Eric Griffin
- Jordan Thompson
