= Groomed (TV series) =

- Genre: Makeover reality
- Creative director: Josh Morris
- Starring: Paul Hogan; Asha Daniere
- Composer: Angelo Oddi
- Country of origin: Canada
- Original language: English
- No. of seasons: 1
- No. of episodes: 13

Production
- Production locations: Toronto, Ontario, Canada
- Cinematography: Sebastian Cluer
- Running time: half-hour

Original release
- Network: W Network
- Release: 21 January – 1 May 2006

Groomed is a Canadian W Network makeover reality television series produced by Chocolate Box Entertainment that aired Mondays at 10:30 p.m. and Wednesdays at 9 p.m. It is hosted by butler Paul Hogan, who is famous for his appearances on the reality TV series Joe Millionaire. Co-hosting with Hogan was Asha Daniere, a Toronto native, who added a female point of view.

In each episode of Groomed, Hogan takes a "schlub" and puts him through "gentleman's bootcamp" in preparation for a special romantic event with their lady love. The show features men at proposals, weddings, anniversaries, birthdays, and other special celebrations.

== Episodes ==
1. "Frog to Prince: John Stievenart" (21 January 2006)
2. "Comfort Zone: Andrew Bradbury" (21 January 2006)
3. "Working Class Hero: Mike Bailey" (13 February 2006)
4. "Love on Ice with a Twist: Doug Pye" (20 February 2006)
5. "Steppin' out with my Baby: Calbert Humphrey" (27 February 2006)
6. "Sajeev Sharma" (6 March 2006)
7. "Casey Paolozzi" (13 March 2006)
8. "Jamie Nye" (20 March 2006)
9. "Rey Morales" (27 March 2006)
10. "Miguel Baptista" (3 April 2006)
11. "Trucker Love: Sam Yannacacos" (10 April 2006)
12. "Lee Herriot" (24 April 2006)
13. "David Moxam" (1 May 2006)
