= Frank Bielec =

American interior designer (1947–2020)

Frank Bielec (September 24, 1947, in Sealy – May 15, 2020, in Houston) was an American interior designer and artist from Katy, Texas, best known for his work on TLC's Trading Spaces, Trading Spaces: Family, Trading Spaces: Home Free, Trading Spaces: Boys vs Girls, Trading Spaces: We're Back, Trading Spaces: 100 Grand, The Best Of Trading Spaces, Training Spaces, While You Were Out and Elf Sparkle and the Special Red Dress.

== Personal ==
He was married to sculptor Judy Lynn Neal. The couple had two children, Melissa, nicknamed Mosey, who was killed when she was three years old in a car accident caused by a drunk driver, and a son, Matt.

He died at a Houston hospital the day after suffering a heart attack, according to his wife. There was no funeral service. Frank was cremated, his ashes put inside a round wooden box and placed on top of a fireplace in their home.

== Career ==
Bielec worked as an award-winning elementary school teacher in art and social studies. He then became a florist for 20 years. He joined the TLC show from 2000 to 2008 and then again in its 2018, two season revival. His unplanned audition for the show came during a Nashville convention on decorative paint when he served as a replacement for demonstrator who was ill. A Home & Garden TV producer was in the audience and tapped him for the role. It was on Trading Spaces that Bielec worked with industry names including Ty Pennington and Vern Yip.

Bielec and his wife founded the Mosey 'N Me craft company in 1989; the couple also wrote books and pamphlets: Mosey 'N Me the Book, The Four Seasons and Mosey 'N Me the Sequel.

Bielec also created and designed paper products with Houston-based design company Paper so Pretty working alongside award-winning stationery designer Michael Wolfe and his wife Shannon from 2009 -2011 under "It's Funky, it's Fun, it's Frank" line of invitations and announcements.
