= Changing room (disambiguation) =

Changing room, also locker room or dressing room, is an enclosed area in a store where customers may try on clothes before purchasing them.

Changing room may also refer to:

- Changing Rooms, a BBC television series
- Changing Rooms (Australian TV series), based on the BBC television series
- The Changing Room, a play by David Storey
