= Jimmy Little (carpenter) =

American carpenter, TV personality

- Born: James Andrew Little; January 14, 1976 (age 50); Woodbridge, Virginia, U.S.
- Occupations: American carpenter, stagehand, television personality
- Website: http://www.channeljimmy.com/

James Andrew Little (born January 14, 1976, Woodbridge, Virginia) is an American carpenter, stagehand and television personality. He is currently a co-host and carpenter on HGTV's Don't Sweat It (with Steve Watson) and HGTV's Dear Genevieve (starring Genevieve Gorder).

== Family ==
Little's father owned a construction company and his mother managed companies ranging from landscaping, lumber, painting and millwork. Little was formerly a carpenter on Trading Spaces and Town Haul. He belongs to the International Alliance of Theatrical Stage Employees (IATSE).

== Television ==
=== HGTV ===
- Don't Sweat It (91 episodes to date; co-host and construction supervisor)
- Dear Genevieve (8 episodes to date)
- 25 Biggest Renovation Mistakes (1 episode; commentator)
- 25 Biggest Landscaping Mistakes (1 episode; commentator)

=== TLC ===
- Trading Spaces (13 Episodes, carpenter)
- Town Haul (18 Episodes, carpenter and co-host)
