= Andrew Dan-Jumbo =

- Born: Andrew Ibifiniwari Dan-Jumbo; 25 June 1965 (age 61); Nigeria
- Height: 1.88 m (6 ft 2 in)

Andrew Dan-Jumbo (born 25 June 1965) is a builder and co-host on the home improvement reality television series Operation Build. He previously co-starred as a carpenter on the TV home makeover show While You Were Out, and is the current host of Take Home Handyman on TLC. Dan-Jumbo is also host of the talk show Talk with Your Mouth Full on WBBZ-TV.

Dan-Jumbo was voted one of People Magazine's 100 Most Beautiful People. He also occasionally appeared as a carpenter on Trading Spaces, where designer Hildi Santo-Tomas insisted on calling him "Jambo". He has been featured on The Oprah Winfrey Show and other television programs.

== Personal life ==
Dan-Jumbo was born in Nigeria, and raised in London, England. As an adult, he moved to Buffalo, New York, and lived in Annapolis, Maryland, as of 2008. He returned to Buffalo in 2017.
