= Leeah D. Jackson =

American teen actress, singer, chef, and dancer

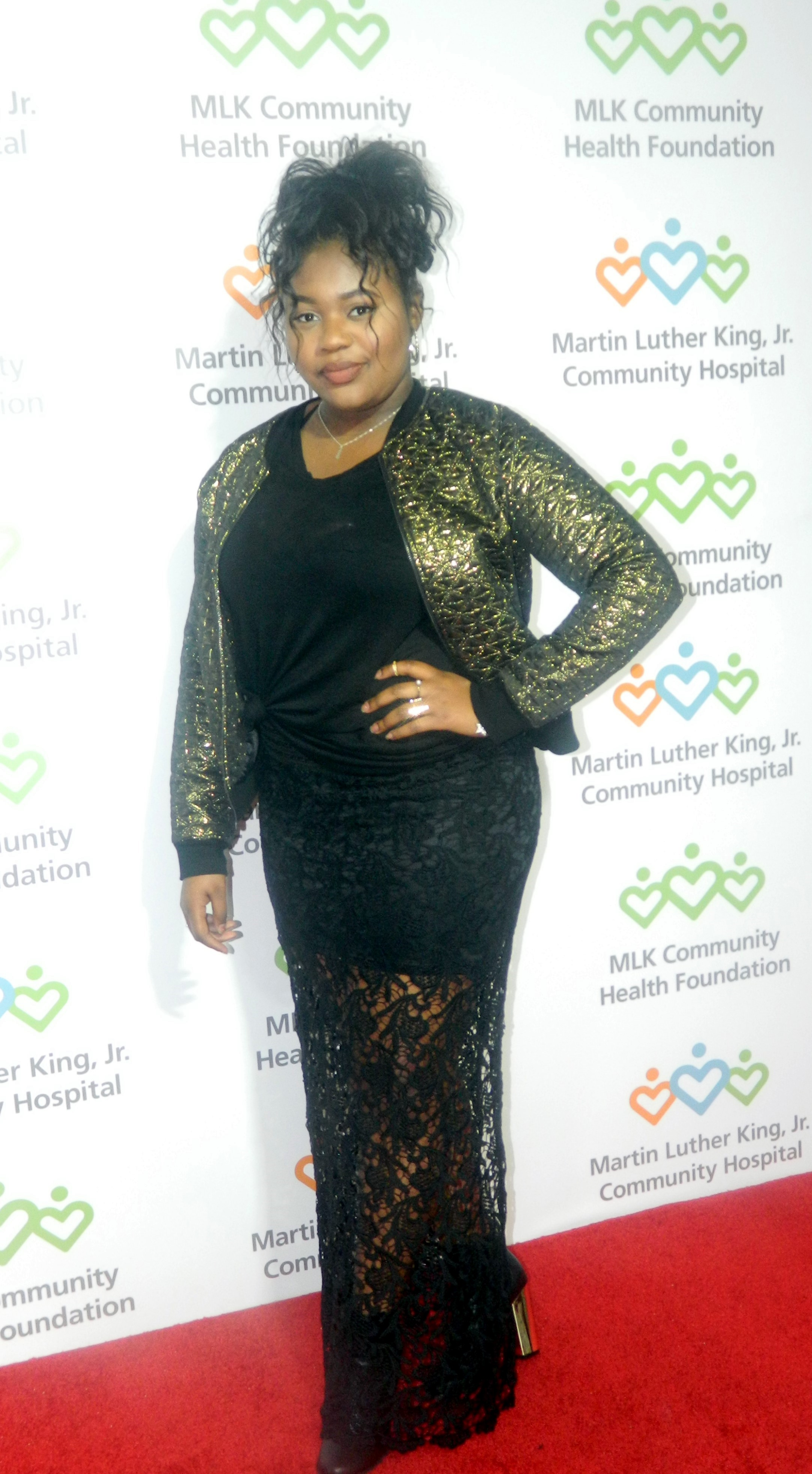
- Leeah D Jackson, 2016
- Occupations: Actress; singer; dancer; songwriter
- Years active: 2001–present
- Known for: The Shield; Boston Public
- Musical career
- Genres: hip hop; pop
- Instrument: Vocals
- Website: leeahdjackson.wixsite.com/cookin4reel

Leeah D. Jackson is an American teen actress, singer, chef, and dancer with appearances in films and television series and more than 25 commercials. She played the role of Haley in The Shield TV series. Leeah is presently a student studying "Esthetician" and "Make-Up".

== Life and career ==
Leeah D. Jackson is an actor, dancer, rapper and BMI songwriter. She began her career when she was 3 years old. appearing in television, print advertisements, commercials for companies such as McDonald's, Epson Printer, Kmart, General Motors.

Her television and film appearances include The Shield, Boston Public, Jimmy Kimmel Live!, ABC Family - HBO Jam, A Mother's Choice, and In The Hive, and music videos for Mindless Behavior's "Girls Talkin' Bout", The Rangers' "Pretty Girl Shake It", Willow Smith's "Whip My Hair", Cori B's "SMH", and Motion City Soundtrack's "Her World Destroys My Planet".

She sang for Michael Jackson at his 45th birthday party. Her latest project was her recorded single, "HeadPhones", which she co-wrote. She is reportedly attending college to pursue a career in Sports Medicine and is working on her cooking show, Cooking 4 Reel

== Filmography ==
=== Film and television ===
| Year | Title | Role | Notes |
|---|---|---|---|
| 2001 | HBO Family | Jammy Friend | Minor Role |
| 2003 | The Appointment | Katie | Short Film |
| 2004 | Boston Public | Lydia | Chapter Seventy-Eight |
| 2006 | The Shield | Haley | 1 episode |
| 2006 | Jimmy Kimmel Live! | Fun Girl | Hack-A-Shaq 1 episode |
| 2007 | The Maury Povich Show | Most Talented Kids | Rapper |
| 2008 | Nadia Geller |Date My House | Date My House | Episode #1.3 |
| 2010 | Flip The Script Kids | Entertainer | Composer |
| 2010 | A Mother's Choice | Leeah D. | Composer |
| 2010 | A Mother's Choice | Leeah | Main role |
| 2012 | Behind The Talent A Mother's Choice | Herself | TV series |
| 2012 | A Mother's Choice The Ultimatum | Leeah | Main role |
| 2012 | In the Hive | Prison Visitor | TV movie |
| 2013 | FTS Kids Radio Show | Leeah | TV mini-series |
| 2015 | Love Not Equal To LA | Dancer | Short Film |

== Discography ==
- Headphones (2012) aka Leeah D.
- Flaunt it (2010)
- My S.W.A.G.G. (2010)

== Awards and nominations ==
| Year | Award | Category | Work | Result | Ref. |
| 2012 | Shorty Awards | Best Content Producers on Social Media | "Twitter, Facebook, Foursquare, Tumblr" | Nominated | |
| 2013 | Young Artist Award | Best Actress in a Short Film - Lead Young Actress | A Mother's Choice the Ultimatum | Nominated | |
