= Flokati rug =

Shaggy wool rug

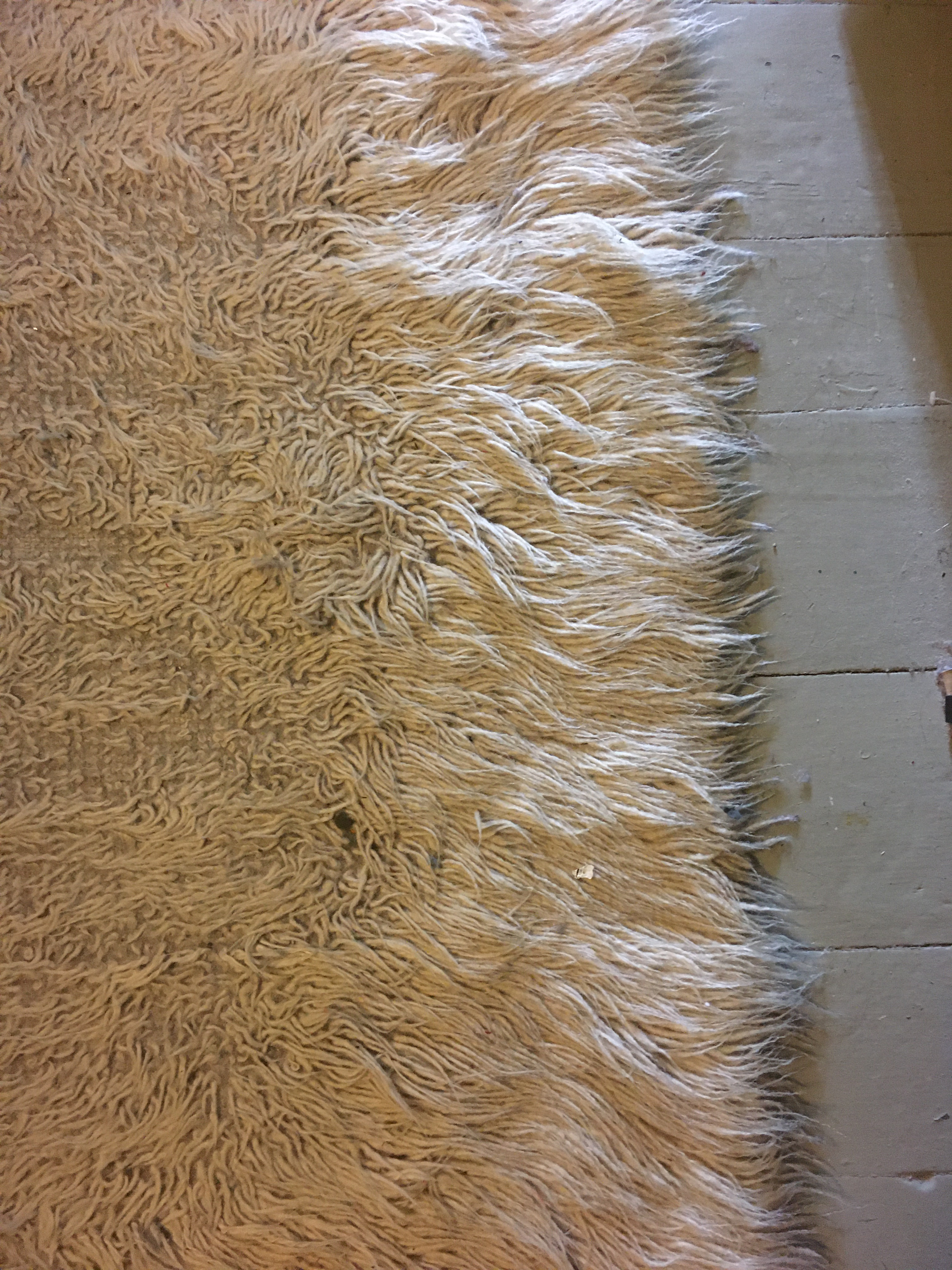
close-up of a flokati rug

A flokati rug is a woven wool rug. They are shaggy in appearance, and are thick and soft. Modern wool or synthetic rugs may be purchased in a variety of colours.

== Name ==
The word comes from the Aromanian floc, from Latin floccus. Another name for a similar style of rug is βελέντζα /vel'endza/ < Turkish velense, possibly via Albanian velentse.

== History ==
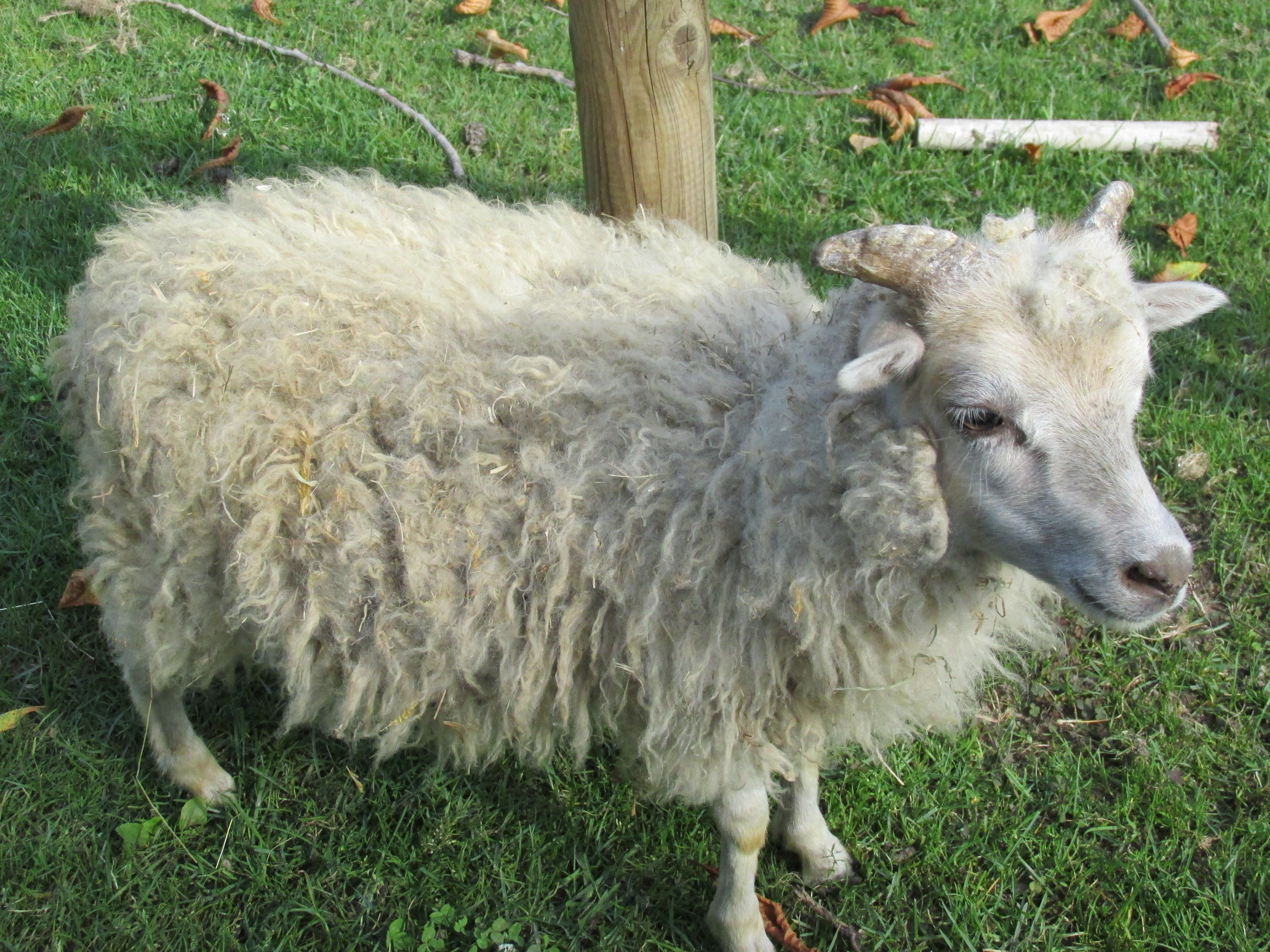
Flokati are often made from wool.

Flokati were popular in the 1970s. The word first appeared in English in 1967. The term was created by the Greek Ministries of Finance, Industry, and Commerce to apply to a rug with certain specifications: hand woven in Greece, made of 100% wool (warp, weft, and pile), with total weight of at least 1800 grams of wool per square meter. The rug must also be "subjected to the water friction process" to create the unique pile.

Gagalis Co. imported flokati from Greece starting in 1970 and sold them as "a new look in casual floor coverings."

In the October 2005 CosmoGirl, designer Mark Montano suggested a flokati rug as a solution to the question, "What if my dormmate is the complete opposite of me?!"
