= Trading Houses =

- Starring: Jason Bonham; LeAnne Yare; Kyle; Dave
- Country of origin: New Zealand

Production
- Running time: 60 minutes (with commercials)

Original release
- Network: TV2
- Release: 27 April 2009

Trading Houses is a New Zealand Reality Show where couples trade wives and renovate each other's house.

== See also ==
- Trading Spaces — the American version of the programme
- Changing Rooms — the British version of the programme
