= Diane Mizota =

American actress

Diane Mizota ダイアン・ミゾタ
- Occupations: Actress, dancer, TV personality
- Years active: 1997–present
- Website: dianemizota.com

Diane Mizota is an American dancer, actress, and TV personality.

== Filmography ==
=== Film ===
Year	Title	Role	Notes
1997	Out to Sea	Showgirl	
1997	George of the Jungle	Dancer	
1997	Boogie Nights	Hot Traxx Dancer	
2000	Boys and Girls	Dancer	
2000	Beautiful	Dancer	
2001	Monkeybone	Museum Dancer	
2001	Impostor	Receptionist	
2002	Austin Powers in Goldmember	Fook Mi	
2003	Pauly Shore Is Dead	Tritia Miata	
2003	7 Songs	Japanese Tourist	
2005	Duck, Duck, Goose!	La Religious Girl	Short
2005	Memoirs of a Geisha	Yukimoto Teahouse Geisha	
2010	Cyrus	Thermostat Girl	
2011	The Green Hornet	TV Reporter	
2013	Pluck	Principal Miller	Short

=== Television ===
Year	Title	Role	Notes
1999	Annie	Female Dancer	Wonderful World of Disney TV film
2000	Undressed	Katy	Main role (season 3)
2000	Passions	Robin	1 episode
2001	The King of Queens	Jean	"Ticker Treat"
2002	Family Law	Student #2	"Arlene's Choice"
2002	7th Heaven	Kelly	"Holy War: Part 1"
2002	CSI: Miami	Jade Horowitz	"Broken", "A Horrible Mind"
2002–2005	Filter	Host	Replaced as host by Beth Ostrosky in 2006
2003	Miss Match	The Bride	"Pilot"
2003	Trading Spaces: Boys vs. Girls	Show host	Seasons 1-3
2004	The Division	Carrie Wong	"The Kids Are Alright"
2004	Nip/Tuck	Maki	"Joel Gideon"
2005	Without a Trace	Mrs. Kim	"Lone Star"
2005	Three Wishes	Designer	"Sonora, California"
2006	How I Met Your Mother	Woman	"The Scorpion and the Toad"
2006	Dexter	Karen Yee	"Popping Cherry"
2011	Revenge	Anchor	"Trust"
2011–2013	Big Time Rush	Female Newscaster	"Big Time Rocker", "Big Time Cartoon"
2012	The Mentalist	Reporter #2	"At First Blush"
2012–13	Sketchy	Pregnant Keyboard Mom	"Make a Baby", "Birth Control on the Bottom"
2013	Body of Proof	Female Reporter	"Disappearing Act"
2013	Days of Our Lives	Mrs. Hogate	2 episodes
2013	Criminal Minds	Reporter	"The Inspiration"
2015	Awkwardness	Kelly	"Christopher James' Magical Strip Tease?"
2015	True Detective	Field Reporter	"Down Will Come"
2015	Castle	TV Anchor	"Cool Boys"
2015–16	Scandal	Anchor	"Yes", "Get Out of Jail, Free", "Trump Card"
2016	Bones	Reporter #2	"The Stiff in the Cliff"
2016	Cooper Barrett's Guide to Surviving Life	News Reporter	"How to Survive Insufficient Funds", "How to Survive Your Birthday"
2016	Major Crimes	Yu's Receptionist	"Skin Deep"
2016	American Horror Story: Roanoke	Reporter #2	"Chapter 10"
2018	9-1-1	Ann	"Buck, Actually"
2018	Runaways	News Reporter	"Past Life"
2020	Tacoma FD	Reporter	"Nightmare Manor"
2021	American Crime Story	Female Reporter	"Exiles"
2022	The Offer	Studio Reporter #1	"Brains and Balls"
