= Don't Sweat It =

- Created by: Cleve Keller; Dave Noll
- Starring: Steve Watson, Jimmy Little
- Country of origin: United States

Production
- Running time: 30 minutes

Original release
- Network: HGTV

Don't Sweat It is an American home improvement show produced by Notional which airs on HGTV. It is broadcast on Saturdays, 10am e/p and is hosted by Steve Watson. On the show, Watson leads families on a series of 3 "high octane" home improvement projects over 2 days. Assisting Watson is carpenter Jimmy Little.

== Show format ==
At the start of each show, Watson walks through the house, speaking to the homeowners about the issues they'd like to solve. Typically, Watson tackles the biggest of the three projects, as well as a smaller related project. Little usually handles a furniture or custom cabinetry build. The show emphasizes the construction aspects of the projects, rather than the design.

== History ==
First produced in 2006, Don't Sweat It began with Watson plus two sidekicks, Jane Wogan-Notar and Drew Williams. Jimmy Little was working behind the scenes as the construction supervisor. After one season, the sidekicks were replaced by Jimmy Little and James "Chicago" Jones for half of season 2. Midway through season 2, Jones was replaced by Carey Evans, who remained with the show through season 4. Starting in season 5, Little became co-host and the third member of the team was eliminated. The show was originally produced by City Lights Media, who produced 91 episodes over 7 seasons. Currently, Notional is producing seasons 8 and 9.
