= Andy Kane =

English television personality (born 1965)

Andy Kane (born 25 October 1965 in South London), nicknamed "Handy Andy", is an English television personality best known for his work on the BBC's DIY programme Changing Rooms.

== Background ==
Kane found fame on Changing Rooms, which ran on BBC Television from 1996–2004 and was hosted by Carol Smillie and later Laurence Llewellyn-Bowen, in which he appears as a talkative cockney builder who helps out with home improvement jobs the contestants could not handle. He later made three appearances on the U.S. version of the programme, Trading Spaces. He has presented three programmes for UK Style – Room Rivals, Garden Rivals and Streetcombers – the first two of which were broadcast in the United States on the BBC America cable network. He has also appeared in the LIVINGtv reality show I'm Famous and Frightened!, the Sky One show Cirque de Celebrité, as well as making a guest appearance on a sketch on The Adam and Joe Show.

He presented the 2006 home makeover programme Increase Your House Price by Ten Grand, which was broadcast on BBC America. In 2008 he presented BBC Primary Geography programmes.

== See also ==
- Ty Pennington, equivalent on Trading Spaces, the US derivative of Changing Rooms
