= Changing Rooms (Australian TV series) =

1998 Australian television series

- Logo from the 2019 revival
- Genre: Lifestyle; Home Renovation
- Based on: Changing Rooms (UK)
- Presented by: Suzie Wilks; Natalie Bassingthwaighte
- Country of origin: Australia
- Original language: English
- No. of seasons: 8

Production
- Executive producers: Erik Dwyer; David Barbour; Julian Cress; Helen Parker; Sarah Thornton
- Production location: Sydney
- Camera setup: Multi-camera
- Running time: 30 minutes (1998–2005); 90 minutes (2019)
- Production company: Endemol Shine Australia (2019)

Original release
- Network: Nine Network
- Release: 1998 – 2005
- Network: Network Ten
- Release: 13 February – 22 February 2019

Changing Rooms is an Australian lifestyle/home renovating television series which is based on the British series of the same name. Originally hosted by Suzie Wilks, it aired on the Nine Network from 1998 to 2005. It was part of a wave of many home improvement and lifestyle shows that were popular in the late 1990s and early 2000s.

A short-lived revival of the show premiered on 13 February 2019 on Channel 10 and WIN, hosted by Natalie Bassingthwaighte.

== Original series ==
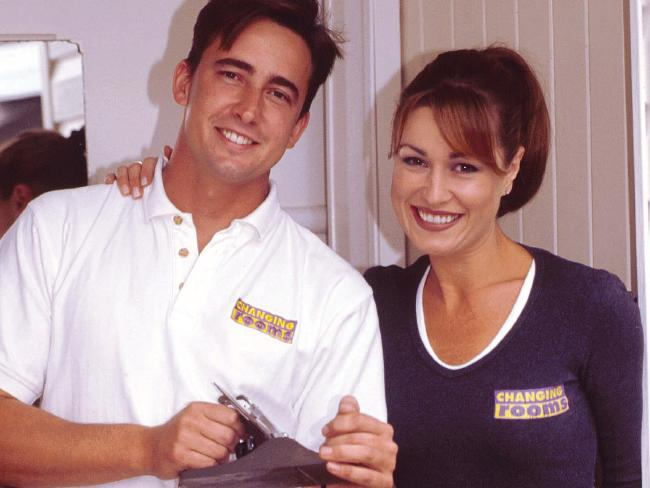
Suzie Wilks and James Lunday

The premise of the show involved two couples who would swap houses, and with a tight budget of $AU1,500 and just two days, would renovate one room in each other's house with the aid of a carpenter and professional designer. Host Suzie Wilks was assisted by handyman James Lunday and designers Peter Everett, Deborah De Jong, Glenn T and Tim Janenko-Panaeff. The executive producers were Eric Dwyer, David Barbour and Julian Cress.

The series was axed when host Suzie Wilks quit in 2005.

== Revival ==
The series was revived by Network Ten and premiered on Wednesday, 13 February 2019. It was hosted by Natalie Bassingthwaighte, with contestants guided by interior designers Chris Carroll, Jane Thompson, Naomi Findlay and Tim Leveson.

The show had the same structure as the first series but each couple would be matched to an interior designer who would help them renovate rooms in each other's houses over a period of a week. The budget for the renovation of each house was $AU20,000 and couples chose which rooms in their houses they wanted to be renovated.

Due to a "disappointing" reception and negative reviews, the show was cancelled four episodes into the season. It is still unknown if Network Ten will air the remaining episodes in the series.

== See also ==
- Changing Rooms (UK)
- Trading Spaces (U.S.)
