= Amy Wynn Pastor =

American carpenter (born 1976)

- Born: May 9, 1976 (age 49); Philadelphia, Pennsylvania

Amy Wynn Pastor (born May 9, 1976) is best known as a carpenter on the TLC reality shows Trading Spaces and Trading Spaces: Family Edition. In 2007, She starred in Backyard Stadiums, hosted by Michael Strahan. She is the spokesperson for Carpet One Floor & Home, as well as a line of women's safety equipment produced by AOSafety.

Pastor is the younger daughter of a professional trombone player, Brian Pastor, and a teacher, Barbara Pastor, and grew up in a Conservative Jewish family in Philadelphia. She was in several television commercials as a child and majored in theater at Pennsylvania State University, graduating in 1999. While at university she found that she preferred carpentry and set design to acting. In 2000 she won the role of a carpenter on TLC's new reality show, Trading Spaces, allowing her to combine both acting and carpentry.

When she is not on the road, she splits her time between her home in the Philadelphia suburbs and in Denver, Colorado. Some of her hobbies are folklore, crafts, and yoga. She also proved herself to be an able poker player in a match between cast members from Trading Spaces and American Chopper on the World Poker Tour by reaching the final table. In addition to her work on television, she has published a book on carpentry, Yes, You Can!: Home Repairs Made Easy, with Ken Sidey (2005, Meredith Books)
