= Trading Spaces =

American television reality program

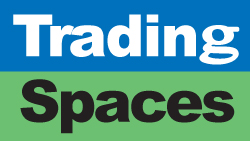
- Presented by: Paige Davis
- Starring: see below
- Country of origin: United States
- No. of seasons: 10
- No. of episodes: 332

Production
- Running time: 60 minutes
- Production companies: Season 1: Ross Productions; Seasons 2-7: Banyan Productions; Season 8: A. Smith & Co. Productions; Seasons 9-10: Authentic Entertainment

Original release
- Network: TLC; Discovery Home; Discovery Channel
- Release: October 13, 2000 – December 13, 2008
- Release: April 7, 2018 – June 8, 2019

Trading Spaces is an hour-long American television reality program that originally aired from 2000 to 2008 on the cable channels TLC and Discovery Home. The format of the show was based on the BBC TV series Changing Rooms. The first iteration ran for eight seasons. A revival began airing on April 7, 2018, with several team members of the original run returning.

== Premise ==
In each episode, two sets of neighbors redecorated one room in each other's home. Each two-person team had two (later, three) days, a budget of US$1,000, (later $2,000) and the services of a designer. Both teams in early seasons shared one carpenter, while later on, each team had a carpenter. Although the producers generally allowed the teams to go over budget slightly, there was one instance when a designer went $150 over budget and the producers forced her to return a rug she bought for the project.

The teams have no say over what happens in their own homes, but they are able to give input into what happens in the home they are redecorating. The teams are not allowed to enter their own home for the duration of the show, and the transformed rooms are revealed only at the end of the final day.

Ty Pennington, one of the show's original carpenters, later hosted Extreme Makeover: Home Edition on ABC.

== Production and changes ==
The first season featured original host Alex McLeod and some designers who never returned to the show, such as Dez Ryan and Roderick Shade, and was produced by Knoxville, Tennessee–based RVIR Media. After the first 40 episodes, McLeod left to pursue other television opportunities. Beginning with the second season in 2001, Paige Davis took over as host, with the new production company Banyan Productions of Philadelphia. Early-season episodes were traditionally videotaped in and around the production company's home base, as can be seen in those episode's titles (where the city or state and the street are listed).

Beginning in the show's fifth season, homeowners chose up to three rooms for their neighbors to re-decorate, and the rooms were selected randomly, with some rooms having increased budgets of $2000 or $3000. Midway through this season, Davis was dismissed, and the show went to a hostless format for several seasons and episodes often featured two carpenters. This change allowed the two homes to be farther apart, with the most extreme case featuring homes in New York and Oklahoma in the same episode.

On November 13, 2007, it was announced that Davis would be returning as the host of Trading Spaces beginning in January 2008. The first episode with Davis as host aired on January 26, 2008. The show also changed production companies, from Banyan Productions to A. Smith & Co. Productions. On February 6, 2009, Davis announced that Trading Spaces was not picked up for a ninth season.

On March 28, 2017, TLC announced that it had ordered an eight-episode revival of Trading Spaces from Endemol Shine North America's Authentic Entertainment. Host Paige Davis returned, joined by a number of cast members from the original era of the series, as well as new carpenters Brett Tutor and Joanie Dodd (billed as Joanie Sprague), new designers John Gidding, Kahi Lee, Sabrina Soto, and one-off crossovers from Nate Berkus and Jeremiah Brent (fellow TLC series Nate & Jeremiah by Design) and Clinton Kelly (former fellow TLC series What Not to Wear). A reunion special hosted by Lisa Joyner was also planned to accompany the April 7, 2018 premiere, featuring appearances by other former cast members. The format remained relatively unchanged from the previous seasons, although the spending budget was increased to $2,000. There was also brand integration with the online retailers Overstock.com and Wayfair; one of the retailers provided a "pop-up store" with home décor products during each episode, where a homeowner could pick an item for incorporation into their respective room.

The two-hour premiere (which included part one of the reunion special and the season premiere episode) was seen by 2.8 million viewers, making it TLC's highest-rated Saturday primetime program since 2010. On May 30, 2018, TLC renewed Trading Spaces for a tenth and final season, with a premiere date set for March 16, 2019, and twelve episodes produced. On November 10, 2019, host Paige Davis stated that there were not currently plans for an eleventh season.

== Cast ==
The show featured different participants each episode. The designers and carpenters alternate for each show.

=== Original run (2000–2008) ===
==== Hosts ====
- Alex McLeod (2000–2001)
- Paige Davis (2001–2008)

==== Designers ====
- Goil Amornvivat (2007–2008; from Bravo's Top Design)
- Frank Bielec (2000–2008)
- Nancy Hadley (2008)
- Laurie Hickson-Smith (2000–2008)
- Gordon Holmes (2008)
- Lauren Makk (2007–2008)
- Hildi Santo-Tomas (2000–2008)
- Edward Walker (2002–2008), originally a fabric coordinator for the show
- Doug Wilson (2000–2008)
- Laura Day (2004, 2007)
- Mario DeArmas (2007)
- Nadia Geller (2007; one episode)
- Genevieve Gorder (2000–2003, 2005–2007)
- Jon Laymon (2005–2007; winner of Pick the Next Designer competition)
- Christi Proctor (2003–2007)
- Rick Rifle (2003–2004)
- Dez Ryan (2000–2001)
- Leslie Segrete (2005–2007)
- Roderick Shade (2000; one episode)
- Kia Steave-Dickerson (2002–2004, 2007)
- Barry Wood (2004–2007)
- Vern Yip (2001–2003, 2007)
- Anna Ryder Richardson (one episode; from Changing Rooms; rebroadcast as "British Invasion" on The Best Of Trading Spaces episode 17, January 18, 2011)

==== Carpenters ====
- Patty Benson (2007)
- Jason Cameron (from While You Were Out)
- Andrew Dan-Jumbo (one episode in 2007; from While You Were Out)
- Amy Devers (2008)
- Faber Dewar (2004–2008)
- Andy Kane (2002–2003, 2007; a.k.a. Handy Andy of Changing Rooms)
- Jimmy Little (several episodes in a row after Town Haul ended)
- Thad Mills (2007–2008)
- Carter Oosterhouse (2003–2007)
- Amy Wynn Pastor (2000–2007)
- Ty Pennington (2000–2003, 2007)
- Brandon Russell (2007–2008)
- Leslie Segrete (2005–2007; from While You Were Out)

=== 2018 revival ===
==== Host ====
- Paige Davis

==== Returning designers ====
- Frank Bielec
- Genevieve Gorder
- Hildi Santo-Tomas
- Laurie Smith
- Doug Wilson
- Vern Yip

==== New designers ====
- John Gidding (2018)
- Kahi Lee (2018)
- Sabrina Soto (2018)
- Mikel Welch (2019)

==== Returning carpenters ====
- Carter Oosterhouse
- Ty Pennington

As of S9E2, "The Carpenters Strike Back", both are now primarily designers on the show.

==== New carpenters ====
- Joanie Sprague
- Brett Tutor

==== Guest designers ====
- Nate Berkus and Jeremiah Brent (S9E4, "A Surprise In The Truck")
- Clinton Kelly (S9E5, "Stripes & A Stripper Pole")

=== Timeline ===
Notes:

1. Roderick Shade appears in one episode and is not on the designer chart list.
2. Ty Pennington and Carter Oosterhouse transitioned from carpenters to designers in Season 9.

== Spin-offs ==
=== Trading Spaces: Family ===
Family

The first spin-off, entitled Trading Spaces: Family, also aired on TLC (2003–2005). It allowed larger teams of three or four, including children considered too young to participate in the original Trading Spaces program. The same designers and carpenters (one per episode, shared by the two teams) worked with host Joe Farrell.

Boys Vs. Girls

=== Trading Spaces: Boys vs. Girls ===
Another spin-off, Trading Spaces: Boys vs. Girls aired as a part of Discovery Kids along with airing on the network's Saturday morning block on NBC). Unlike the original, this version used the same two designers and two carpenters for each episode. In addition, there is no budget limit, and the rooms are rebuilt into theme rooms, making the show look more like Monster House. Reruns aired on The Hub until June 2011.

=== Trading Spaces: Home Free ===
A spun off series produced for TLC in 2004. In this spin-off, the winning couple received their home mortgage-free.

=== Trading Spaces: 100 Grand ===
This was a special episode where the budget was increased to $50,000 per team (while keeping the standard time limit). Designer Doug Wilson and carpenter Amy Wynn Pastor completely remodeled and equipped a kitchen, while designer Laurie Smith and carpenter Ty Pennington completely remodeled and furnished a living room. Approximately two minutes of footage from this episode is included in the Trading Spaces: We're Back online series.

=== The Best Of Trading Spaces ===
In January 2011, TLC's sister channel OWN debuted The Best Of Trading Spaces, which revisits some of the traded spaces from the series. Paige Davis hosts the new segments, including interviews with the people who traded spaces in each episode and what has been changed in the spaces since the original episode aired.

=== Training Spaces ===
Initially commissioned as part of the series relaunch, Training Spaces is a "GO ORIGINAL" online series, available through TLC on demand, the TLC website, and the TLCgo app which serves as a bootcamp for carpenters and designers, hosted by Paige Davis.

Season 1 (April 7, 2018): The theme of Season 1 is "3 new designers, 2 new carpenters, 1 epic bootcamp". Episode 1 features Tutor and Sprague being mentored by Pennington and Oosterhouse, while Episodes 2-6 feature Soto, Gidding and Lee being mentored by one of the veteran designers in each episode (Yip, Wilson, Santo-Tomás, Smith, Gorder).

Season 2 (March 11, 2019): The theme of Season 2 is "6 contestants, 1 winner", as six designers compete to be a design assistant for veteran designer Frank Bielec in the upcoming season of Trading Spaces. In six of the seven episodes, one of the other veteran designers (Pennington, Smith, Oosterhouse, Wilson, Soto, Santo-Tomás) joins Bielec in challenging the contestants.

=== Trading Spaces: We're Back ===
Also as part of the relaunch, TLC commissioned this online series of nine mini episodes featuring Davis and most of the returning series veterans reflecting on some of the best, worst and most memorable moments from the original run.

== See also ==
- Trading Houses
