= Paul Hogan (butler) =

Celebrity butler

Paul Hogan is an Australian-American former consul, butler, and television personality. He is most famous to television audiences for portraying "the Butler" on the 2003 series Joe Millionaire. He has since made guest appearances on other programs, and hosted the series Groomed.

Hogan was recruited through the International Guild of Butlers to run the chateau in France where Joe Millionaire was filmed. His primary responsibility was originally focused on the domestic and household management of the chateau, with only minor "on screen" appearances. However, as Fox acknowledged, "Paul was the glue that held the show together." The first season was widely distributed around the world, although the second season did not perform as well.

In 2006 Hogan hosted Groomed, a series in which he took regular men and turned them into gentlemen for life-changing events such as a marriage proposals, weddings or reconnection with families. Hogan was both host and mentor to the subjects.

== Personal life ==
Hogan was born and raised in Melbourne and attended De La Salle College, Malvern. After school, and a two-year stint in the Australian Army, he entered the Australian Diplomatic Service, beginning a 26-year career. As a diplomat Hogan was posted to Canada, Yugoslavia, Jamaica, the Caribbean, Los Angeles and Argentina. His area of expertise was the administration and operation of embassies, and as a consul, caring for the affairs and welfare of fellow citizens who sought assistance from the embassy.

After leaving the diplomatic service, Hogan moved to the US and opened a bed and breakfast, which he ran for a number of years before selling it. As a prerequisite to reinventing himself as a butler, Hogan enrolled as a full-time student at the New England Culinary Institute, where he completed the first half of the two-year Culinary Arts program. This was followed by a three-month private study tour to the wine regions of France, Eastern Australia and California. As a butler/estate manager, Hogan worked in Aspen, Houston, New York City, New Jersey, the United Kingdom, France, Italy and the Bahamas. Hogan has also worked as a relief/temporary butler, trainer and consultant.

Hogan became a U.S. citizen in 2012. He has two children, and as of 2013 lives in Malone, New York.

In 2013, Hogan was a Democratic candidate for the Franklin County, New York legislature, but did not win the primary.
