= Trading Spaces: Boys vs. Girls =

- Created by: Stan Rogow
- Starring: Diane Mizota; Chuck Cureau
- Country of origin: United States
- Original language: English
- No. of seasons: 4
- No. of episodes: 46

Production
- Running time: 30 minutes (with commercials)

Original release
- Network: Discovery Kids
- Release: May 17, 2003 – December 3, 2005

Trading Spaces: Boys vs. Girls is an American reality television series that is a spin-off of the home redecorating series, Trading Spaces, hosted by Diane Mizota. During the fourth and final season, Chuck Cureau hosted seven episodes until the show ended in 2005. In each episode, two friends (ranging in age from 8 to 14) redecorate each other's bedrooms in themes relating to the other's styles or hobbies. The series aired on Discovery Kids from May 17, 2003 to December 3, 2005. After the series ended, reruns continued to air on The Hub until June 24, 2011.

== Cast ==
=== Designers ===
Jordin Ruderman
Scott Sicari

=== Carpenters ===
Ginene Licata
Barte Shadlow
Carter Oosterhouse

=== Guest appearances ===
Mia Hamm
Daryl Sabara
Alexa Vega
Jim Cummings
Scott Innes

== Episodes ==
=== Season 1 ===
#	Boy vs. Girl	Age	Airdate	Room Theme	Partner	Age	Boys Designer & Carpenter	Girls Designer & Carpenter
1	Jeremiah vs. Alex	13/13	5/17/2003	Skate Park/Movie Star	Jon/Jena	12/12	Jordin & Ginene	Scott & Barte
2	Jason vs. Kimmie	9/10	6/9/2003	1970s Lounge/Soccer Field	Dillon/Stephanie	9/13	Jordin & Ginene	Scott & Barte
3	Garrett vs. Danielle	10/11	6/16/2003	Basketball/Rainforest	Matt/Abby	10/11	Scott & Barte	Jordin & Ginene
4	Nat vs. Nicki	11/13	6/23/2003	Pirate Ship/Arabian Palace	Daniel/Mia	11/12	Jordin & Barte	Scott & Ginene
5	Eli vs. Kali	11/13	7/19/2003	Obstacle Course/50s Diner	Daryl/Alexa	11/14	Scott & Barte	Jordin & Ginene
6	Mark vs. Taylor	13/9	6/30/2003	Hawaiian Hideaway/Hippie Haven	Matt/Nicole	13/9	Jordin & Barte	Scott & Ginene
7	Matt vs. Haley	13/10	9/20/2003	Baseball/Stable	Dan/Brittany	13/12	Jordin & Ginene	Scott & Barte
8	Justin vs. Megan	14/13	9/27/2003	Surf Shack/South Beach Miami	Ryan/Christina	14/12	Scott & Barte	Jordin & Ginene
9	Evan vs. Rachael	11/10	10/4/2003	Rock & Roll/Broadway	Dylan/Marissa	11/11	Jordin & Ginene	Scott & Barte
10	Burnsey vs. Shannon	8/11	10/11/2003	Hockey/Swimming Pool	Pat/Ashlee	10/11	Jordin & Ginene	Scott & Barte
11	Michael vs. Erin	10/13	12/20/2003	Clubhouse/Japan	Kevin/Ali	8/11	Jordin & Ginene	Scott & Barte
12	Alex vs. Dani	10/10	12/27/2003	Rome/India	Jarred/Zoe	10/10	Scott & Barte	Jordin & Ginene
13	Akhil vs. Jennifer	11/13	1/10/2004	Spaceship/Boardwalk	Michael/Jocelyn	11/10	Jordin & Ginene	Scott & Barte

=== Season 2 ===
#	Boy vs. Girl	Age	Airdate	Room Theme	Partner	Age	Boys Designer & Carpenter	Girls Designer & Carpenter
14	Ray vs. Taylor	13/14	1/12/2004	Skateboard/Coffee Shop	Arthur/Ava	13/14	Scott & Barte	Jordin & Ginene
15	Connor vs. Lindsey	12/13	1/19/2004	Football/Candy Factory	Sammy/Jane	11/12	Scott & Ginene	Jordin & Barte
16	Robbie vs. Janine	12/12	2/7/2004	Underwater/Safari	Dave/Priscilla	12/12	Jordin & Ginene	Scott & Barte
17	Tyler vs. Meghan	14/13	2/14/2004	Art Museum/Southwest	Randy/Emily	10/9	Jordin & Barte	Scott & Ginene
18	Casey vs. Laurel	8/8	2/21/2004	Science/Art	Julius/Erin	10/12	Scott & Barte	Jordin & Ginene
19	Mike vs. Alex	11/10	2/28/2004	Winter/Salon	Brett/Jennifer	10/11	Jordin & Barte	Scott & Ginene
20	Conor vs. Kelsey	10/14	3/6/2004	Ireland/China	Carter/Chadwick	12/12	Jordin & Ginene	Scott & Barte
21	Austin vs. Kimmie	12/13	5/1/2004	Racecar/Dream	Danny/Shelby	14/13	Scott & Ginene	Jordin & Barte
22	Chip vs. Courtney	14/13	5/8/2004	Garage/Boutique	Jared/Lauren	14/13	Jordin & Ginene	Scott & Barte
23	James vs. Erin	14/13	5/15/2004	Haunted House/Mardi Gras	Paul/Nayo	12/12	Jordin & Ginene	Scott & Barte
24	John vs. Clara	13/12	5/22/2004	Log Cabin/Europe	Rudy/Wei	13/12	Scott & Barte	Jordin & Ginene
25	Luis vs. Amara	12/12	7/26/2004	Futuristic/Treehouse	Dylan/Brooke	12/9	Jordin & Barte	Scott & Ginene
26	Andrew vs. Caitlin	12/11	7/31/2004	Egypt/Garden	Jason/Ashley	12/9	Scott & Barte	Jordin & Ginene

=== Season 3 ===
#	Boy vs. Girl	Age	Airdate	Room Theme	Partner	Age	Boys Designer & Carpenter	Girls Designer & Carpenter
27	Nick vs. Ashley	11/13	9/4/2004	Sorcerer's Lair/Pet Palace	Mike/Courtney	10/9	Jordin & Barte	Scott & Ginene*
28	Andrew vs. Melonie	10/10	9/11/2004	Jazz/Dance	KG/Tiffanie	12/12	Jordin & Barte	Scott & Barte**
29	Marty vs. Kimberly	8/9	9/25/2004	Neighborhood/Classroom	Patrick/Prutha	12/10	Scott & Carter***	Jordin & Barte
30	Brandon vs. Ashanti	13/13	10/2/2004	City/Heritage	Craig/Renae	13/14	Jordin & Ginene	Scott & Barte
31	Christopher vs. Maddie	10/14	10/9/2004	Maps/Whitewater Rafting	Max/Gabrielle	11/8	Scott & Ginene	Jordin & Barte
32	Shawn vs. Sharonda	11/13	10/30/2004	Recording Studio/Fashion	Nadir/Brielle	12/13	Jordin & Ginene	Scott & Barte
33	Garrett vs. Jessie	13/12	11/13/2004	Patriotic/Tennis	Gannon/Sammy	10/12	Scott & Ginene	Jordin & Barte
34	Dylan vs. Alex	12/12	11/27/2004	Spy/Health Spa	Hayden/Rachel	9/10	Jordin & Ginene	Scott & Barte
35	Danny vs. Jordyn	12/12	12/11/2004	Game Parlor/Mexico	Josh/Lauren	13/12	Scott & Ginene	Jordin & Barte
36	Anthony vs. Siobhan	10/10	1/8/2005	Fishing/General Store	Joey/Khusbu	14/13	Scott & Ginene	Jordin & Barte
37	Cole vs. Amanda	11/12	1/10/2005	Roller Coaster/Greek Mythology	Kevin/Ashley	11/9	Scott & Ginene	Jordin & Barte
38	Sam vs. Hannah	11/11	1/15/2005	Drive-In/Wild West	Jake/Colleen	11/10	Scott & Barte	Jordin & Ginene
39	Alain vs. Racine	14/9	2/19/2005	Anchorman/Princess	Cameron/Corrine	13/10	Jordin & Ginene	Scott & Barte

- During episode 27, Ginene injures her thumb; therefore, Barte takes over the carpentry duties for the other team.
  - In episode 28, Barte does the carpentry work for both teams.
    - Carter Oosterhouse takes over the carpentry duties in episode 29, while Ginene is still nursing her injury. She will return for the next episode along with Diane Mizota. Paige Davis is filling in for Diane Mizota.

=== Season 4 ===
#	Boy vs. Girl	Age	Airdate	Room Theme	Partner	Age	Boys Designer & Carpenter	Girls Designer & Carpenter
40	Brandon vs. Alexa F.	10/10	10/1/2005	Bagel Shop/Gymnastics	Tom/Alexa L.	10/10	Scott & Ginene	Jordin & Barte
41	Tyler vs. Chelsea	9/10	10/8/2005	Superhero/Hotel Suite	Matthew/Erica	10/10	Jordin & Ginene	Scott & Barte
42	Kevin vs. Lauren	12/12	11/5/2005	Mini Golf/Summer camp	Ben/Tori	12/12	Jordin & Ginene	Scott & Barte
43	Vincent vs. Julia	9/10	11/12/2005	Crime Lab/40s Millinery	J.R./Jenah	12/13	Jordin & Barte	Scott & Ginene
44	Kenny vs. Lacie	8/8	11/19/2005	Bowling/Poetry	Chad/Hannah	12/8	Jordin & Barte	Scott & Ginene
45	Stephan vs. Katie	11/11	11/21/2005	Hamster/Slumber Party	Collin/Melissa	9/8	Scott & Ginene	Jordin & Barte
46	John vs. Meghan	11/10	12/3/2005	Mars/Circus	Andrew/Cassie	11/10	Scott & Barte	Jordin & Ginene

- Chuck Cureau took over the hosting duties for this season.
