= Suzie Wilks =

Australian television presenter (born 1970)

- Born: Suzannah Nicole Wilks; 12 March 1970 (age 55); Melbourne, Victoria, Australia
- Occupation: TV presenter

Suzannah Nicole Wilks (born 12 March 1970) is an Australian TV lifestyle presenter best known as the host of the Australian version of Changing Rooms between 1998 and 2005.

== Career ==
Wilks' TV career began on the Nine Network, replacing Tracey Dale on the lifestyle series Our House in February 1998. She was recruited to host Changing Rooms, an Australian version of the very successful BBC lifestyle program of the same name, which premiered on the Nine Network in September 1998; that year Wilks became the first woman to host two prime-time shows on Australian television in the same year. In 1999, she dropped her Our House commitment to focus solely on Changing Rooms. That success continued through into 2001 with the series spinoff Changing Rooms Special Operations and concurrently a new series Guess Who's Coming to Dinner which ran for one season.

After an eight-year run on Changing Rooms, Wilks resigned and returned to her home town, Melbourne. She then hosted Body Work for the Nine Network, which won its weekly timeslot. This was followed by a special called Mothers In War, again on the Nine Network. She also joined the Victorian edition of the Nine travel series Postcards.

Since Wilks' time on Changing Rooms she has accepted invitations to various celebrity events and TV programs. In 2002 she drove in (and crashed out of) the celebrity race at the Australian Grand Prix. In 2004, Melbourne's The Age newspaper named her as one of Melbourne's Top 25 sexiest people. She was a celebrity contestant on the second season of Seven Network's Dancing with the Stars in 2005. She also won her episode of the 2008 series The Singing Bee and made two appearances on Network Ten's game show Thank God You're Here.

During the years 2006 and 2008 Wilks presented a weekly radio show Lunch With Suzie Wilks on Melbourne radio's 3AW. In 2007 she accepted a speaking part on the Australian movie December Boys.

Wilks appeared in TV and press advertisements for Holden cars and Cadbury chocolates. She was also the face of the Australand property group and Solomons Flooring. In 2009 she co-authored a book called RUEA? (Are You Emotionally Available?).

At the end of 2009, Wilks resigned as a presenter of Postcards, with Giaan Rooney replacing her in 2010. In 2019 Wilks said that she had left the television industry to raise her daughter.

== Personal life ==
Born and raised in Melbourne to parents Barry and Ann Wilks, Wilks completed her schooling at Carey Baptist Grammar School in suburban Kew. After further studies, she was awarded a Certificate of Journalism. By the age of 22, she had transformed her first house, a Victorian weatherboard in suburban Richmond. By the time of Changing Rooms, she had started her second renovation: a second storey addition to a house in Hawthorn. Wilks also renovated her current home.

Wilks is an active voice against animal experimentation for Humane Research Australia and the Royal Society for the Prevention of Cruelty to Animals. Wilks is also an Australia Day Ambassador.

She married Nick O'Halloran on 20 August 2010 in Melbourne. Their daughter was born in 2011. Wilks and O'Halloran split in 2012.
