= Operation Build =

- Starring: Alexi Panos; Andrew Dan-Jumbo; Alena Capra
- Country of origin: United States
- Original language: English
- No. of seasons: 2

Production
- Executive producer: Lysa Liemer
- Running time: 30 minutes
- Production companies: Insight Television Productions, LLC

Original release
- Network: History Channel
- Release: November 1, 2014 – present

Operation Build is an American reality television home improvement series hosted by Alexi Panos with costars Andrew Dan-Jumbo, and Alena Capra. It first premiered on History Channel in November 2014. As of 2018 the show's site is on A&E television.

Operation Build travels all over the country discovering home improvement concepts in renovations, remodels, and do-it-yourself projects. Part History, part reality, part building technology; each episode has a project objective. Panos and her building team are tasked to complete each project in time, while being under a renovation deadline and a homeowner's needs. Whether the team is picking up the pieces and rebuilding after a disaster, or coming to the rescue on a remodel gone wrong, the Operation Build team gets the job done.

== Episode guide ==
=== Season 1 (2014) ===
No. overall	No. in season	Title	Original release date
1	1	"Operation: Go Green"	November 1, 2014
2	2	"I'm Coming Home Part 1"	November 8, 2014
3	3	"I'm Coming Home Part 2"	November 15, 2014
4	4	"I'm Coming Home Part 3"	November 22, 2014

=== Season 2 (2015) ===
No. overall	No. in season	Title	Original release date
5	1	"The Story of Randy & Laura Myer"	March 14, 2015
6	2	"The Story of Carina"	March 21, 2015
7	3	"The Story of the Empty Nesters"	March 28, 2015
8	4	"A History of a Movement"	April 4, 2015
9	5	"The Story of The Hoffmans"	April 11, 2015
10	6	"Water Pressure and Lighting Solutions"	April 18, 2015
11	7	"The Story Of The Ronald McDonald House Part 1"	August 22, 2015
12	8	"The Story of Shiloh RMDH Part 2"	August 29, 2015
13	9	"The Story Of Atalaya RMDH Part 3"	September 5, 2015
14	10	"The Story Of Heronza RMDH Part 4"	September 12, 2015
15	11	"Our Best Missions Part 1"	September 19, 2015
16	12	"Our Best Missions Part 2"	September 26, 2015
