= Alex McLeod =

American television host and entertainment news correspondent (born 1968)

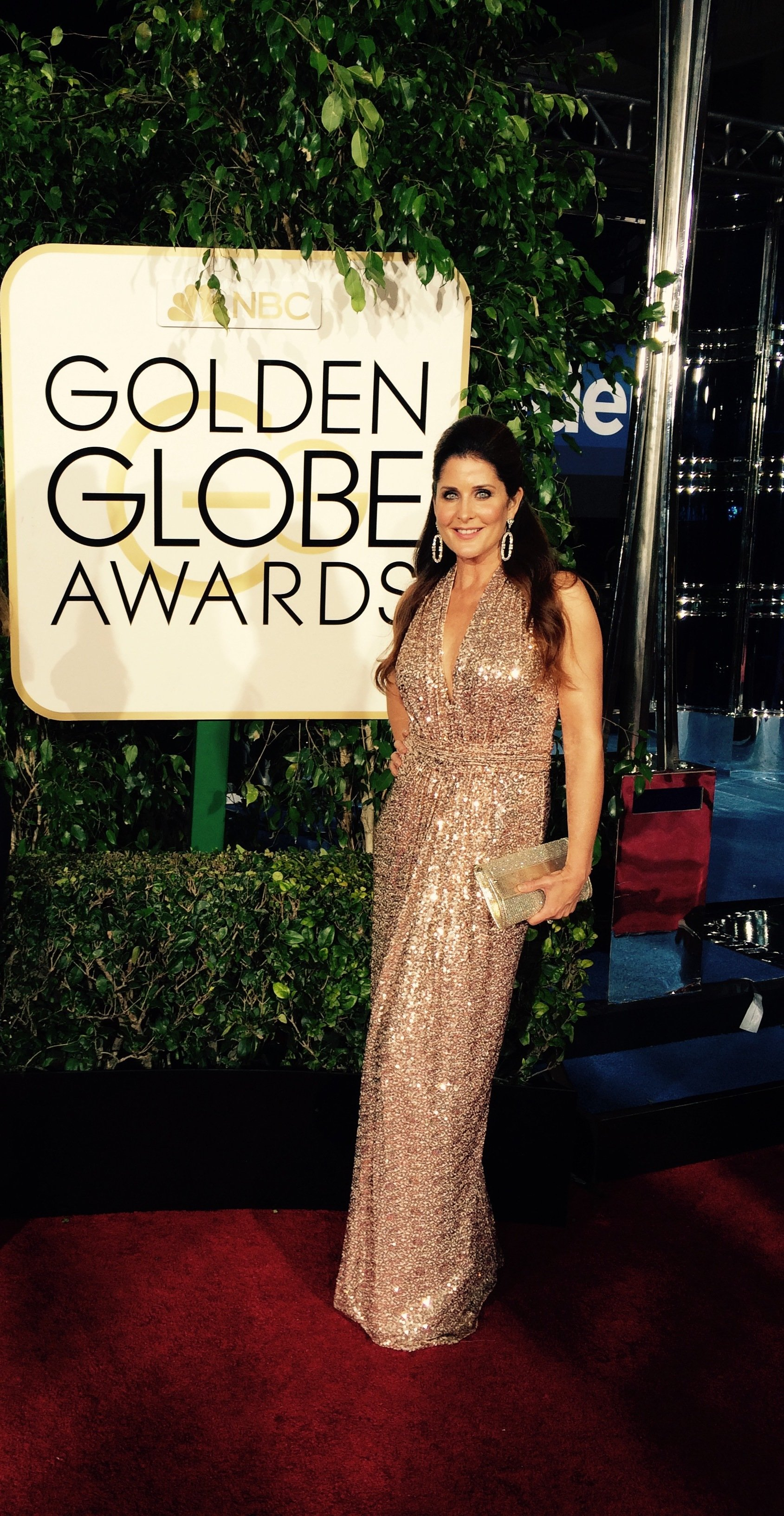
- McLeod at the 72nd Golden Globe Awards
- Born: Alexandra Ann McLeod; December 21, 1968 (age 57); Galveston, Texas, U.S.
- Education: University of Texas at Austin
- Occupations: Television Host, Entertainment News Correspondent
- Years active: 1992–present
- Spouse: John Z. Blazevich
- Website: http://www.alexmcleod.net

Alexandra Ann McLeod (born December 21, 1968) is an American television host and entertainment news correspondent best known for being the original host of TLC's hit cable show Trading Spaces. She got her start as a comedic actress and hosted the first forty episodes of the reality-based home improvement series that launched the makeover show phenomenon.

== Biography ==
=== Early life ===
McLeod was born and raised in Galveston, Texas, in the United States. Her father was a politician and real estate developer and her mother a teacher. As a young girl, she spent a lot of time on the campaign trail with her father, a former Texas state legislator.

McLeod attended the prestigious Kinkaid High School in Houston. Later, she attended The University of Texas at Austin, where she received a degree in Communications. While in college on summer break, McLeod got her first broadcasting job as a news intern at KPRC-NBC in Houston. She began acting at UCLA, where she took acting and film, history classes.

=== Television career ===
McLeod began her career in Hollywood performing in numerous national commercial spots and sitcoms (Married... with Children, Nightstand, and Partners) McLeod's first real break came as the cheeky Hollywood correspondent of the irreverent and popular film review series, Moviewatch, which aired on Channel 4 in the United Kingdom. From 1996 to 1998 McLeod spent two seasons as the sidekick to British TV personality Johnny Vaughan (The Big Breakfast, Passport To Paradise), engaging in interviews with A-list film stars, reporting movie news from Los Angeles, and performing in comedy sketches satirizing the entertainment industry. In 1999 McLeod went on to perform comedy sketches for the cable show IZ, which aired late night and on the internet, the web site formerly named IZ.com.

=== Mainstream success ===
In 2000, McLeod's demo reel caught the eye of a TLC network executive, during the casting for the first season of Trading Spaces. After viewing a sketch entitled, Will Model for Food, TLC offered her the job as host of their flagship show, Trading Spaces. McLeod signed on for forty episodes. The show was a hit and McLeod shared in a daytime Emmy nomination with her Producers after one season on air in the Outstanding Special Class Series category. TLC Executive Producer Stephen Schwartz called McLeod his "hands-down choice for host."

Linda Stasi of The New York Post described McLeod as the "perfect" host and Daniel McGinn of Newsweek compared McLeod to Classic Coke, truly an "original". When she decided to leave the show in the summer of 2001, McLeod told Newsweek she chose to "lay down her own paintbrush" and leave her Alex-cam and the demanding road schedule behind.

After leaving "Trading Spaces" in 2002 McLeod performed in back to back reality TV projects making the move into major network television with a hosting role on Fox's controversial first season of Joe Millionaire shot on location in France's Loire Valley. On the first Joe Millionaire, single women competed for the affection of a would-be millionaire who in reality was a manual laborer making only $19,000 annually. The show was wildly successful with over 40 million viewers in the US tuning into the season one finale.

Next, McLeod became the co-host of A&E's Best of Both Worlds alongside Phil Keoghan (The Amazing Race). In this two-part reality travel special, McLeod agreed to "rough it" on an economy tour of Hawaii and then to experience the reward of a luxury tour through Hong Kong.

In 2003, McLeod landed a guest co-host spot for two episodes on ABC's all-female talk show, The View as a candidate to fill outgoing host, Lisa Ling's chair. McLeod's appearance was also used again in another episode of The View featuring "Strong Women".

McLeod guest hosted on 20th Century Fox's nationally syndicated morning show, Good Day Live. She appeared on the Sci-Fi Channel as a correspondent for The Belzer Connection, a two-part special on conspiracies based on comedian/actor Richard Belzer's book, entitled UFOs, JFK, and Elvis. She has appeared as a celebrity guest on Soap Talk on Soapnet and was a celebrity guest panelist on The Test on FX. She has been featured in publications such as Newsweek, and Entertainment Weekly.

Often McLeod returns to her roots as an entertainment news correspondent. From 2003 to 2004, McLeod covered numerous movie premieres as a red-carpet correspondent for Starz Movie News. She also hosted The Weekend, a weekend of academy award-winning movies celebrating Oscar winners past and present. Both aired on the Starz family of channels. McLeod was also a spokeswoman for a Starz/DirecTV weekend promotional campaign.

In 2008, McLeod worked as a red-carpet correspondent for the TV Guide Network's Hollywood 411 daily entertainment news show.

In 2012, McLeod hosted a television pilot based on the popular food blog, "The Chocolate Tourist" shot on location in Brussels, Belgium. Of note, McLeod interviewed and assisted world-renowned Wittamer Master Patissiere and Chocolatier pastry chef, Michael Lewis-Anderson. Wittamer has a royal warrant from the Royal Court of Belgium.

=== Other work ===
In addition to being an internationally recognized Emmy nominated television personality, McLeod is a food lover and formally trained chef. In 2010 McLeod graduated from Le Cordon Bleu College of Culinary Arts and has consulted for leading food companies like Viva Food Group, Yeenin Frozen Foods, and Contessa Premium Foods, where she spent most of her time in the test kitchen transforming gold standard recipes into commercially viable convenience meal concepts.

In 2011, McLeod entered her first food competition and lead the Contessa culinary team to win the 2nd place People's Choice Award at The University of Houston Frontier Fiesta Chili Competition.

== Philanthropy ==
McLeod has been actively involved with several charities in Southern California (UNICEF, Habitat for Humanity and GRID Alternatives) and she has said giving back to her community has been what she considers one of her greatest accomplishments.

SInce 2001, McLeod has worked as a fundraiser for several charity events benefiting UNICEF and she has given motivational speeches in K-12 schools to encourage America's children to help children at risk in developing nations as part of UNICEF's annual "Trick or Treat" campaign. In 2004 the Southern California chapter of UNICEF gave McLeod a President's Volunteer Award issued by The President's Council on Service and Civic Participation in recognition of her "commitment to the strengthening of the nation and making a difference through volunteer service".

Since 2004, McLeod has lent her home-improvement skills to many Hollywood for Habitat for Humanity Blitz Builds over the years including a Power Women, Power Tools Build hosted by First Lady of California, Maria Shriver. McLeod's Trading Spaces background also came in handy in 2005 when she partnered with Moody Memorial First United Methodist Church to create a sizeable charity decorating/furniture drive for 15 Katrina families seeking refuge in her hometown of Galveston. McLeod spent several weeks with the recipients and personally delivered the items with Moody Memorial church volunteers.

In 2007, McLeod participated in the Los Angeles Habitat for Humanity-Jimmy Carter Work Project as a volunteer builder and co-host of a reception honoring 39th President Jimmy Carter and his wife, Rosalynn.

In 2008 McLeod returned to Galveston to help other hurricane families hardest hit by Ike, both as an emcee and fundraiser for a Hurricane Ike benefit concert for the Moody Gardens Hotel featuring the Beach Boys.

McLeod traveled to Haiti in 2011 with Habitat for Humanity Greater Los Angeles and partners to gain firsthand knowledge of the effects of the 2010 devastating earthquake and the ongoing needs of Haitian people. In 2013, McLeod hosted a women's luncheon and fundraiser in Palos Verdes in partnership with Habitat for Humanity Greater LA benefiting Habitat for Humanity International's Haitian rebuilding efforts in the Santo and Simon-Pele communities near Port Au Prince.

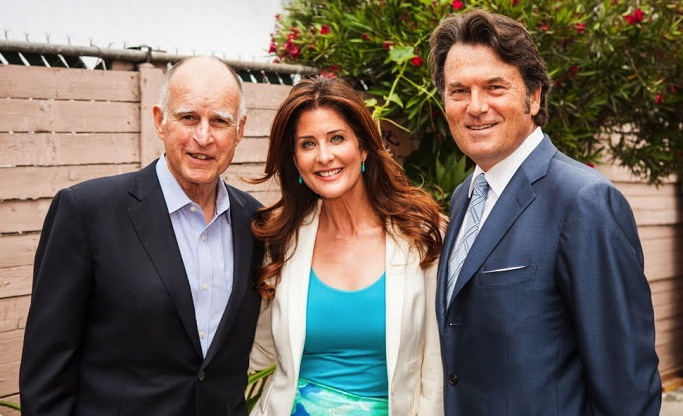
California Governor Jerry Brown, Alex McLeod and John Z. Blazevich at GRID Alternatives LA Solar Installation Long Beach, CA

McLeod is a board member of GRID Alternatives LA and recently teamed with California Governor Jerry Brown and other local politicians in 2013 at a Long Beach solar panel installation in support of California's Single-Family Affordable Solar Homes program, which provides low-income families with solar energy.
