= Paige Davis =

American actress (born 1969)

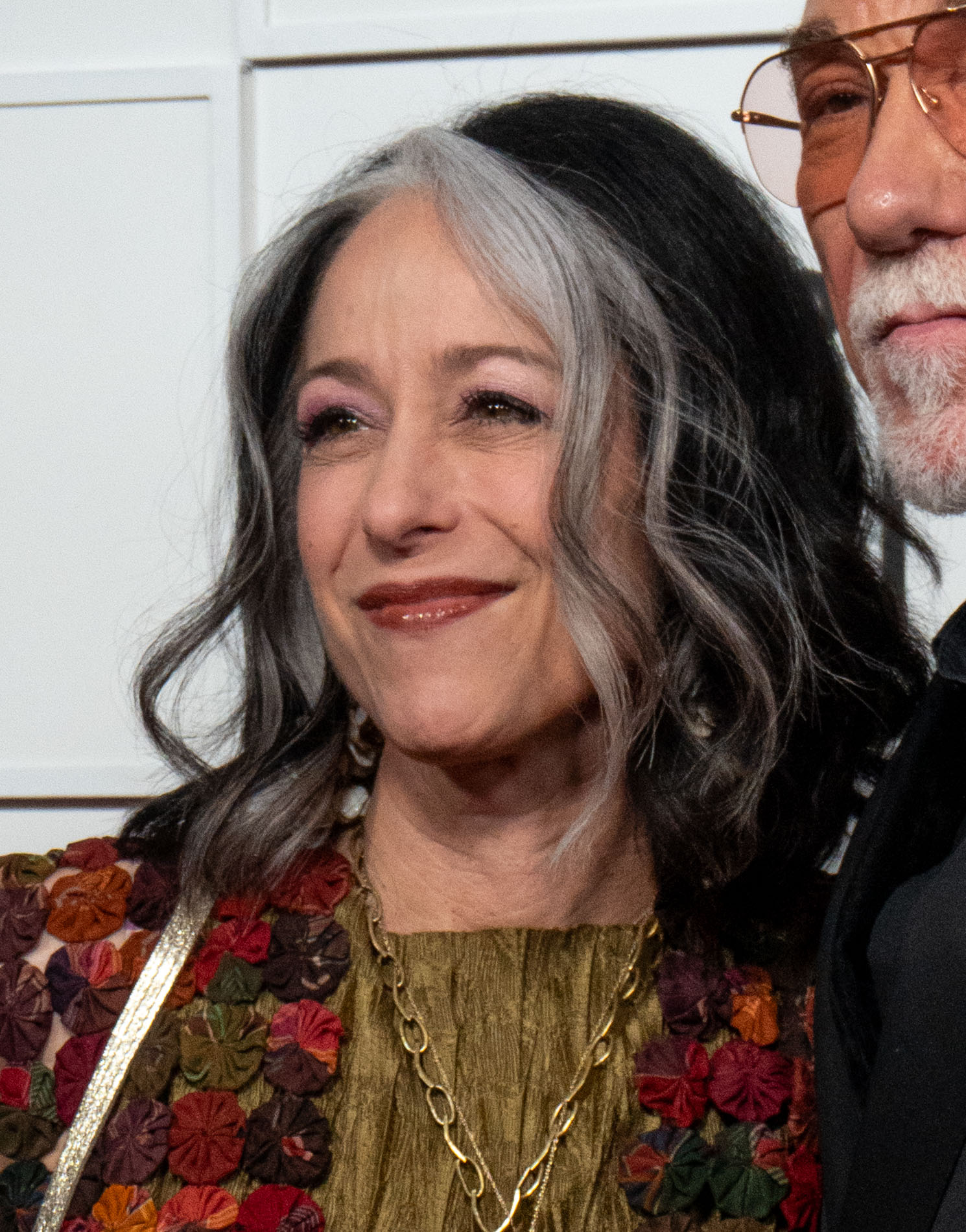
- Davis in 2026
- Born: October 15, 1969 (age 56); Philadelphia, Pennsylvania, U.S.
- Education: Southern Methodist University
- Occupations: Television personality; actress
- Years active: 2001–present
- Spouse: Patrick Page (m. 2001)

Paige Davis (born October 15, 1969) is an American television personality and actress.

She is best known as the host of the TLC home improvement reality television program Trading Spaces from 2001 until 2008, and hosted the morning talkshow Home and Family on Hallmark Channel in 2012. She returned as host of Trading Spaces when TLC revived the series in 2018.

== Biography ==
=== Early life and career ===
Davis attended Charles H. Bird Elementary School in Sun Prairie, Wisconsin, from first grade through part of fifth. She lived for a time in Louisville, Kentucky, and graduated from the Louisville Youth Performing Arts School. She graduated from the Meadows School of the Arts at Southern Methodist University in Dallas, Texas. While in college, her mother and stepfather moved to Pittsburgh.

Much of her training has been in musical theater as well as dancing, and she spent two-and-a-half years in the national touring company of the Broadway musical Beauty and the Beast playing the role of Babette the Feather Duster for her second year. During this period, she was sometimes credited as Mindy Paige Benson.

In Los Angeles, California, Davis also did numerous TV commercials and videos.

=== Trading Spaces ===
In 2001, Davis became the host of the TLC cable network's redecorating television series Trading Spaces, replacing Alex McLeod. Also that year, Davis married actor Patrick Page, with whom she appeared in Beauty and the Beast (making her married name Mindy Paige Page). Davis and Page's wedding was featured on the TLC series A Wedding Story.

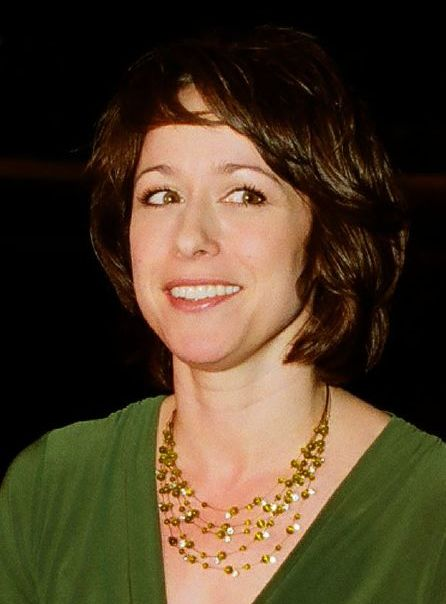
Davis in 2007

TLC dropped Davis in January 2005, to revamp the show with a host-less format. There was some media speculation that TLC's decision was in part motivated by Davis's appearance in TV Guide "wearing nothing but wallpaper" and her performance of a faux striptease in a "Broadway Bares/Equity Fights AIDS" charity event. The New York Post had reported in its "Page Six" column that Davis exposed her thong and permitted onlookers to touch her body. Davis responded to the story on the TLC message boards, writing that she had been dressed "...in a very modest, almost demure, yellow dress, cut to my sternum." She acknowledged that she had "flip[ped] [her] skirt for a second" and said that she "kept all of [her] clothes on at all times." She went on to characterize the article as "rumor and exaggeration" in its description of the event. The Post responded after Star magazine published three pictures of the event in their July 2, 2004, issue, noting that the photos showed Davis in poses that appeared to confirm the Post's version of the story. However, both Davis and the network insisted there was no connection between the controversies and the format change, which the network described as a decision to take the show "in a new creative direction." Davis subsequently signed a multi-year agreement with television syndication company King World Productions/CBS to develop new scripted and reality programming, including a deal to co-star in a daytime television program with interior designer Nate Berkus, but nothing came to air.

TLC announced in November 2007, that Davis would return as host of Trading Spaces in January 2008, along with others formerly associated with the program. Reports on the announcement published in the New York Post and in Davis's hometown paper The Philadelphia Inquirer, remarked on the earlier "bad press" in 2005, with the Post commenting, "Apparently, that 'new creative direction' has done an about-face," and the Inquirer quoting a network vice president who "doesn't know the specifics behind the perky Davis's firing, but called it 'shortsightedness.'"

Davis hosts new segments and interviews in The Best Of Trading Spaces, which debuted in January 2011, on TLC's sister channel OWN.

Good Morning America announced on July 19, 2017, that Davis would be returning to the Trading Spaces reboot to serve as host. It premiered on April 7, 2018.

=== Other television work ===
Davis made other television appearances during and after her hosting duties. In 2004, she was a guest judge on the Food Network's Iron Chef America in "Battle Egg." She also was a contestant on the summer 2006 CBS television series Gameshow Marathon, in which celebrities participated in recreations of classic game shows with their winnings going to charity.

Appearing on The Ellen DeGeneres Show on January 24, 2008, Davis shared with the audience her excitement about returning to Trading Spaces. She praised the new TLC executive team and its intention to keep Trading Spaces fresh, while at the same time maintaining the original mission of the show.

Davis joined the home improvement series Home Made Simple as host in October 2011.

=== Theater ===
During her initial run on Trading Spaces, Davis played the role of Roxie Hart in the musical Chicago on Broadway, and wrote the book Paige by Paige (ISBN 0-696-21836-4), chronicling her television experiences. It spent numerous weeks on the New York Times Best Seller list. By 2007, Davis had created a cabaret act, Taking A Chance, described as "chronicl[ing] how the choices Davis has made have informed her life's loves". In mid-2007 she took over the title role in the national touring production of the Broadway revival Sweet Charity, replacing Molly Ringwald through the end of the show's scheduled run on August 12, 2007.

In 2008 and 2009 Davis played "Gloria" in the Broadway revival of Boeing-Boeing.

In 2014, Davis premiered the role of "Senga Quinn" in Mark St. Germain's Dancing Lessons at Barrington Stage. Don Aucoin of The Boston Globe praised the performance as providing "the emotional depth and nuance of personality that can only be achieved by an actress who understands her character inside and out."

In 2017, Davis played the title role in Miss Abigail's Guide to Dating, Mating, & Marriage, an interactive theatre play, for the Pittsburgh Civic Light Opera. In 2018, she is playing the title character in MAME at North Shore Music Theater in Massachusetts.

On February 8, 2022, Davis was announced in the title role of Pioneer Theatre Company's upcoming production of Hello, Dolly! Artistic Director Karen Azenberg will direct and choreograph the production at the Salt Lake City professional regional theatre. The production will run May 13 to May 28, 2022.

=== Commercial endorsements ===
Davis was a spokesperson for RC Willey Home Furnishings, a subsidiary of Berkshire-Hathaway, with locations in Utah, Idaho, Nevada, and California, however, upon her return to Trading Spaces in 2018, Davis gave up her affiliation with them.

In September 2008, Eastman Kodak Company formed a U.S. partnership with Trading Spaces and with Davis to encourage people to explore their creativity with their photos. Davis became Kodak's celebrity spokesperson with the media through March 2009, sharing Kodak-inspired projects and ideas in the weekly design show, 30-second TV spots, on-line tips, videos, and a custom-published magazine.
