= Moving Up =

- Genre: Reality
- Written by: Jacob Fleisher
- Directed by: Sandra Beltrao; Karen Kunkel; Ben Epstein; Jo Inglott; Maggie Zeltner
- Starring: Doug Wilson
- Country of origin: United States
- No. of seasons: 4
- No. of episodes: 62

Production
- Producers: Sandra Beltrao; Karen Kunkel; Toby Faulkner; Jo Inglott; Liz Alderman; Krista Katsoulis; Jessie Vogelson; Joe Livecchi; Zachariah Sebastian
- Running time: 24 minutes

Original release
- Network: TLC
- Release: January 29, 2005 – October 18, 2009

Moving Up is an American reality television series that aired on TLC. The show originally ran from January 29, 2005 to October 17, 2009.

== Format ==
Moving Up sees each episode a family moving out of their home and then a new family that has purchased the house moving in and renovating it to their desired home. The old family then sees the changes to their old homes and provides feedback. The show is hosted by Doug Wilson, and he visits the renovation in progress and provides commentary.

== Production ==
The Learning Channel first premiered the show in 2005 with series one consisting of fifteen episodes.

== Episodes ==
=== Series overview ===
Season	Episodes	Originally released	
Season	Episodes	First released	Last released
1	15	January 29, 2005	May 14, 2005
2	24	October 5, 2005	April 7, 2007
3	13	March 15, 2008	June 28, 2008
4	13	July 21, 2009	October 18, 2009

=== Season 1 (2005) ===
No. in season	Title	Original release date	Prod. code
1	"Country Kitsch Carnage"	January 29, 2005	101
2	"Color-Blind Architects"	February 5, 2005	102
3	"Blasé Beige and Gothic Rage"	February 9, 2005	103
4	"Funky Farmhouse"	February 19, 2005	104
5	"80's Kitsch to Rustic Niche"	February 26, 2005	105
6	"Faux Finish Fiasco"	March 12, 2005	106
7	"Fixing the Naughty Room"	March 19, 2005	107
8	"From Rental to Dental"	April 16, 2005	108
9	"Pink to the Brink"	April 2, 2005	109
10	"Calamityville Horror"	March 26, 2005	110
11	"Harlem Hardware Headache"	April 9, 2005	111
12	"Wild West to Sunday Best"	April 23, 2005	112
13	"From Brother's Rest to Lover's Nest"	April 30, 2005	113
14	"Bachelor Funk to Eclectic Spunk"	May 7, 2005	114
15	"Operation Renovation"	May 14, 2005	115

=== Season 2 (2005–2007) ===
No. in season	Title	Original release date	Prod. code
1	"Vietnam to Chaka Khan"	October 5, 2005	201
2	"Crushing Grapes and Wallpaper Scrapes"	October 15, 2005	202
3	"Totally Tudor-licious"	October 22, 2005	203
4	"Tear it Up, Tear it Off"	October 29, 2005	204
5	"Floral Fetish to Field of Dreams"	November 5, 2005	205
6	"Mortgage Mayhem"	November 12, 2005	206
7	"Wedding Jitters and Barnyard Critters"	November 19, 2005	207
8	"Junkyard Best to Orange Zest"	November 26, 2005	208
9	"Victorian Vamp to Retro Camp"	December 3, 2005	209
10	"From Beach Bum to Hookah Heaven"	December 10, 2005	210
11	"All That Glitters Is Gold!"	January 7, 2007	211
12	"Wedding Bells and Breakup Hell"	January 13, 2007	212
13	"All in the Family"	January 20, 2007	213
14	"Wedding Surprise and Budget Demise"	January 27, 2007	214
15	"Shipped Out, Spent Up"	February 3, 2007	215
16	"Zen-Free Stress and Matching Dress"	February 10, 2007	216
17	"Man Cave and Orange Rave"	February 17, 2007	217
18	"All's Fair in Love and Decor"	February 24, 2007	218
19	"Red Hot Sass Meets College Class"	March 3, 2007	219
20	"Strong-Willed and Stressed Out Supermoms"	March 10, 2007	220
21	"Picture Perfect"	March 17, 2007	221
22	"Ghost Tours and Rotted Floors"	March 24, 2007	222
23	"Beige Be Gone"	March 31, 2007	223
24	"Grown Up and Fed Up"	April 7, 2007	224

=== Season 3 (2008) ===
No. in season	Title	Original release date	Prod. code
1	"Seeing Red"	March 15, 2008	301
2	"Regretting Arizona"	March 22, 2008	302
3	"Mummy Dearest"	March 29, 2008	303
4	"Design Divas"	April 5, 2008	304
5	"Spaced Out"	April 12, 2008	305
6	"And Baby Makes Mayhem"	April 19, 2008	306
7	"The Princess and Her Castle"	April 26, 2008	307
8	"Baby Steps"	May 3, 2008	308
9	"Fighting Fires"	March 29, 2008	309
10	"Bigger and Better"	May 17, 2008	310
11	"The Lottery Winners"	May 31, 2008	311
12	"Out Of The Woods"	June 14, 2008	312
13	"Color Clash"	June 28, 2008	313

=== Season 4 (2009) ===
No. in season	Title	Original release date	Prod. code
1	"Blood, Sweat, and No Tears"	July 21, 2009	401
2	"A Swing and a Surprise"	July 28, 2009	402
3	"K-9 Retreat"	August 8, 2009	403
4	"Kitchen Nightmares"	August 11, 2009	404
5	"Have a Little Faith"	August 22, 2009	405
6	"A Couple Fix Her Upper's"	August 29, 2009	406
7	"A Staten Island Ferry Tale"	September 5, 2009	407
8	"Honeymoons, Hammers and Headaches"	September 12, 2009	408
9	"Love and Laundry"	September 19, 2009	409
10	"Broken Hearts and Fresh Starts"	September 26, 2009	410
11	"Pleasing the Princess"	October 4, 2009	411
12	"Family Lessons"	October 11, 2009	412
13	"One Brick at a Time"	October 18, 2009	413
