= Joe Millionaire =

American reality TV show

- Genre: Reality
- Directed by: Bryan O'Donnell; Brian Smith; Glenn Taylor
- Presented by: Alex McLeod
- Composer: David Vanacore
- Country of origin: United States
- Original language: English
- No. of seasons: 3
- No. of episodes: 28

Production
- Executive producers: Chris Cowan (2003); Jean-Michel Michenaud (2003); SallyAnn Salsano (2022); Sarah Howell (2022)
- Producers: Marcia Garcia (2003); Tim Piniak (2003); Ashton Ramsey (2003)
- Running time: 60 minutes
- Production companies: Rocket Science Laboratories (2003); Fox World (2003); 495 Productions (2022); Fox Alternative Entertainment (2022)

Original release
- Network: Fox
- Release: January 6 – November 24, 2003
- Release: January 6 – March 10, 2022

Joe Millionaire is an American reality television series broadcast by the Fox Broadcasting Company (Fox). The series premiered on January 6, 2003, and concluded with the finale of its second season on November 24, 2003. Both seasons followed a group of single women in competition for the affection of a bachelor. The women were under the belief that the bachelor was a millionaire; however, he was actually a working class average Joe. If the final remaining woman still accepted the bachelor after learning about the ruse, the two split a $1,000,000 reward. The series was hosted by American television presenter Alex McLeod.

The first season of Joe Millionaire experienced high success in ratings, with its season finale being the highest-rated entertainment program (excluding Super Bowl lead-out programs) aired on network television since 2000. The second season, titled The Next Joe Millionaire, experienced disappointing ratings throughout its run. In 2005, Joe Millionaire and The Next Joe Millionaire were among several television programs cited in a class-action lawsuit filed by the Writers Guild of America concerning labor law violations.

In November 2021, Fox announced a revival entitled Joe Millionaire: For Richer or Poorer, which aired from January 6 to March 10, 2022. The revival featured two bachelors, one a working-class man and the other a secret millionaire.

== First season ==
The women were not aware that the bachelor, Evan Marriott, was in fact a working-class construction worker. The Smoking Gun later discovered that Marriott had also been an underwear model. A theme throughout the first season was Marriott's attempt to ascertain which of the twenty contestants were sincere and which ones were simply seeking a wealthy mate. Season 1 was helmed by showrunner and co-executive producer Liz Bronstein, whose vision of the show as a spoof of The Bachelor and comedic send-up of reality shows was widely praised.

The show made a minor star out of Paul Hogan, the manservant whose role developed, in the words of the network, "into the glue that held the show together". Hogan was not actually the host of the program: Alex McLeod was the program's host, although she appeared only briefly on each episode for an estimated total of five minutes during the six-episode season.

Runner-up Sarah Kozer received notoriety when the media reported during the course of the show that she had appeared in bondage videos while she was attending law school. A scene from the show implied that Kozer and Marriott engaged in a sex act while out for a walk together. Marriott and Kozer claim no sex acts occurred. In the VH1 program VH1 News Presents: Reality TV Secrets Revealed she alleges that her statement, "let's go somewhere quiet" was in fact spoken while she was receiving a back massage from another female contestant and that the producers dubbed it in during post-editing and added suggestive sound effects and subtitles. The show's editors corroborated this fact later in an interview for Radar magazine.

Zora Andrich was the last woman to be chosen by Marriott, and they split a bonus prize of $1 million. Their relationship did not last.

Joe Millionaire was filmed primarily at the Château de la Bourdaisière in the countryside of the commune of Montlouis-sur-Loire in the Indre-et-Loire département in France. Marriott is said to have made upwards of $2.5 million between Fox Networks payout, personal appearances, and commercials. In 2004, he hosted the less popular Game Show Network show Fake A Date. Marriott went back to contracting in Orange County, California, and started his own business. In hiring a bachelor, Marriott explained that Fox "needed a guy that was in construction but didn't have kids, hadn't been in jail, wasn't on drugs."

The series was highly successful for Fox; the two-hour season finale was seen by at least 34.6 million viewers, which made it one of Fox's highest-rated entertainment programs to date. Fox stated that, excluding Super Bowl lead-outs, it was the highest-rated entertainment program on television since the first season finale of Survivor in 2000.

== The Next Joe Millionaire ==
The second season, released in 2003, was set in Northern and Central Italy, primarily at the Villa Oliva in Tuscany. Marriott was replaced by 24-year-old David Smith from Midland, Texas, who, viewers were told, had earned only $11,000 the previous year as a cowboy on the rodeo circuit. Needing to find contestants who were unaware of the first show, the producers went to Europe and cast 14 English-speaking European women from the Czech Republic, Germany, the Netherlands, Italy, and Sweden. During casting, the women were told by Fox casting agents that the show they were going to appear on would involve a group of European women interacting with American men on an island somewhere. There was also a new "hostess", a then-unknown Samantha Harris. The butler was, once again, played by Paul Hogan.

However, the second season of the show was much less popular than the first; Fox's head of entertainment Sandy Grushow stated that "our instincts told us from the very beginning that Joe Millionaire was a one-time stunt and I think we got greedy." He added, "We tried to sneak it by the American public a second time and we got called on it."

The show's climax occurred when one of the contestants, Linda Kazdová, from the Czech Republic, was brought back to the show after eliminating herself and was later selected by Smith as the winner. But this failed to significantly boost the show’s ratings.

Instead of sharing a million dollars, as Andrich and Marriott had in the first show, Smith was awarded a ranch in Texas, while Kazdova received $250,000. As with the first installment, the couple's post-show interaction was short-lived, as Smith and Kazdova were separated by distance shortly after the show aired.

The Next Joe Millionaire drew fewer than 7 million viewers a week, with a season finale attracting only 9 million viewers.

== For Richer or Poorer ==
In October 2021, Fox Alternative Entertainment announced that a reboot of the series produced by SallyAnn Salsano, Joe Millionaire: For Richer or Poorer, would premiere on January 6, 2022. For Richer or Poorer features women competing over two bachelors: one of the bachelors is a millionaire, but the women do not know which.

=== Cast ===
This season of Joe Millionaire has two bachelors: Kurt F. Sowers and Steven McBee. Sowers is a 32-year-old construction manager and CEO from Charlotte, North Carolina and McBee is a 27-year-old farmer and CEO from Gallatin, Missouri. For this season, the butler and host is Martin Andrew.

==== Contestants ====
There are 18 contestants this season.

Name	Age	Hometown	Occupation	Outcome	Place
Calah Jackson	28	Dallas, Texas	Project Manager	Steven's winner	1
Amanda Pace	28	Newport, California	Fashion Designer and Entrepreneur	Kurt's winner	1
Annie Jorgensen	25	New York City, New York	Digital Creative Strategist	Steven's runner-up	2
Carolyn Moore	30	Orlando, Florida	Skincare Company Owner	Kurt's runner-up	2
Whitney Young	25	Lake Oswego, Oregon	Talent Acquisition Executive	Eliminated (Episode 9)	5
Amber S.	28	Fort Lauderdale, Florida	Realtor	Eliminated (Episode 9)	6
Breanna Hagen	27	Inver Grove Heights, Minnesota	Graduate Admissions Specialist	Eliminated (Episode 7)	7
Suzan E.	28	San Antonio, Texas	Supplier Management Operations	Eliminated (Episode 6)	8
Jennie K.	29	San Diego, California	Attorney	Eliminated (Episode 5)	9
Suzette James	31	Los Angeles, California	Realtor	Eliminated (Episode 4)	10–12
Katy Johnson	33	Los Angeles, California	Travel Blogger	Eliminated (Episode 4)	10–12
Andreea M.	31	Newport, Rhode Island	Restaurateur	Eliminated (Episode 4)	10–12
Sara S.	22	Houston, Texas	Influencer and Model	Eliminated (Episode 3)	13
Rachel Vinson	30	Los Angeles, California	Attorney	Quit (Episode 3)	14
Doris Cano	32	Bethpage, New York	Dance Company Owner	Eliminated (Episode 2)	15
Monica Aksamit	31	Brooklyn, New York	Olympic fencing medalist	Eliminated (Episode 1)	16–17
Brookell B.	30	Los Angeles, California	Model	Eliminated (Episode 1)	16–17
Caroline Campbell	23	Nashville, Tennessee	Recruiter	Eliminated (Episode 1)	18

== British version ==
A short-lived British version called Joe Millionaire UK ran on E4 from November 27, 2003, until January 1, 2004, hosted by Rebecca De Young while the bachelor, in general, was Dominic Lijertwood.

== Ratings ==
=== Season 1 ===
Viewership and ratings per episode of Joe Millionaire
No.	Title	Air date	Timeslot (ET)	Rating/share (18–49)	Viewers (millions)	Ref.
1	"The Beginning"	January 6, 2003	Monday 9:00 p.m.	10.1/22	18.61	
2	"Episode 2"	January 13, 2003	Monday 9:00 p.m.	9.4/21	17.53	
3	"Episode 3"	January 20, 2003	Monday 9:00 p.m.	10.0/22	18.82	
4	"Episode 4"	January 27, 2003	Monday 9:00 p.m.	11.0/25	20.34	
5	"Episode 5"	February 3, 2003	Monday 9:00 p.m.	10.8/24	20.60	
6	"Episode 6"	February 10, 2003	Monday 9:00 p.m.	12.9/28	24.06	
7	"The Last Episode"	February 17, 2003	Monday 8:00 p.m.	14.9/33	29.28	
8	"The Last Episode, Part 2"	February 17, 2003	Monday 9:00 p.m.	20.4/40	40.03	
9	"The Aftermath"	February 24, 2003	Monday 9:00 p.m.	10.2/23	19.50	

=== Season 2 ===
Viewership and ratings per episode of Joe Millionaire
No.	Title	Air date	Timeslot (ET)	Rating/share (18–49)	Viewers (millions)	Ref.
1	"Season 2 Premiere"	October 20, 2003	Monday 8:00 p.m.	3.2/9	6.76	
2	"Episode 2"	October 27, 2003	Monday 8:00 p.m.	2.5/7	5.92	
3	"Episode 3"	October 28, 2003	Tuesday 8:00 p.m.	2.8/8	6.50	
4	"Episode 4"	November 3, 2003	Monday 8:00 p.m.	2.6/7	5.92	
5	"Episode 5"	November 10, 2003	Monday 8:00 p.m.	2.4/6	5.41	
6	"Episode 6"	November 10, 2003	Monday 9:00 p.m.	2.9/7	6.40	
7	"Episode 7"	November 17, 2003	Monday 8:00 p.m.	2.2/6	4.88	
8	"Episode 8"	November 17, 2003	Monday 9:00 p.m.	3.1/7	6.88	
9	"Episode 9"	November 24, 2003	Monday 8:00 p.m.	3.5/9	7.60	

=== Season 3 ===
Viewership and ratings per episode of Joe Millionaire
No.	Title	Air date	Rating/share (18–49)	Viewers (millions)	DVR (18–49)	DVR viewers (millions)	Total (18–49)	Total viewers (millions)	Ref.
1	"2 Joes Are Better Than 1"	January 6, 2022	0.4/3	1.73	—N/a	—N/a	—N/a	—N/a	
2	"Admit It, You're a Gold Digger!"	January 13, 2022	0.4/3	1.61	—N/a	—N/a	—N/a	—N/a	
3	"Movie Night Meltdown"	January 20, 2022	0.3/2	1.65	0.1	0.28	0.4	1.94	(Note: Live+7 ratings were unavailable, so Live+3 ratings have been used instead.)
4	"Campfire, Cuddles, S'more Drama"	January 27, 2022	0.3/3	1.58	0.1	0.26	0.4	1.84	
5	"Pool Party Paradise"	February 3, 2022	0.3/2	1.68	—N/a	—N/a	—N/a	—N/a	
6	"Ready, set, JOE!"	February 10, 2022	0.3/2	1.42	—N/a	—N/a	—N/a	—N/a	
7	"Your Daughters are Double Dipping"	February 17, 2022	0.3/3	1.63	—N/a	—N/a	—N/a	—N/a	
8	"Meet the Joes' Families..."	February 24, 2022	0.3/2	1.44	0.1	0.33	0.4	1.77	
9	"You're the Joe for Me"	March 3, 2022	0.3/2	1.36	0.1	0.31	0.3	1.67	
10	"Dates, Decisions, and Dollar Amount Revealed"	March 10, 2022	0.4/3	1.76	0.1	0.35	0.4	2.12	
