= Nadia Geller =

Interior designer

Nadia Geller is an American interior designer, artist and television personality from Schaumburg, Illinois, near Chicago. She is best known for her roles as a host and designer on The Learning Channel While You Were Out, Home Made Simple and Trading Spaces. She has been cast in TLC's upcoming series Date My House.

== Early life ==
Geller was born in Chicago. As a child, Geller helped friends and family redo rooms in their homes. At Schaumburg High School, Geller was a successful long-distance runner until she enrolled at art classes in college.

== Career ==
Geller moved to New York City in 1999 and worked as a freelance designer until she was hired by the New York furniture company ABC Carpet and Home, where Geller created the store's signature visual merchandising displays.

During this time, Nadia joined the cast of While You Were Out as an on-air designer. She appeared on While You Were Out from the show's second through fourth (and final) season.

She also made guest appearances on TLCTrading Spaces.

In 2006, she was a regular cast member of TLC's Home Made Simple.

In 2008, Geller will appear as a regular cast member on TLC's Date My House.

Geller now lives in Los Angeles and operates her own Interior Design company Nadia Geller Designs. Her company has recently won several awards for model home merchandising..
