= Mark Montano =

American interior designer, artist, and writer (born 1965)

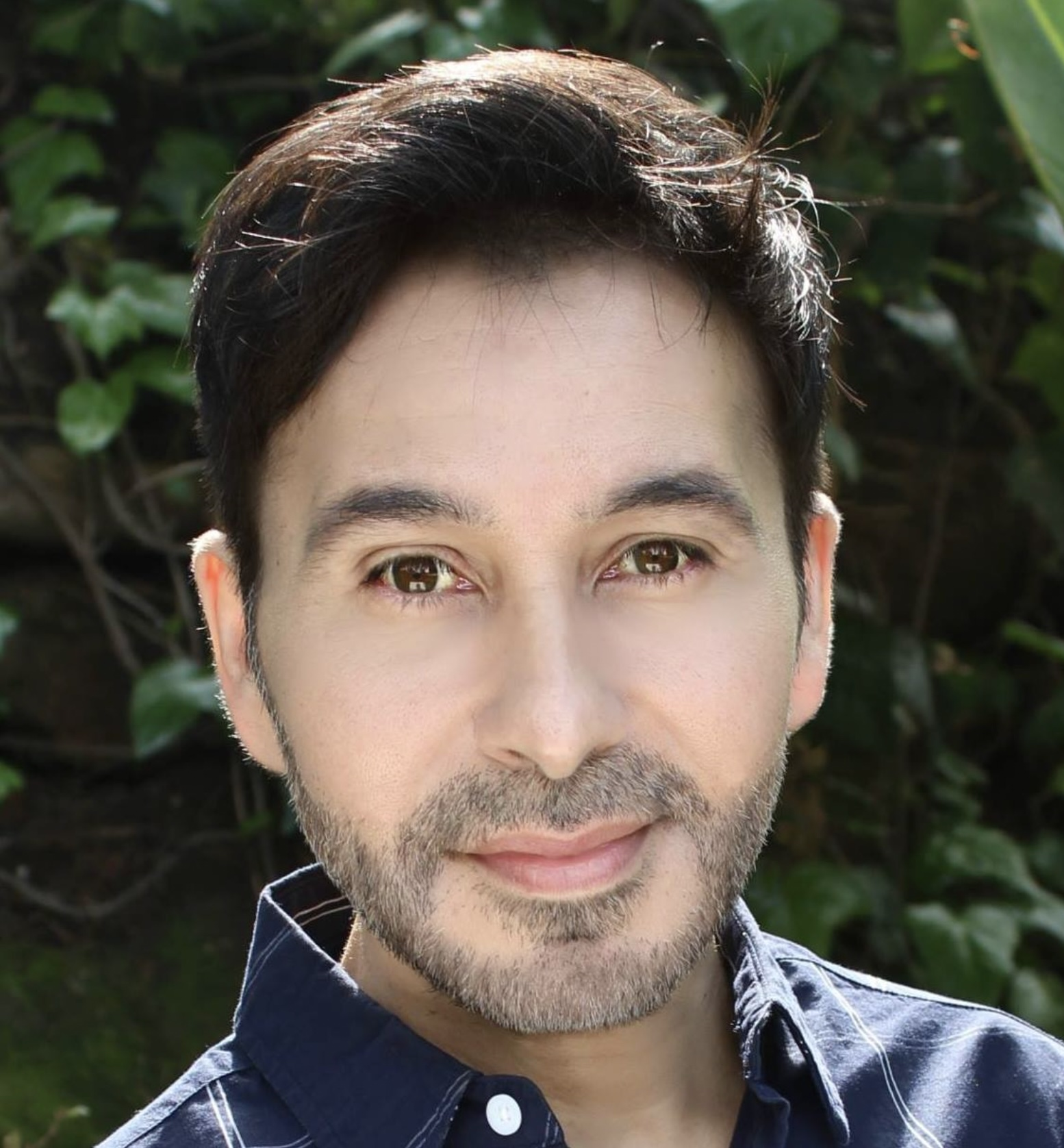
- Interior designer, artist, columnist, and television host Mark Montano: author of the best-selling "The Big-Ass Book of Crafts" and "The Big-Ass Book of Home Decor", both published by SimonSpotlight.
- Born: June 12, 1965 (age 60)
- Website: http://www.markmontano.com

Mark Montano is an American interior designer, artist, writer, and TV personality.

== Television ==
Mark Montano is perhaps best known for three series on the Style Network and The Learning Channel. These series are "10 Years Younger", which he hosted; "While You Were Out", on which he frequently appears as a designer; and "My Celebrity Home", on which he is both host and designer. Montano can currently be seen on WE TV's new show, "She's Moving In". Montano has a flamboyant design sense that homeowners in "While You Were Out" are sometimes less enthused about at first, but are usually won over by his boisterous personality. In 2021, he co-starred with Chrissy Metz (This Is Us) and Leann Rimes to host "Meet Your Makers Showdown" for Discovery +.

On "My Celebrity Home", Mark tours a celebrity's home and gives their style to a fan. Mark filmed "MY HOME 2.0", which aired on FOX and FIOS channels nationwide in April 2010. In 2015, Mark produced and filmed a 12-episode, half-hour series called "Make Your Mark". Make Your Mark is a DIY show based on his blog and YouTube channel and currently airs on most public television stations.

== The Big-Ass Book of Crafts (2008) and other works ==
Mark Montano is the author of several successful books. "The Big-Ass Book of Crafts", published through Simon Spotlight, a subsidiary of Simon & Schuster, owned by parent company CBS, was released on February 18, 2008, and is now the number 1 selling craft book in America. As of January 2009, "The Big-Ass Book of Crafts" was in its 7th printing. "The Big-Ass Book of Home Decor" was on shelves in April 2010. In January 2011, "Pulp Fiction: Perfect Paper Projects" was published and on October 11, "The Big-Ass Book of Crafts 2" was officially on bookstore shelves everywhere. "The Big-Ass Book of Bling" also hit the shelves on November 1, 2012.

Various projects from Mark's books are available in tutorial form on his official blog and YouTube channel.

== Bibliography ==
- "The Big Ass Book of Bling" (2012) ISBN 1451685289
- "The Big Ass Book of Crafts 2" (2011) ISBN 1451627807
- Pulp Fiction: Perfect Paper Projects (2011) ISBN 157421697X
- The Big-Ass Book of Home Decor (2010) ISBN 1584798254
- The Big-Ass Book of Crafts (2008) ISBN 978-1-4169-3785-2
- Super Suite: The Ultimate Bedroom Makeover Guide for Girls (2002) ISBN 0789308118
- Window Treatments and Slipcovers for Dummies (2005) ISBN 0764584480
- Dollar Store Decor: 100 Projects for Lush Living That Won't Break the Bank (2005) ISBN 0789313030
