= National Black MBA Association =

- Founder: Founded in 1970 at the University of Chicago
- Type: Non-profit organization
- Purpose: Educational and economic empowerment for African Americans
- Location: United States
- Method: Networking, leadership development, mentorship
- Website: nbmbaa.org

The National Black MBA Association (NBMBAA) is a non‐profit organization founded in 1970 at the University of Chicago.
