= GRID Alternatives =

United States Solar power non-profit

- Formation: 2001
- Founder: Erica Mackie and Tim Sears
- Founded at: Oakland, CA
- Type: 501(c)(3)
- Tax ID no.: 26-0043353
- Website: gridalternatives.org

GRID Alternatives (GRID) is a national 501(c)(3) nonprofit organization based in Oakland, California. Founded by Erica Mackie and Tim Sears in 2004, it installs solar power systems and provides job training for underserved communities and operates in the United States, Mexico, Nicaragua, and Nepal.

== History ==
Grid, styled "GRID," was founded during the 2001 California energy crisis by Erica Mackie, P.E., and Tim Sears, P.E., two engineering professionals. According to a U.S. Environmental Protection Agency program profile, it "piloted its flagship Solar Affordable Housing Program in the San Francisco Bay Area in 2004, and subsequently expanded to other parts of the state."

In 2008, the company was selected by the California Public Utilities Commission to serve as the statewide program manager for its Single-family Affordable Solar Homes (SASH) incentive program, prompting an expansion across the state.

In 2013, Grid expanded its work outside of California for the first time in Colorado.

GRID Mid-Atlantic, serving Washington, D.C., Maryland, and Virginia, was launched in September 2014. In 2017, GRID Alternatives Mid-Atlantic was selected to administer Solar Works DC, a program of the Washington, D.C. Department of Energy & Environment (DOEE) and Department of Employment Services (DOES).

== Regional affiliates ==
Grid has nine regional affiliates; seven serving California and offices in Denver, Colorado and Washington, D.C. It also partners with Indigenous tribes throughout the country through its National Tribal Solar Program, of which Tim Willink, from Pueblo Pintado, New Mexico, of the Navajo Nation, is director. Grid has installed over 900 residential solar systems with tribes and brought solar PV to the vast majority of homes on the Bishop Paiute Reservation in California.

In September 2017, regional affiliate GRID Alternatives Tri-State, serving New York, New Jersey and Connecticut, closed due to a recent Federal trade case decision that created uncertainty around future solar panel prices. In their press release, however, the company stated,

GRID Tri-State will continue to operate as a board-driven organization that will focus on advocating for strong low-income solar policies that would allow us to staff back up in the future. We will also continue to offer no-cost solar technical assistance to multifamily affordable housing owners throughout the region, and help owners who want to move forward with projects bid them out to other local solar contractors.

== Awards and recognition ==
- 2018 – Solar Power World Innovators and Influencers (Erika Symmonds)
- 2018 – GreenBiz Clean Energy Equity Showcase Honoree
- 2017 – International Renewable Energy Council National 3iAward recipient - Energy Hero (Mackie)
- 2015 – Green for All Climate Champion (Stan Greschner)
- 2014 – White House Champions of Change for Solar Deployment (Sears)
- 2013 – Clean Energy and Empowerment Award (Mackie), C3E, the Clean Energy Education and Empowerment program, a partnership between U.S. Department of Energy (DOE) and the MIT Energy Initiative (MITEI).
