= Monster House (American TV series) =

2003 American TV series

- Created by: Thom Beers
- Starring: Steve Watson
- Country of origin: United States
- No. of seasons: 4
- No. of episodes: 68

Production
- Running time: 60 minutes
- Production company: Original Productions

Original release
- Network: Discovery Channel
- Release: June 2, 2003 – February 27, 2006

Monster House was a Discovery Channel television program that documented the themed remodeling of a residence in a five-day time frame. In 2004, the episode "Zen House" was nominated for a Primetime Emmy Award for Outstanding Main Title Theme Music for its opening song by composer Dan Mackenzie.

In early 2006, Discovery Channel announced the show had been canceled and the final episode, titled "Farewell House", aired in February.

Monster House was rerun in 2012 on Spike TV and in 2015 on BUZZR.

== Premise ==
Home owners apply to Monster House to have their houses radically remodeled according to themes they specify, for example dinosaurs, Egypt and gangsters. The show's host, Steve Watson, then recruits a team of five or six builders, who almost always do not know each other, to radically remodel any parts of a house (including yards) that the show's producers choose, although the home owner may declare some areas "off-limits". The builders win prize packages of tools, worth thousands of dollars, if the build is completed on time. The build starts on a Monday morning and must be finished by midnight on Friday. Often, the builders will have to get all of the constructing, fabrication, and furniture in place, and the in-show designer (who was not recruited) would finish hanging curtains, place pillows, make the bed, and small decorative touches.

Other than picking the theme, the owners have no say in the design process and only get to see the results, not the progress of the build. The owners live for the week in a recreational vehicle parked in front of the house. If the owners are caught peeking at the construction, they are "penalized" by Watson in the form of a practical joke. If the builders fail to meet the deadline, a separate group of "superstar" builders is brought in to complete the effort.

The show has two interesting facets: the outlandish designs and the interactions between the builders. The workers occasionally have personality conflicts. Toward the end of the week, fatigue increases tempers, especially if the build is not going well.

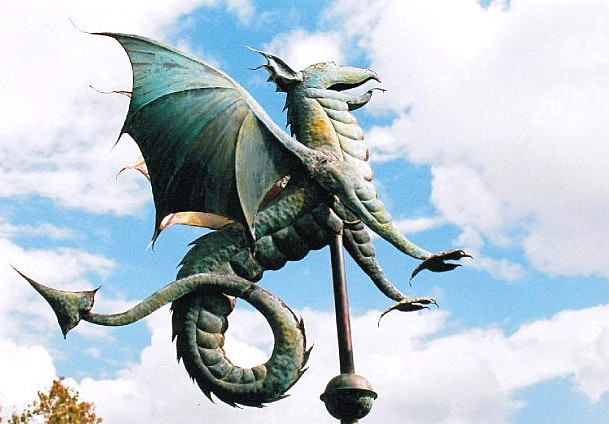
"Envy, War, Pestilence." A wyvern weather vane that appeared in the Viking House episode

Most builds were completed in the allotted times, usually finishing near midnight on Fridays. Some builds, however, were accomplished far more quickly. During the "Zen House", the build team finished so quickly that they could assist the interior decorators and have the family moved in on Friday night. The "Shark House" build was actually finished by Thursday afternoon, but specialty builds and decorations weren't scheduled until that Saturday, so the build was still officially completed on Saturday. On at least two on-camera occasions, the build was not completed on time by the original team, while other episodes showed builders bowing to pressure and leaving the set during construction. The show allowed some of these builders to redeem themselves during a special "Dog House" two-part episode. A married couple had requested the show to build a large doghouse in their back yard for their thre large dogs. The production brought back five failed builders (since they were, metaphorically, "in the doghouse" with the show) to do the build. This time around, the builders were finally successful.

The show originally only remodeled residential houses, but in the third season, expanded to public buildings such as a teachers' lounge of a school, a fire station kitchen, and a police station break room. During the final season, the series regularly employed product placement by including a bald actor portraying advertising mascot Mr. Clean who would stand around during the last-minute cleanup jobs and nod approvingly.

== Episodes ==
In all, sixty houses or other buildings were remodeled over 3 seasons. Six episodes have been produced under the "Monster House: Revisited" banner; these episodes were just re-runs of the original episode with an added interview of the homeowners some time after the build was completed. The first episode "Race Car House" premiered June 2, 2003, and the final episode "Farewell House" was aired on February 27, 2006.

Some examples of themes were "Outback House" which had projects like an Uluru-shaped couch made in foam, and the "New York House" where a steel dining table was shaped like the main span of the Triborough Bridge.

Season	Episodes	Originally released	
Season	Episodes	First released	Last released
1	13	June 2, 2003	October 27, 2003
2	16	November 17, 2003	July 26, 2004
3	19	August 2, 2004	June 10, 2005
4	11	August 12, 2005	February 27, 2006
Special		April 6, 2007	

== International broadcasts ==
In Australia, Monster House currently airs on the Seven Network's free-to-air digital channel 7mate at approximately 11.30am Saturday mornings.

In China, Monster House currently airs on the RTS's ICS at 7.00pm from Monday to Friday.

In Italy, Monster House currently airs on Real Time at 5.20pm.

== See also ==
- Monster Garage
