= Makeover reality television series =

Television genre

Makeover reality television series are television series which focus on makeovers.

Long an element of daytime talk shows, they have recently moved into the limelight in television shows such as Queer Eye. Other popular makeover shows include What Not to Wear, Extreme Makeover, Ambush Makeover, Snog Marry Avoid? and Pimp My Ride.
