= Hildi Santo-Tomas =

American interior designer and television personality

- Born: April 4, 1961 (age 65); Raleigh, North Carolina, U.S.
- Education: University of North Carolina at Chapel Hill
- Occupations: Interior designer; television personality
- Known for: Trading Spaces (2000–2008, 2018–2019)

Hildi Santo-Tomas (born April 4, 1961) is an American interior designer and television personality. She is best known for being a designer on the TLC reality program Trading Spaces from 2000 to 2008, where she became known for her outlandish and often unpopular designs.

== Life and career ==
Hildi Santo-Tomas was born on April 4, 1961, (Note: Per an article in ET Online and a post on Genevieve Gorder's Instagram page, Santo-Tomas's 59th birthday was on April 4, 2020.) in Raleigh, North Carolina, where she grew up. After graduating from the University of North Carolina at Chapel Hill with a business degree, she found work as a financial planner and as a stockbroker.

In the late 1980s, Santo-Tomas became a designer. She joined the cast of Trading Spaces, a home makeover reality program in which neighbors redesign a room in each other's homes with the help of an interior designer, on the show's second episode in October 2000 and appeared in 40 episodes. During her time on the show, Santo-Tomas was known for her outlandish designs. The show's popularity in its second season was attributed by Kim Reed of MSNBC to the "astoundingly horrendous" designs of Santo-Tomas and fellow designer Doug Wilson. These designs included putting a mural of her own face in a dining room, gluing hay on the walls of a living room, stapling thousands of silk flowers to the walls of a bathroom, pouring sand into a room to imitate a cabana, covering a kitchen with wine labels, and fastening the furniture in a living room to the ceiling to make it appear upside down. They were often heavily disliked by fans, who frequently criticized her on message boards, and several critics have listed her designs as the worst on the show.

NPR's Linda Holmes wrote that Santo-Tomas was "notorious" for "wacky concepts that not only weren't attractive, but often seemed likely to damage the room" while on the show. Good Housekeeping's Lauren Smith McDonough stated that she was likely the most memorable designer on the show for viewers due to "her controversial decisions and comfort in straying from safe designs". Curbed's Michael Ward described Santo-Tomas as a queer icon for her "camp sensibility" and for "never waver[ing] in the face of mockery or scorn". For Entertainment Weekly, Mary Sollosi ranked Santo-Tomas as both the show's best and worst designer, writing that her designs "merit the last placement", but adding that she delivered the thrill and imagination that "we all watch Trading Spaces for".

In 2018, Santo-Tomas starred in the reboot of Trading Spaces on TLC. As of 2018, she is on the school board at the Savannah College of Art and Design.
