= Steve Watson (actor) =

American actor (born 1972)

Steve Watson (born June 11, 1972) is an American actor. He is best known for his role as the host of Discovery Channel's reality program Monster House (2003–2006). He appeared on Ice Road Truckers during the "after" special and served as host of HGTV's Don't Sweat It (2006–2011).
