= Ty Pennington =

American television host

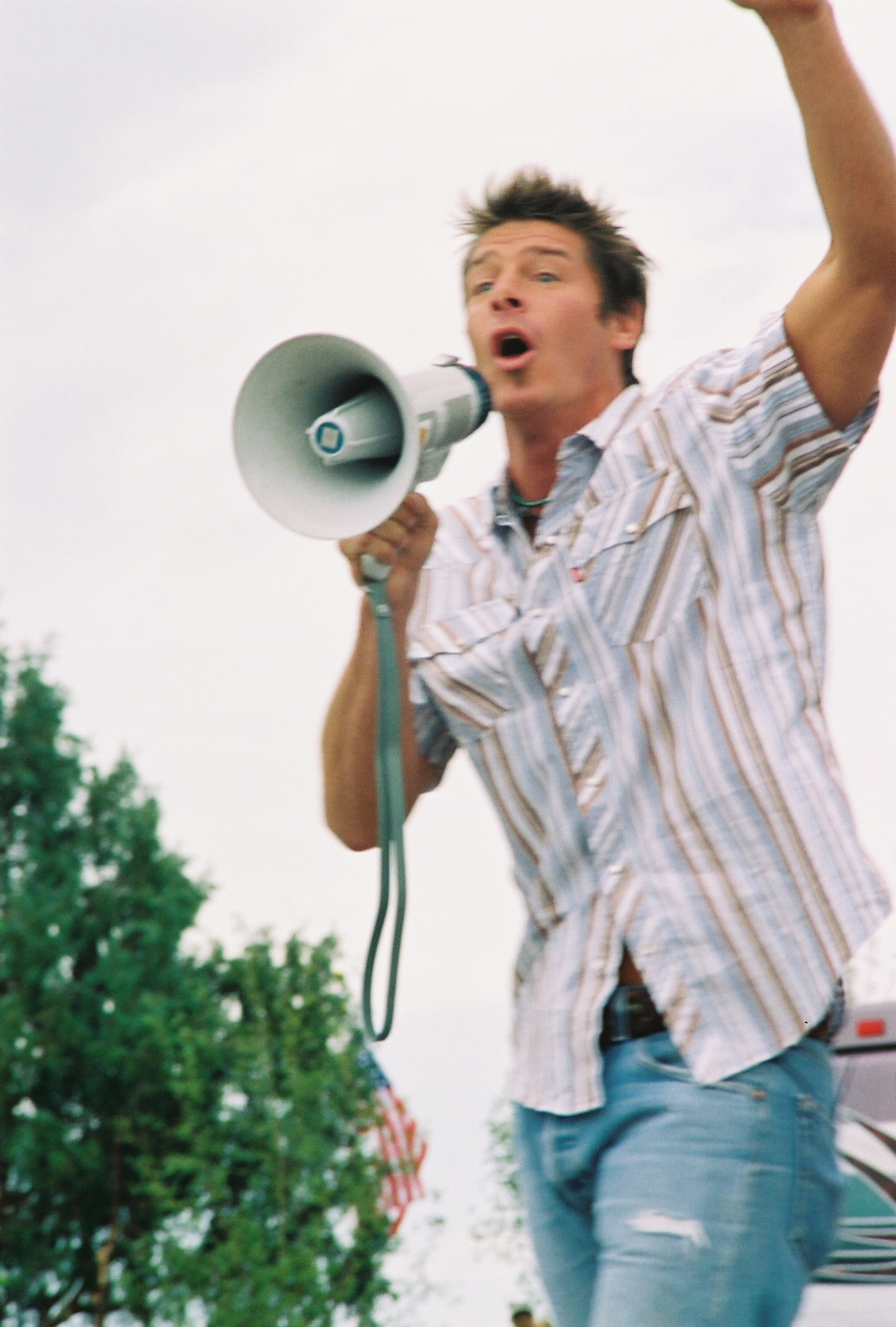
- Pennington in 2006
- Born: Gary Tygert Burton; October 19, 1964 (age 61); Atlanta, Georgia, U.S.
- Occupations: TV host/presenter, artist, author
- Years active: 1995–present
- Spouse: Kellee Merrell (m. 2021)
- Website: http://www.typennington.com

Tygert Burton "Ty" Pennington (born Gary Tygert Burton; October 19, 1964) is an American television host, artist, carpenter, author, former model and actor.

His rise to prominence began with his role as carpenter on the TLC home improvement reality show Trading Spaces (2000–2003), and continued when he hosted the ABC reality series Extreme Makeover: Home Edition (2003–2012), where he won two Primetime Emmy Awards. Following the show's conclusion in 2012, Pennington has focused on numerous other projects, including host of ABC's short lived talk show The Revolution in 2012, TNT's On the Menu opposite Emeril Lagasse in 2014 and Food Network's American Diner Revival opposite Amanda Freitag from 2015 to 2016. On September 13, 2017, it was announced that Pennington was joining the revival of Trading Spaces, which began airing on April 7, 2018, on TLC.

== Early life ==
Pennington was born Gary Tygert Burton, the son of Yvonne Vickery. Yvonne separated from Ty's father when he and his older brother Wynn were very young, and spent several years as a single parent before she remarried. Her new husband adopted both boys, giving them his surname Pennington. Ty claims to be of partial Cherokee descent.

=== Education ===
A self-described "Jack of all trades", Pennington learned woodworking early in life and began teaching himself about carpentry and home improvement. After attending Sprayberry High School in Marietta, Georgia, he first attended Kennesaw State University, where he majored in art and history. He paid his way through college by taking night classes and working during the day, first working in landscaping before moving into construction. Despite his skills in carpentry, Pennington initially decided that carpentry wasn't something he wanted to do professionally, noting his main interests were in becoming an artist, specializing in Graphic Design. On the advice of one of his professors, he transferred to the Art Institute of Atlanta, from where he graduated with a bachelor's degree in graphic design.

== Career ==
=== Television ===
Pennington parlayed his hands-on skills and design acumen into a career in the entertainment industry, becoming a set designer, including for Leaving Las Vegas in 1995. In 2003, he acted in the independent film, The Adventures of Ociee Nash (as "Wilbur Wright"). However, his professional breakthrough came through The Learning Channel's (now known as simply TLC) innovative hit show Trading Spaces. In each episode, two sets of neighbors redecorated one room in each other's home. Both teams in early seasons shared one carpenter, while later on, each team had a carpenter. Pennington was featured as one of the show's original carpenters, and quickly became a show favorite.

In 2003, when ABC began developing a show that would rehab the homes of deserving families in seven days or less, Pennington was chosen as the leader of the eight-person design team. Extreme Makeover: Home Edition, originally planned to be a 13-part special, became a huge hit, catapulting Pennington to stardom. This led to an endorsement deal with Sears, a sponsor of the show. Pennington was extremely dedicated to the show, spending on average 240 days of the year working, and was known to have fought off anything from pulled muscles to heatstroke to food poisoning to keep doing his job. He stated that his career on the show resulted in the channel's commissioning Ty Pennington's Great British Adventure, in which he worked with communities including Portreath, Cornwall (UK) to restore a run-down town park in a week and Portishead, Somerset (UK) to renovate the town's derelict outdoor pool into a community-run Lido. The series was shown from September 16, 2008.

When Extreme Makeover: Home Edition ended in 2012 with its ninth season, Pennington had helped rebuild more than 200 homes for the show. Afterwards, Pennington relocated from Los Angeles to New York City, where he was cast to take part in the lifestyle-based talk show The Revolution, which aired on ABC in January 2012. When the show was cancelled after six months, Ty began pursuing other goals.

In January 2021, HGTV debuted Ty Breaker, a show that features Pennington helping families struggling to make their homes work for their changing lives.

Pennington joined the HGTV renovation competition series, Rock The Block, as host for its 2nd season, which premiered on March 8, 2021, and has continued in that role since. He is currently hosting the 5th season of the show, which premiered in March of 2024.

Pennington is also the host of HGTV show Battle on the Beach, a competition real estate show with 3 teams that renovate a beach home room by room, alongside Alison Victoria, and Taniya Nayak.

=== Other work ===
Prior to his partnership with Sears, Pennington was the owner and designer of his company, Furniture Unlimited, based in Atlanta and Los Angeles. He also lends his name to Sears, with their design team guiding the design of every item in the Ty Pennington Style line of bedding, tabletop items, bath accessories, furniture, patio furniture, and other miscellaneous home decor.

Pennington published Ty's Tricks: Home Repair Secrets Plus Cheap and Easy Projects to Transform Any Room (2003), a do-it-yourself guide on home improvement. On May 15, 2007, he released the first issue of his quarterly magazine Ty Pennington at Home, which ran until 2009.

On July 25, 2008, he announced a 3-year partnership with Marketplace Events, the largest organizer of consumer remodeling, home decor and gardening shows in North America.

He appeared on an episode of Wow! Wow! Wubbzy! playing a fictionalized version of himself named Ty Ty The Tool Guy.

In September 2008, Pennington became the spokesperson for Abbott Nutrition and their baby formula packaging innovation called Similac SimplePac. He was also involved with the Similac Custom Nursery Design Contest and Ty's Nursery Guide that were part of the new product marketing.

In September 2011, Pennington appeared in an episode of Disney's Take Two with Phineas and Ferb.

In February 2014, Pennington became the spokesperson for Guaranteed Rate and has been featured in a series of commercials and ads for the Chicago-based mortgage lender.

Since April 2024, Pennington is a brand ambassador for Karndean Designflooring.

=== ADHD ===
As a child, Pennington had behavioral problems until he was diagnosed with ADHD at the age of 17. He also discussed his ADHD with Glenn Beck and in the movie The Disruptors. Pennington has partnered with Shire plc to raise awareness of ADHD in adults and promote the use of Vyvanse for the treatment of adult ADHD. He has been criticized for promoting the use of ADHD medications such as Adderall without disclosing his sponsorship.

== Personal life ==
Pennington was arrested for a DUI in Los Angeles on May 5, 2007 with a blood alcohol content of .14 percent. He faced 6 months in jail. He pleaded guilty and was sentenced to 3 years probation.

In July 2021, Pennington announced his engagement to his girlfriend of one year, Kellee Merrell. They got married on November 27, 2021 in Savannah, Georgia.

== Books ==
- Good Design Can Change Your Life: Beautiful Rooms, Inspiring Stories, Simon & Schuster; (September 9, 2008); ISBN 978-0-7432-9474-4
- Ty's Tricks: Home Repair Secrets Plus Cheap and Easy Projects to Transform Any Room, Hyperion (2003); ISBN 978-1401300678

== See also ==
- Andy Kane - equivalent on Changing Rooms, the British forerunner of Trading Spaces
