= Changing Rooms =

British reality television series

- Created by: Peter Bazalgette; Ann Booth-Clibborn; Nick Vaughan-Barratt
- Presented by: Carol Smillie; Laurence Llewelyn-Bowen; Anna Richardson
- Theme music composer: Jim Parker
- Country of origin: United Kingdom
- Original language: English
- No. of series: 17 (BBC); 2 (Channel 4)
- No. of episodes: 165 (inc. specials) (BBC); 12 (Channel 4)

Production
- Running time: 30 minutes (original); 60 minutes (revival)
- Production companies: Bazal (1996–2002); Endemol UK Productions (2002–2004); Shine TV (2021–2022)

Original release
- Network: BBC Two (1996–1997); BBC One (1998–2004)
- Release: 4 September 1996 – 28 December 2004
- Network: Channel 4
- Release: 18 August 2021 – 14 September 2022

Related
- DIY SOS; 60 Minute Makeover

Changing Rooms is a do-it-yourself home improvement show broadcast in the United Kingdom on the BBC between 1996 and 2004. The series was revived on Channel 4 in 2021.

The show was one of a number of home improvement and lifestyle shows popular in the late 1990s and early 2000s. The show was later franchised, generally under the same name, for the local TV markets in the United States, New Zealand and Australia.

== Format ==
The premise of the show was for couples to swap houses with friends or neighbours with each pair decorating one room in each other's homes. This leads up to a finale with both couples seeing their rooms, and meeting up again – almost invariably on still friendly terms. With the show including some top designers, their ideas could be a little over the top, which led to a few tears and tantrums.

== History ==
The show began on BBC Two, at 9 pm on 4 September 1996, before transferring to BBC One for the start of the third series in 1998. The final edition was broadcast on 22 November 2004 after a successful 8-year, 17 series run. The cancellation was announced on 27 August 2004.

Changing Rooms was originally hosted by Carol Smillie, and assisting with the remodelling was a Cockney carpenter, "Handy" Andy Kane. The former designer on the show, Laurence Llewelyn-Bowen, took over presenting the show from Smillie in 2003 for series 14 and 15. "Handy" Andy went on to host his own DIY shows.

In November 2004, a special episode was taped in Boscastle, Cornwall, for Christmas broadcast. Designers Anna Ryder Richardson, Graham Wynne and Gordon Whistance took on the task of restoring the decor of homes and businesses damaged in the floods of August that year. The episode was broadcast on 28 December 2004.

In October 2020, Channel 4 announced that it would be reviving the show, with Llewelyn-Bowen returning as presenter alongside Davina McCall. On 22 March 2021, it was confirmed that McCall would not present the revived series due to scheduling conflicts and the delayed filming of the show as a result of coronavirus restrictions. On 5 May 2021, Anna Richardson was confirmed as McCall's replacement.

== Designers ==
The designers on the original version during its run included Linda Barker, Laurence Llewelyn-Bowen and Anna Ryder Richardson.

== International versions ==
The show has been franchised and variations of it appear in several other countries, sometimes with a different name – such as Trading Spaces in United States. The original Changing Rooms is also broadcast overseas, for example, on BBC America and featured in various US shows, the Sex and the City episode "Lights, Camera, Relationship" being one example.

A New Zealand edition of the show was produced for several years, also called Changing Rooms. It was identically formatted to the British series, with host Kerry Smith, "Handy" Andy Dye, and regular designers including Donald Grant Sunderland, Neil McLachlan and Sally Ridge. A handful of international shows were produced, each featuring one couple in New Zealand and one in the United Kingdom.

Australia's Nine Network also produced a local version of Changing Rooms from 1998 to 2005, hosted by Suzie Wilks who was assisted by Peter Everett, James Lindsay, Catherine Morton and Tim Janenko-Panaeff.

In the Netherlands, a Dutch version – In Holland staat een huis – was broadcast by RTL 4 from 1998 to 2006, hosted by Martijn Krabbé.

== Transmission guide ==
=== Original series ===
Series	Start date	End date	Episodes
1	4 September 1996	9 October 1996	6
2	28 July 1997	22 September 1997	8
3	10 March 1998	14 April 1998	6
4	16 July 1998	16 September 1998	10
5	6 January 1999	3 March 1999	8
6	6 September 1999	20 December 1999	10
7	5 May 2000	9 June 2000	6
8	4 September 2000	13 November 2000	9
9	27 November 2000	3 May 2001	11
10	11 September 2001	22 October 2001	7
11	25 February 2002	10 August 2002	13
12	26 August 2002	7 November 2002	8
13	3 April 2003	14 July 2003	12
14	15 September 2003	15 December 2003	13
15	5 January 2004	23 February 2004	7
16	19 April 2004	14 June 2004	8
17	9 August 2004	22 November 2004	12

=== Revived series ===
Series	Start date	End date	Episodes
1	18 August 2021	22 September 2021	6
2	10 August 2022	14 September 2022	6

=== Specials ===
Entitle	Air Date
Series 1 Highlights	30 December 1996
Changing Rooms Stripped Bare	5 December 1998
Christmas Special: Arran	25 December 1998
Redecorated	2 April 1999
The World of Changing Rooms	30 August 1999
A Morning with Changing Rooms	13 December 1999
Tenerife	27 December 1999
When Changing Rooms Met Ground Force	13 February 2000
When Changing Rooms Met The Navy	2 September 2000
When Changing Rooms Met Ground Force 2	24 October 2000
Boscastle Christmas Special	28 December 2004
