= Douglas Wilson (interior designer) =

American interior designer

Doug Wilson is an American interior designer. He is best known for appearing as an interior designer on Trading Spaces. He is the former host of Moving Up, which also airs on TLC. He is a graduate of the University of Illinois at Urbana-Champaign.

On the show, Wilson is known for his flamboyant and confrontational manner and for sometimes completely disregarding the homeowner's wishes. On one occasion, Wilson redesigned a bedroom to resemble a prison cell, complete with a mural depicting prisoners. On several occasions, his designs have reduced the homeowners to tears. Wilson has said that he is there to make an interesting, entertaining show, and the homeowner's wishes are secondary.

In private practice, Wilson has collaborated with such interior designers as Albert Hadley and Alexa Hampton. Clients include Brooke Astor, Michael Bloomberg, and Barbara Walters. His work has been covered by many magazines and newspapers.

In addition to Trading Spaces, Wilson has hosted two other shows on TLC, Moving Up and America's Ugliest Rooms.

Wilson is the author of a guide to home interior design, Doug's Rooms: Transforming Your Space One Room at a Time.

Wilson also owned a small fine dining steakhouse in Sullivan, Illinois known as "Doug Wilson's Jibby's", which closed for business on August 25, 2011.
