= List of programs broadcast by HGTV =

HGTV television programs

The following is a list of television programs formerly or currently broadcast by HGTV.

== Current programming ==
- House Hunters (1999–present)
- House Hunters International (2006–present)
- Love It or List It (2011–present)
- My Lottery Dream Home (2015–present)
- Home Town (2016–present)
- Fixer to Fabulous (2017–present)
- Rock the Block (2019–present)
- 100 Day Dream Home (2020–present)
- Celebrity IOU (2020–present)
- Help! I Wrecked My House (2020–present)
- Battle on the Beach (2021–present)
- Ugliest House in America (2022–present)
- Renovation Resort Showdown (2023–present)
- Renovation Aloha (2024–present)
- Zillow Gone Wild (2024–present)
- Scariest House in America (2024–present)
- Don't Hate Your House with the Property Brothers (2024–present)
- The Flip Off (2025–present)
- Castle Impossible (2025–present)
- Sin City Rehab (2025–present)
- Hoarding for the Holidays (2025–present)
- Holmes on Homes: Building a Legacy (2025–present)
- Cheap A$$ Beach Houses (2025–present)
- Junk or Jackpot? (2025–present)
- Neighborhood Watch (2026–present)
- Bachelor Mansion Takeover (2026–present)
- Wild Vacation Rentals (2026–present)
- Property Brothers: Under Pressure (2026–present)
- World's Bargain Dream Homes (2026–present)
- Tropic Like It's Hot (2026–present)
- Home Town: Inn This Together (2026–present)
- Crashers (2026–present)
- Worst Yard on the Block (2026–present)
- Maine Cabin Masters: All Inn (2026–present)
- Extreme Buyers Club (2026–present)
- Roast My Rental (2026–present)
- Totally '90s House (2026–present)
- Botched Homes (2026–present)
- A Very Haunted Renovation (2026–present)
- House Shock (2026–present)

=== Specials ===
- HGTV Dream Home (1997–present)
- HGTV Urban Oasis (2010–present)
- HGTV Smart Home (2013–present)

== Former programming ==
- Room by Room (1994–2006)
- The Carol Duvall Show (1994–2005)
- Gardening by the Yard (1996–2009)
- Surprise Gardener (1998–2003)
- Designing for the Sexes (1998–2011)
- Decorating Cents (1997–2008)
- Homes Across America (2000s)
- Savoir Faire (late 1990s–2000)
- This Small Space (2000s?)
- If Walls Could Talk (2000–13)
- Curb Appeal (1999–2013)
- Dream House (2000–08)
- Designers' Challenge (2001–09)
- Ultimate Collectors (2002–03)
- The Collector Inspector (2002-04)
- Landscapers' Challenge (2002–08)
- Design on a Dime (2003–13)
- Divine Design (2003–11)
- Holmes on Homes (2004–10)
- Designed to Sell (2004–11)
- FreeStyle (2005–13)
- My First Place (2005–13)
- Creative Juice (2006–08)
- Hidden Potential (2006–09; 2017–20)
- Over Your Head (2006–11)
- Don't Sweat It (2006–11)
- HGTV Star (2006–13)
- Property Virgins (2006–16)
- Deserving Design (2007)
- Bought & Sold (2007–09)
- Living with Ed (2007–09, moved to Planet Green)
- Color Splash (2007–12)
- Get Color (2007–12)
- The Stagers (2008–09)
- Myles of Style (2008–09)
- HGTV Showdown (2008–09)
- House Detective (2008–12)
- HGTV Green Home (2008–2010)
- Desperate to Buy (2009)
- The Property Shop (2009)
- The Unsellables (2009)
- Leader of the Pack (2009)
- HGTV's $250,000 Challenge (2009)
- Man Land (2009)
- For Rent (2009–11)
- Bang for Your Buck (2009–11)
- Dear Genevieve (2009–12)
- Real Estate Intervention (2009–13)
- Home Rules (2010)
- Marriage Under Construction (2010)
- My First Sale (2010)
- Tough as Nails (2010)
- The Antonio Treatment (2010–11)
- The Outdoor Room with Jamie Durie (2010–11)
- Curb Appeal: The Block (2010–12)
- Million Dollar Rooms (2010–12)
- All American Handyman (2010–12)
- Holmes Inspection (2010–12)
- Selling New York (2010–14)
- Candice Tells All (2011)
- Cash & Cari (2011)
- Secrets from a Stylist (2011)
- Sarah's Summer House (2011)
- HGTV'd (2011)
- Run My Makeover (2011)
- Showhouse Showdown (2011)
- House Hunters on Vacation (2011–12)
- My Yard Goes Disney (2011–12)
- Home by Novogratz (2011–12)
- Kitchen Cousins (2011–12)
- Donna Decorates Dallas (2011–12)
- Dina's Party (2011–12)
- Mom Caves (2011–12)
- Interiors Inc. (2011–12)
- HGTV's Great Rooms (2011–12)
- My First Renovation (2011–12)
- My House, Your Money (2011–12)
- Weekends With Luis (2011–12)
- Design Wars (2011–12)
- Room Crashers (2011–13)
- The High Low Project (2011–13)
- Beyond Spelling Manor (2011–13)
- Selling LA (2011–14)
- Property Brothers (2011–19)
- Price This Place (2012)
- Living Abroad (2012)
- White Room Challenge (2012)
- Selling London (2012)
- Natural Born Sellers (2012)
- HGTV Design Star All Stars (2012)
- Shop This Room (2012)
- Making House (2012)
- Flea Market Flip (2012–13, moved to Great American Country)
- Celebrity at Home (2012–13)
- You Live in What? (2012–13)
- Elbow Room (2012–13)
- Home Strange Home (2012–13)
- Going Yard (2012–14)
- Extreme Homes (2012–15)
- Buying and Selling (2012–19)
- House Hunters Renovation (2012–20; 2023–24)
- Cousins on Call (2013)
- West End Salvage (2013)
- Staged to Perfection (2013)
- Renovate to Rent (2013)
- Catastrophe Inc. (2013)
- Power Broker (2013)
- Rent or Buy (2013)
- Scoring the Deal (2013–14)
- Flip It to Win It (2013–14)
- Cousins Undercover (2013–14)
- Renovation Raiders (2013–15)
- Sold on the Spot (2013–15)
- House Hunters International Renovation (2013–16)
- Fixer Upper (2013–18)
- Love It or List It, Too (2013–19)
- Hawaii Life (2013–21)
- Island Hunters (2013–21)
- Flip or Flop (2013–22)
- Beachfront Bargain Hunt (2013–22)
- Brother vs. Brother (2013–23)
- Beat the House (2014)
- Brian Boitano Project (2014)
- Flipping the Block (2014)
- My Big Family Renovation (2014)
- The Jennie Garth Project (2014)
- A Sale of Two Cities (2014–15)
- House Hunters Off the Grid (2014–15)
- Vacation House for Free (2014–16)
- Living Big Sky (2014–16)
- Property Brothers At Home (2014–17)
- Tiny House Hunters (2014–17)
- Log Cabin Living (2014–19)
- Caribbean Life (2014–20)
- Lakefront Bargain Hunt (2014–21)
- Rehab Addict (2014–15; 2025)
- Half-Price Paradise (2015)
- Mark & Derek's Excellent Flip (2015)
- Flipping the Heartland (2015)
- Beach Flip (2015)
- Flip or Flop Follow-Up (2015)
- Rehab Addict: Detroit (2015)
- Build Small, Live Anywhere (2015)
- Ellen's Design Challenge (2015–16)
- Five Day Flip (2015–16)
- Hunting Vintage (2015–16)
- America's Most Desperate Kitchens (2015–16)
- Vintage Flip (2015–17)
- Listed Sisters (2015–18)
- Flipping Virgins (2015–18)
- Island Life (2015–22)
- Masters of Flip (2016)
- Good Bones (2016-24)
- Container Homes (2016)
- Welcome Back Potter (2016)
- Brothers Take New Orleans (2016)
- We Bought the Farm (2016–17)
- Desert Flippers (2016–18)
- House Hunters Family (2016–18)
- Mountain Life (2016–18)
- Rustic Rehab (2016–18)
- Flip or Flop Atlanta (2016–18)
- Flip or Flop Vegas (2016–19)
- Restored by the Fords (2016–19)
- Beach Hunters (2016–21)
- Mexico Life (2016–22)
- House Hunters Outside the Box (2017)
- Flip or Flop Fort Worth (2017–18)
- Fixer Upper Behind the Design (2017–18)
- Tiny Paradise (2017–18)
- Best House on the Block (2017–18)
- Boise Boys (2017–19)
- How Close Can I Beach? (2017–19)
- Mom & Me (2017–19)
- Mountain Mamas (2017–19)
- My House Is Your House (2017–19)
- Mediterranean Life (2017–21)
- Music City Fix (2018)
- My Aloha Dream Home (2018)
- Flip or Flop Nashville (2018–19)
- Bahamas Life (2018–20)
- Should I Stay or Go? (2018–20)
- Hot Properties: San Diego (2018–20)
- Say Yes to the Nest (2019)
- Roommate Hunters (2019)
- What You Get for Your Money (2019)
- City vs. Burbs (2019)
- Best. Pool. Ever. (2019)
- Pool Hunters (2019)
- Supersize My Pool (2019)
- My First Place (2019)
- Going for Sold (2019)
- Hawaii Hunters (2019)
- A Very Brady Renovation (2019)
- Off the Grid on the Beach (2019–20)
- One of a Kind (2019–20)
- Build Me Up (2019–20)
- Jungle Life (2019–20)
- Property Brothers: Forever Home (2019–23)
- Unsellable Houses (2019–24)
- Windy City Rehab (2019–24)
- Christina on the Coast (2019–25)
- Bargain Mansions (2020, moved to DIY Network)
- Nate and Jeremiah: Save My House (2020)
- Extreme Makeover: Home Edition (2020)
- Crowded House (2020)
- My Lottery Dream House International (2020)
- Design at Your Door (2020)
- Generation Renovation: Lake House (2020)
- Making It Home With Kortney & Dave (2020)
- Martha Knows Best (2020)
- Backyard Takeover (2020)
- Renovation, Inc. (2020)
- Bizarre Builds (2020)
- My Big Italian Adventure (2020)
- Biggest Little Christmas Showdown (2020)
- Self-Made Mansions (2020–21)
- House in a Hurry (2020–21)
- Hot Mess House (2020–21)
- Flipping Across America (2020–21)
- Escape to the Chateau (2020–21)
- Beach Around the World (2020–22)
- Renovation Island (2020–22)
- Selling the Big Easy (2020–22)
- Vacation House Rules (2020–25)
- Ty Breaker (2021)
- Rehab Addict Rescue (2021)
- Home Again with the Fords (2021)
- $50K Three Ways (2021)
- Happily Wherever (2021)
- Breaking Bland (2021)
- Cash in the Attic (2021)
- Cheap Old Houses (2021)
- Renovation, Inc: The Lake House (2021)
- Curb Appeal Xtreme (2021)
- Outgrown (2021)
- Flipping 101 w/ Tarek El Moussa (2021–25)
- Flipping Showdown (2021)
- Call the Closer (2021)
- Two Steps Home (2021–22)
- Inside Out (2021–22)
- Everything But the House (2021–22, moved to Lifetime)
- Houses with History (2021–23)
- The Nate & Jeremiah Home Project (2021–23)
- No Demo Reno (2021–23)
- Tough Love with Hilary Farr (2021–23)
- Farmhouse Fixer (2021–24)
- Home Town Takeover (2021–25)
- Bargain Block (2021–25)
- Holmes Family Rescue (2021–25)
- Renovation Goldmine (2022)
- Saving the Manor (2022)
- Unfinished Business (2022)
- Moving for Love (2022)
- Home Inspector Joe (2022)
- Fixer to Fabulous: Welcome Inn (2022)
- Mash-Up Our Home (2022)
- I Bought a Dump… Now What? (2022)
- Home Town Kickstart Presented by People (2022)
- Buy It or Build It (2022)
- The Great Giveback with Melissa McCarthy and Jenna Perusich (2022)
- Steal This House (2022)
- Flip to a Million (2022)
- Good Bones: Risky Business (2022)
- Renovation Impossible (2022)
- Rehab Addict Lake House Rescue (2022)
- Renovation Face-Off (2022)
- First Home Fix (2022)
- Battle of the Bling (2022)
- The Renovator (2022–23)
- Luxe for Less (2022–23)
- Fix My Flip (2022–23)
- Build It Forward (2022–23)
- Building Roots (2022–23)
- Why the Heck Did I Buy This House? (2022–24)
- Lil Jon Wants to Do What? (2022–24)
- Married to Real Estate (2022–25)
- Home in a Heartbeat (2023)
- Renovation Wild (2023)
- Flip the Strip (2023)
- Renovation 911 (2023)
- Windy City Rehab: Alison's Dream Home (2023)
- Revealed (2023)
- Barbie Dreamhouse Challenge (2023)
- What's Wrong With That House? (2023)
- Christina in the Country (2023–24)
- Rico to the Rescue (2023–24)
- The Flipping El Moussas (2023–25)
- Fix My Frankenhouse (2023–25)
- Down Home Fab (2023–25)
- Battle on the Mountain (2024)
- Fixer to Fabulous: Italiano (2024)
- Small Town Potential (2024)
- Lakefront Empire (2024)
- House Hunters: All Stars (2024)
- Who's Afraid of a Cheap Old House? (2024)
- Farmhouse Fixer Camp Revamp (2024)
- Beach Bargains (2024)
- Backed by the Bros (2024)
- 100 Day Hotel Challenge (2024)
- Bargain Block New Orleans (2024)
- Divided by Design (2024–25)
- Izzy Does It (2025)
- Fixer Upper: Colorado Mountain House (2025)
- Betting on Paradise (2025)
- Chasing the West (2025)
