= Flip or Flop Fort Worth =

American reality television series

- Genre: Reality television
- Country of origin: United States
- Original language: English
- No. of seasons: 1
- No. of episodes: 10

Production
- Running time: 30 minutes

Original release
- Network: HGTV
- Release: November 2, 2017 – January 11, 2018

Related
- Flip or Flop (franchise)

Flip or Flop Fort Worth is a television series airing on HGTV hosted by real estate agents Andy and Ashley Williams. It is a spin-off of the HGTV series Flip or Flop. It premiered on November 2, 2017 and takes place in the Dallas-Fort Worth Metroplex, primarily in Fort Worth.

== Premise ==
On March 1, 2017, HGTV announced that Flip or Flop" would expand to Texas. The show features couple Andy and Ashley Williams as they flip houses in Fort Worth. Andy and Ashley Williams follow the same roles as Tarek and Christina, the couple from the original Flip or Flop, on this show.

Andy and Ashley Williams previously hosted a show on HGTV named Flipping Texas, a pilot show.

== Hosts ==
Andy and Ashley Williams are military veterans who became real estate investors. They buy, rehab and sell houses all over Texas.

== Episodes ==
No. overall	No. in season	Title	Original air date	Cost of home ($)	Closing cost ($)	Rehab cost ($)	Sale price ($)	Profit/loss ($)	Contractor
1	1	"A Cozy Cottage Flip in Arlington Heights"	November 2, 2017	TBA	TBA	TBA	TBA	TBA	TBA
Flip location: Arlington Heights, Fort Worth, Texas
2	2	"Foundation for a Flip"	November 9, 2017	TBA	TBA	TBA	TBA	TBA	TBA
Flip location: Hurst, Texas
3	3	"Pulling out a Paycheck"	November 16, 2017	TBA	TBA	TBA	TBA	TBA	TBA
Flip location: Fort Worth, Texas
4	4	"A Modern Ranch Flip in Hurst, Texas"	February 23, 2017	TBA	TBA	TBA	TBA	TBA	TBA
Flip location: Hurst, Texas
5	5	"Rat Freeway"	November 30, 2017	TBA	TBA	TBA	TBA	TBA	TBA
Flip location: Hurst, Texas
6	6	"Welcome to the Jungle"	December 7, 2017	TBA	TBA	TBA	TBA	TBA	TBA
Flip location: Fort Worth, Texas
7	7	"Textbook Flip or Flop"	December 14, 2017	TBA	TBA	TBA	TBA	TBA	TBA
Flip location: Benbrook, Texas
8	8	"Texas-Style Cape Cod Cottage"	December 21, 2017	TBA	TBA	TBA	TBA	TBA	TBA
Flip location: Arlington Heights, Fort Worth, Texas
9	9	"Punch in the Wallet"	January 4, 2018	TBA	TBA	TBA	TBA	TBA	TBA
Flip location: River Oaks, Texas
10	10	"Leaking Pipes Equals Leaking Money"	January 11, 2018	TBA	TBA	TBA	TBA	TBA	TBA
Flip location: Watauga, Texas
