= List of Flip or Flop episodes =

Episodes of American reality television series Flip or Flop

Flip or Flop is a television series airing on HGTV hosted by real estate investors Tarek El Moussa and Christina Haack, who were formerly married until 2017.

== Series overview ==
Season	Episodes	Originally released	
Season	Episodes	First released	Last released
1	13	April 16, 2013	May 28, 2013
2	14	April 8, 2014	July 8, 2014
3	15	October 7, 2014	July 7, 2015
4	15	December 3, 2015	March 24, 2016
5	15	June 9, 2016	September 22, 2016
6	15	December 1, 2016	March 30, 2017
7	20	June 15, 2017	September 6, 2018
8	18	August 1, 2019	December 12, 2019
9	15	October 15, 2020	February 18, 2021
10	15	December 2, 2021	March 17, 2022
From Rags to Riches	4	September 13, 2018	October 4, 2018

== Episodes ==
=== Season 1 ===
No. overall	No. in season	Title	Original air date	Cost of home ($)	Closing cost ($)	Rehab cost ($)	Sale price ($)	Profit/loss ($)	Contractor
1	1	"The Foreclosure Heebie-Jeebies"	April 16, 2013	275,000	22,000	53,000	405,000	+ 55,000	Daniel Messina
Flip location: Long Beach, California
2	2	"Vandalized Foreclosure"	April 16, 2013	430,000	26,000	29,000	560,000	+ 65,000	Daniel Messina
Flip location: Anaheim Hills, California
3	3	"Awkward Floor Plan"	April 23, 2013	393,000	N/A	37,387	510,000	+ 39,806.50	Daniel Messina
Flip location: Yorba Linda, California; Note: All costs and profits on this flip were split 50/50 with Pete de Best. The total profit was 79,613.
4	4	"Double Trouble Flip"	April 23, 2013	280,000	N/A	117,000	512,000	+ 115,000	Daniel Messina
Flip location: Garden Grove, California; Note: All costs and profits on this flip were split 50/50 with Pete de Best.
5	5	"Underwater Flip"	April 30, 2013	490,000	TBA	98,900	675,000	+ 86,100	Israel Battres
Flip location: Cypress, California
6	6	"Spanish Style Salvage"	April 30, 2013	208,000	20,600	57,935	360,000	+ 73,465	Daniel Messina
Flip location: Santa Ana, California
7	7	"Inland Empire Cosmetic Nightmare"	May 7, 2013	180,000	12,000	53,200	290,000	+ 44,800	Daniel Messina
Flip location: Ontario, California
8	8	"The Bungalow Gamble"	May 7, 2013	182,000	20,600	53,000	320,000	+ 66,200	Daniel Messina
Flip location: Whittier, California
9	9	"Flop House Flip"	May 14, 2013	210,000	17,500	83,000	368,500	+ 58,000	Israel Battres
Flip location: La Mirada, California
10	10	"Facelift Flip"	May 14, 2013	200,000	13,000	46,000	330,000	+ 71,000	Israel Battres
Flip location: Ontario, California
11	11	"A Flip With A View"	May 21, 2013	540,000	N/A	72,000	672,000	+ 59,974	Israel Battres
Flip location: Whittier, California; Note: Tarek and Christina had to borrow against Dominique's (Tarek's mother) home equity line of credit in order to fund the renovation. During the Flip or Flop Follow Up "High Risk, High Reward?" episode, it was revealed that they made $59,974 profit on the house.
12	12	"The Moldy Mess"	May 21, 2013	385,000	25,000	66,000	530,000	+ 54,000	Israel Battres
Flip location: Bellflower, California
13	13	"Keeping Up With The Joneses"	May 28, 2013	386,000	N/A	169,000	738,500	N/A	Israel Battres
Flip location: Fullerton, California; Note: No closing costs annotated on realtor.com, only house selling price by "Tarek El Moussa"

=== Season 2 ===
No. overall	No. in season	Title	Original air date	Cost of home ($)	Closing cost ($)	Rehab cost ($)	Sale price ($)	Profit/loss ($)	Contractor
14	1	"Foreclosure Shock"	April 8, 2014	410,000	35,000	123,000	685,000	+ 117,000	Israel Battres
Flip location: Glassell Park, California
15	2	"Unfinished Flip"	April 15, 2014	315,000	25,000	75,000	510,000	+ 95,000	Israel Battres
Flip location: Lakewood, California
16	3	"Nothing But Potential"	April 22, 2014	406,000	30,000	174,700	700,000	+ 89,300	Israel Battres
Flip location: North Tustin, California
17	4	"Too Small to Fail"	April 29, 2014; Parents Loan >	275,000; 15,000	22,000	42,750	420,000	+ 62,250	Israel Battres
Flip location: Whittier, California
18	5	"Dirty, Dated and Undesired"	May 6, 2014	330,000	20,000	60,000	500,000	+ 90,000	Israel Battres
Flip location: Garden Grove, California
19	6	"Flipper vs. Flipper"	May 13, 2014	680,000	51,300	80,700	880,000	9,700	Israel Battres
Flip location: Anaheim Hills, California; Note: The initial profit was $34,000. However, during Flip or Flop Follow Up, it was revealed that there was a $30,000 property lien on the house. After paying this and $13,700 in carrying costs, they lost $9,700.
20	7	"A Barnyard Dance"	May 20, 2014	565,000	N/A	103,100	715,000	+ 46,900	Israel Battres
Flip location: Torrance, California; Note: During the Flip or Flop Follow Up "Taking Risks" episode, it was revealed that this house sold for $715,000 for a profit of $46,900.
21	8	"Hard Money Blues"	May 27, 2014; Hard Money Loan >	625,000; 25,600	40,000	168,000	940,000	+ 81,400	Israel Battres
Flip location: Whittier, California; Note: During Flip or Flop Follow Up, it was revealed that the initial offer fell through and the home took 4 months to sell. With a sale price of $940k, total investment of $848k, closing and loan costs of $72,400, the profit was $19,600.
22	9	"Loud, Louder, Loudest"	June 3, 2014	440,000	24,000	82,100	643,000	+ 96,900	Israel Battres
Flip location: Hawthorne, California
23	10	"A Neglected Flip"	June 10, 2014	325,000	14,500	TBA	456,000	+ 73,900	Israel Battres
Flip location: Anaheim, California
24	11	"Ranch House of Ruin"	June 17, 2014	345,000	25,000	60,000	510,000	+ 80,000	Israel Battres
Flip location: Buena Park, California
25	12	"Mid-Century Flip"	June 24, 2014	520,000	30,000	124,600	725,000	+ 39,000	Israel Battres
Flip location: Long Beach, California
26	13	"A Risky Flip"	July 1, 2014	350,000	17,000	73,000	499,900	+ 59,900	Jeff Lawrence
Flip location: West Covina, California
27	14	"Hilltop Hangup"	July 8, 2014	560,000	26,800	67,000	715,000	+ 61,200	Steve Cederquist
Flip location: La Mirada, California; Note: During Flip or Flop Follow Up, it was revealed that took 2 months to sell the house. With a sale price of $715k, total investment of $627k, closing costs of $26,800, the profit was $61,200.

=== Season 3 ===
No. overall	No. in season	Title	Original air date	Cost of home ($)	Closing cost ($)	Rehab cost ($)	Sale price ($)	Profit/loss ($)	Contractor
28	1	"Cracked Flip"	October 7, 2014	555,000	No Closing Cost; 10,000 escrow fees	103,400	730,000	+ 61,600	Israel Battres
Flip location: Yorba Linda, California; Note: Tarek & Christina sold this house to Tarek's sister, Angelique, for $20,000 less than what they intended to list the house for. Closing costs were also waived.
29	2	"Toxic Flip"	April 7, 2015	255,000	15,000	62,900	429,900	+ 97,000	Steve Cederquist
Flip location: Garden Grove, California
30	3	"Custom Craftsman"	April 14, 2015	410,000	25,000	125,000	625,000	+ 65,000	Israel Battres; Jessie Rodriguez
Flip location: Santa Ana, California; Note: All costs and profits on this flip were split 50/50 with Jessie Rodriguez.
31	4	"Abandoned Flip"	April 21, 2015	235,000	20,000	100,000	410,000	+ 55,000	Israel Battres
Flip location: Long Beach, California
32	5	"Junk Yard Flip"	April 28, 2015	307,000	20,000	33,428	409,900	+ 49,472	Jeff Lawrence
Flip location: Long Beach, California; Note: This is the episode in which their car gets stolen.
33	6	"Pipe Dreams"	May 5, 2015	400,000	20,000	44,600	550,000	+ 85,400	Steve Cederquist
Flip location: Garden Grove, California
34	7	"Freeway Flip"	May 12, 2015	400,000	25,000	71,250	595,000	+ 98,750	Steve Cederquist
Flip location: Anaheim, California
35	8	"No Risk, No Reward"	May 19, 2015	415,000	20,000	85,300	559,000	+ 38,700	Don Jensen
Flip location: Anaheim, California; Note: HGTV.com lists this episode as being part of season 4; however, it is actually part of season 3.
36	9	"Too Good To Be True"	May 26, 2015	385,000	22,000	52,000	549,900	+ 90,900	Israel Battres
Flip location: Anaheim, California
37	10	"A Flip With The Enemy"	June 2, 2015	435,000	25,000	65,600	599,900	+ 74,300	Akeli Slade/ Jeff Lawrence
Flip location: Anaheim Hills, California; Note: All costs and profits on this flip were split 50/50 with Slade.
38	11	"Big Lot, Little Flip"	June 9, 2015	272,000	26,000	105,300	400,000	3,300	Jeff Lawrence
Flip location: Buena Park, California; Note: This is the only episode that they initially lose money that was not later revealed in Flip or Flop Follow-Up.
39	12	"The Money Pit"	June 16, 2015	315,000	TBA	60,000	Unsold	TBA	Steve Cederquist
Flip location: Norwalk, California
40	13	"Thrifty vs Glitzy"	June 23, 2015	400,000	19,200	40,700	524,900	+ 65,000	Jeff Lawrence
Flip location: Orange, California; Note: All costs and profits on this flip were split 50/50 with Pete de Best.
41	14	"A Dinky Flip"	June 30, 2015	319,000	TBA	54,300	Unsold	TBA	Steve Cederquist
Flip location: Downey, California; Note: During Flip or Flop Follow Up, it was revealed that the home took one week to sell. With a sale price of $430k, total investment of $373,300, and closing cost of $14,000, the profit was $42,700.
42	15	"Pig In A Poke"	July 7, 2015	332,000	20,000	75,400	482,500	+ 55,100	Steve Cederquist
Flip location: Fullerton, California

=== Season 4 ===
No. overall	No. in season	Title	Original air date	Cost of home ($)	Closing cost ($)	Rehab cost ($)	Sale price ($)	Profit/loss ($)	Contractor
43	1	"Of Wreck and Ruin"	December 3, 2015	225,000	15,000	124,500	460,000	+92,800	Israel Battres
Flip location: La Puente, California; Note: The initial offer fell through and later sold for 455k, for a profit of 87,800.
44	2	"Fun House Flip"	December 10, 2015	340,000	20,000	82,000	507,000	+65,000	Frank Miller
Flip location: Anaheim, California
45	3	"Diamond in the Rough"	December 17, 2015	480,000	25,000	65,200	650,000	+76,300	Frank Miller
Flip location: Costa Mesa, California
46	4	"Abort Flip"	January 7, 2016	275,000	16,000	65,000	405,000	+57,500	Steve Cederquist
Flip location: Long Beach, California
47	5	" Big Money Flip"	January 14, 2016	710,000	55,000	212,900	1,149,000	+167,600	Steve Cederquist
Flip location: Costa Mesa, California
48	6	"Breaking Up"	January 21, 2016	315,000	TBD	75,000	515,000	TBD	Israel Battres
Flip location: Torrance, California; Note: During Flip or Flop Follow Up, it was revealed that the home took more than six months to sell. With a sale price of $515,000, total investment of $390,000, and closing cost of $22,000, the profit was $103,000.
49	7	"Trickle Down Flip"	January 28, 2016	260,000	18,000	51,400	425,000	+92,100	Jeff Lawrence
Flip location: Chino, California
50	8	"Boxed In Flip"	February 4, 2016	340,000	18,000	55,150	485,000	+68,050	Tony Perez
Flip location: Fullerton, California
51	9	"Natural Disaster"	February 11, 2016	899,000	40,000	196,400	1,400,000	+130,550	Steve Cederquist; Pete de Best
Flip location: Anaheim Hills, California; Note: House bought by Pete de Best.
52	10	"Dilapidated Flip"	February 18, 2016	290,000	18,000	59,900	419,900	+48,500	Frank Miller
Flip location: Santa Ana, California
53	11	"A Frantic Fiasco"	February 25, 2016	460,000	25,000	192,500	649,900	+68,900	Frank Miller
Flip location: Placentia, California
54	12	"Million Dollar Flip"	March 3, 2016	989,000	50,000	140,000	1,350,000	+167,500	Don Jensen
Flip location: Yorba Linda, California
55	13	"Pesky Flip"	March 10, 2016	355,000	22,000	45,550	550,000	+123,650	Frank Miller
Flip location: Santa Ana, California
56	14	"House of Hidden Horrors"	March 17, 2016	400,000	20,000	55,000	515,000	+37,200	Don Jensen
Flip location: La Habra, California
57	15	"A Family Friendly Flip"	February 11, 2016	550,000	N/A	75,300	725,000	+18,750	Steve Cederquist; Carlos Zepeda
Flip location: Anaheim Hills, California; Note: House owned by Carlos' family. His profit was $114,350. Tarek and Christina received commissions from Carlos.

=== Season 5 ===
No. overall	No. in season	Title	Original air date	Cost of home ($)	Closing cost ($)	Rehab cost ($)	Sale price ($)	Profit/loss ($)	Contractor
58	1	"Down to the Studs"	June 9, 2016	250,000	20,000	115,000	470,500	+105,700	Frank Miller
Flip location: Whittier, California
59	2	"Cat Nip Flip"	June 16, 2016	475,000	30,428	138,572	Unsold	TBA	Tony Perez; Frank Miller
Flip location: La Palma, California; Note: The house eventually sold for 690k, for a profit of 46k.
60	3	"Old Time Flip"	June 23, 2016	300,000	15,000	77,450	426,500	+30,250	Frank Miller
Flip location: Santa Ana, California
61	4	"Communal Flip"	June 30, 2016	425,000	20,000	87,600	589,900	+57,300	Frank Miller
Flip location: Anaheim Hills, California
62	5	"Fire Sale Flip"	July 7, 2016	525,000	TBA	99,500	735,000	+110,500	Frank Miller
Flip location: Costa Mesa, California
63	6	"New Flips, Familiar Faces"	July 14, 2016	240,000	16,000	57,700	397,500	+83,800	Jeff Lawrence
Flip location: Corona, California; Note: Due to Christina's pregnancy, Tarek worked with Pete de Best on this project, and all profits were split 50/50. The house later sold for 390k, for a profit of 76,300.
64	7	"Labor of Love"	July 21, 2016	875,000	40,000	237,350	1,260,000	+107,650	Frank Miller
Flip location: Fullerton, California; Note: Due to Christina's pregnancy, Tarek worked alone on this project. This is also the episode where Brayden is born in.
65	8	"Split at the Seams"	July 28, 2016	270,000	20,000	92,250	460,000	+77,750	Israel Battres
Flip location: Torrance, California
66	9	"Beachside Beauty"	August 25, 2016	755,000	45,000	293,300	1,200,000	+106,700	Israel Battres
Flip location: Torrance, California; Landscape contractor: Chris Cox (California Coast Contracting)
67	10	"Split-Level Falls"	September 1, 2016	420,000	30,000	170,000	745,000	+121,200	Jeff Lawrence
Flip location: Long Beach, California; Landscape contractor: Chris Cox (California Coast Contracting)
68	11	"Backyard Staycation"	September 8, 2016	450,000	22,000	216,800	699,000	+10,200	Jeff Lawrence
Flip location: Riverside, California; Landscape contractor: Chris Cox (California Coast Contracting); Note: This house later sold for 672,500, for a loss of 16,300.
69	12	"Pooling Value"	September 15, 2016	590,000	TBD	226,800	Unsold	TBD	Israel Battres
Flip location: Cypress, California; Landscape contractor: Jesse Escalera (Calimingo Pool Builders); Note: The house eventually sold for 890k, for a profit of 73,200.
70	13	"Poolside Potential"	September 22, 2016	430,000	20,000	253,800	753,000	+49,200	Jake Rigel
Flip location: Whittier, California; Landscape contractor: Jesse Escalera (Calimingo Pool Builders)

=== Season 6 ===
No. overall	No. in season	Title	Original air date	Cost of home ($)	Closing cost ($)	Rehab cost ($)	Sale price ($)	Profit/loss ($)	Contractor
71	1	"Hidden Potential"	December 1, 2016	318,000	20,000	101,650	515,000	+75,350	Frank Miller
Flip location: Garden Grove, California
72	2	"Substitute Flip"	December 8, 2016	426,000	25,000	69,000	619,000	+99,000	Frank Miller
Flip location: La Habra, California; Note: Because Christina was taking care of son Brayden, Tarek works with Pete de Best on this project, and all profits were split 50/50.
73	3	"Narrow Margin Flip"	December 15, 2016	365,000	20,000	72,400	495,000	+37,600	Tony Perez; Frank Miller
Flip location: Anaheim, California; Note: Tarek and Christina worked with Pete de Best on a house that he bought. All profits were split 50/50.
74	4	"Fast Money Flip"	December 22, 2016	345,000	20,000	63,700	475,000	+46,300	Frank Miller
Flip location: Whittier, California
75	5	"Beached Bungalow"	January 5, 2017	425,000	20,000	80,100	549,900	+24,800	Frank Miller
Flip location: Long Beach, California
76	6	"Doll House Flip"	January 12, 2017	430,000	22,000	97,100	660,000	+110,900	Frank Miller
Flip location: Garden Grove, California
77	7	"Midcentury Miss"	January 19, 2017	447,000	25,000	95,800	630,000	+62,200	Julio Rodriguez; Frank Miller
Flip location: La Habra, California
78	8	"Addition and Subtraction"	January 26, 2017	325,000	20,000	124,000	569,900	+100,900	Jake Rigel
Flip location: Garden Grove, California
79	9	"Double Lot Limbo"	February 2, 2017	510,000	25,000	83,800	567,000	+198,200	Jake Rigel
Flip location: Buena Park, California; Note: The home had a large lot in the back which was divided from the house and sold separately.
80	10	"Ready-to-Flip Ranch"	February 9, 2017	340,000	20,000	63,800	510,000	+86,200	Jake Rigel
Flip location: Anaheim, California
81	11	"Hot Market, Fast Flip"	February 16, 2017	340,000	20,000	73,800	530,000	+96,200	Frank Miller
Flip location: Garden Grove, California
82	12	"Wishful Workshop"	February 23, 2017	340,000	20,000	79,200	550,000	+110,800	Jake Rigel
Flip location: Garden Grove, California
83	13	"Lessons in Laguna Beach"	March 2, 2017	900,000	40,000	123,800	1,149,000	+85,200	Israel Battres
Flip location: Laguna Beach, California
84	14	"Diving into a Flip"	March 9, 2017	$387,000	$25,000	$123,800	$610,000	+$74,200	Jeff Lawrence
Flip location: Anaheim, California
85	15	"Hillside Horror"	March 16, 2017	$900,000	$50,000	$281,000	$1,315,000	+80,000	Israel Battress
Flip location: Palos Verdes, California; Note: The house later sold for $1,315,000 for a profit of $80,000.
86	16	"False Start Flip"	March 23, 2017	310,000	20,000	145,800	579,900	+104,100	Ken Garrison
Flip location: El Monte, California; Note: This house later sold for 588k, for a profit of 112,200.
87	17	"Beaming With Potential"	March 30, 2017	425,000	20,000	114,600	619,900	+60,300	Jake Rigel
Flip location: Cypress, California

=== Season 7 ===
No. overall	No. in season	Title	Original air date	Cost of home ($)	Closing cost ($)	Rehab cost ($)	Sale price ($)	Profit/loss ($)	Contractor
88	1	"A Deceiving Deal"	June 15, 2017	370,000	20,000	95,000	540,000	+55,000	Jeff Lawrence
Flip location: Whittier, California; Note: Tarek and Christina visited this house and they considered it as the dirtiest house ever, with the dirtiest kitchen and the worst smell. They also found a turkey in the kitchen. During the first day of demolition, Tarek ran quickly to remove the turkey.
89	2	"Switching Rooms"	June 22, 2017	435,000	19,000	85,800	600,000	+60,200	Israel Battres
Flip location: Garden Grove, California
90	3	"Post-Purchase Problems"	June 29, 2017	340,000	20,000	95,300	550,000	+94,700	Jeff Lawrence
Flip location: Anaheim, California
91	4	"Midcentury Maze"	July 6, 2017	435,000	25,000	85,050	650,000	+104,950	Israel Battres
Tarek and Christina check out a three bedroom, two bathroom home in Garden Grove, California, that is dirty with a mosquito-infested pool, but has the potential to be charming.: Flip location: Garden Grove, California
92	5	"Infringing Flip"	July 13, 2017	425,000	20,000	78,300	599,900	+76,600	Jeff Lawrence
Flip location: Garden Grove, California
93	6	"Junk-Pile Flip"	June 18, 2018	280,000	11,600	118,400	477,500	+67,500	Jeff Lawrence
Flip location: Long Beach, California
95	7	"Shattered Flip"	July 12, 2018	442,500	20,000	95,000	607,000	+50,000	Jeff Lawrence
Flip location: Lakewood, California
96	8	"Midcentury Markup"	August 2, 2018	540,000	25,000	99,000	674,900	+10,000	Israel Battres
Flip location: Santa Ana, California
97	9	"Pigeonhole Flip"	June 28, 2018	435,000	25,000	74,200	600,000	+65,800	Jeff Lawrence
Flip location: Santa Ana, California
98	10	"What's Old is New Again"	August 16, 2018	390,000	21,000	83,500	560,000	+65,500	Jeff Lawrence
Flip location: Hacienda Heights, California
99	11	"Rock Bottom Flip"	September 9, 2018	400,000	20,000	90,000	570,000	+60,000	Israel Battres
Flip location: Whittier, California
100	12	"Two Houses for Sale"	June 7, 2018	465,000	25,000	80,000	639,000	+69,000	Israel Battres
Flip location: Buena Park, California
101	13	"Flipping and Dating"	May 31, 2018	517,500	20,000	74,200	700,888	+89,188	Jeff Lawrence
Flip location: Diamond Bar, California
102	14	"Bursting at the Seams"	June 14, 2018	420,000	25,500	84,500	605,000	+75,000	Israel Battres
Flip location: La Mirada, California
103	15	"Tri-Level Flip"	July 26, 2018	675,000	25,000	140,000	999,000	+154,000	Jeff Lawrence
Flip location: Orange, California
104	16	"New Normal in Arcadia"	July 5, 2018	825,000	30,000	93,800	1,160,000	211,200	Jeff Lawrence
Flip location: Arcadia, California
105	17	"Dark and Dingy"	July 19, 2018	420,000	20,000	100,000	652,000	+112,000	Israel Battres
Flip location: Gardena, California
106	18	"Rotten Flip"	August 23, 2018	750,000	30,000	130,000	1,030,000	+120,000	Israel Battres
Flip location: Anaheim Hills, California
107	19	"Fantastic Flip"	August 30, 2018	570,000	29,000	102,100	815,000	+113,900	Jeff Lawrence
Flip location: Costa Mesa, California
108	20	"Infested Flip"	September 6, 2018	400,000	20,000	100,000	580,000	+60,000	Jeff Lawrence
Flip location: Santa Ana, California

=== Season 8 ===
No. overall	No. in season	Title	Original air date	Cost of home ($)	Closing cost ($)	Rehab cost ($)	Sale price ($)	Profit/loss ($)	Contractor
109	1	"Unpermitted Flip"	August 1, 2019	475,000	20,000	100,400	638,000	+42,600	Jeff Lawrence
Flip location: Rowland Heights, California
110	2	"Fish Out of Water"	August 8, 2019	475,000	25,000	81,700	665,000	+83,300	Jeff Lawrence
Flip location: West Covina, California
111	3	"Flea Bag Flip"	August 15, 2019	380,000	20,000	93,000	570,000	+77,000	Jeff Lawrence
Flip location: Rowland Heights, California
112	4	"Bankrupt Flip"	August 22, 2019	430,000	25,000	90,000	599,900	+54,900	Jeff Lawrence
Flip location: Anaheim, California
113	5	"Alarming Flip"	August 29, 2019	510,000	20,000	89,400	649,900	+30,500	Jeff Lawrence
Flip location: Cypress, California
114	6	"Midcentury Money Pit"	September 5, 2019	565,000	30,000	95,300	770,000	+79,700	Jeff Lawrence
Flip location: Fullerton, California
115	7	"It's a Dump"	September 12, 2019	465,000	25,000	100,000	674,900	+84,900	Jeff Lawrence
Flip location: Lakewood, California
116	8	"Money Mirage"	September 19, 2019	725,000	35,000	104,800	985,000	+120,200	Jeff Lawrence
Flip location: Irvine, California
117	9	"Additional Problems"	September 26, 2019	558,000	TBA	104,000	TBA	TBA	Jeff Lawrence
Flip location: Long Beach, California
118	10	"Cliff Makeover"	October 3, 2019	445,000	25,000	102,700	650,000	+77,300	Israel Battres
This episode finds Tarek and Christina flipping their second Cliff May house.: Flip location: Anaheim, California
119	11	"Turf Wars"	October 10, 2019	745,000	20,000	90,000	974,900	+59,950	Jeff Lawrence
Tarek and Christina partnered with Pete de Best for this flip and split the $119,900 profit 50/50 with him.: Flip location: Yorba Linda, California
120	12	"Hoarding Potential"	October 17, 2019	400,000	25,000	106,500	617,000	+42,750	Jeff Lawrence
Tarek partnered with Robert Drenk for this flip (Robert's first), and split the $85,500 profit 50/50 with him.: Flip location: Lakewood, California
121	13	"Buyer's Remorse"	October 24, 2019	740,000	25,000	135,600	1,039,000	+163,400	Jeff Lawrence
Flip location: Yorba Linda, California
122	14	"Small House, Big Problems"	November 7, 2019	390,000	25,000	87,300	575,000	+72,700	Israel Battres
Flip location: Fullerton, California
123	15	"Big House, Big Budget"	November 14, 2019	700,000	35,200	194,800	1,099,000	+169,000	Jeff Lawrence
Flip location: Anaheim Hills, California
124	16	"Million-Dollar Cookie Cutter"	November 21, 2019	900,000	TBA	173,800	1,314,900	+241,100	Jeff Lawrence
Flip location: Newport Beach, California
125	17	"Treasure Hunt"	December 5, 2019	540,000	25,000	93,300	760,000	+101,700	Jeff Lawrence
Deceased seller rumored to have hidden large amounts of cash in the house due to mistrust of banks; contractor Jeff Lawrence pranked Tarek & Christina in their search for cash they never found.: Flip location: Fullerton, California
126	18	"Broken Flip"	December 12, 2019	475,000	25,000	92,050	649,900	+57,850	Jeff Lawrence
Flip location: Anaheim, California

=== Season 9 ===
No. overall	No. in season	Title	Original air date	Cost of home ($)	Closing cost ($)	Rehab cost ($)	Sale price ($)	Profit/loss ($)	Contractor
127	1	"Back House Flip"	October 15, 2020	450,000	25,000	95,000	675,000	+105,000	Jeff Lawrence
Flip location: Lakewood, California
128	2	"Better Be Quick"	October 22, 2020	670,000	35,000	117,000	899,900	+77,900	Jeff Lawrence
Flip location: Fountain Valley, California
129	3	"Busy Flip"	October 29, 2020	415,000	25,000	145,200	700,000	+114,800	Jeff Lawrence
Flip location: La Mirada, California

=== From Rags to Riches ===
No. in season	Title	
1	"Risky Business"	September 13, 2018
2	"No Business Like the Flipping Business"	September 20, 2018
3	"From Drab to Fab Design"	September 27, 2018
4	"We've Been Through It All"	October 4, 2018
