= Brande Roderick =

American model and actress (born 1974)

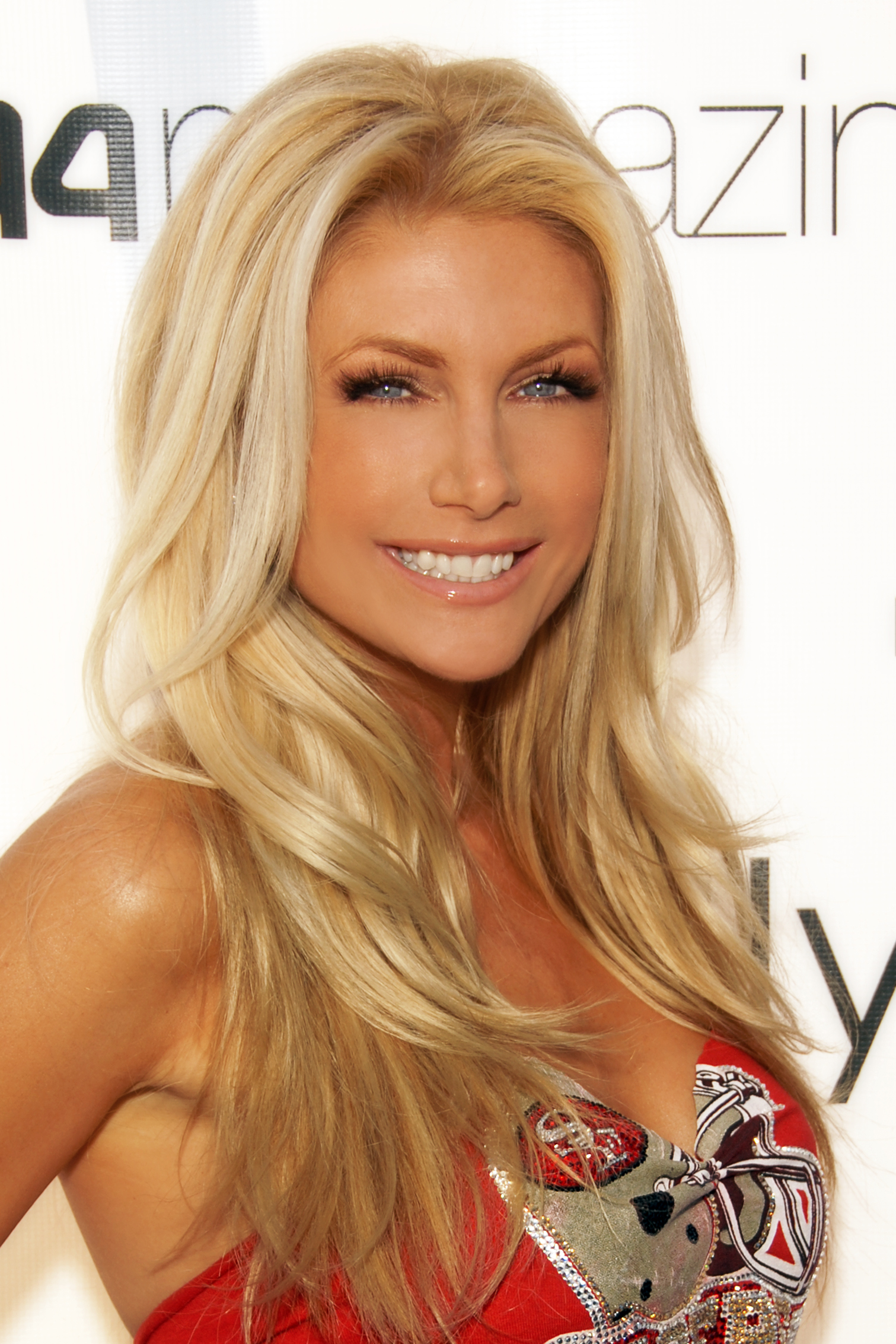
- Roderick at the Playboy Mansion on February 1, 2009
- Born: Brande Nicole Roderick; June 13, 1974 (age 52); Novato, California, U.S.
- Education: Santa Rosa Junior College
- Occupations: Model, actress
- Years active: 1998–present
- Spouse: Glenn Cadrez (m. 2007; div. 2017)
- Partner(s): Hugh Hefner (1999–2000); Cade McNown (2000–2001) Robert Renzoni (2018- Present)
- Children: 2

Playboy centerfold appearance
- April 2000
- Preceded by: Nicole Lenz
- Succeeded by: Brooke Berry

Playboy Playmate of the Year
- 2001
- Preceded by: Jodi Ann Paterson
- Succeeded by: Dalene Kurtis

Personal details
- Height: 5 ft 7 in (1.70 m)
- Website: www.branderoderick.com

Brande Nicole Roderick (born June 13, 1974) is an American model, author and actress. In 2000, she portrayed Leigh Dyer, a former coast guard turned lifeguard in Baywatch. She was Playmate of the Month for April 2000 and then became 2001's Playmate of the Year.

== Career ==
In 2000, Roderick starred as Leigh Dyer in Baywatch. In April 2000, she appeared in Playboy magazine as Playmate of the Month. In 2001, Roderick became the Playmate of the Year. In 2003, she starred in the Bollywood movie Out of Control, as the American wife of an Indian man (played by Riteish Deshmukh) who, on a visit to India, gets pressured by his family into marrying an Indian girl.

Other film credits include Starsky & Hutch, Snoop Dogg's Hood of Horror, Club Wild Side 2 and The Nanny Diaries. In addition, she has guest-starred in Joey, The Parkers, Just Shoot Me!, Fear Factor and Beverly Hills, 90210.

=== Appearances ===
Roderick is a "Girl of RPS" for the USA Rock Paper Scissors League. In 2006, Roderick was one of six celebrity contestants on the CBS summer series, Gameshow Marathon. She was the runner-up to Kathy Najimy. In 2009, she appeared in the second season of Celebrity Apprentice. Throughout the season, each celebrity raised money for a charity of his or her choice; Roderick selected the California Police Youth Charities. On the second to last episode of Celebrity Apprentice 2, she was eliminated along with fellow contestant Jesse James from the final four.

In April 2009, Roderick served as host of the Playboy Shootout reality competition on Playboy TV.

In February 2012, Roderick hosted the Aces & Angels Super Bowl XLVI Party in Indianapolis, Indiana alongside Leeann Tweeden and Elaine Alden. In 2013 she returned in Celebrity Apprentice 6 All-Star, with Claudia Jordan and Dennis Rodman of season 2.

=== Ventures ===
As of 2008, Roderick had a networking company named Financially Hung. She described the company as being "like MySpace for adults."

She also has a business partnership with Adam Levine of Maroon 5 in the Italian designer shoe label Pantofola d'Oro.

== Personal life ==
Roderick was born in Novato, California, and attended Santa Rosa Junior College. She dated the late Playboy founder Hugh Hefner from 2000 to 2001 and was also romantically linked to former NFL player Cade McNown. In August 2006, she became engaged to Glenn Cadrez, a former NFL player who played 11 seasons for the Denver Broncos, the New York Jets and the Kansas City Chiefs. They married in June 2007 and have two sons. They divorced in 2017.

== See also ==
- List of people in Playboy 2000–09

Carol and Darlene Bernaola	Suzanne Stokes	Nicole Lenz	Brande Roderick	Brooke Berry	Shannon Stewart
Neferteri Shepherd	Summer Altice	Kerissa Fare	Nichole Van Croft	Buffy Tyler	Cara Michelle
