= Real Estate Elevated =

- United States

Information
- Former name: Success Path
- Type: Educational Program
- Established: 2013
- Faculty: Tarek and Christina El-Moussa
- Website: reelevatedevents.com
- Established based on HGTV’s ‘Flip or Flop’

Real Estate Elevated (formerly known as Success Path) is an educational program that provides real estate investment training and aims to help students find and flip houses in the United States. Following the premiere of the HGTV’s ‘Flip or Flop’ in 2013, the show’s hosts, Tarek and Christina El-Moussa, launched Real Estate Elevated.

== History ==
Tarek and Christina El-Moussa became involved in the real estate flipping business shortly after the 2008 recession. They downsized their lifestyle so that they could begin investing in this new venture and they honed their skills over the years that followed.

When they were approached by HGTV in 2013, house flipping was not yet mainstream. The show is now on its sixth season and the couple shares their knowledge and unique strategies through their Real Estate Elevated seminars that are held all over the United States. The Real Estate Elevated program was created to give individuals the tools necessary to start their own real estate flipping businesses. Aspiring investors are invited to attend a free seminar before deciding on an education plan that suits their individual goals.

=== Origins ===
Tarek and Christina El Moussa, like many in the U.S., suffered a significant financial crisis back in 2008. Their income dried up, and they were forced to downsize their home, their car, and their job. They struggled to regain the financial freedom they had previously enjoyed for a few years. Then they discovered house flipping. They flipped their first property in 2010, and never looked back.

By 2012, they had been signed by HGTV to film a new reality show: Flip or Flop. The added publicity shed light on their growing expertise, and they started sharing their hard-won industry knowledge with other real estate investors. Their desire to share their method with those who want to achieve the same financial security as they did led to the founding of Real Estate Elevated—an education system that teaches would-be flippers how to be successful.

Since then, Tarek and Christina have trained thousands of real estate experts, many of whom now train others in the Real Estate Elevated program.

== Concept ==
In the last few decades, flipping houses has become a popular way to earn money, both as supplemental income, and as a primary occupation. Unlike many sources of income, however, there’s significant risk involved in the process. An inexperienced flipper stands to suffer significant losses on their investment if they make the wrong mistakes—a fact that can frequently serve as a barrier to entry for those wanting to join the industry.

Real Estate Elevated helps new and less experienced flippers to minimize the risk involved by closing the knowledge gap. Real estate industry experts teach methods and tactics pioneered and refined by Tarek and Christina El Moussa, sharing their secrets for success to up-and-coming entrepreneurs.

The training is provided in several different formats. It starts with a free two-and-a-half hour renovation training event that discusses the basics. The next step is a three day “Real Estate Accelerator Workshop” that goes into deeper detail on Real Estate Elevated’s methodologies. Beyond these primary trainings, they offer ongoing mentoring and coaching, including large events and one-on-one trainings.

The trainings focus on critical parts of the flipping process, including how to find properties, how to get financing, how to create cash flow, and how to do wholesale deals.

== Habitat for Humanity ==
After the Houston flooding in 2016, Real Estate Elevated donated $150,000 to Habitat for Humanity, an organization that helps people in need buy or repair homes. So far, the money has helped rebuild three homes that were damaged during the storm in the Houston, Texas area.
