= Heather Rae El Moussa =

American model and TV star (born 1987)

- Born: Heather Rae Young; September 16, 1987 (age 39); Anaheim, California, U.S.
- Height: 5 ft 7 in (1.70 m)
- Spouse: Tarek El Moussa (m. 2021)
- Children: 1

Heather Rae El Moussa (née Young; born September 16, 1987) is an American model and reality television star who appeared on multiple seasons of Selling Sunset, a Netflix reality television show focused on The Oppenheim Group, a real estate brokerage firm dealing in luxury homes in the Los Angeles area.

== Career ==
El Moussa was the Playboy Playmate of the Month for February 2010. Since then, she has had a role in eight films, including 2014's Love in the Time of Monsters.

El Moussa obtained her real estate license in 2014, and appeared in Seasons 1 to 7 of Selling Sunset, a Netflix reality television show showcasing luxury Los Angeles real estate, before leaving the show to raise her son. She made a cameo appearance in the show's 9th season.

El Moussa flips homes alongside her husband Tarek El Moussa in HGTV's The Flipping El Moussas. She also appears on The Flip Off and Flipping 101.

== Personal life ==
On October 23, 2021, she married fellow real estate agent and house flipper, Tarek El Moussa at the Rosewood Miramar Beach Hotel in Montecito. The wedding was the subject of the Discovery+ special Tarek and Heather: The Big I Do. In 2023, the couple had a son, Tristan.

El Moussa is vegan.

== Filmography ==
Year	Title	Role	Notes
2010	'Til Death	Tina	Season 4, episode 34, The Baby
2011	Chillerama	Secretary	Segment: Wadzilla
2012	Christmas in Compton	Paulette	
2012	Mafia	Kim	
2013	Dead Reckoning	Terri	
2013	The Internship	Exotic Dancer #2	
2014	Love in the Time of Monsters	Brandi	
2016	Comedy Bang! Bang!	Beach Woman	Season 5, episode 12, Gillian Jacobs Wears a Gray Checkered Suit and a Red Bow Tie
2019–2023, 2025–	Selling Sunset	Herself	Main: Seasons 1-6, 10–, Recurring: Season 7, Guest: Season 9 [56 Episodes]
2021	Tarek and Heather: The Big I Do	Herself	
2020–2023	Flipping 101 with Tarek El Moussa	Herself	Seasons 1-3; 21 episodes
2023	Malibu Horror Story	Jessica	
2023–2025	The Flipping El Moussas	Herself; 21 episodes	
2024	House Hunters: All Stars	Herself	
2024	Clint	Lisa	
2025	The Flip Off	Herself: 6 Episodes	
