= List of Playboy Playmates of 2010 =

The following is a list of Playboy Playmates of 2010. Playboy magazine names its Playmate of the Month each month throughout the year.

== January ==
Jaime Faith Edmondson
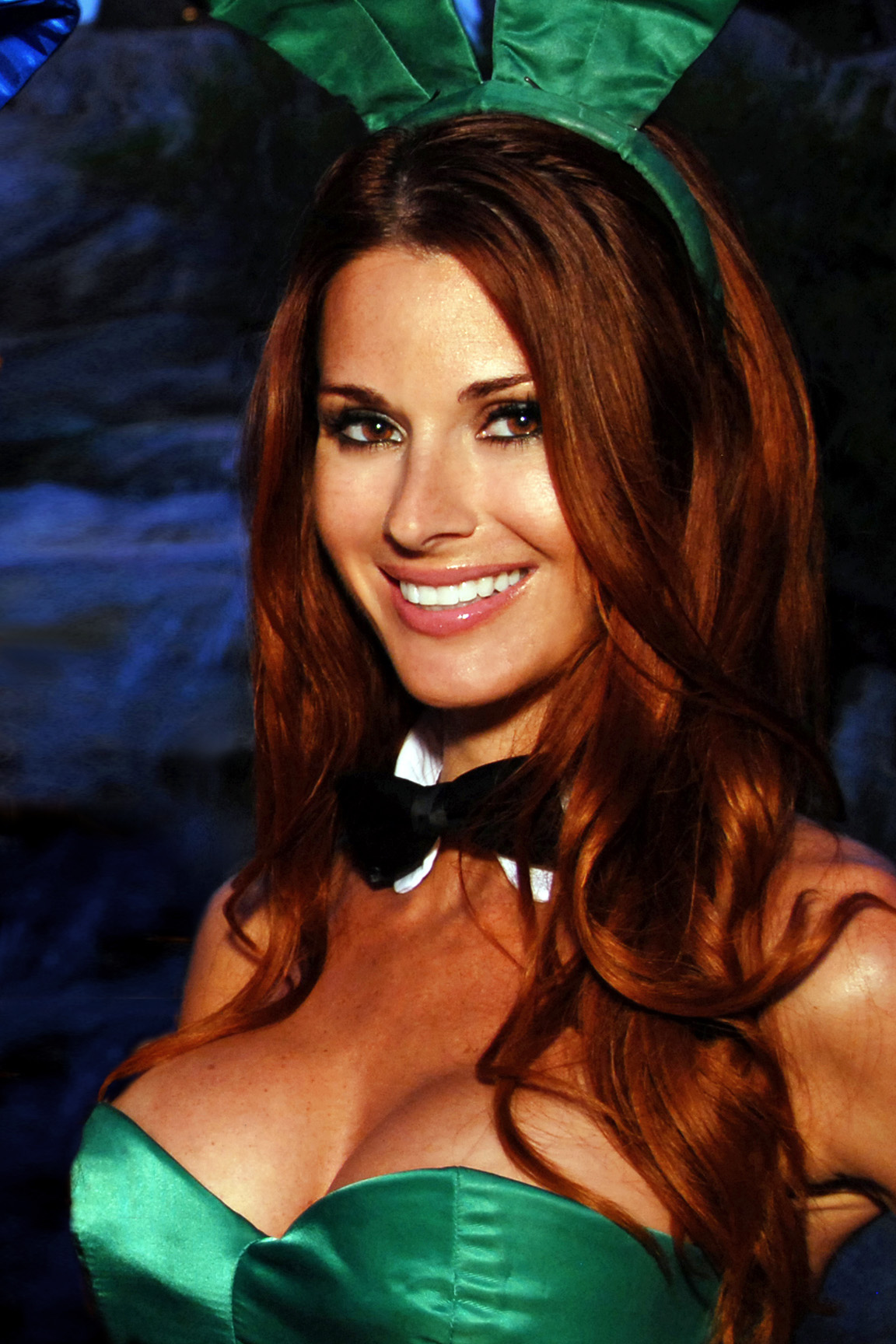
- Edmondson at the Playboy Mansion on July 23, 2011

Personal details
- Born: December 30, 1978 (age 47) Bartow, Florida, US
- Height: 5 ft 8 in (173 cm)

Jaime Faith Edmondson (born December 30, 1978) is an American model. She is the Playboy Playmate of the Month for January 2010. Edmondson is a 2002 graduate of Florida Atlantic University with a degree in Criminal Justice. She is a former police officer and Miami Dolphins cheerleader. Edmondson and fellow Miami Dolphins cheerleader Cara Rosenthal appeared on The Amazing Race 14, finishing in second place, and returned in The Amazing Race 18 as the third team eliminated. Edmondson and baseball player Evan Longoria were married on December 31, 2015. The couple have three children.

== February ==
Heather Rae El Moussa

Personal details
- Born: Heather Rae Young; September 16, 1987 (age 39) Anaheim, California, U.S.
- Height: 5 ft 7 in (1.70 m)

Heather Rae El Moussa (née Young; born September 16, 1987) is an American model and was the Playboy Playmate of the Month for February 2010. Since her time as Playmate she has had a role in eight films including 2014's Love in the Time of Monsters. Young is also a real estate agent, obtaining her real estate license in 2014. Her work is showcased in Selling Sunset, a Netflix reality television show focused on The Oppenheim Group, a real estate brokerage firm dealing in luxury homes in the Los Angeles area as well as the Orange County and San Diego areas.

In October 2021, she married fellow real estate agent and flipper, Tarek El Moussa. They announced in July 2022 that they were expecting their first child together and their son was born on January 31, 2023.

== March ==
Kyra Milan

Personal details
- Born: November 2, 1989 (age 36) Lake City, Florida, U.S.
- Height: 5 ft 7 in (1.70 m)

Kyra Milan (born November 2, 1989) is the Playboy Playmate of the Month for March 2010.

== April ==
Amy Leigh Andrews

Personal details
- Born: September 19, 1984 (age 42) Conyers, Georgia, U.S.
- Height: 5 ft 2 in (1.57 m)

Amy Leigh Andrews (born September 19, 1984) is an internationally published cover model, centerfold and former Playboy Playmate. Andrews has continually expanded her career, appearing in numerous magazines, including FHM and Maxim, as well as modeling for various brands such as Soleil Organics Skincare and Beach Bunny Swimwear. In addition to modeling, Andrews focuses on social media marketing and brand ambassadorship to help align companies with their target audiences.

== May ==
Kassie Lyn Logsdon
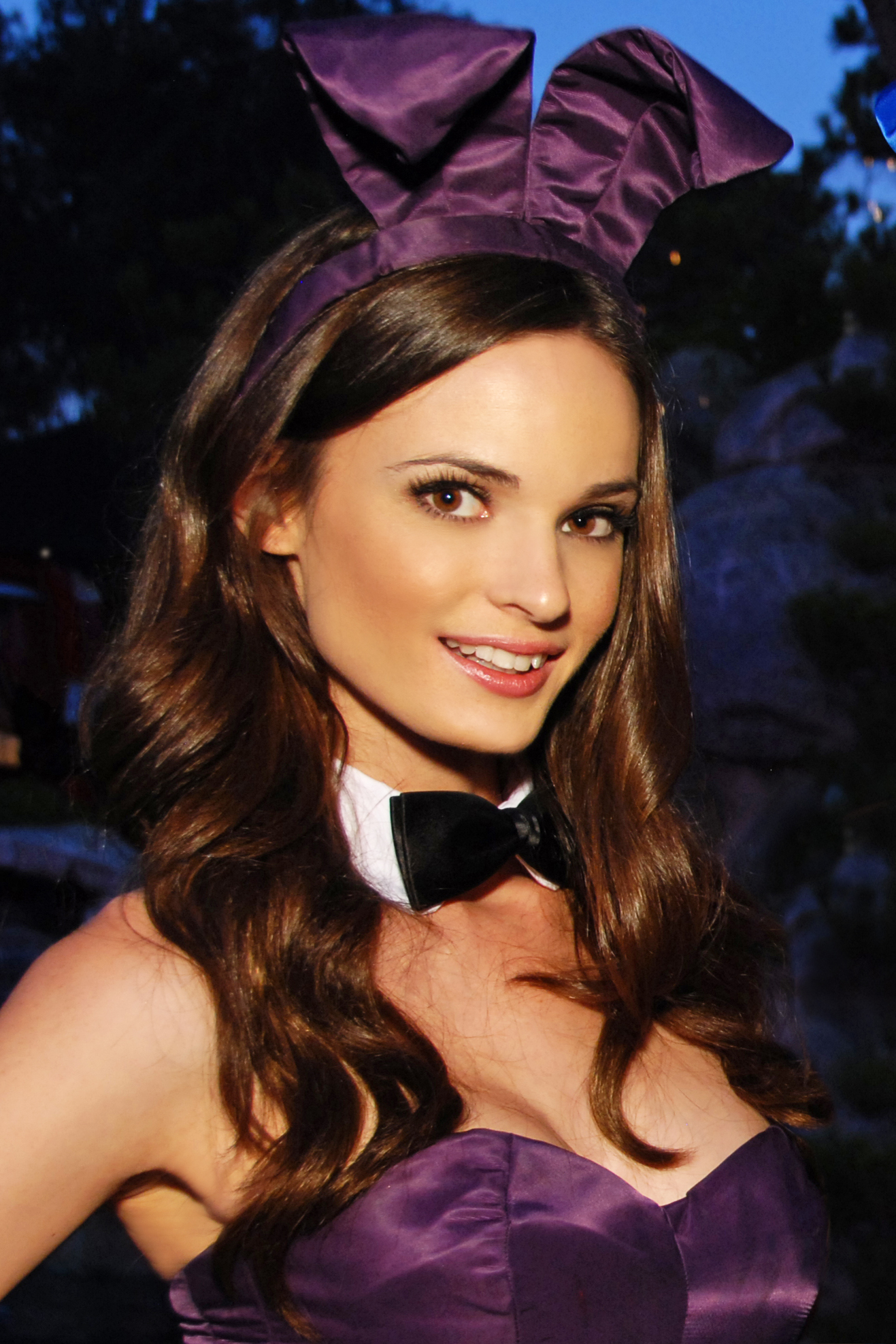
- Logsdon at the Playboy Mansion on July 23, 2011

Personal details
- Born: January 6, 1987 (age 39) Hollywood, California, U.S.
- Height: 5 ft 7 in (1.70 m)

Kassie Lyn Logsdon (born January 6, 1987) is the Playboy Playmate of the Month for May 2010.

== June ==
Katie Vernola

Personal details
- Born: October 21, 1991 (age 34) Victorville, California, U.S.
- Height: 5 ft 8 in (1.73 m)

Katie Vernola (born October 21, 1991) is the Playboy Playmate of the Month for June 2010. She is the first Playmate born in the 1990s. Vernola has since joined the world of short course off-road racing, having competed in the Lucas Oil Off Road Racing Series.

== July ==
Shanna Marie McLaughlin

Personal details
- Born: May 10, 1985 (age 41) West Palm Beach, Florida, U.S.
- Height: 5 ft 8 in (1.73 m)

Shanna Marie McLaughlin (born May 10, 1985) is the Playboy Playmate of the Month for July 2010. She won her spot as a Playmate by winning the Playboy TV show Playboy Shootout.

== August ==
Francesca Frigo

Personal details
- Born: March 22, 1986 (age 40) Puerto la Cruz, Venezuela
- Height: 5 ft 5 in (1.65 m)

Francesca Frigo (born March 22, 1986) is the Playboy Playmate of the Month for August 2010.

== September ==
Olivia Paige

Personal details
- Born: May 22, 1991 (age 35) Brockport, New York, U.S.
- Height: 5 ft 7 in (1.70 m)

Olivia Paige (born May 22, 1991) is the Playboy Playmate of the Month for September 2010. Her centerfold was photographed by Arny Freytag. Prior to being chosen as a Playmate, she was runner-up in the reality show Playboy Shootout.

== October ==
Claire Sinclair
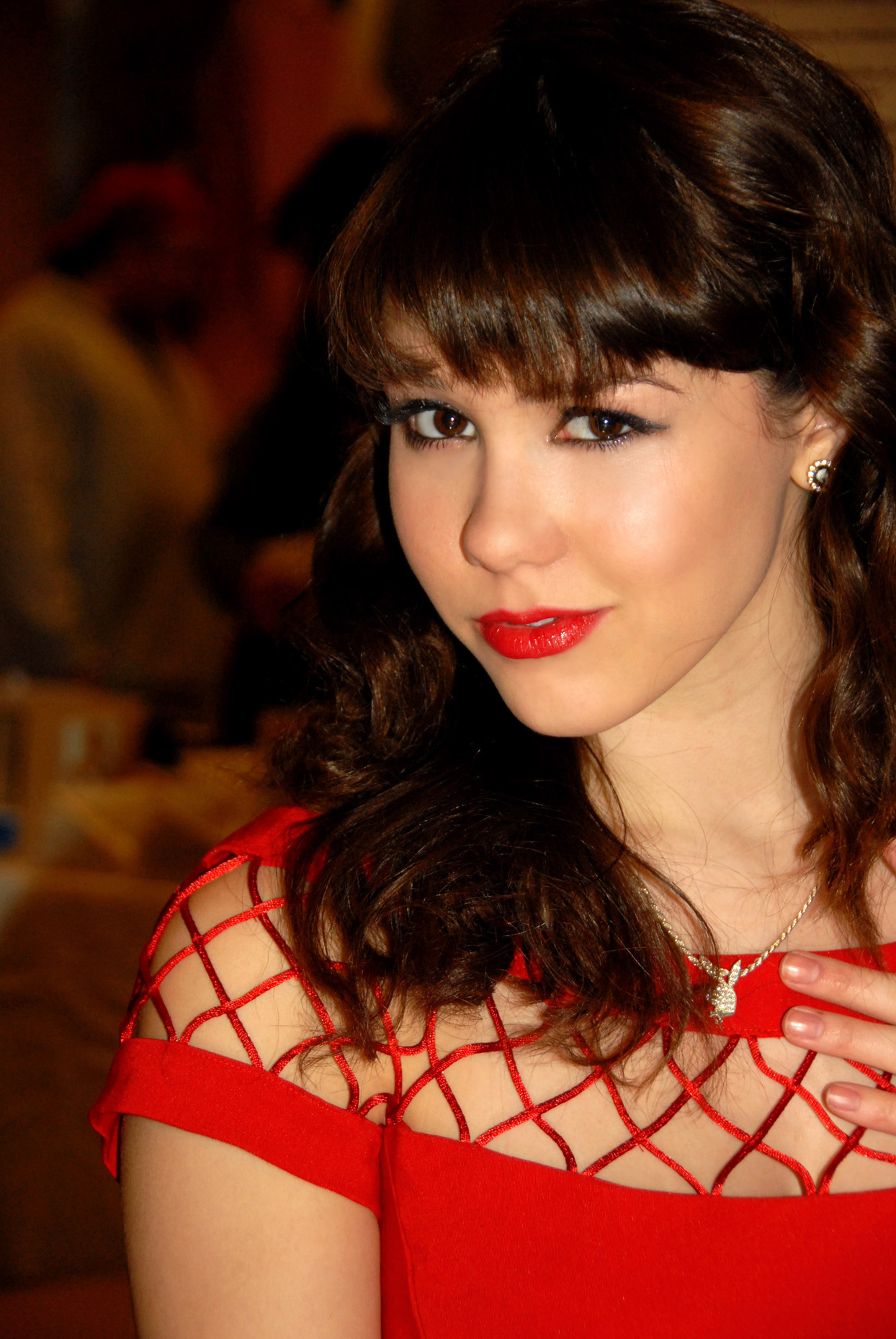
- Sinclair attending Glamourcon #50, Long Beach, CA on November 13, 2010

Playboy Playmate of the Year
- 2011
- Preceded by: Hope Dworaczyk
- Succeeded by: Jaclyn Swedberg

Personal details
- Born: May 25, 1991 (age 35) Los Angeles, California, U.S.
- Height: 5 ft 8 in (1.73 m)

Claire Sinclair (born May 25, 1991) is the Playboy Playmate of the Month for October 2010. Her centerfold was photographed by Stephen Wayda. She is also the 2011 Playmate of the Year.

== November ==
Shera Bechard
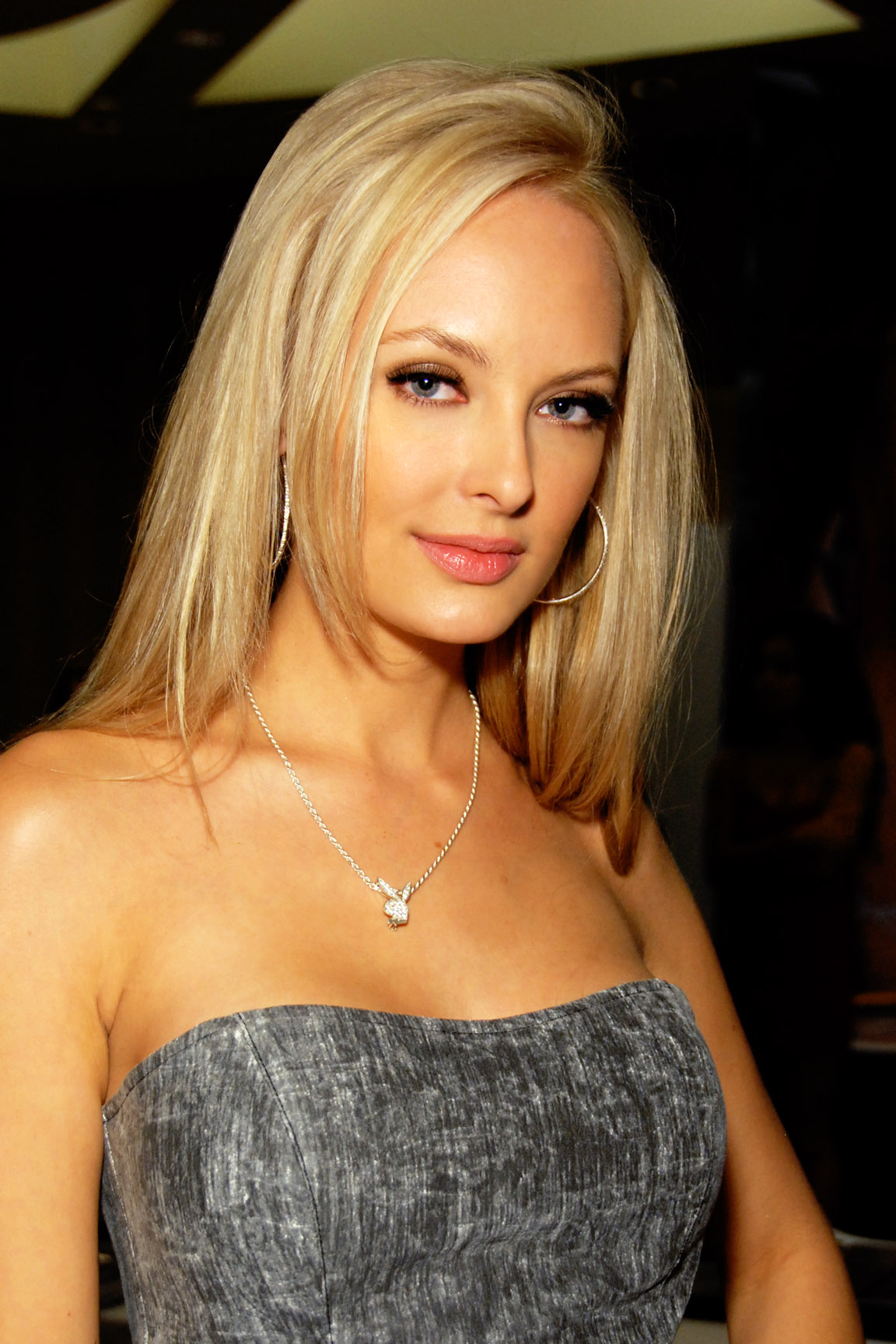
- Bechard at Glamourcon on November 13, 2010

Personal details
- Born: September 14, 1983 (age 43) Kapuskasing, Ontario, Canada
- Height: 5 ft 6 in (1.68 m)

Shera Bechard (born September 14, 1983) is the Playboy Playmate of the Month for November 2010. Her centerfold was photographed by Stephen Wayda. Bechard starred in the 2009 film Sweet Karma. Bechard became a resident of the United States in 2012 as a recipient of the EB-1 visa, also known as the Einstein visa, for workers with "extraordinary abilities".

== December ==
Ashley Hobbs

Personal details
- Born: September 3, 1989 (age 37) Harbor City, California, U.S.
- Height: 5 ft 6 in (1.68 m)

Ashley Hobbs (born September 3, 1989) is the Playboy Playmate of the Month for December 2010. Her centerfold was photographed by Arny Freytag.

== See also ==
- List of people in Playboy 2010–2019
