= Playboy Shootout =

- Playboy Shootout logo
- Created by: Bill Thill
- Starring: Brande Roderick
- Country of origin: United States

Production
- Executive producers: Bill Thill; Claudia Frank
- Production locations: Malibu, California; Santa Monica, California
- Running time: 30 mins
- Production companies: Thillville Productions; Playboy TV

Original release
- Network: Playboy TV
- Release: April 3, 2010-June 10, 2010

Playboy Shootout was an adult reality competition airing on Playboy TV produced by America's Next Top Model director Claudia Frank. Hosted by Brande Roderick, it pits 10 professional photographers and 10 models in a series of photo shoot elimination rounds. The final 2 contestants get the opportunity to be published in Playboy Magazine.

== History ==
Beginning in November 2009, PlayboyTV.com announced that it was searching for professional photographers and fashion models to compete on the Playboy Shootout reality series. Submissions were accepted via the online site and ultimately the applicants were whittled down into groups of 10 for each category, hand-picked by Hugh Hefner himself.

In early 2010, the final contestants were assembled and brought to a private Malibu mansion where they were broken into groups of 2 and instructed to endure a series of challenges. Similar to the format of Project Runway, each team of 1 photographer and 1 model was required to face a panel of 3 judges after shooting a series of pictorials utilizing specific elements dictated by host Brande Roderick (fire, water, motorcycles, etc.). The 2 mainstay judges were Playboy photographer Stephen Wayda and former Playmate, Cara Zavaleta. A third judge seat was filled by a revolving slot of Playboy-related celebrity guests, including Adrianne Curry, Sara Jean Underwood, Andrea Lowell, Tiffany Fallon, Traci Bingham, Ida Ljungqvist, Carmella DeCesare, and The Girls Next Door.

One by one, each team was eliminated, with ultimately 1 photographer and 1 model getting the chance to be featured in Playboy magazine.

Playboy Shootout premiered on April 3, 2010, at 10:00pm EST, as part of Playboy TV's new Saturday block of Date Night couples-friendly programming with a new episode appearing every Saturday until the finale on June 5, 2010.

== Contestants ==
Name	Contestant Type	Hometown	Eliminated
Cassandra Dawn	Model	El Segunda, California	Episode 7
Dany Anderson	Model	Irvine, California	Episode 1
Steve Anderson	Photographer	Los Angeles, California	Episode 3
Annah Barnes	Model	Huntington Beach, California	Episode 1
Morgan Chapman	Photographer	Los Angeles, California	Episode 9
Lisa Coffey	Model	Germany / Los Angeles, California	Episode 4
Phil Faraone	Photographer	Arcadia, California	Episode 4
Bridgette	Model	Melville, New York	Episode 3
Lorenzo Hodges	Photographer	Kansas City, Missouri	Episode 1
Brian Lowe	Photographer	Joplin, Missouri	Episode 1
Olivia Paige	Model	Holley, New York	Episode 9
Eric LaCour	Photographer	Louisiana	Episode 7
Maria Lankina	Photographer	St. Petersburg, Russia	Episode 5
Shanna Marie	Model	Jupiter, Florida	Winner
Priscilla Noelle	Model	Houston, Texas	Episode 2
Tara Marie	Model	Howell, Michigan	Episode 5
Lynda Crystal	Model	Porterville, California	Episode 6
Kate Romero	Photographer	London, England	Winner
Geoff Sanders	Photographer	Austin, TX / Los Angeles, CA	Episode 6
Marc Tousignant	Photographer	Montreal, Canada	Episode 2
