= Flip or Flop Vegas =

American reality television series

- Genre: Reality television
- Country of origin: United States
- Original language: English
- No. of seasons: 3
- No. of episodes: 37

Production
- Running time: 30 minutes

Original release
- Network: HGTV
- Release: April 6, 2017 – May 2, 2019

Related
- Flip or Flop (franchise)

Flip or Flop Vegas was a television series that aired on HGTV hosted by real estate agent Aubrey Marunde and her husband/contractor Bristol. It is a spin-off of the HGTV series Flip or Flop. It premiered on April 6, 2017, and was filmed in Las Vegas, Nevada. On June 5, 2017, HGTV announced Flip or Flop Vegas would be renewed for a second season, with 16 episodes. The show was renewed for a third season and final season, which premiered March 21, 2019.

== Premise ==
On March 1, 2017, HGTV announced the Flip or Flop Franchise would expand to Las Vegas, Nevada. The show features a new couple, Bristol and Aubrey Marunde, flipping houses in Las Vegas, Nevada. Bristol and Aubrey have the same roles as Tarek and Christina in the original Flip or Flop.

== Hosts ==
Bristol and Aubrey Marunde are parents of two boys and have years of flipping experience. Aubrey is a real estate expert and designer, while Bristol is the contractor and handles design as well. Bristol is also a former MMA fighter.

== Episodes ==
=== Season 1 (2017) ===
No. overall	No. in season	Title	Original air date	Cost of home ($)	Closing cost ($)	Rehab cost ($)	Sale price ($)	Profit/loss ($)
1	1	"Cottage Glam"	April 6, 2017	156,000	15,000	21,600	243,000	+50,400
Flip location: Las Vegas, Nevada
2	2	"Building a Bachelor Pad"	April 13, 2017	192,000	9,000	30,000	279,000	+48,000
Flip location: Las Vegas, Nevada
3	3	"No Such Thing as a Safe Bet in Vegas"	April 17, 2017	160,000	15,000	17,600	243,000	+50,400
Flip location: Las Vegas, Nevada
4	4	"Bet Big, Win Big"	April 20, 2017	315,000	20,000	37,000	480,000	+108,000
Flip location: Henderson, Nevada
5	5	"Go Bold or Go Home"	April 27, 2017	210,000	12,000	24,000	290,000	+44,000
Flip location: Las Vegas, Nevada
6	6	"Nod to Mid-Century Mod"	May 4, 2017	195,000	10,800	23,000	269,800	+41,000
Flip location: Las Vegas, Nevada
7	7	"Foreclosure Goes Glam"	May 11, 2017	195,000	10,600	22,300	262,000	+34,000
Flip location: Las Vegas, Nevada
8	8	"Is It a House or a Prison?"	May 18, 2017	160,000	8,040	25,200	225,000	+31,660
Flip location: Las Vegas, Nevada
9	9	"From Cookie-Cutter to Custom"	May 25, 2017	188,000	9,952	21,000	248,000	+29,848
Flip location: Las Vegas, Nevada
10	10	"Rock and Roll Renovation"	June 1, 2017	125,000	7,160	16,000	179,000	+30,840
Flip location: Las Vegas, Nevada
11	11	"Beach Cottage in the Desert"	June 8, 2017	199,000	11,800	24,000	295,000	+60,200
Flip location: Las Vegas, Nevada
12	12	"Buyer's Remorse"	October 19, 2017	92,000	5,520	12,200	138,000	+37,280
Flip location: Las Vegas, Nevada The Marundes decided to rent the property for 6 months before selling it, and made $9,000 in rental income. They then listed the property and sold it. The $37,280 profit includes the $9,000 in rental income.
13	13	"Bank-Owned Disaster"	October 19, 2017	173,000	9,300	17,000	229,100	+29,800
Flip location: Las Vegas, Nevada
14	14	"Hitting the Wall"	October 26, 2017	206,000	11,400	24,500	285,000	+43,100
Flip location: Las Vegas, Nevada

=== Season 2 (2018) ===
No. overall	No. in season	Title	Original air date	Cost of home ($)	Closing cost ($)	Rehab cost ($)	Sale price ($)	Profit/loss ($)
16	1	"From Bank Owned to Industrial Vegas Gem"	March 15, 2018	227,000	11,700	21,100	292,000	+32,700
Flip location: Las Vegas, Nevada
17	2	"From 1960s Clunker to Modern Vegas Farmhouse"	March 22, 2018	270,000	12,000	85,000	N/A	N/A
Flip location: Las Vegas, Nevada The Marundes listed the home at $550,00, but did not receive any offers after two months. They lowered the list price to $525,000, but had not received offers as of the end of the episode.
18	3	"Sinking feeling"	March 29, 2018	200,000	12,320	23,500	308,000	+72,180
Flip location: Las Vegas, Nevada
19	4	"Dog Pound to Showstopper"	April 5, 2018	200,000	10,760	21,800	269,000	+36,440
Flip location: Henderson, Nevada
20	5	"Black-and-White Turnaround"	April 12, 2018	205,000	10,900	21,100	275,000	+38,000
Flip location: Las Vegas, Nevada
21	6	"Condo on the Vegas Strip"	April 19, 2018	117,000	6,000	10,800	154,000	+20,200
Flip location: Las Vegas, Nevada
22	7	"Short Sale Home Gets High-End Flip"	April 26, 2018	250,000	16,000	28,000	422,000	+128,000
Flip location: Las Vegas, Nevada
23	8	"Rustic Cabin Dream Home"	May 3, 2018	227,000	12,000	23,000	315,000	+53,000
Flip location: Las Vegas, Nevada
24	9	"Beat Up Townhouse"	May 10, 2018	188,000	9,900	17,000	249,000	+34,100
Flip location: Las Vegas, Nevada
25	10	"A Historic Mess"	May 17, 2018	106,000	17,000	78,000	425,000	+224,000
Flip location: Las Vegas, Nevada
26	11	"1980s Golf Club Home"	May 24, 2018	315,000	18,000	26,500	450,000	+90,500
Flip location: Las Vegas, Nevada
27	12	"Urban Art Condo"	May 24, 2018	122,000	6,800	12,300	170,000	+28,900
Flip location: Las Vegas, Nevada

=== Season 3 (2019) ===
No. overall	No. in season	Title	Original air date	Cost of home ($)	Closing cost ($)	Rehab cost ($)	Sale price ($)	Profit/loss ($)
28	1	"Design Nightmare"	March 21, 2019	320,000	18,300	64,000	459,000	+56,700
Flip location: Las Vegas, Nevada
29	2	"From Shed to Modern Cottage"	March 21, 2019	85,000	N/A	50,000	N/A	N/A
Flip location: Las Vegas, Nevada The Marundes decided to turn the property into a vacation rental income property rather than selling it.
30	3	"May I Have More Storage?"	March 28, 2019	129,000	7,000	12,400	175,000	+26,600
Flip location: Las Vegas, Nevada
31	4	"Vegas Beach House"	April 4, 2019	210,000	14,000	43,500	348,000	+80,500
Flip location: Las Vegas, Nevada
32	5	"Lucky in Vegas"	April 11, 2019	129,000	7,500	16,500	178,000	+25,000
Flip location: Las Vegas, Nevada
33	6	"Duplex Dilemma"	April 18, 2019	200,000	N/A	N/A	N/A	N/A
Flip location: Las Vegas, Nevada The Marundes were unable to sell the home at their desired price. They decided instead to turn it into a rental property due to its close vicinity to the local university.
34	7	"Vintage Vegas"	April 25, 2019	430,000	N/A	N/A	N/A	N/A
Flip location: Las Vegas, Nevada The Marundes were approached about renting the property out for a poker tournament. They accepted rather than selling the property.
35	8	"Bristol's Rustic Retreat"	April 25, 2019	192,000	10,900	19,800	265,000	+42,3000
Flip location: Las Vegas, Nevada
36	9	"Townhouse Redux"	May 2, 2019	205,000	10,710	18,990	268,000	+33,300
Flip location: Las Vegas, Nevada
37	10	"Bold Blue Condo"	May 2, 2019	179,000	9,000	17,500	228,000	+22,500
Flip location: Las Vegas, Nevada
