= Out of Control (2003 film) =

2003 Indian film by Apurva Asrani & Ramanjit Juneja

- Directed by: Apurva Asrani; Ramanjit "Tony" Juneja
- Written by: Rakesh Bakshi; Aman Jaffery; Bjolu Khan
- Produced by: Vashu Bhagnani
- Starring: Riteish Deshmukh; Hrishitaa Bhatt; Brande Roderick
- Cinematography: Neelaabh Kaul
- Edited by: Anthony Gonsalves
- Music by: Anand Raj Anand
- Production company: Pooja Entertainment
- Distributed by: Fox Star Studios
- Release date: 21 November 2003
- Running time: 128 minutes
- Country: India
- Language: Hindi

Out of Control is a 2003 Indian Hindi-language romantic comedy film starring Riteish Deshmukh, Hrishitaa Bhatt and American actress and model Brande Roderick.

== Plot ==
Jaswinder (Ritesh Deshmukh) goes to the United States, promising his parents that he will return soon and his sister's marriage will be set. In America, he meets an American girl named Sally (Brande Roderick) and marries her for his visa.

He forgets the promise he made to his parents. Meanwhile, in India, his parents have found him a new bride, Richa (Hrishitaa Bhatt). His sister calls him to India by telling him that their father has had a heart attack. He returns to India and gets engaged to Richa.

He strongly detests the idea but marries her and escapes to the United States and tells Sally that everything and everyone was fine in India. Back in India, his parents are amazed at his behaviour and Richa is surprised that her husband left soon after marriage, as he was supposed to take her to New York. Jaswinder's father (Amrish Puri) and Richa follow him to New York. As they reach New York, they are met by Flower (Satish Shah), who tells and inspires Richa to become a modern girl in her appearance. Jaswinder doesn't tolerate her and soon chucks her out. Sally does not know anything about this. But after some time, Jaswinder ends up falling in love with Richa and does not want to be separated from her. Will Sally find out? Will Jaswinder and Richa end up leading a happy life in the end? This plot forms the rest of the story.

== Cast ==
- Riteish Deshmukh as Jaswinder Singh Bedi / Jimmy
- Hrishitaa Bhatt as Richa Bedi
- Brande Roderick as Sally
- Anand Raj Anand
- Amrish Puri as Jatta Singh Bedi
- Satish Shah as Flower
- Satish Kaushik as Mango Singh
- Kenneth Mergen as Philip J. Roberts

== Soundtrack ==
All songs are written by Dev Kohli.

| # | Title | Singer(s) |
|---|---|---|
| 1 | "India Se" | Sonu Nigam |
| 2 | "Jodiyan Ban Gayi" | Adnan Sami, Udit Narayan |
| 3 | "Kudi Vi Soni" | Babul Supriyo, Udit Narayan |
| 4 | "Meri Jaan Mujhe Choo Le" | Remona |
| 5 | "Tera Chand Sa Ye Chehra" | Babul Supriyo, Shreya Ghoshal |
| 6 | "Tu Mera Pyar Hai Sanam" | Babul Supriyo, Suzanne |
| 7 | "USA Wich LA" | Sunidhi Chauhan, Shaan |

== Reception ==
Taran Adarsh of Bollywood Hungama opined that "On the whole, OUT OF CONTROL is a decent entertainer that will attract cinegoers in good numbers initially". A critic from Rediff.com said that "The film reeks of that 'been there, done that' feeling".
