= Rustic Rehab =

- Genre: Reality television
- Country of origin: United States
- Original language: English
- No. of seasons: 1
- No. of episodes: 9

Production
- Running time: 30 minutes

Original release
- Network: HGTV
- Release: August 16 – November 6, 2018

Rustic Rehab is a reality television series airing on HGTV hosted by real estate agents David and Chenoa Rivera in Paradise, California. It was initially announced on September 19, 2017 to be a spin-off of the HGTV series Flip or Flop. After the original plan of a premiere in April 2018, the show's first regular season episode aired on August 16, 2018.

What differentiates Rustic Rehab from other flipping shows is that the buyers are looking for second homes or vacation rentals.

After the town was devastated by the Camp Fire in 2018, the series was pulled from the HGTV schedule. However, the Riveras have been actively involved in rebuilding the town, investing in the building of new fireproof housing.

== Episodes ==
No. overall	No. in season	Title	Original air date	Cost of home ($)	Rehab cost ($)	Sale price ($)	Gross Profit/loss ($)
1	pilot	"Woodsy Retreat"	December 15, 2016	$95,000	$55,000	$219,000	$54,000
2	1	"Different Level of Renovations"	August 16, 2018	$146,000	$87,000	$279,000	$26,000
3	2	"Making It Out Alive"	August 23, 2018	$89,000	$138,500	$255,000	$9,650
4	3	"Abandoned Flip"	August 30, 2018	TBA	TBA	TBA	TBA
5	4	"Rescued from Foreclosure"	September 6, 2018	TBA	TBA	TBA	TBA
6	5	"Rustic or Rusted Out?"	October 30, 2018	TBA	TBA	TBA	TBA
7	6	"A Flipper's Dream?"	October 30, 2018	TBA	TBA	TBA	TBA
8	7	"I Can Smell the Potential"	November 6, 2018	TBA	TBA	TBA	TBA
9	8	"Panning for Sold"	November 6, 2018	TBA	TBA	TBA	TBA
