= Flip or Flop (franchise) =

American reality television franchise

- Title cards for the following series in the franchise. From left to right, top to bottom: Flip or Flop, Flip or Flop Follow-Up, Flip or Flop Vegas, Flip or Flop Atlanta, Flip or Flop Fort Worth, and Flip or Flop Nashville.
- Original work: Flip or Flop
- Years: 2013–present

Films and television
- Television series: Flip or Flop; Flip or Flop Follow-Up; Flip or Flop Vegas; Flip or Flop Chicago; Flip or Flop Nashville; Flip or Flop Atlanta; Flip or Flop Fort Worth; Christina on the Coast; Flipping 101

Miscellaneous
- Genre: Reality television

Flip or Flop is a television franchise of television programs. With the exception of Flip or Flop: Follow Up, each series follows a format, with couples in different parts of the United States purchasing homes, flipping them, and reselling.

As of December 29, 2017, 132 episodes of the Flip or Flop franchise have aired.

== Franchise overview ==
Series	Years	Television seasons										
Series	Years	2013	2014	2014-2015	2015-2016	2016	2017	2018	2019	2020	2021	2022
Flip or Flop	2013–2022	1	2	3	4	5	6	7	8	9	10	11
Flip or Flop Follow-Up	2015			1								
Flip or Flop Vegas	2017–2019						1	2	3			
Flip or Flop Atlanta	2017–2018						1	2				
Flip or Flop Fort Worth	2017–2018						1					
Flip or Flop Chicago	2017						Pilot					
Flip or Flop Nashville	2018–2019							1	2			
Christina on the Coast	2019-2025								1	2	3	4

== Hosts ==
Series	Host	Appearances							
Series	Host	Flip or Flop	Flip or Flop Follow-Up	Flip or Flop Vegas	Flip or Flop Atlanta	Flip or Flop Fort Worth	Flip or Flop Chicago	Flip or Flop Nashville	Christina on the Coast
Flip or Flop	Tarek El Moussa	Main							
Flip or Flop	Christina Hall	Main							Main
Flip or Flop Follow-Up	Tarek El Moussa	Main							
Flip or Flop Follow-Up	Christina Hall	Main							Main
Flip or Flop Vegas	Bristol Marunde			Main					
Flip or Flop Vegas	Aubrey Marunde			Main					
Flip or Flop Atlanta	Ken Corsini				Main				
Flip or Flop Atlanta	Anita Corsini				Main				
Flip or Flop Fort Worth	Andy Williams					Main			
Flip or Flop Fort Worth	Ashley Williams					Main			
Flip or Flop Chicago	Mark Perez						Main		
Flip or Flop Chicago	Liz Perez						Main		
Flip or Flop Nashville	DeRon Jenkins							Main	
Flip or Flop Nashville	Page Turner							Main	
Christina on the Coast	Christina Hall								Main

== Overview ==
Cities of Flip or Flop franchise
Flip or Flop Vegas
Flip or Flop Nashville
Flip or Flop Chicago
Flip or Flop Atlanta
Flip or Flop Fort Worth
Flip or Flop

=== Flip or Flop ===
The El Moussas were both real estate agents prior to the crash in 2008, and later they began flipping homes, mostly in Orange County, California.

In 2011, Tarek asked a friend to help him make an audition tape for HGTV. The friend filmed an entire episode of the process of house flipping from start to finish. The audition tape was sent to HGTV, and they were interested in talking to the couple. In 2012, HGTV signed the couple to a regular weekly program that shows the process of buying distressed property and renovating it.

Christina's expertise is primarily in design, while Tarek finds and renovates homes. The show follows them as they buy homes, typically bank-owned, short sales or foreclosures, to renovate and resell.

=== Flip or Flop Follow-Up ===
Flip or Flop Follow-Up premiered July 14, 2015. The show revisits old house flips from previous Flip or Flop episodes. The series goes deeper into the issues with the individual flips, and shows previously unaired footage. The series also updates on houses that remained unsold at the time of the original production. These three stories include a successful flip, a flop, and a follow-up that ends with Tarek and Christina revisiting one of their house flips. This series did not return for a season 2 making it the first series in the franchise to end.

=== Flip or Flop Vegas ===
Flip or Flop Vegas is a television series airing on HGTV hosted by real estate agents Bristol and Aubrey Marunde. Filmed in Las Vegas, Nevada, it premiered on April 6, 2017. On June 5, 2017, HGTV announced Flip or Flop Vegas would be renewed for a second season, with 16 episodes.

=== Flip or Flop Atlanta ===
Flip or Flop Atlanta is a television series airing on HGTV hosted by real estate agent Anita Corsini and contractor husband Ken. Filmed in the metro Atlanta, Georgia area, it premiered on July 20, 2017. On August 21, 2017, HGTV announced Flip or Flop Atlanta would be renewed for a second season, with 14 episodes, which is expected to debut in 2018.

=== Flip or Flop Nashville ===
Flip or Flop Nashville will be a television series airing on HGTV hosted by real estate agents DeRon Jenkins and Page Turner. It will premiere on January 18, 2018 and will be filmed in Nashville, Tennessee.

=== Flip or Flop Fort Worth ===
Flip or Flop Fort Worth is a television series airing on HGTV hosted by real estate agents Andy and Ashley Williams. Filmed in Dallas, Texas, it premiered on November 2, 2017.

=== Flip or Flop Chicago ===
On March 1, 2017, HGTV announced that "Flip or Flop" would expand to Chicago, Illinois. The show featured a new couple, Mark and Liz Perez, flipping houses in Chicago, Illinois. It premiered as a pilot on March 23, 2017.

=== Christina on the Coast ===
In June 2018 it was announced that Christina would be receiving her own spin off show known as Christina on the Coast. The series premiere will focus on Christina renovating her new home following her divorce; with the remaining seven episodes focusing on her fixing up other people's homes. Filming began in fall 2018, for a spring 2019 premiere. On February 13, 2019, it was announced that the series will premiere on May 23, 2019.

== See also ==
- Love It or List It (franchise)
- Property Brothers (franchise)
