= Christina on the Coast =

American reality television series

- Genre: Reality television
- Starring: Christina Haack
- Country of origin: United States
- Original language: English
- No. of seasons: 5
- No. of episodes: 61

Production
- Running time: 30 minutes
- Production company: Pie Town Productions

Original release
- Network: HGTV
- Release: May 23, 2019 – March 13, 2025

Related
- Flip or Flop (franchise)

Christina on the Coast is an American home renovation television series featuring Christina Hall, centered around properties in Southern California and produced by Pie Town Productions. In June 2018, HGTV announced that Hall would be receiving her own Flip or Flop spin-off series. The series premiere focused on Hall renovating her new home following her divorce; with the remaining seven episodes focusing on her fixing up other people's homes. Filming began in fall 2018, for a spring 2019 premiere. On February 13, 2019, it was announced that the series would premiere on May 23, 2019.

On November 26, 2019, it was announced that the second season would launch on January 2, 2020. Some episodes of Season 2 were delayed to 2021.

On July 17, 2020, it was announced that the third season would begin in Spring 2021. A fourth season was revealed to be premiering on December 8, 2022 by Hall, who also confirmed the spin-off show Christina in the Country, in November 2022. The fifth season premiered on July 11, 2024. The show was cancelled in July 2025.

== Episodes ==
Season	Episodes	Originally released	
Season	Episodes	First released	Last released
1	10	May 23, 2019	July 11, 2019
2	13	January 2, 2020	June 17, 2021
3	12	June 3, 2021	September 9, 2021
4	15	December 1, 2022	September 7, 2023
5	11	July 11, 2024	March 13, 2025

=== Season 1 (2019) ===
No. overall	No. in season	Title	Original release date	Viewers (millions)
1	1	"A New Kitchen For an Old Friend"	May 23, 2019	1.47
2	2	"Master Suite Makeover"	May 30, 2019	1.62
3	3	"A Colorful Kitchen Makeover"	June 6, 2019	1.34
4	4	"Tore Down From the Floor Down"	June 13, 2019	1.55
5	5	"Sweet Master Suite"	June 20, 2019	1.47
6	6	"Getting a New Kitchen Before Baby Number Two"	June 27, 2019	1.48
7	7	"Killer Kitchen for Mom"	July 11, 2019	1.40
Specials
8	8	"Wedding Special"	July 18, 2019	1.71
9	9	"My Perfect Paradise"	July 25, 2019	1.74
10	10	"Looking Back on an Incredible Year"	December 26, 2019	1.11

=== Season 2 (2020) ===
No. overall	No. in season	Title	Original release date	Viewers (millions)
11	1	"Firehouse Functional Kitchen"	January 2, 2020	1.44
12	2	"Pando Express"	January 9, 2020	1.24
13	3	"Counting Down to a Kitchen and a Baby"	January 16, 2020	1.33
14	4	"Blowing Out the Walls"	January 23, 2020	1.32
15	5	"Out with an Original Bathroom"	January 30, 2020	1.37
16	6	"Dysfunctional to Functional Kitchen"	August 6, 2020	1.38
17	7	"Wellness Remodel"	August 13, 2020	1.44
18	8	"Bold Kitchen for a Brit"	August 20, 2020	1.27
19	9	"A Marriage of Styles"	June 10, 2021	1.24
20	10	"A Touch of Indecision"	September 10, 2020	1.33
21	11	"A Clash of Style"	August 27, 2020	1.45
22	12	"New Design in the Old Hood"	June 17, 2021	1.23
23	13	"Industrial Kitchen with Boho Flair"	September 3, 2020	1.26

=== Season 3 (2021) ===
No. overall	No. in season	Title	Original release date	Viewers (millions)
24	1	"Midcentury Boho Home"	July 1, 2021	1.08
25	2	"Heartfelt Hacienda Makeover"	June 3, 2021	1.01
26	3	"Boho Industrial Bathroom"	June 24, 2021	1.06
27	4	"Modern Kitchen Meets Waterfront Dream"	July 8, 2021	1.34
28	5	"Tall Family, Big Reno"	July 15, 2021	1.28
29	6	"Reno Before Wedding"	September 9, 2021	0.92
30	7	"Home Run Reno"	July 22, 2021	1.18
31	8	"Midcentury Kitchen Reno"	August 19, 2021	1.38
32	9	"Pink Plight to Contemporary Delight"	August 5, 2021	0.89
33	10	"Massive Kitchen Makeover"	August 26, 2021	1.30
34	11	"Zen Kitchen Transformation"	September 2, 2021	1.18
35	12	"Traditional Meets Modern Kitchen"	August 12, 2021	1.12

=== Season 4 (2022–2023) ===
No. overall	No. in season	Title	Original release date	Viewers (millions)
36	1	"A New Outlook"	December 8, 2022	0.67
37	2	"More of the Warm Hug Home"	December 15, 2022	0.67
38	3	"Put Another Dime in the Jukebox"	December 22, 2022	0.67
39	4	"Big Family, Tiny Kitchen"	December 29, 2022	0.81
40	5	"Growing Families"	June 29, 2023	0.87
41	6	"A Dog's Life"	July 6, 2023	N/A
42	7	"Vacation Vibes"	July 13, 2023	N/A
43	8	"Delays for Days"	July 20, 2023	N/A
44	9	"Taking the Plunge"	July 27, 2023	N/A
45	10	"Friendship for Ages"	August 3, 2023	N/A
46	11	"Renew for Ocean View"	August 10, 2023	N/A
47	12	"Every Foot Counts"	August 17, 2023	N/A
48	13	"Always Upgrading"	August 24, 2023	N/A
49	14	"The 16 Year Kitchen"	August 31, 2023	N/A
50	15	"New Bathroom, New Baby"	September 7, 2023	N/A

=== Season 5 (2024) ===
No. overall	No. in season	Title	Original release date	Viewers (millions)
51	1	"Growing Up Christina"	July 11, 2024	0.67
52	2	"Surf En Suite"	July 18, 2024	0.67
53	3	"Starting From Scratch"	July 25, 2024	0.62
54	4	"Buckling Under the Timeline"	August 1, 2024	0.52
55	5	"Coastal Country Refresh"	August 8, 2024	0.55
56	6	"Historically Hip"	August 15, 2024	0.61
57	7	"No Walls, No Problems!"	August 22, 2024	0.63
58	8	"Lofty Ambitions"	August 29, 2024	0.51
59	9	"In the Dog House"	February 27, 2025	0.49
60	10	"Building Up and Going Over"	March 6, 2025	0.50
61	11	"Worth the Wait"	March 13, 2025	0.48
