= Flip or Flop Atlanta =

American reality television series

- Genre: Reality television
- Country of origin: United States
- Original language: English
- No. of seasons: 2
- No. of episodes: 28

Production
- Production location: Metro Atlanta
- Camera setup: Single-camera
- Running time: 30 minutes

Original release
- Network: HGTV
- Release: July 20, 2017 – December 6, 2018

Related
- Flip or Flop (franchise)

Flip or Flop Atlanta is a television series that originally aired on HGTV hosted by real estate agents Ken and Anita Corsini. It is a spin-off of the HGTV series Flip or Flop. It premiered on July 20, 2017 and was filmed in the Atlanta, Georgia area. On August 21, 2017, HGTV announced Flip or Flop Atlanta would be renewed for a second season, with 14 episodes, which premiered on September 13, 2018. On August 16, 2019, the Atlanta Journal-Constitution reported the show was canceled.

== Premise ==
On March 1, 2017, HGTV announced that Flip or Flop would expand to Atlanta, Georgia. The shows will feature a new couple, Ken and Anita Corsini, flipping houses in the Atlanta, Georgia area. The Corsinis have the same roles and functions that Tarek and Christina had held previously.

A pilot episode called Flipping the South aired on HGTV in May 2016. HGTV rebranded the show as part of an expansion of the Flip or Flop franchise.

== Hosts ==
Ken Corsini is a full-time real estate investor who lives in the suburbs of Atlanta with his wife Anita and their three children. He founded Georgia Residential Partners in 2005 and since that time has bought and sold over 500 properties.

Ken Corsini has a bachelor's degree in risk management from the University of Georgia as well as a master's degree in residential development from Georgia Tech.

Ken and Anita Corsini run a family business, renovating many houses a year in the Atlanta metro area.

== Episodes ==
=== Season 1 ===
No. overall	No. in season	Title	Original air date	Cost of home ($)	Rehab cost ($)	Sale price ($)	Gross Profit/loss ($)
1	1	"Big Money in Buckhead"	July 20, 2017	$400,000	$120,000	$684,000	$164,000
Flip location: Buckhead, Atlanta
2	2	"Big Build on the Atlanta Beltline"	July 27, 2017	$489,000	$120,000	$799,000	$190,000
Flip location: Atlanta Beltline in Atlanta, Georgia
3	3	"From Trash to Rustic Treasure"	August 3, 2017	$110,000	$90,000	$299,000	$99,000
Flip location: Stone Mountain, Georgia
4	4	"Small Farmhouse with Big Flop Potential"	August 10, 2017	$100,000	$95,000	$220,000	$25,000
Flip location: Atlanta, Georgia
5	5	"Rundown Rental House Redo"	August 17, 2017	$108,000	$65,000	$273,500	$100,500
Flip location: Smyrna, Georgia
6	6	"From a Frog to a Prince"	August 24, 2017	$79,500	$69,000	$180,000	$31,500
Flip location: Decatur, Georgia
7	7	"1970s Estate Sale Gem"	August 31, 2017	$50,000	$55,000	$155,000	$50,000
Flip location: Austell, Georgia
8	8	"Frankenstein House to Craftsman Cutie"	September 7, 2017	$115,000	$100,000	$242,000	$27,000
Flip location: Scottdale, Georgia
9	9	"Small House, Big Ideas and Funky Design Touches"	September 14, 2017	$112,000	$60,000	$232,000	$60,000
Flip location: East Atlanta
10	10	"Shut Down in a New Town"	September 21, 2017	$65,000	$55,000	$164,000	$44,000
Flip location: Tucker, Georgia
11	11	"From Junky to Funky"	September 28, 2017	$145,000	$65,200	TBA	TBA
Flip location: East Atlanta
12	12	"Small Budget, Big Kitchen"	October 5, 2017	$142,000	$50,000	$260,000	$68,000
Flip location: Marietta, Georgia
13	13	"Tiles Gone Wild"	October 12, 2017	$160,000	$72,000	$301,500	$69,500
Flip location: Atlanta, Georgia
14	14	"Southern Home Rescue"	TBA	$60,000	$80,000	$240,000	$100,000
Flip location: Marietta, Georgia

=== Season 2 ===
No. overall	No. in season	Title	Original air date	Cost of home ($)	Rehab cost ($)	Sale price ($)	Gross Profit/loss ($)
15	1	"Close to home"	October 11, 2018	50,000	105,000	TBA	TBA
Flip location: Woodstock, Georgia Received an offer for 290,000 but decided they did not want to sell the house and kept it.
16	2	"Duplex or Don't Plex"	October 11, 2018	150,000	103,000	380,000	110,000
Flip location: Atlanta, Georgia
17	3	"Manor Makeover"	October 18, 2018	220,000	91,000	535,000	195,500
Flip location: Conyers, Georgia
18	4	"Not so Funhouse"	October 18, 2018	75,000	80,000	280,000	119,000
Flip location: West End, Atlanta
19	5	"Go Bigger or Go Home"	October 25, 2018	77,000	133,000	346,000	126,000
Flip location: East Lake, Atlanta
20	6	"The Cabin in the Woods"	October 25, 2018	92,500	73,000	257,000	83,500
Flip location: Pine Lake, Georgia
21	7	"This Old Boarding House"	November 1, 2018	57,000	103,500	299,000	123,500
Flip location: Oakland City, Atlanta
22	8	"Trash or Treasure"	November 1, 2018	140,000	94,500	320,000	85,500
Flip location: Alpharetta, Georgia
23	9	"99 Problems"	November 8, 2018	99,000	91,000	269,900	69,900
Flip location: Decatur, Georgia
24	10	"No Strike Outs in Mozley Park"	November 15, 2018	82,000	97,500	265,000	74,500
Flip location: Mozley Park
25	11	"Making History"	November 29, 2018	137,000	80,000	345,000	118,000
Flip location: College Park, Georgia
26	12	"Smells Like Trouble"	November 29, 2018	112,000	77,000	265,000	73,000
Flip location: Gresham Park, Georgia
27	13	"That '70s House"	December 6, 2018	150,000	102,500	440,000	174,500
Flip location: Milton, Georgia
28	14	"Little House of Hoarders"	December 6, 2018	85,000	97,500	280,000	84,000
Flip location: Woodstock, Georgia
