= USA Rock Paper Scissors League =

Organized rock paper scissors competition

The United States of America Rock Paper Scissors League was a national competition league for the hand game rock paper scissors. The first national champion was crowned on April 9, 2006, at the USARPS League Championship, which was held at the Mandalay Bay Hotel in Las Vegas, Nevada and televised by the A&E Network on June 12. Mario Anastasov (the champion) was awarded a $50,000 cash prize.

The 2007 USARPS League National Championship aired on ESPN2 on July 7. Trey Wingo and "Master Roshambollah" (Jason Simmons) hosted, Leeann Tweeden was the tableside reporter, and Phil Gordon was the head referee. Michael Federico, of Las Vegas, beat David Borne in the final match to win first place and the $50,000 grand prize. Contestants came from across the nation to compete in Las Vegas.

The league was developed by marketer Matti Leshem, who as of 2009 remained the league's commissioner.

A 2014 web article quoted Simmons as saying the League was defunct.
