= Ultimate Collectors =

- Genre: Reality
- Presented by: Kevin Flynn
- Country of origin: United States
- Original language: English
- No. of seasons: 2
- No. of episodes: 26

Production
- Producer: Cindy Connors
- Production companies: Bender Creative; Glass Entertainment Group

Original release
- Network: HGTV
- Release: October 2, 2002 – 2003

Ultimate Collectors is a reality television show hosted by Kevin Flynn on HGTV focusing on various collections and collectors that aired from 2002 to 2003. It was produced by Bender Creative and Glass Entertainment Group. Cindy Connors served as a producer.

Season one premiered on October 2, 2002.

== Cast ==
- Host: Kevin Flynn

== Episodes ==
=== First Season ===
- Episode UTC-101: The Wizard of Oz, Surfboards, Shakers, Pinball Machines
- Episode UTC-102: Spider-Man, Smiley Faces, Packards, Kitchen Collectibles
- Episode UTC-103: Hot Wheels, Barbie, Presidential Autographs, Carousel Horses
- Episode UTC-104: M&Ms, Corvettes, Auto Instruments
- Episode UTC-105: Star Wars, Flamingos, Typewriters, James Bond
- Episode UTC-106: Statue of Liberty, Transferware, Buttons, Matchbooks
- Episode UTC-107: Firefighter Memorabilia, G.I. Joes, Cowboy Kitsch
- Episode UTC-108: Rock 'n' Roll, Toys, Perfume Bottles, Bananas
- Episode UTC-109: Marbles, Head Vases, Everything Purple and Vintage Drums
- Episode UTC-110: Peanuts Cartoons, Disney Pins, Clown Keepsakes
- Episode UTC-111: Normandy Memorabilia, Vacuum Cleaners and Board Games
- Episode UTC-112: Elvis, Reamers, Cats and Miniature Pianos
- Episode UTC-113: B-Movie Memorabilia, Garfield and Tiki Collectibles

=== Second Season ===
- Episode UTC-201: Vintage Diners, Trains, Pixieware and Sewing Machines
- Episode UTC-202: Mr. Peanut, Slot Machines, Banks and Old Photography
- Episode UTC-203: Beatles, Mini Souvenir Buildings and Wee Forest Folk
- Episode UTC-204: Monkees Memorabilia, Yo-Yos, Hats and Teddy Bears
- Episode UTC-205: Marilyn Monroe, Automobilia, Tins and Pincushions
- Episode UTC-206: Brooklyn Dodgers Memorabilia, Cartoon Glasses, Coca-Cola Memorabilia and Mouse Pads
- Episode UTC-207: Raggedy Ann, American Flags, Art Glass and Little Golden Books
- Episode UTC-208: Planet of the Apes and The Simpsons Memorabilia, Sock Monkeys and Gumball Machines
- Episode UTC-209: Antique Tools, Lassie Memorabilia, Lunchboxes and Antique Radios
- Episode UTC-210: Charlie's Angels Memorabilia, Puzzles, Coins and Cow Figurines
- Episode UTC-211: Pez Dispensers, Superman Memorabilia, Pandas and Tim Burton Movie Memorabilia
- Episode UTC-212: TV Costumes, Mighty Mouse, Smurfs and Antiques of the Future
- Episode UTC-213: Batman Memorabilia, Legos, Advertising Icons and Fountain Pens
