= Designers' Challenge =

HGTV television series

- Presented by: Chris Harrison
- Country of origin: United States

Original release
- Network: HGTV

Designers' Challenge is a show that aired on HGTV in the United States. In each episode, three interior designers make presentations to a homeowner, who chooses one design to use in the house. It was hosted by Chris Harrison.

Landscapers' Challenge is a spin-off that deals with outdoor landscaping.
