= Christina Haack =

American real estate investor and TV personality (born 1983)

- Born: Christina Meursinge Haack; July 9, 1983 (age 43); Anaheim, California, U.S.
- Other names: Christina El Moussa; Christina Anstead; Christina Hall
- Education: San Diego State University
- Occupations: Real estate investor; TV personality
- Spouses: Tarek El Moussa (m. 2009; div. 2018) Ant Anstead (m. 2018; div. 2021) Josh Hall (m. 2021; div. 2025)
- Partner: Christopher Larocca (2024-present)
- Children: 3

Christina Meursinge Haack (born July 9, 1983) is an American real estate investor and TV personality. She co-starred on HGTV's show Flip or Flop (2013–2022) alongside Tarek El Moussa and her own shows Christina on the Coast (2019–2025), Christina: Stronger by Design (2021) and Christina in the Country (2022).

== Early life ==
Christina Meursinge Haack was born in Anaheim, California. She has a sister, Carly, who is ten years younger. She went to school in southern California and graduated from Canyon High School in Anaheim, California in 2001 and began working in the real estate industry after graduating from San Diego State University.

== Career ==
=== 2005–2010: Real estate ===
In 2005, she first met future husband and business partner Tarek El Moussa while the two were working as real estate agents at Prudential, where they worked until 2008. The couple ran the real-estate agency Tarek and Christina: The El Moussa Group in Orange County, California. The husband-and-wife team sold real estate in the southern California area. When the housing market plummeted after the October 2008 stock market crash, their real estate business suffered. The El Moussas went from living in a $6,000-per-month house to a $700-per-month apartment in just a few years.

In 2010, the El Moussas, along with their business partner Pete De Best, bought their first investment property in Santa Ana, California for $115,000, selling the property for a profit of $34,000. The trio continued to flip houses, expanding their real-estate investing business into Arizona and Nevada. The El Moussa Group was dissolved in 2018. The business is now owned by Tarek and Associates, a sole venture of Tarek El Moussa.

=== 2011–present: Success in television ===
In 2011, Tarek El Moussa asked a friend to help him make an audition tape for HGTV. Pie Town Productions expressed interest in the tape. HGTV producers had also noticed the couple's Instagram profile, which featured before and after profiles of several renovation projects. In 2012, HGTV signed the couple to produce a show for the network. In April 2013, Flip or Flop debuted on the network. In a 2014 interview, Haack said, "Each episode shows things that can go wrong, and do go wrong". Flip or Flop ran for ten seasons and the last episode aired on December 1, 2022.

In 2017, Haack presented at the Daytime Emmy Awards. In June 2018, it was announced that she would be featured in her own spin-off show, Christina on the Coast. The first episode of season 1 focused on Haack renovating her new post-divorce home, with the remaining seven episodes focusing on her renovating other people's homes. Filming began in the fall 2018, for a spring 2019 premiere. The show's second season premiered on January 2, 2020, on HGTV.

On May 15, 2024, it was announced that Haack is set to star in a new competition reality series, The Flip Off for HGTV. Haack appears in the series with ex-husband Josh Hall, former husband Tarek El Moussa and his second wife Heather Rae El Moussa. The show was supposed to follow the two couples in a competition to find, buy, renovate and flip a house for the biggest financial gain. However, upon the first episode release (January 2025), it has been shared online that Josh Hall will not be in future episodes, leaving the competition to be only between the El Moussa couple, and Haack as a solo competitor.

In October 2024, Haack and Kylie Wing founded Christina & Kylie, an interior design and home furnishing company.

== Other ventures ==
On April 14, 2020, Haack released a nutrition book, The Wellness Remodel: A Guide to Rebooting How You Eat, Move, and Feed Your Soul, with certified nutritionist Cara Clark. The book includes 60 healthy recipes. In the book, Haack also discusses her health journey, including struggles with infertility, and stress of going through a divorce while raising kids.

On July 14, 2020, Haack announced she will be partnering with Spectra Furniture to create a furniture line for the brand. The new line, Christina HOME, debuted in October 2020. In November 2021, Hall created a luxury vinyl flooring line, The Christina Collection, that features 21 different colors and styles.

List of product lines by Hall
Year	Title	Brand	Notes
2020	"Christina Hall x The Lace Project"	The Lace Project	Jewelry collection
2020	"Christina HOME"	Spectra Furniture	Furniture line
2021	"Christina Collection"		Vinyl flooring line

== Public image ==
During her career, Haack has been featured in numerous publications including Good Housekeeping, Elle Decor, Runner's World and the Orange County Register. She has also appeared on the cover of HGTV magazine and People.

== Personal life ==
=== Relationships and children ===
In October 2006, Haack began dating Tarek El Moussa, and the couple married in 2009. Their daughter, Taylor Reese,was born in 2010 and their son, Brayden James, was born in 2015. In 2013, Tarek was diagnosed with both thyroid and testicular cancer. When doctors recommended radiation treatment, the couple decided to bank Tarek's sperm and try in-vitro fertilization to have a second child. The first attempt failed and Christina suffered a miscarriage on the second try. She became pregnant with their son in 2015.

In May 2016, the couple separated after an incident at their Southern California home. Tarek was found by the police on a nearby hiking trail and was in possession of a handgun. He maintained he was not suicidal and had simply gone for a hike, taking a gun to protect himself from wild animals. Tarek and Christina filed for divorce in 2017 and the divorce was finalized in January 2018.

In November 2017, Haack began dating English television presenter Ant Anstead. On December 22, 2018, she married Anstead at their Newport Beach, California home and officially took his surname. She gave birth to their son on September 6, 2019. They announced their separation on September 18, 2020, and she filed for divorce in November. The divorce proceedings were tumultuous and the couple continue to mention each other in the media. Haack reverted to her maiden name. The divorce was finalized in June 2021. On April 28, 2022, Anstead filed for full custody of their son, accusing Haack of exploiting their son on social media. A judge later ruled that the couple would continue "to have joint legal and joint physical custody".

In July 2021, People magazine announced that Haack was dating realtor Joshua Hall, and the couple got engaged that September. The couple privately married in October 2021. On April 5, 2022, media outlets reported that the couple married, and she took his surname. On September 3, 2022, the couple married a second time in Hawaii. On July 8, 2024, the couple separated and subsequently filed for divorce. In October 2024, Haack reverted to her maiden name as a result of her divorce from Hall.

=== Health ===
In December 2022, Haack said that she had undergone quantum biofeedback machine testing at an alternative medicine center, and the results showed she had been diagnosed with "mercury and lead poisoning", which she believed was caused by remodeling and flipping "gross" houses. She also believed her illnesses might be attributed to breast implants. In addition, she said that she had been diagnosed with small intestinal bacterial overgrowth which she intended to treat with herbs and intravenous treatments.

== Filmography ==
As herself
Year	Title	Role	Notes
2013–2022	Flip or Flop	Co–host	146 episodes
2013–2014	Brother vs. Brother	Judge	7 episodes
2015	Flip or Flop Follow-Up	Host	3 episodes
2019	Buddy vs. Duff	Special guest	
2019–2025	Christina on the Coast	Host	36 episodes; Also as executive producer
2021	Christina: Stronger by Design	Host	4 episodes
2022	Christina in the Country	Host	6 episodes; Also as executive producer
2023	Barbie Dreamhouse Challenge	Contestant	3 episodes
2025-present	The Flip Off		6 episodes

== Published works ==
- Anstead, Christina; Clark, Cara. The Wellness Remodel: A Guide to Rebooting How You Eat, Move, and Feed Your Soul (2020). HarperCollins.
