= Pantofola d'Oro =

Italian shoe and clothing company

Pantofola d’Oro
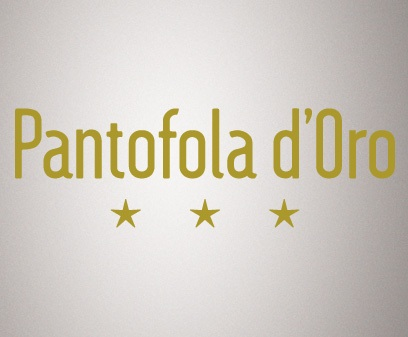
- Industry: Football boots, clothing, leisure footwear
- Founded: 1886; 140 years ago in Ascoli Piceno, Italy
- Headquarters: Italy
- Key people: Emidio Lazzarini
- Products: football boots and men's fashion
- Website: www.pantofoladoro.com

Pantofola d’Oro is an Italian manufacturer of football boots, clothing and leisure footwear.

The company can trace its roots back to 1886, when the old Lazzarini cobbler's shop was founded in Ascoli Piceno, Italy, although it has only been making football boots and trainers since the 1950s.

During the fifties, Emidio Lazzarini took over the business from his father. Emidio Lazzarini was a wrestler and decided he would make his own wrestling shoes.

Having spent some time making hand-made shoes for wrestling, Emidio Lazzarini contacted the local football team, A.S. Ascoli (better-known today as Ascoli Calcio 1898) and began making customised football boots for the team. Many of the team's players at the time became his regular clients.
