= Arlington Heights, Fort Worth, Texas =

Neighborhood in Fort Worth, Texas

Coordinates: 32°44′11″N 97°22′58″W

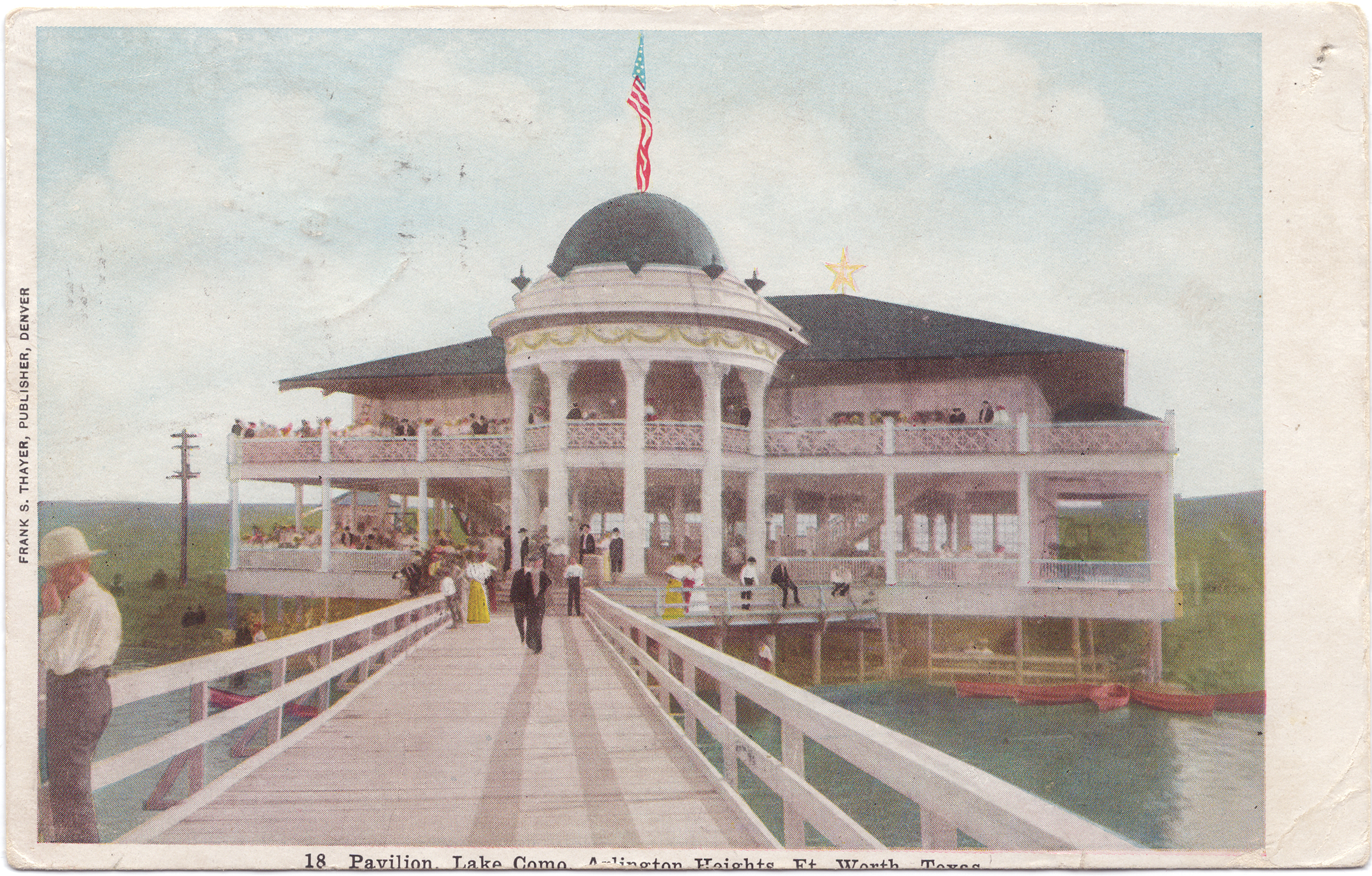
Postcard of a pavilion and Lake Como in Arlington Heights, 1907

Arlington Heights is a neighborhood in Fort Worth, Texas.

A Denver, Colorado-originating promoter named H. B. Chamberlain bought 2,000 acres (810 ha) of land from a Chicago financier named Tom Hurley and Robert McCart. He attempted to develop Arlington Heights, but a hotel he built, Ye Arlington Inn, burned in 1894, and he died in a bicycle accident in London. Arlington Heights was developed after the United States moved military personnel to the surrounding area in World War I.

Joyce E. Williams, a sociologist who wrote Black Community Control: A Study of Transition in a Texas Ghetto, wrote that almost all Lake Como women worked in Arlington Heights. Those women referred to it as "Little California", a reference to a fantasy idea of the state of California.

== Education ==
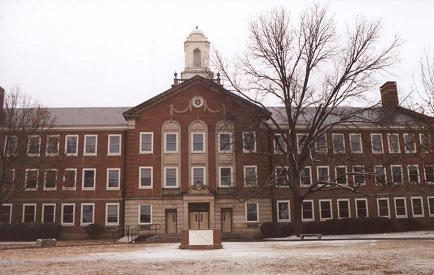
Arlington Heights High School

The Fort Worth Independent School District serves Arlington Heights. North Hi-Mount Elementary School serves Arlington Heights. Arlington Heights High School is in the community.
