= Love in the Time of Monsters =

- Film poster
- Directed by: Matt Jackson
- Written by: Michael Skvarla
- Produced by: Andy Gunn
- Starring: Doug Jones; Kane Hodder; Mike McShane; Shawn Weatherly; Heather Rae El Moussa
- Cinematography: Jorge L. Urbina
- Edited by: Todd Zelin
- Music by: Rob Gokee
- Production company: TBC Films
- Distributed by: Indican Pictures; TBC Films
- Release dates: March 8, 2014 (Cinequest Film Festival); February 17, 2015 (U.S.)
- Running time: 97 minutes
- Country: United States
- Language: English

Love in the Time of Monsters is a 2014 comedy horror film directed by Matt Jackson and starring Doug Jones, Kane Hodder, Mike McShane, Shawn Weatherly and Heather Rae El Moussa (under her maiden name Heather Rae Young). It was produced and distributed by TBC Films and Indican Pictures respectively. It premiered at the Cinequest Film Festival and was released on DVD and VOD in the U.S. and Canada on February 17, 2015.

The title is a play on Love in the Time of Cholera, a novel by Gabriel García Márquez.

== Cast ==
- Doug Jones as Dr. Lincoln
- Kane Hodder as Lou
- Mike McShane as Slavko
- Shawn Weatherly as Marianna
- Heather Rae El Moussa as Brandi
- Gena Shaw as Marla
- Marissa Skell as Carla

== Production ==
Filming began on May 3, 2012, in northern California (Gasquet and Klamath).

== Marketing ==
The official trailer was released in April, 2013.

The tagline is "True love can get real ugly."

== Release ==
Love premiered on March 8, 2014, at the Cinequest Film Festival in San Jose, California.

== Reception ==
Dread Central was enthusiastic about "the sheer amount of charm and fun that is crammed into this movie": "Jackson has crafted an incredibly funny, rich, and ultimately entertaining movie with enough heart to keep you hooked till the end. ... It's a perfect combination of cheesy love story and campy monster movie. ... A lot of my enjoyment from the film comes from how over-the-top it goes, while still maintaining a human element with the love story goofiness. A movie that starts with standard love drama goes to zombies, goose zombies, moose zombies, hordes of squirrel zombies, Abraham Lincoln scientist, Russian immigrant Uncle Sam, and an actual Bigfoot showdown."

The Best Horror Movies review was also strongly positive, describing Love as "a highly entertaining film" with "smart and witty" dialogue. Two rave reviews appeared at Aberrant Films, with Spider Santana giving it a 10/10 rating (calling it a "campy little gem") and Sky Tallone a 9/10 ("unlike your traditional campy horror-comedy, this story actually has very compelling characters with well-defined relationships, romances, back stories, personal struggles, and well-written dialogue"). The Undead Review gave the movie a 4.5/5 rating, calling it "a strange, hilarious, and yet still chilling film that I would highly recommend."
