= Flipping 101 w/ Tarek El Moussa =

- Also known as: Flipping 101
- Genre: Reality television
- Starring: Tarek El Moussa
- Country of origin: United States
- Original language: English
- No. of seasons: 4
- No. of episodes: 30

Production
- Executive producer: Kent Llewellyn

Original release
- Network: HGTV
- Release: August 23, 2021 – April 24, 2025

Related
- Flip or Flop

Flipping 101 with Tarek El Moussa is a reality television series airing on HGTV. It features real estate agent Tarek El Moussa, best known for his previous show Flip or Flop, mentoring real estate novices wanting to learn the secrets of a successful house flip. The show premiered in 2020 and was given a one-hour format for its second season in 2021. The show was renewed for a fourth season, which premiered in 2025.

== Episodes ==
=== Series overview ===
Season	Episodes	Originally released	
Season	Episodes	First released	Last released
1	14	March 5, 2020	October 8, 2020
2	10	September 16, 2021	November 18, 2021
3	11	May 4, 2023	December 19, 2023

=== Season 1 (2020) ===
No. overall	No. in season	Title	Original release date	U.S. viewers (millions)
1	1	"Tragic Accident or Calculated Murder?"	March 5, 2020	N/A
2	2	"Fighting All the Way to the Bank"	March 12, 2020	N/A
3	3	"That New Flipper Smell"	March 19, 2020	N/A
4	4	"Broken Slab to Totally Fab"	March 26, 2020	N/A
5	5	"The Craziest Ceiling in Compton"	April 9, 2020	N/A
6	6	"Failing to Plan is Planning to Fail"	April 16, 2020	N/A
7	7	"Dancing With Disaster"	April 23, 2020	N/A
8	8	"A Flipping Family Nightmare"	April 30, 2020	N/A
9	9	"A Horrible Hoarder House"	May 14, 2020	N/A
10	10	"A Baptism By Fire"	May 21, 2020	N/A
11	11	"Communication Breakdown"	September 17, 2020	N/A
12	12	"Bad Energy BoHo"	September 24, 2020	N/A
13	13	"Style vs. Substance"	October 1, 2020	N/A
14	14	"Going Off the Market"	October 8, 2020	N/A

=== Season 2 (2021) ===
No. overall	No. in season	Title	Original release date	U.S. viewers (millions)
15	1	"Gambling with the Rules"	September 16, 2021	1.08
16	2	"101 Graduates Take on Studio City"	September 23, 2021	1.02
17	3	"Location, Location, Laundromat"	September 30, 2021	1.13
18	4	"Home Over Improvement"	October 7, 2021	0.91
19	5	"Pilots and Permits and Babies, Oh My!"	October 14, 2021	1.03
20	6	"High Desert to High Risk"	October 21, 2021	1.11
21	7	"Hope the Buyers Have a Dog"	October 28, 2021	1.04
22	8	"Up Against a Brick Wall"	November 4, 2021	1.01
23	9	"Posts, Beams and Bold Designs"	November 11, 2021	0.93
24	10	"Ups and Downs in the Hills"	November 18, 2021	0.90

=== Season 3 (2023) ===
No. overall	No. in season	Title	Original release date	U.S. viewers (millions)
25	1	"Three Buds and a Baby"	May 4, 2023	N/A
26	2	"Married to the Flip"	May 11, 2023	N/A
27	3	"The Never-Ending Flip"	May 18, 2023	N/A
28	4	"The Addition Decision"	May 25, 2023	N/A
29	5	"Piecemealing a Budget"	June 15, 2023	N/A
30	6	"A Costly Venice Flip"	November 14, 2023	N/A
31	7	"This Flipping Relationship"	November 21, 2023	N/A
32	8	"A Flipping Side Hustle"	November 28, 2023	N/A
33	9	"A Million Dollar Hoarder Home"	December 5, 2023	N/A
34	10	"To ADU or Not to ADU"	December 12, 2023	N/A
35	11	"A Big Step Up from Condos"	December 19, 2023	N/A
