= Tarek El Moussa =

TV personality and real estate investor

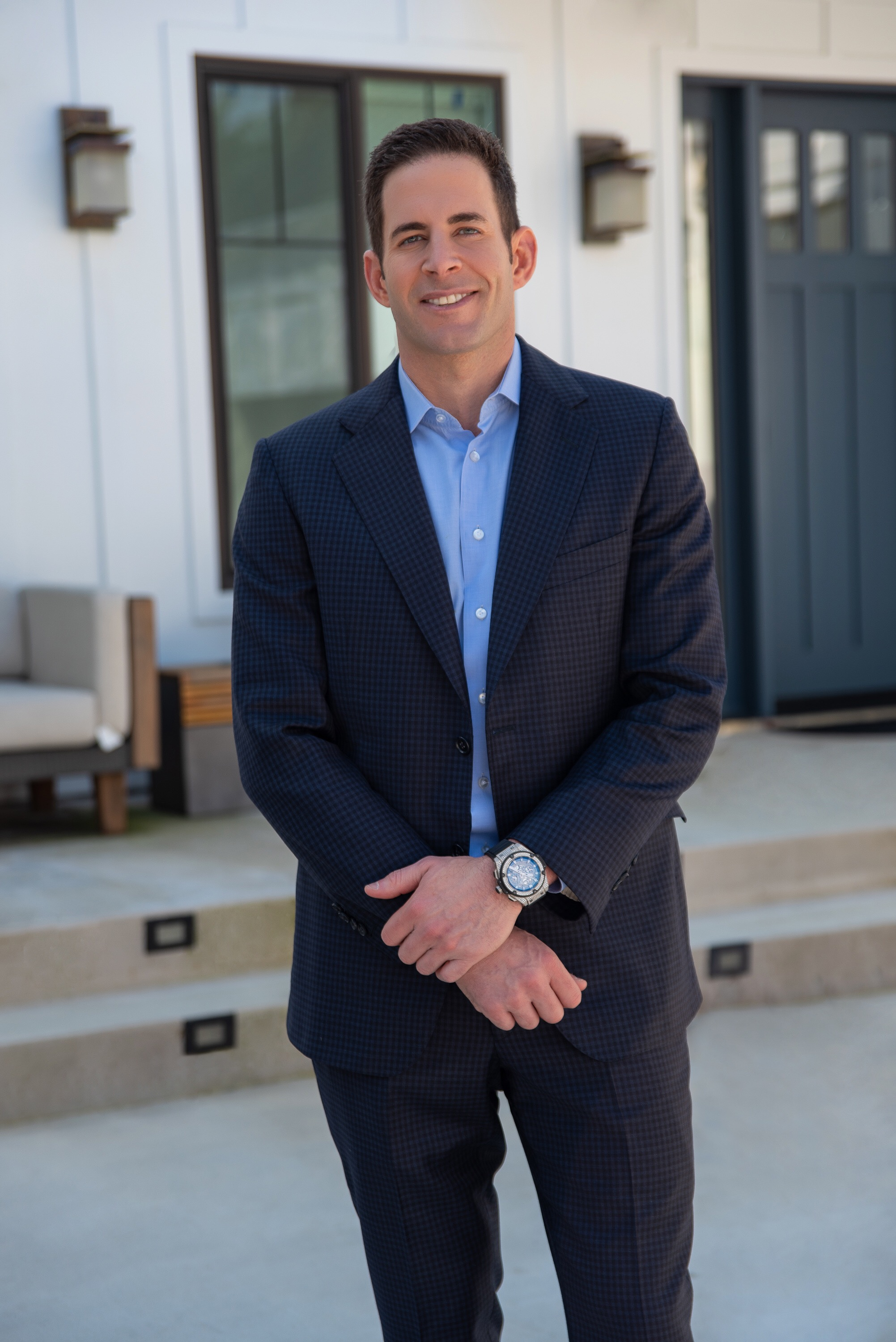
- El Moussa in 2019
- Born: Tarek Gustave El Moussa; August 21, 1981 (age 44); Long Beach, California, U.S.
- Occupations: Real estate investor; TV personality
- Known for: Flip or Flop; Flipping 101 with Tarek El Moussa
- Spouses: Christina Haack (m. 2009; div. 2018) Heather Rae Young (m. 2021)
- Children: 3

Tarek Gustave El Moussa (born August 21, 1981) is an American real estate investor and TV personality widely known for co-hosting HGTV's Flip or Flop alongside his then-wife Christina Haack. The pair found success flipping houses as an alternative to their previous business of selling real estate, which took a hit during the 2008 financial crisis.

== Early life ==
Tarek Gustave El Moussa was born on August 21, 1981, to a Lebanese father, whose family migrated to Egypt, and a Belgian mother, in Long Beach, California. In 2000, he graduated from Sunny Hills High School in Fullerton, California. He has an older sister.

== Career ==
El Moussa got his real estate license in 2002, at the age of 21. He had a lucrative career selling real estate until the 2008 financial crisis, when the business he shared with his then-wife, Christina Haack, began to struggle. At that time, the couple had no choice but to give up their $6,000/month home to move to a $700/month apartment. The pair then ventured into a new real estate strategy - flipping houses. During their first flip, El Moussa submitted an audition tape to HGTV that followed the pair's process of flipping a house. The network picked up the show, which has seen a popular 10-season run, with season 10 premiering on HGTV in December 2021.

Despite the couple's divorce, they continued working together on Flip or Flop, with Tarek saying to People, "From the beginning, HGTV has shown Christina and me tremendous support and we are excited to go out there and flip many more houses for Flip or Flop."

In 2020, El Moussa launched a second HGTV show, Flipping 101 with Tarek El Moussa, in which he serves as a mentor to novice house-flippers. On December 2, 2022, he and his second wife Heather Rae shared a first look at their 2023 show The Flipping El Moussas, which premiered on March 2, 2023.

== Personal life ==
He married Christina Haack in May 2009. The couple met while working at a real estate office, later entering into business together. Their daughter was born on September 22, 2010. Their son was born on August 20, 2015. In 2013, Tarek was diagnosed with thyroid cancer. A Flip or Flop viewer, nurse Ryan Read, "noticed that at certain angles, at certain times, it just caught my eye that Tarek had a lump on his throat" and contacted producers. Tarek has been in remission since 2014. Tarek and Christina divorced in 2018.

El Moussa started dating former Playboy Playmate and real estate agent Heather Rae Young in 2019. They married October 23, 2021, at the Rosewood Miramar Beach Hotel in Montecito. The wedding was the subject of the Discovery+ special Tarek and Heather: The Big I Do. Tarek announced their son's birth on January 31, 2023, on Instagram.

== Filmography ==
As himself
Year	Title	Role	Notes
2013–2022	Flip or Flop	Co-host	149 episodes
2013–2014	Brother vs. Brother	Himself and Judge	7 episodes
2015	Flip or Flop Follow-Up	Host	3 episodes
2017–2024	Entertainment Tonight	Guest and guest co-host	19 episodes
2019, 2021	Rock the Block	Himself and Judge	2 episodes
2019	Face the Truth	Panelist	1 episode
2020–2025	Flipping 101 with Tarek El Moussa	Host	27 episodes
2021–2022	Selling Sunset	Himself	2 episodes
2021	Tarek & Heather: The Big I Do	Himself	Discovery+ special
2021	Tarek's Flip Side	Host	4 episodes
2023	The Flipping El Moussas	Host	8 episodes
