= Flip or Flop =

American reality television series

- Genre: Reality television
- Starring: Tarek El Moussa; Christina Haack
- Country of origin: United States
- Original language: English
- No. of seasons: 10
- No. of episodes: 155 (list of episodes)

Production
- Running time: 30 minutes
- Production company: Pie Town Productions

Original release
- Network: HGTV
- Release: April 16, 2013 – March 17, 2022

Related
- Flip or Flop (franchise)

Flip or Flop is an American television series that aired on HGTV, hosted by the formerly-married couple Tarek El Moussa and Christina Haack. The program was the original show in the Flip or Flop franchise, debuting in 2013.

Early seasons of the series featured fellow HGTV series personality Isreal 'Izzy' Battres, principal of Battres Construction, before he went on to appear in his own short-lived HGTV series, 'Izzy Does It'.

On November 5, 2020, the series was renewed for a tenth season, which premiered on December 2, 2021. It was later announced that the series would end after ten seasons on March 17, 2022, but that hosts El Moussa and Haack would continue to work on their solo series.

== Premise ==
Christina Haack and Tarek El Moussa were married real estate agents in Orange County, California. After the real estate crash in 2008, they began flipping homes in the Orange County area.

In 2011, Tarek asked a friend to help him make an audition tape for HGTV, filming an entire episode of the process of house flipping from start to finish. The audition tape was sent to HGTV and in 2012 the couple was signed to make Flip or Flop.

Christina's expertise is primarily in design, and she works with Tarek to find and renovate homes. She handles the designs of the new spaces and keeps the project on schedule. The show follows them as they buy homes, typically bank-owned, short sales or foreclosures, to renovate and resell.

== Hosts ==
=== Personal lives ===
Tarek El Moussa and his ex-wife turned business partner Christina Haack met while working in the real estate industry. When the housing market plummeted due to the 2008 financial crisis they went from living in a $6,000 per month home to a $700 per month apartment, inspiring them to focus on flipping houses. The couple married in 2009, and their daughter Taylor Reese was born in 2010.

In 2013, a registered nurse and viewer, Ryan Read, contacted the network after seeing a lump on Tarek's neck during a Flip or Flop marathon. The network put Read in touch with the producers, and Tarek was diagnosed with testicular cancer and thyroid cancer. The El Moussas thanked Read in a video that can be seen on HGTV.com. When doctors recommended radiation treatment, the couple decided to bank Tarek's sperm and try in-vitro fertilization to have a second child.

After a couple of failed attempts, Christina became pregnant and their son, Brayden James, was born August 20, 2015.

In May 2016, the couple separated after an incident at their Southern California home. According to a Yorba Linda police report, Christina called the police after she saw Tarek leave their home with a gun, believing he was suicidal. Tarek was found by the police, and maintained that he was never suicidal and had simply gone for a hike, taking a gun to protect himself from wild animals. In January 2017, Tarek officially filed for divorce from Christina.

=== Real estate career ===
Tarek and Christina El Moussa operated a real estate agency known as The El Moussa Group in Orange County, California, an area noted for having one of the highest foreclosure rates in the United States. Together with their partner Pete De Best, they purchased their first investment property in Santa Ana for $115,000.

After selling the property for a profit of $34,000, Tarek, Christina, and their partner Pete De Best divided the earnings and continued to invest in real estate, expanding their business into Arizona and Nevada. Following Tarek and Christina's divorce, The El Moussa Group was dissolved, and the business is now operated under the name Tarek.

In 2018, Tarek and Christina co-founded a real estate education course called Real Estate Elevated.

== Series overview ==
Season	Episodes	Originally released	
Season	Episodes	First released	Last released
1	13	April 16, 2013	May 28, 2013
2	14	April 8, 2014	July 8, 2014
3	15	October 7, 2014	July 7, 2015
4	15	December 3, 2015	March 24, 2016
5	15	June 9, 2016	September 22, 2016
6	15	December 1, 2016	March 30, 2017
7	20	June 15, 2017	September 6, 2018
8	18	August 1, 2019	December 12, 2019
9	15	October 15, 2020	February 18, 2021
10	15	December 2, 2021	March 17, 2022
From Rags to Riches	4	September 13, 2018	October 4, 2018
