= Love It or List It (franchise) =

Television franchise

- Created by: Maria Armstrong and Catherine Fogarty
- Original work: Love It or List It

Films and television
- Television series: Love It or List It; Love It or List It Vancouver; Love It or List It UK; Love It or List It Vacation Homes; Love It or List It Australia

Love It or List It is a television franchise of television programs created by Maria Armstrong and Catherine Fogarty. Each series follows a format, with a current homeowning couple or family to deciding between keeping their newly renovated current home (known on the show as "Love It") or buying a new home and selling their current one (known on the show as "List It").

== Canadian versions ==
As the franchise originated as a Canadian series, there have been a number of spinoff series produced in Canada, focusing on different regions of the country.

Title	Presenters	First aired	Last aired	Network
Love It or List It	David Visentin; Hilary Farr	2008	2023	W Network
Love It or List It Vancouver	Jillian Harris; Todd Talbot	2012	2019	W Network
Love It or List It Vacation Homes	Dan Vickery; Elisa Goldhawke	2016	2016	W Network
Vendre ou rénover au Québec (Sell or Renovate)	Daniel Corbin; Maïka Desnoyers	2017		Canal Vie
Love It or List It West	Amanda Hamilton; Robbie Kamaleddine	TBA		Home Network

== International versions ==
Country/territory	Local title	Presenters	First aired	Last aired
Australia	Love It or List It Australia	Andrew Winter; Neale Whitaker	2017	
Finland	Remppa vai muutto Suomi (Love It or List It Finland)	Anne Ramsay; Marko Paananen	August 2021	
France	Tout Changer ou Déménager (Change Everything or Move Out)	Sophie Ferjani; Stéphane Plaza; Antoine Blandin	2022	2023
New Zealand	Love It or List It NZ	Paul Glover; Alex Walls	2025	
Poland	Pokochaj albo sprzedaj (Love It or Sell It)	Marika Jóźwiak; Jacek Mędrala	2026	
United Kingdom	Love It or List It UK	Kirstie Allsopp; Phil Spencer	2015	

== See also ==
- Flip or Flop (franchise)
- Property Brothers (franchise)
