= Love It or List It Vancouver =

- Genre: Reality renovations
- Created by: Maria Armstrong; Catherine Fogarty
- Directed by: Various
- Starring: Jillian Harris; Todd Talbot
- Theme music composer: Lou Pomanti
- Country of origin: Canada
- Original language: English
- No. of seasons: 5
- No. of episodes: 129

Production
- Executive producers: Maria Armstrong, Catherine Fogarty
- Producer: Shel Piercy
- Production locations: British Columbia, Canada
- Running time: 60 minutes
- Production company: Big Coat Productions

Original release
- Network: W Network; HGTV
- Release: January 7, 2013 – December 23, 2019

Love It or List It Vancouver, known as Love It or List it Too in the United States, is a Canadian home design reality television series airing on the W Network. The show was the first spin-off from Love It or List It and was the second show in the Love it or List It franchise. The show is produced by Big Coat Productions and is based in the Greater Vancouver area and other surrounding areas in British Columbia, Canada.

The show premiered as a prime-time program on W Network in January 2013. It stars former The Bachelor and The Bachelorette star Jillian Harris, and real estate agent Todd Talbot. In the United States, the show is titled Love It or List It, Too, and airs on HGTV.

In Canada, new episodes of season three started airing on July 6, 2015, on W Network at 10pm; in the United States new episodes of Love It or List It, Too (the American title, season five) started airing on July 24, 2015.

In November 2017, the series was planning to film in the Okanagan valley.

== Storyline ==
In each episode of Love It or List It Vancouver, a couple or family is faced with the decision of whether or not their current home is the right home for them. With a list of what they would need to change in their current home, and what they would need in a new home, both hosts - a designer and a realtor - come in to try to help make the decision easier. The designer attempts to win over the homeowners by renovating their current home, and the realtor tries to find them the home of their dreams.

== Host and crew biographies ==
=== Hosts ===
- Jillian Harris – Born on December 30, 1979, in Peace River, Alberta, Canada, she is best known for her work on ABC's The Bachelor and The Bachelorette. Harris also worked as a designer on ABC's Extreme Makeover Home Edition. She now returns home to Canada, competing against her co-host and rival, Todd Talbot. Like Hilary Farr, her job is to make clients on the show regain their love for their home again.
- Todd Talbot – Born on June 12, 1973, in Vancouver, British Columbia, Canada, he is a former actor, now a realtor, and is co-host and rival of Jillian Harris. He has been married to international singer and model Rebecca Talbot since March 2007. They have a son and a daughter. Like David Visentin, his job is to get clients on the show to list their home for a better opportunity.

=== Design Team ===
Jillian has a design team who works with her on each episode. Francesca Albertazzi heads up the team with Megan Bennett, Sarah Johnson and Farah Malik.

=== Contractor ===
- Kenny Gemmill - is Jillian's general contractor, also a fire fighter and owner of Kits Construction and Development Ltd based in Vancouver. He oversees all the construction teams working on the show

== Episodes ==
Victories for Jillian are families or clients who decided to love their home and stay. Victories for Todd are families and clients who decided to list and move into a new or better home.

=== Series overview ===
Season	Start date	End date	Episodes	Jillian wins	Todd wins
1	January 7, 2013	November 25, 2013	26	15	11
2	April 9, 2014	May 27, 2015	26	16	10
3	July 6, 2015	May 2, 2016	26	15	11
4	September 7, 2016	July 17, 2017	26	15	11
5	April 1, 2019	December 23, 2019	26	13	13
6					
Total			130	74	56

=== Season 1 ===
Season no.	Series no.	Episode name	Original air date	Victory	
Season no.	Series no.	Episode name	Original air date	Jillian	Todd
1	1	Michelle & Brandon	January 7, 2013	X	
2	2	Melinda & Mike	January 14, 2013		X
3	3	Kelly & Lorn	January 21, 2013		X
4	4	Tracey & Rob	January 28, 2013	X	
5	5	Amy & Chris	February 4, 2013		X
6	6	Siva & Sinna	February 13, 2013	X	
7	7	Geneva & David	February 18, 2013	X	
8	8	Franny, Salim, Alyah & Alysha	February 25, 2013	X	
9	9	Robin & Greg	March 4, 2013		X
10	10	Brian & Teresa	March 11, 2013	X	
11	11	Carolyn & Jeff		X	
12	12	Linnea & Mike	March 25, 2013	X	
13	13	Paige & Jeff	April 1, 2013	X	
14	14	Tokiko & James	September 2, 2013	X	
15	15	Linda & Cory	September 9, 2013		X
16	16	Daniel & Rod	September 16, 2013	X	
17	17	Nicholas & Gordo	September 23, 2013		X
18	18	Tessa & Jay	September 30, 2013	X	
19	19	Theresa & David	October 7, 2013		X
20	20	Betty-Lou & Eric	October 14, 2013		X
21	21	Veronica & Brendan	October 21, 2013		X
22	22	Jane & Steve	October 28, 2013		X
23	23	Angela & Mike	November 4, 2013	X	
24	24	Michele & Gary	November 11, 2013	X	
25	25	Cynthia & Steph	November 18, 2013	X	
26	26	Karen & Mike	November 25, 2013		X
Total				15	11

=== Season 2 ===
Season no.	Series no.	Episode name	Original air date	Victory	
Season no.	Series no.	Episode name	Original air date	Jillian	Todd
1	27	Christina & Nick	April 9, 2014	X	
2	28	Holly & Chester	April 16, 2014		X
3	29	Celine & Kevin	April 23, 2014		X
4	30	Joyce & Steven	April 30, 2014	X	
5	31	Kavita & Sanjeev	May 7, 2014		X
6	32	Danielle & Trevor	May 14, 2014	X	
7	33	Amie & Marc	May 21, 2014		X
8	34	Karen & Sat	May 28, 2014	X	
9	35	Nicola & Michael	June 4, 2014	X	
10	36	Susan & Harvey	June 11, 2014	X	
11	37	Karin & Bruce	June 18, 2014	X	
12	38	Violet & Rob	June 25, 2014	X	
13	39	Shanti & Marcelo	July 2, 2014	X	
14	40	Emily & Gary	January 5, 2015		X
15	41	Neena & Jag	January 12, 2015	X	
16	42	Melissa & Josh	January 19, 2015		X
17	43	Kelly & Steve	January 26, 2015		X
18	44	Nicole & Tony	February 2, 2015	X	
19	45	Eleanor & Dave	January 23, 2015	X	
20	46	Gina & Jeff	January 30, 2015	X	
21	47	Barb & Ted	February 23, 2015		X
22	48	Una & Christian	March 2, 2015		X
23	49	Liza & Shawn	March 13, 2015		X
24	50	Michele & Brent	February 6, 2015	X	
25	51	Kim & Randy	March 16, 2015	X	
26	52	Stephanie & Stephen	March 27, 2015	X	
Total				16	10

=== Season 3 ===
Season no.	Series no.	Episode name	Original air date	Victory	
Season no.	Series no.	Episode name	Original air date	Jillian	Todd
1	53	Joanna & Derek	July 6, 2015	X	
2	54	Anastasia & Nimira	July 13, 2015		X
3	55	Julie & Bernard	July 20, 2015	X	
4	56	Lorraine & Geoff	July 24, 2015	X	
5	57	Belinda & Sam	August 3, 2015	X	
6	58	Penny & Chuck	August 7, 2015		X
7	59	Donna & Rick	August 17, 2015	X	
8	60	Lisa & Chris	August 24, 2015	X	
9	61	Cindy & Chris	August 31, 2015		X
10	62	Alice & Jim	September 7, 2015		X
11	63	Stephanie & Darrell	September 14, 2015	X	
12	64	Talia & Travis	September 21, 2015	X	
13	65	Mike & Michelle	September 28, 2015		X
14	66	Jessica & Derek	February 8, 2016	X	
15	67	Dawn & Brian	February 15, 2016		X
16	68	Lyanne & Chris	February 22, 2016		X
17	69	Karen & Ian	February 29, 2016	X	
18	70	Cathy & Peter	March 7, 2016	X	
19	71	Alia & David	March 14, 2016	X	
20	72	Candice & James	March 21, 2016		X
21	73	Lisa & Derek	March 28, 2016	X	
22	74	Debora & Paul	April 4, 2016		X
23	75	Meg & Neal	April 11, 2016	X	
24	76	Sabrina & Kevin	April 18, 2016	X	
25	77	Rachelle & Tim	April 25, 2016		X
26	78	Vivian & Don	May 2, 2016		X
Total				15	11

=== Season 4 ===
Season no.	Series no.	Episode name	Original air date	Victory	
Season no.	Series no.	Episode name	Original air date	Jillian	Todd
1	79	Stephanie & Chris	September 12, 2016	X	
2	80	Jane & David	September 19, 2016		X
3	81	Heather & Dan	September 26, 2016		X
4	82	Ellie & Davey	October 3, 2016	X	
5	83	Mary & Calvin	October 10, 2016		X
6	84	Brandy & Aaron	October 17, 2016		X
7	85	Jeanine & Norman	October 24, 2016		X
8	86	Jennifer & Robert	October 31, 2016	X	
9	87	Christine & Chris	November 7, 2016		X
10	88	Nancy & Lucky	November 14, 2016	X	
11	89	Sally & Ed	November 21, 2016	X	
12	90	Eva & Chris	November 28, 2016		X
13	91	Stephanie & Nick	December 5, 2016	X	
14	92	Kim & Terry	April 24, 2017	X	
15	93	Linda & Chris	May 1, 2017	X	
16	94	Elana & Brian	May 8, 2017		X
17	95	Aleksandra & Vincent	May 15, 2017	X	
18	96	Marcos & Brenda	May 22, 2017		X
19	97	Sherri & Jeff	May 29, 2017	X	
20	98	Katie & Mark	June 5, 2017		X
21	99	Alison & Frank	June 12, 2017	X	
22	100	Laila & Dan	June 19, 2017	X	
23	101	Shar & Dave	June 26, 2017	X	
24	102	Kelly & Gene	July 3, 2017	X	
25	103	Randi & Neil	July 10, 2017		X
26	104	Gail & Mike	July 17, 2017	X	
Total				15	11

=== Season 5 ===
Season no.	Series no.	Episode name	Original air date	Victory	
Season no.	Series no.	Episode name	Original air date	Jillian	Todd
1	105	Angie & Shawn	April 1, 2019	X	
2	106	Noelle & Kong	April 8, 2019		X
3	107	Charmaine & Cam	April 15, 2019		X
4	108	Becca & Cory	April 22, 2019	X	
5	109	Samaya & Darren	April 29, 2019		X
6	110	Kristen & Bryce	May 6, 2019	X	
7	111	Lisa & Marc	May 13, 2019	X	
8	112	Jamie & Jarrett	May 20, 2019	X	
9	113	Mel & Geoff	May 27, 2019		X
10	114	Danielle & Spencer	June 3, 2019		X
11	115	Danielle & Joel	June 10, 2019	X	
12	116	Kris & Pete	June 17, 2019	X	
13	117	Julia & Brett	June 24, 2019		X
14	118	Jennifer & Donna	July 1, 2019	X	
15	119	Linda & Dan	October 7, 2019		X
16	120	Halyna & Peter	October 14, 2019		X
17	121	Penny & Robert	October 21, 2019	X	
18	122	Brooke & Nick	October 28, 2019		X
19	123	Chad & Lisa	November 4, 2019	X	
20	124	Monique & Mike	November 11, 2019		X
21	125	Amanda & Derek	November 18, 2019		X
22	126	Shannon & Ian	November 25, 2019	X	
23	127	Theressa & Keith	December 2, 2019		X
24	128	Pratima & Parmjeet	December 9, 2019	X	
25	129	Portia & Glen	December 16, 2019		X
26	130	Karalyn & Todd	December 23, 2019	X	
Total				13	13

== See also ==
- Love It or List It
- Property Brothers
- Candice Tells All
- Fixer Upper
