= Cameron Heyward =

American football player (born 1989)

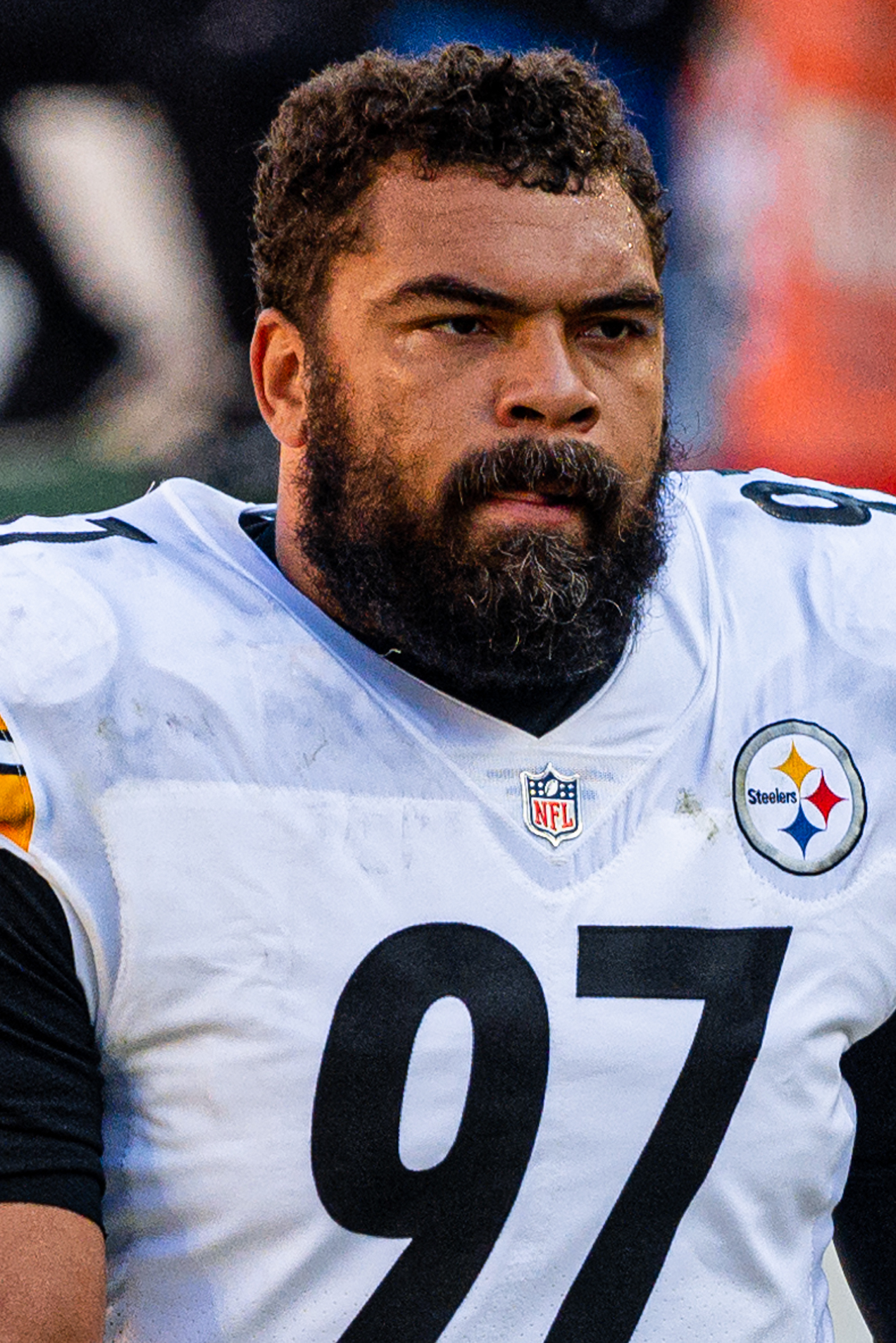
- Heyward with the Pittsburgh Steelers in 2021

No. 97 – Pittsburgh Steelers
- Position: Defensive tackle
- Roster status: Active

Personal information
- Born: May 6, 1989 (age 37); Pittsburgh, Pennsylvania, U.S.
- Listed height: 6 ft 5 in (1.96 m)
- Listed weight: 295 lb (134 kg)

Career information
- High school: Peachtree Ridge (Suwanee, Georgia)
- College: Ohio State (2007–2010)
- NFL draft: 2011: 1st round, 31st overall pick

Career history
- Pittsburgh Steelers (2011–present)

Awards and highlights
- Walter Payton NFL Man of the Year (2023); 4× First-team All-Pro (2017, 2019, 2021, 2024); 2× Second-team All-Pro (2020, 2025); 7× Pro Bowl (2017–2022, 2024); First-team All-Big Ten (2010); Second-team All-Big Ten (2009)

Career NFL statistics as of Week 10, 2026
- Total tackles: 825
- Sacks: 94.5
- Forced fumbles: 10
- Fumble recoveries: 7
- Pass deflections: 70
- Interceptions: 2
- Stats at Pro Football Reference

Cameron Phillip Heyward (born May 6, 1989) is an American professional football defensive tackle for the Pittsburgh Steelers of the National Football League (NFL). He played college football for the Ohio State Buckeyes, and was selected by the Steelers in the first round of the 2011 NFL draft. He is the son of former NFL player Craig Heyward and the older brother of NFL player Connor Heyward.

== Early life ==
Heyward attended Peachtree Ridge High School in Suwanee, Georgia, where he played for the Peachtree Ridge Lions high school football team. He was the 2006 Georgia Class 5A Defensive Player of the Year. The team tied for the Georgia Class 5A State Championship that same year. He totaled over 100 tackles and 16 sacks as a Senior. He was considered the 13th best football player in Georgia, and the 22nd best defensive tackle in the nation by 247Sports. He benched 335 pounds and squatted 510 pounds, and was considered a scholar athlete at Peachtree Ridge High School with a GPA of 3.2.

== College career ==
As a true freshman in 2007, Heyward was named a freshman All-American by Sporting News, Rivals.com and Scout.com after recording 30 tackles, 9 tackles for loss, 2 sacks, and 2 passes broken up. The Ohio State Buckeyes went to the BCS National Championship Game with Heyward as a freshman, losing to Louisiana State University, 38–24.

As a sophomore in 2008, he recorded 36 tackles and three sacks. The Buckeyes made it to another bowl game in the 2009 Fiesta Bowl against Texas, losing 24–21.

As a junior, in 2009, he had 10 tackles for loss and 6.5 sacks, leading the Ohio State Buckeyes to the Rose Bowl, in which the Buckeyes won 26–17 against Oregon. Following his junior season, Heyward decided against declaring for the NFL draft, instead returning for his senior season with the Buckeyes.

Heyward amassed 48 total tackles and 3.5 sacks in his senior season, returning an interception for a career high 80 yards against Miami. He led the Buckeyes to a berth in the Allstate 2011 Sugar Bowl, beating the Arkansas Razorbacks 31–26.

Heyward finished his career at Ohio State with 163 tackles, 37.5 tackles for loss, 15.5 sacks.

== Professional career ==
=== Pre-draft ===
Coming out of Ohio State, Heyward was projected to be selected in the first round by the majority of analysts and scouts. Sports Illustrated ranked him the 16th best prospect and the fifth best defensive end prior to the NFL Combine. Although he attended the NFL Combine, he was only able to perform the vertical after coming off elbow surgery in January. After the combine, he was projected to be selected in the first or second rounds because of the large number of defensive end prospects that were graded highly. At the conclusion of the combine, he was ranked the eighth best defensive end and the 26th best prospect by NFLDraftScout.com. NFL Network analyst Mike Mayock ranked him the seventh best defensive end and 27th best prospect in the 2011 NFL draft.

Pre-draft measurables
Height	Weight	Arm length	Hand span	Wingspan	40-yard dash	Vertical jump
6 ft 4 5/8 in (1.95 m)	294 lb (133 kg)	34 1/4 in (0.87 m)	10 1/8 in (0.26 m)	6 ft 10 1/4 in (2.09 m)	4.95 s	35.0 in (0.89 m)
All values from NFL Combine/Pro Day

=== 2011 ===
External videos
- Steelers select Heyward 31st overall
- Heyward introductory press conference

The Pittsburgh Steelers selected Heyward in the first round (31st overall) of the 2011 NFL draft. He was the seventh defensive end selected in 2011. On July 29, 2011, the Steelers signed Heyward to a four-year, $6.70 million contract that included $5.41 million guaranteed and a signing bonus of $3.37 million.

He entered training camp competing with veterans Brett Keisel, Aaron Smith, and Ziggy Hood for a starting defensive end position. Going into the regular season, he was named the backup strong side defensive end behind Brett Kiesel. After wearing jersey number 95 during the pre-season of his rookie campaign, Heyward switched to No. 97 after Jason Worilds opted to switch to No. 93.

He made his professional regular season debut in the Steelers season-opener against the Baltimore Ravens and made one solo tackle as the Ravens routed the Steelers 35–7. On October 9, 2011, Heyward recorded his first career sack on Tennessee Titans quarterback Matt Hasselbeck, while also making two solo tackles in a 38–17 victory. During a Week 16 matchup against the St. Louis Rams, he made a season-high three solo tackles in a 27–0 victory.

He finished the season with 11 combined tackles, a sack, a forced fumble, a pass deflection, and he blocked a field goal in 16 games. The Pittsburgh Steelers finished second in the AFC North with a 12–4 record and received a playoff berth.

On January 8, 2012, Heyward appeared in his first career postseason games and made four combined tackles in a 29–23 overtime loss to the Denver Broncos in the Wild Card Round.

=== 2012 ===
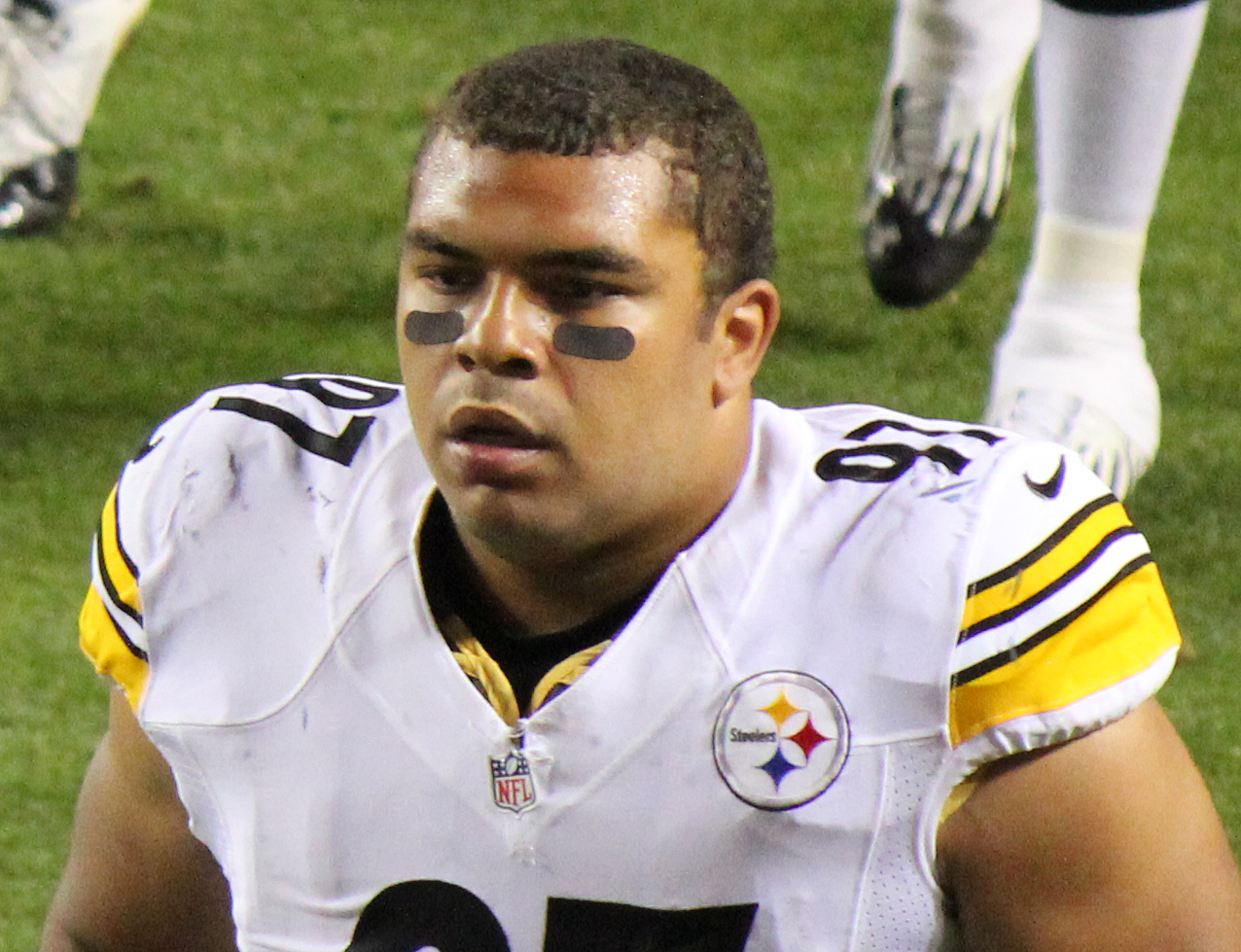
Heyward playing for the Steelers in 2012.

Heyward entered training camp competing with Ziggy Hood for the vacant weakside defensive end position. Hood won the job, making Heyward the backup for the season.

Heyward played in the Pittsburgh Steelers' season-opener against the Broncos and made three combined tackles in the 31–19 loss. The next week, Heyward recorded a solo tackle and made his first sack of the season on Mark Sanchez as the Steelers defeated the New York Jets 27–10. On December 30, 2012, he collected a season-high four combined tackles and was credited with half a sack on Thad Lewis during a 24–10 win over the Cleveland Browns. He was used as a rotational defensive end throughout the season and had 20 combined tackles and 1.5 sacks as the Steelers went 8–8 and missed the playoffs.

=== 2013 ===
Heyward began the regular season as the backup strongside defensive end behind Brett Keisel. On September 22, 2013, he earned his first career start in place of weakside defensive end Ziggy Hood and finished the 40–23 loss to the Chicago Bears with one solo tackle. He remained the starting weakside defensive end for the rest of the season. On November 3, 2013, he made five combined tackles and earned his first sack of the season on Tom Brady, as the New England Patriots routed the Steelers 55–31. In Week 14, he made a season-high ten combined tackles, a sack, and a pass deflection during a 34–28 loss to the Miami Dolphins. He finished the season with 59 combined tackles (35 solo), seven pass deflections, five sacks, two tackles for loss, and a fumble recovery in 16 games and 13 starts. He finished second on the team (first among defensive linemen) with five sacks and led the team with 31 quarterback pressures. Pro Football Focus ranked him 19th among all the qualified defensive ends in 2013.

=== 2014 ===
On April 22, 2014, the Pittsburgh Steelers exercised a fifth-year option on his rookie contract paying him $6.96M in 2015.

Throughout training camp he competed with Brett Keisel, Stephon Tuitt, and Cam Thomas to be a starting defensive end. Defensive coordinator Dick Lebeau named him the starting weak side defensive end, opposite Cam Thomas, to begin the regular season.

He started the Steelers season-opener against the Browns and made four combined tackles and sacked Brian Hoyer in a 30–27 victory. The following game, he recorded a season-high seven combined tackles as the Ravens defeated the Steelers 26–6. On October 3, 2014, Heyward was fined $22,050 by the NFL for using abusive language towards an official during Week 4 loss to the Tampa Bay Buccaneers. On December 21, 2014, Heyward recorded four combined tackles and was credited 1.5 sacks on Alex Smith during a 20–12 victory over the Kansas City Chiefs. The following game, he made a season-high six solo tackles, an assisted tackle, and sacked Andy Dalton in a 27–17 win. He finished the season with 53 combined tackles (33 solo), a career-high 7.5 sacks, and four pass deflections in 16 games and 16 starts. He received the sixth highest overall grade among all qualified defensive ends from Pro Football Focus in 2014.

The Steelers finished first in the AFC North with an 11–5 record in 2014. On January 3, 2015, Heyward made two combined tackles in a 30–17 loss to the Ravens in the AFC Wild Card Round.

=== 2015 ===
On July 16, 2015, the Pittsburgh Steelers signed Heyward to a six-year, $59.25 million extension that includes $15 million guaranteed and a signing bonus of $12 million.

Heyward began the season as the de facto left defensive end, along with Stephon Tuitt. In Week 2, he made five solo tackles and sacked Colin Kaepernick as the Steelers routed the San Francisco 49ers 43–18. On November 8, 2015, Heyward racked up a season-high eight combined tackles in a 38–35 victory over the Oakland Raiders.

Heyward finished the season with 54 combined tackles (39 solo), seven sacks, and two pass deflections in 16 games and 16 starts. The Pittsburgh Steelers finished second in the AFC North with a 10–6 record. On January 9, 2016, he made a solo tackle and sacked A. J. McCarron during an 18–16 victory over the Cincinnati Bengals in the Wild Card Round. The following game, the Pittsburgh Steelers lost 23–16 to the eventual Super Bowl 50 Champions, the Broncos, in the Divisional Round. Heyward was ranked 88th on the NFL Top 100 Players of 2016.

=== 2016 ===
Heyward started at defensive end in the Pittsburgh Steelers' season-opener against the Washington Redskins and collected two combined tackles in a 38–16 victory. On October 2, 2016, Heyward recorded a season-high seven solo tackles, two pass deflections, and sacked Alex Smith a career-high three times, as the Pittsburgh Steelers routed the Chiefs 43–14. During Week 6, he missed the first game of his career with a hamstring injury. His streak ended at 85 consecutive games and 49 consecutive starts. On November 13, 2016, Heyward suffered a torn pectoral muscle during the Steelers loss to the Dallas Cowboys where he recorded two solo tackles. He announced two days later that he would be placed on injured reserve and would miss the rest of the season. He finished the season with 22 combined tackles (17 solo), three sacks, and four pass deflections.

=== 2017 ===
In Week 4, Heyward recorded two sacks and a fumble recovery in a 26–9 win over the Baltimore Ravens, earning him AFC Defensive Player of the Week. On November 27, 2017, Heyward recorded a season-high six combined tackles and had two sacks on quarterback Brett Hundley in the Steelers' 31–28 victory against the Green Bay Packers in Week 12. His performance earned him his second AFC Defensive Player of the Week honors of the season. After the season, he was named to the First-team All-Pro team. Head coach Mike Tomlin elected to rest Heyward during a Week 17 win against the Browns as the Steelers had already clinched a playoff berth and first round bye. Heyward finished the season with 45 combined tackles (30 solo), a career-high 12 sacks, and three pass deflections in 15 games and 15 starts. Pro Football Focus gave him an overall grade of 88.9, which ranked him tenth among all qualified interior defensive linemen in 2017. He was also ranked 48th by his peers on the NFL Top 100 Players of 2018.

=== 2018 ===
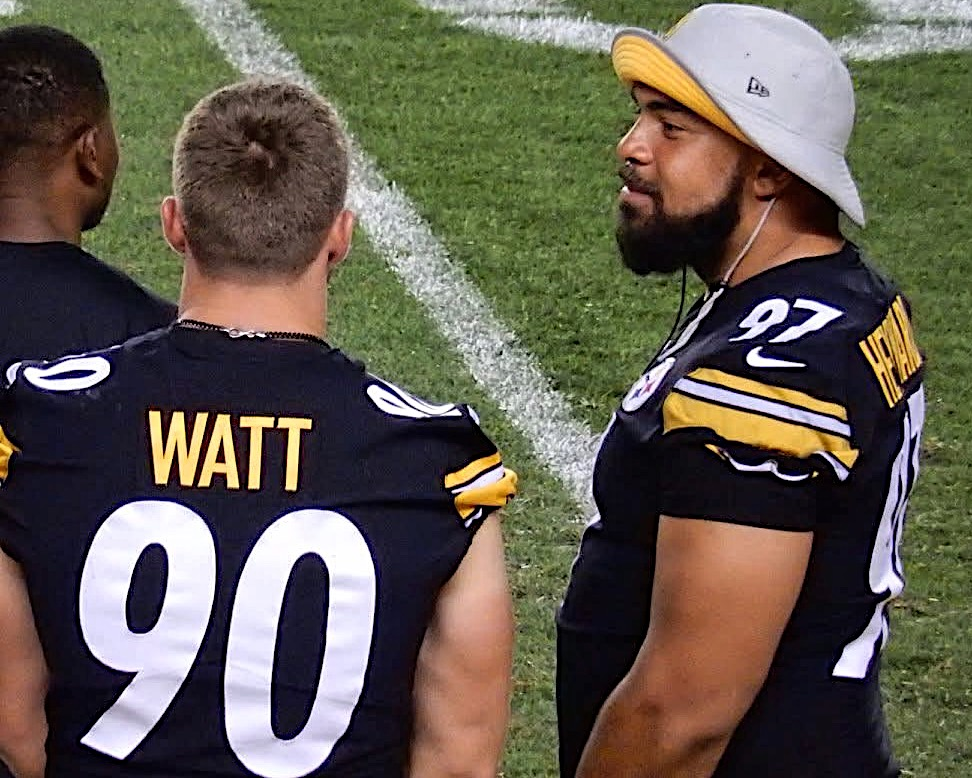
Heyward with T. J. Watt in 2018

In Week 5 against the Atlanta Falcons, Heyward recorded 1.5 sacks and 1 tackle for loss in a 41–17 blowout win. In Week 10 against the Carolina Panthers, Heyward recorded 2 sacks as the Steelers won 52–21. Heyward finished the season with 51 tackles, 8 sacks, 3 passes defended, 1 forced fumble, and 1 fumble recovery. He was ranked 88th by his fellow players on the NFL Top 100 Players of 2019.

=== 2019 ===
In Week 4 against the Bengals, Heyward recorded 2.5 sacks and a forced fumble on Andy Dalton in the 27–3 win. He finished the 2019 season with nine sacks, 83 tackles, six passes defended, one forced fumble, and one fumble recovery. He was named to his third consecutive Pro Bowl. He was named First-team All-Pro for the second time in his career. He was ranked 84th by his fellow players on the NFL Top 100 Players of 2020.

=== 2020 ===
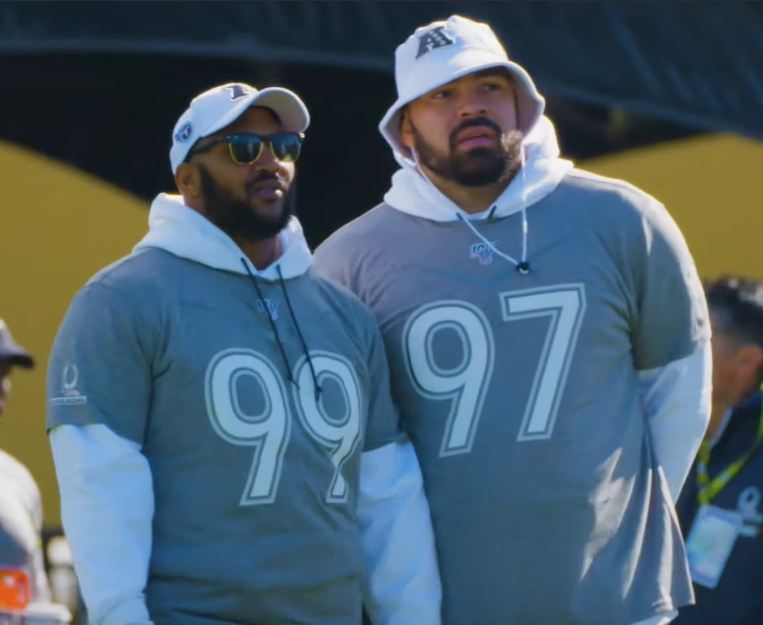
Heyward alongside Jurrell Casey at the 2020 Pro Bowl

On September 6, 2020, Heyward signed a four-year, $65.6 million contract extension with the Steelers.

In Week 1 against the New York Giants on Monday Night Football, Heyward recorded his first career interception off a pass thrown by Daniel Jones during the 26–16 win. In Week 5 against the Philadelphia Eagles, Heyward recorded his first full sack of the season on Carson Wentz during the 38–29 win. Heyward finished the 2020 season recording 54 total tackles (30 solo, 24 assisted) four sacks, five stuffs, one interception and three passes defended.

The team finished first in the AFC North and hosted the Cleveland Browns at home in the AFC Wildcard game. Heyward was able to only record one solo tackle and one pass defended as the team ended their season with a 48–37 loss.

He was ranked 57th by his fellow players on the NFL Top 100 Players of 2021.

=== 2021 ===
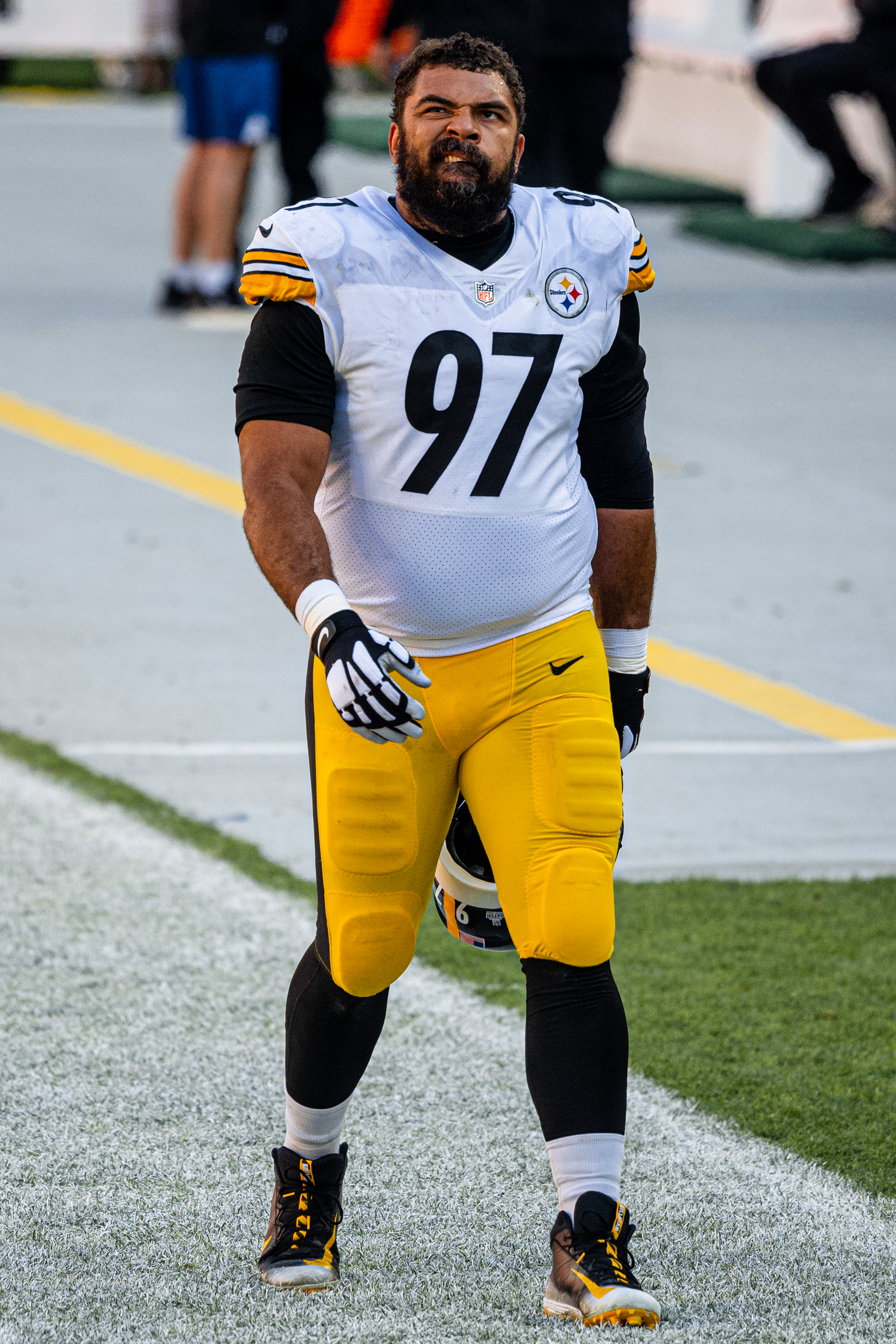
Heyward during a game against the Cleveland Browns in 2021

In Week 1, Heyward recorded his first sack of the season on Josh Allen during the Steelers' 23–16 win over the Buffalo Bills. He also recorded four tackles (two assisted, two solo), one forced fumble, a fumble return for a touchdown and defended two passes. He achieved his first multiple sack game when the Steelers tied with the Detroit Lions 16–16 on November 14, sacking Jared Goff twice. Across the final three games of the season, Heyward made one sack in each on Patrick Mahomes, Baker Mayfield, and Lamar Jackson respectively. In the regular season, Heyward recorded ten sacks, 89 total tackles (53 solo), one interception, nine passes defended, and one forced fumble. He was named to the Pro Bowl and earned first team All-Pro honors.

Heyward and the Steelers achieved another post-season appearance facing off against the Kansas City Chiefs in the AFC Wildcard round. During the game, Heyward recorded four tackles and a forced fumble that T. J. Watt returned for a touchdown as the Steelers ended their season losing 21–42.

After the season, he was ranked 42nd by his fellow players on the NFL Top 100 Players of 2022.

=== 2022 ===
In Week 16, Heyward had seven tackles, two sacks, and three tackles for loss in a 13–10 win over the Raiders, earning AFC Defensive Player of the Week. He finished the 2022 season with 10.5 sacks, 74 tackles, four passes defended, one forced fumble, and one fumble recovery. He was ranked 45th by his fellow players on the NFL Top 100 Players of 2023.

=== 2023 ===
On September 14, 2023, Heyward was placed on injured reserve after suffering a groin injury in Week 1. He was activated on November 1. He finished the 2023 season with two sacks, 33 tackles, and one pass defended. At the 13th Annual NFL Honors in Las Vegas on February 8, 2024, Heyward was named the recipient of the 2023 Walter Payton NFL Man of the Year Award. Heyward was ranked 98th by his fellow players on the NFL Top 100 Players of 2024.

=== 2024 ===
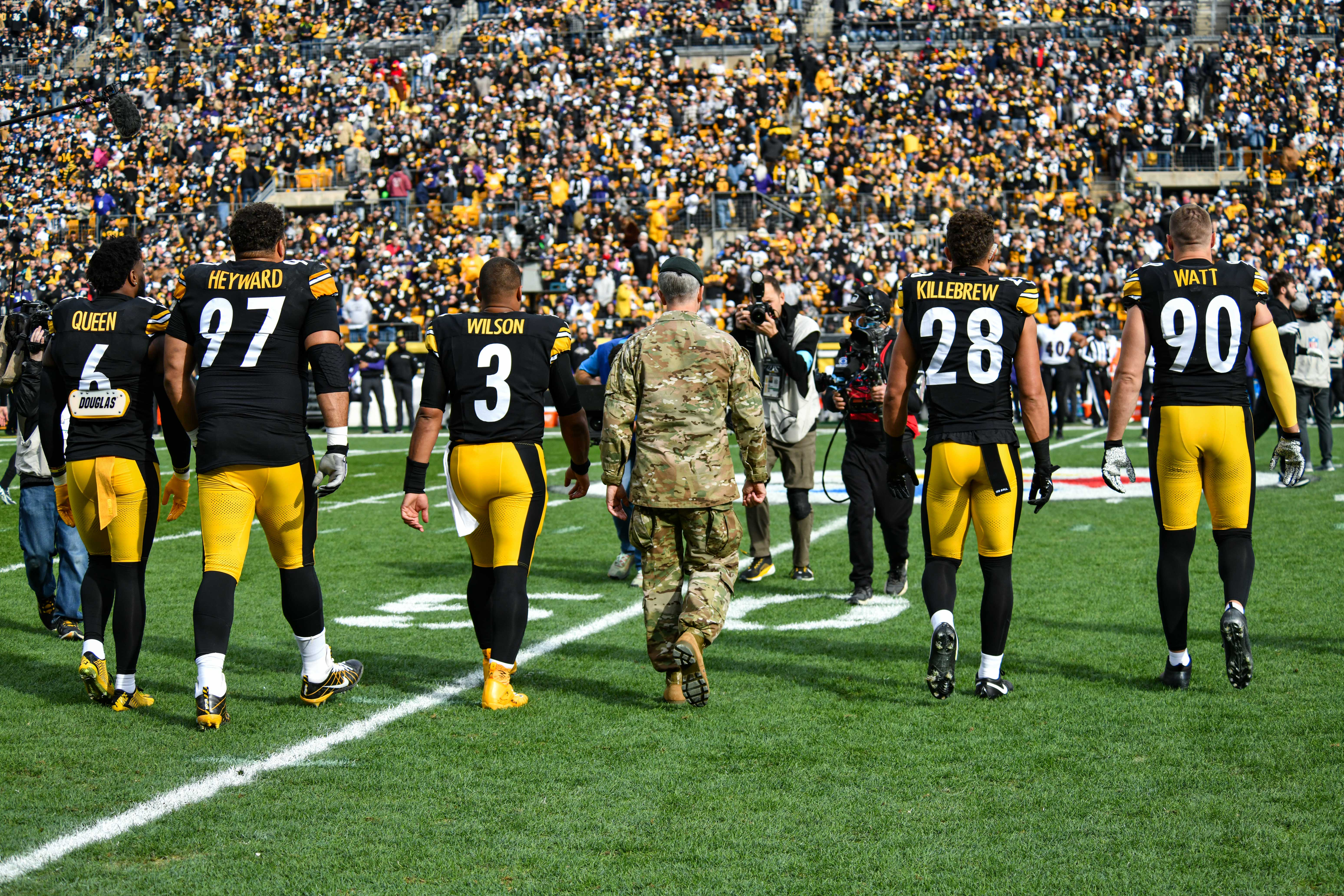
Heyward (97) taking the field before a game in 2024

On September 3, 2024, Heyward signed a three-year, $45 million contract extension with the Steelers. For a tenth consecutive year, Heyward was named a team captain in 2024.

Heyward began his season making four tackles (two assisted, two solo) in Week 1's 18–10 win over the Atlanta Falcons. He made his first sack of the season on Chargers quarterback Justin Herbert as the Steelers won 20–10. On November 10, Heyward achieved his first game of the season recording multiple sacks. He was able to sack Commanders quarterback Jayden Daniels twice to help the Steelers win 28–27. He repeated this performance during November 21's 24–19 loss to the Cleveland Browns. In the 2024 season, he had eight sacks, 71 tackles, and 11 passes defended. He finished the season being named to a seventh Pro Bowl appearance. He earned first team All-Pro honors for the fourth time. He was ranked 83rd by his fellow players on the NFL Top 100 Players of 2025.

=== 2025 ===
While Heyward reported to training camp, he held out of on-field practices as he requested his current contract to be renegotiated for more money. He finished the 2025 season with 3.5 sacks, 78 tackles, and six passes defended.

=== 2026 ===
Heyward (97) with the Steelers in 2026

On March 10, 2026, Heyward and the Steelers agreed to a new two-year, $32.25 million contract, adding one year to his previous deal.

== Career statistics ==
Legend
**Bold**	Career high

=== NFL ===
==== Regular season ====
Year	Team	Games		Tackles					Fumbles			Interceptions					
Year	Team	GP	GS	Cmb	Solo	Ast	Sck	TFL	FF	FR	Yds	Int	Yds	Avg	Lng	TD	PD
2011	PIT	16	0	11	10	1	1.0	1	1	0	0	0	0	0.0	0	0	1
2012	PIT	16	0	20	13	7	1.5	4	0	0	0	0	0	0.0	0	0	0
2013	PIT	16	13	59	35	24	5.0	7	0	**1**	**8**	0	0	0.0	0	0	7
2014	PIT	16	16	53	33	20	7.5	11	0	0	0	0	0	0.0	0	0	4
2015	PIT	16	16	54	39	15	7.0	15	1	0	0	0	0	0.0	0	0	2
2016	PIT	7	7	21	17	4	3.0	4	0	**1**	1	0	0	0.0	0	0	4
2017	PIT	15	15	45	30	15	**12.0**	**16**	**2**	**1**	0	0	0	0.0	0	0	3
2018	PIT	16	16	51	29	22	8.0	10	1	**1**	0	0	0	0.0	0	0	3
2019	PIT	16	16	83	51	32	9.0	11	1	**1**	0	0	0	0.0	0	0	6
2020	PIT	15	15	54	30	24	4.0	7	0	0	0	**1**	0	0.0	0	0	3
2021	PIT	17	17	**89**	**53**	36	10.0	15	1	**1**	0	**1**	0	0.0	0	0	9
2022	PIT	17	17	74	39	35	10.5	14	1	**1**	0	0	0	0.0	0	0	4
2023	PIT	11	11	33	25	8	2.0	6	0	0	0	0	0	0.0	0	0	1
2024	PIT	17	17	71	35	36	8.0	12	0	0	0	0	0	0.0	0	0	**11**
2025	PIT	17	17	78	38	**40**	3.5	9	1	0	0	0	0	0.0	0	0	6
2026	PIT	9	9	29	12	17	2.5	3	1	0	0	0	0	0.0	0	0	6
Career		237	202	825	489	336	94.5	145	10	7	9	2	0	0.0	0	0	70

==== Postseason ====
Year	Team	Games		Tackles					Fumbles			Interceptions					
Year	Team	GP	GS	Cmb	Solo	Ast	Sck	TFL	FF	FR	Yds	Int	Yds	Avg	Lng	TD	PD
2011	PIT	1	0	4	3	1	0.0	0	0	0	0	0	0	0.0	0	0	0
2014	PIT	1	1	2	2	0	0.0	0	0	0	0	0	0	0.0	0	0	0
2015	PIT	2	2	1	1	0	**1.0**	0	**1**	0	0	0	0	0.0	0	0	0
2016	PIT	0	0	Did not play due to injury													
2017	PIT	1	1	1	1	0	0.0	1	0	0	0	0	0	0.0	0	0	0
2020	PIT	1	1	1	1	0	0.0	0	0	0	0	0	0	0.0	0	0	**1**
2021	PIT	1	1	4	2	2	0.0	0	**1**	0	0	0	0	0.0	0	0	0
2023	PIT	1	1	6	**4**	2	0.0	1	0	0	0	0	0	0.0	0	0	0
2024	PIT	1	1	**10**	3	**7**	0.0	**2**	0	0	0	0	0	0.0	0	0	0
2025	PIT	1	1	3	0	3	0.0	0	0	0	0	0	0	0.0	0	0	0
Career		10	9	32	17	15	1.0	4	2	0	0	0	0	0.0	0	0	1

=== College ===
Year	Team	GP	Tackles					Interceptions					Fumbles			
Year	Team	GP	Cmb	Solo	Ast	Sck	TFL	Int	Yds	Avg	TD	PD	FF	FR	Yds	TD
2007	Ohio State	13	33	21	12	2.5	10.0	0	0	—	0	**3**	**1**	0	0	0
2008	Ohio State	13	36	13	23	3.0	4.5	0	0	—	0	1	**1**	0	0	0
2009	Ohio State	13	46	21	**25**	**6.5**	10.0	0	0	—	0	0	0	0	0	**1**
2010	Ohio State	13	**48**	**25**	23	3.5	**13.0**	**1**	**80**	**80.0**	0	0	0	0	0	0
Career		52	163	80	83	15.5	37.5	1	80	80.0	0	4	2	0	0	1

== Personal life ==
Heyward was born in Pittsburgh, Pennsylvania. His father Craig "Ironhead" Heyward was a former NFL fullback. His father died from cancer, and Cameron was fined by the NFL for uniform violations when he displayed his father's nickname in an eye black message during the NFL's 2015 Breast Cancer Awareness campaign. Cameron stated that being part of the NFL was a blessing and he wanted to honor his dad and raise cancer awareness.

During Heyward's freshman year at Ohio State University, he began dating Allie Schwarzwalder and proposed to her on New Year's Eve 2012 at Savoy. On May 11, 2013, they were married at the Westin Convention Center Pittsburgh Hotel in Pittsburgh, Pennsylvania. They have three children, born in 2015, 2017, and 2019.

Heyward has three brothers. His younger brother, Corey Heyward, played college basketball for Georgia Tech. His youngest brother Connor played as a tight end for Michigan State. On April 30, 2022, the Steelers drafted Connor as a tight end in the sixth round of the 2022 NFL draft.
