= Love It or List It =

Canadian-American television series

- Genre: Reality renovations, upgrading
- Created by: Maria Armstrong; Catherine Fogarty
- Directed by: Various
- Starring: David Visentin; Page Turner
- Narrated by: Jacqueline Hennessy
- Theme music composer: Lou Pomanti
- Countries of origin: Canada; United States
- Original language: English
- No. of seasons: 20
- No. of episodes: 245 (List of episodes)

Production
- Executive producers: Maria Armstrong; Catherine Fogarty
- Producer: Maria Armstrong
- Production locations: Toronto, Ontario, Canada; Raleigh, North Carolina; Durham, North Carolina
- Running time: 44 minutes
- Production company: Big Coat Productions

Original release
- Network: W Network; HGTV
- Release: September 8, 2008 – present

Love It or List It is a home design TV show starring David Visentin and Page Turner. It originally broadcast from 2008 to 2023 with David Visentin and Hilary Farr starring, on HGTV, W Network, and OWN Canada. It is the original show in the Love It or List It franchise.

The show premiered on September 8, 2008. Its 20th season began in April 2025 with Page Turner replacing Hilary Farr, and following the same format.

== Format ==
Every episode of Love It or List It follows the same format. A couple or family shows their current house to designer Hilary Farr and real estate agent David Visentin. Hilary redesigns parts of the home based on the desires of the homeowners and their budget and she oversees the renovations and construction. David finds real estate listings that meet the homeowners' needs and budget to convince them to list their current house and buy a new one.

Common challenges that Hilary faces include an inadequate budget to complete the entire request list from the homeowners, often due to discovery of unforeseen issues with the house that are uncovered during the renovation, such as lack of compliance with modern building codes.

Common issues for David, meanwhile, depend on the homeowners' desires; for instance, the couple has children enrolled in the neighborhood school and they do not desire to change, or the potential house is too distant from family members or a workplace. Frequently, David will offer a house significantly outside his given budget, and the homeowners will consider it, or homeowners will outright increase his target; Hilary meets with much more resistance to requests for even small increases in the renovation budget.

After Hilary's renovation is complete, the homeowners are given a tour of their current home to see what she was able to accomplish.

After the tour, David meets with them and hands them an evaluation of the home's current market value following the renovations. He will then remind the couple what they could have in one of the new homes they looked at and that they would not get that in their current home.

The homeowners then meet with Hilary and David, who pose a question to them: The homeowners must choose either to "Love It," meaning that they will continue to live in their current home with the renovations, or to "List It," meaning that they will buy one of the homes David showed them and sell their current home.

At this stage, all else being equal Hilary is at a theoretical disadvantage: Although Hilary's renovations increase the attractiveness of her "Love It" option by improving the current home's livability, they simultaneously increase the attractiveness of David's "List It" option by increasing the current home's resale value and thereby decreasing the net cost of acquiring any given new home that he proposes.

By contrast, David's efforts to maximize the attractiveness of his "List It" option do not provide Hilary any offsetting benefit increasing the attractiveness of her "Love It" option.

After a moment to deliberate, the homeowners reveal their decision and explain their reasoning to Hilary and David. If the homeowners decide to "List It," Hilary generally reacts with equanimity and expresses a desire for their best interest, whereas if they decide to "Love It," David frequently reacts with feigned incredulity, questioning their reasoning and/or giving at least the impression of taking their decision personally.

The parties then bid each other farewell, with closing footage of Hilary and David continuing to react and occasionally continuing their bout of one-upmanship.

== Host and crew ==
Hosts

- David Visentin – David Visentin is a real estate agent in Southern Ontario with Country Living Realty Limited. He has been practicing since 1987.
- Page Turner

Assistant Designer

- Desta Ostapyk (Canadian episodes) – Desta is a Toronto-based designer who graduated in 2004 from the Toronto International Academy of Design and Technology in Interior Design, and has since focused on a career in the television Industry. She first started working with Big Coat Productions during her last semester of school as an intern for HGTV's hit series My Parents House. She soon became the design stylist for the show.

Contractors

- Eric Eremita (North Carolina episodes) – General contractor and designer Eric Eremita was selected to be the one and only general contractor on HGTV's Love It or List It U.S. version, after the network took notice of him when he competed in its Brother vs. Brother reality show.
- Eddie Richardson (Canadian episodes) – Eddie Richardson was a contractor on Love It or List It who started his own family business. Richardson has also been a pro-beach volleyball player and professional bass fisherman.
- Fergus McLaren (Canadian episodes) – Fergus McLaren started up his own construction company, R-Mac Solutions, 10 years ago.

Behind the Scenes

- Architect: Simon West
- Senior Production Coordinator: Linda Johnstone
- Construction Coordinator: David Violante
- Construction Lead : Adam Dalgarno
- Construction Assistants: Chris Blinn, Ahren Mrowietz, Dale George
- Design Coordinator: Kaaveh Shoman

Former Host

- Hilary Farr – Hilary Farr is a home designer from Toronto, Ontario. She has lived in Australia, England, California, and New York City. Farr honed her skills on properties in Los Angeles, Santa Barbara, New York and Toronto. When she first moved back to Toronto, she became the first designer to "stage" properties for sale. She continues to build and design homes in the downtown core where she herself owns properties. In 2023, she decided to leave the show.

== Spinoffs ==
Love It or List It has spawned five spinoffs.

The first, known as Love It or List It Vancouver (or Love it or List it Too in the US), was launched in winter 2012 and is hosted by Jillian Harris and Todd Talbot.

The second spin-off, a British version known as Kirstie and Phil's Love It or List It, debuted in 2015, is hosted by Kirstie Allsopp and Phil Spencer.

The third spin off, Love It or List It Vacation Homes debuted in spring 2016 and is hosted by Dan Vickery and Elisa Goldhawke.

A fourth spin off, Vendre ou rénover au Québec, debuted in January 2017 and is hosted by Maika Desnoyers and Daniel Corbin.

The fifth spin off, Love It Or List It Australia, debuted in September 2017 and is hosted by Andrew Winter and Neale Whittaker.

In 2026 Corus Entertainment announced the forthcoming launch of Love It or List It West, to be shot in Calgary, Alberta, and hosted by designer Amanda Hamilton and real estate agent Robbie Kamaleddine.

== International syndication ==
| Country / Region | Name | Television Network | Dubbing / Subtitles |
|---|---|---|---|
| Australia | Love It or List It | Lifestyle Home | —N/a |
| Brazil | Ame-a ou Deixe-a | Discovery Home & Health | Portuguese |
| Bulgaria | Podnovi ili proday | Fox Life (Bulgaria) | Bulgarian |
| Belgium | Ons Huis/Nieuw Huis | VRT1 | Dutch |
| Canada | Love It or List It | W Network | —N/a |
| Croatia | Obožavaj ili Prodaj | FoxTV | Croatian |
| Finland | Remppa vai muutto | Nelonen | Finnish |
| France | Déco ou Négo | 6ter | French |
| Italy | Prendere o lasciare | Cielo | dubbed in Italian |
| Latin America | Vívala o véndala | Discovery Home & Health | Spanish |
| Norway | Bolighjelpen | TV 2 (Norway) | Norwegian |
| Poland | Pokochaj lub sprzedaj | WP | lector |
| Portugal | Love it or List it Vancouver | SIC Mulher | Portuguese |
| Spain | Tu casa a juicio | Divinity | Spanish Castilian |
| Turkey | Ya Sev Ya Sat | TLC | Turkish Dubbing |
| United Kingdom | Love It or List It | Channel 4 | —N/a |
| United States | Love It or List It | HGTV | —N/a |

== Reception ==
On August 31, 2010, Love It or List It was nominated for two Gemini Awards: Best Reality Program or Series and Best Direction in a Reality Program or Series. When HGTV premiered the show on the network, the company stated that Love It or List It has been the highest-rated reality series since Candice Olson's Candice Tells All.

In 2012, New York Times' columnist Gail Collins noted that it was US Secretary of State Hillary Clinton's favorite TV show. According to Collins, Clinton finds the show "very calming" after being interviewed about her departure from politics.

In a 2013 interview with Las Vegas Magazine, Vanna White from Wheel of Fortune said it was one of her favorite HGTV programs. Actress Julianne Moore also gave similar praise for the show in an interview with Katie Couric.

According to The Wall Street Journal, the show and its Vancouver spinoff is one of Canada's beloved reality series.

The show has also been referenced in various television sitcoms and films including ABC's The Middle, CBS's Mom and Rebel Wilson's 2019 film Isn't It Romantic.

In 2023, the show was ranked as the #4 best real estate show by Agent Wealth Hustle, a popular real estate blog.

== Controversy ==
In April 2016, homeowners Deanna Murphy and Tim Sullivan who had participated in a 2015 Love It or List It episode filed suit against production company Big Coat TV, as well as the North Carolina contractor (Aaron Fitz Construction) who had been hired by the show to do the renovations on their home. The couple alleges that the renovation funds that they provided were not properly disbursed, and that the work on their home was done to a substandard quality. Moreover, the lawsuit states that the television personalities on the show do not play an active role in the renovation process, and that they were not shown homes on the market by any licensed North Carolina real estate agent. Big Coat TV has commented that they "do intend to vigorously defend what [they] consider to be false allegations."

The suit was settled in April 2017. The plaintiffs had signed a confidentiality agreement; their lawyer would not comment on the settlement. Big Coat had previously filed a countersuit for libel, slander and product disparagement; parts of that suit had been dismissed by the time of the settlement but that was under appeal by Big Coat. After the agreements had been concluded, both suits were dismissed.
