= 3:16 game =

2012 NFL playoff game

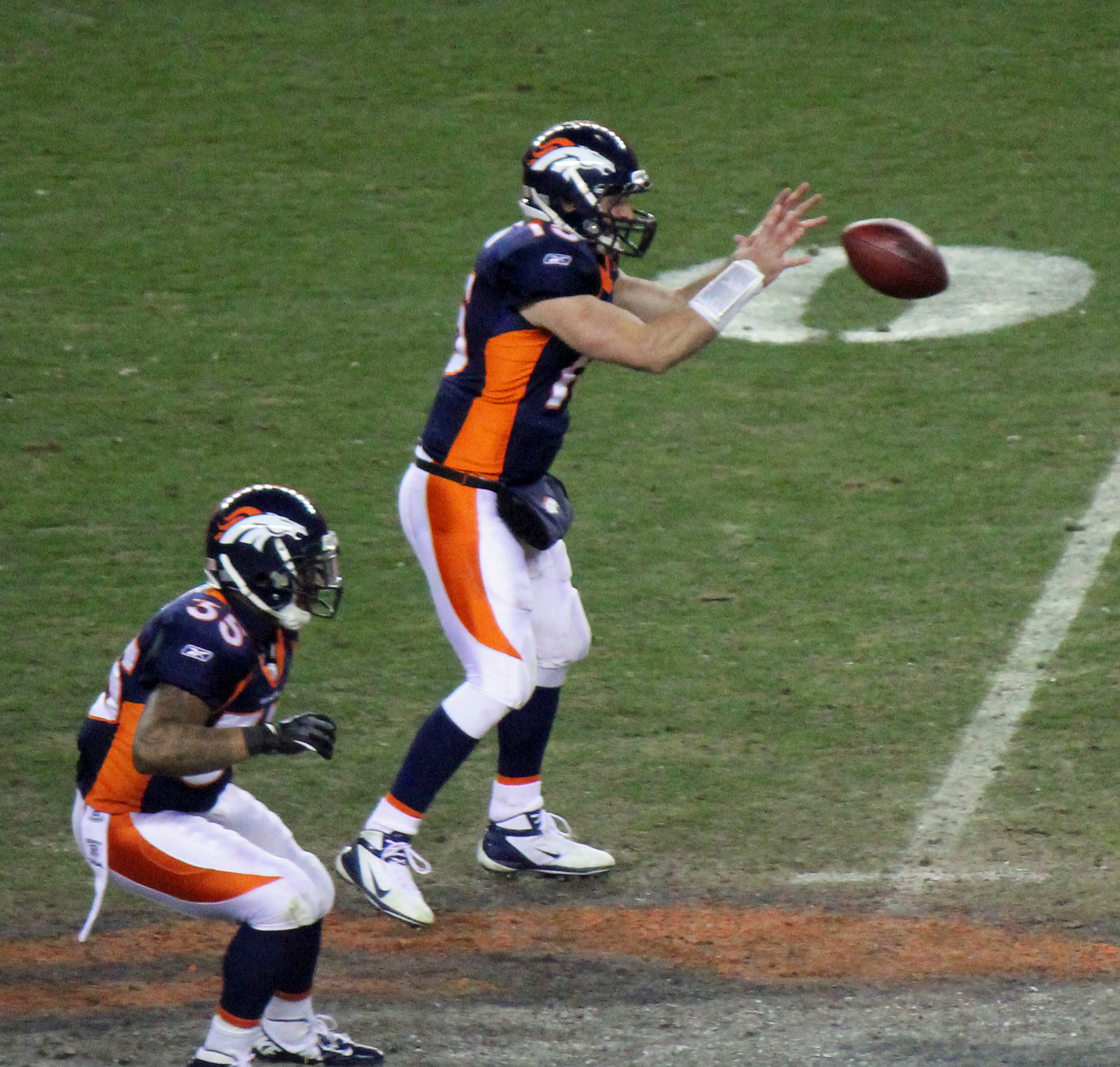
- Quarterback Tim Tebow taking a snap during the game with Lance Ball also in the backfield
| Pittsburgh Steelers (5) (12–4) | Denver Broncos (4) (8–8) |
|---|---|
| 23 | 29 |
| Head coach: Mike Tomlin | Head coach: John Fox |
| | 1 | 2 | 3 | 4 | OT | Total |
|---|---|---|---|---|---|---|
| PIT | 6 | 0 | 7 | 10 | 0 | 23 |
| DEN | 0 | 20 | 0 | 3 | 6 | 29 |
- Date: January 8, 2012
- Kickoff time: 3:00 P.M.
- Stadium: Sports Authority Field at Mile High; Denver, Colorado
- Favorite: Steelers by 8
- Referee: Ron Winter
- Attendance: 75,970

TV in the United States
- Network: CBS
- Announcers: Jim Nantz and Phil Simms
- Nielsen ratings: 41.9 million viewers, 14.8 rating among adults 18-49

The 3:16 game was a National Football League playoff game between the Denver Broncos and the Pittsburgh Steelers on January 8, 2012. The game took place in the 2011–12 NFL playoffs and finished with five statistics that each contained three digits in the order 3–1–6. It was the first playoff game to go to overtime since a 2010 overtime rule was codified stating both teams could possess the ball unless one scored a touchdown. The game also set a record for the shortest overtime in NFL history at the time; the Broncos scored a touchdown 11 seconds into overtime on their first play.

When Tim Tebow played college football for the Florida Gators during the 2008 Florida Gators season, he began writing messages on his eye black (a practice the NCAA would ban in April 2010). At the conclusion of the season, Tebow played in the 2009 BCS National Championship Game and inscribed the biblical citation "John 3:16" on his eye black. Exactly three years to the day after that championship game, Tebow played in this playoff game as a quarterback for the Broncos on January 8, 2012.

During the game, Tebow accumulated 316 passing yards with an average of 31.6 yards per completion. The Steelers finished the game with a time of possession of 31 minutes and 6 seconds. The game's ratings peaked between 8:00 and 8:15 p.m. Eastern Time with a rating of 31.6. Steelers quarterback Ben Roethlisberger threw a second-quarter interception on 3rd-and-16.

== Background ==
The use of eye black involves painting black stripes under the eyes. The black is used to absorb light and make it easier for the wearer to see better. Eye black is commonly used in sports such as football, baseball and lacrosse. One of the first athletes to wear eye black was Babe Ruth in the 1930s.

Between 2003 and 2005, college football running back Reggie Bush started the trend of writing messages in his eye black. (Note: In college football some players used strips of black tape under their eyes. Reggie Bush, Tim Tebow and other players occasionally used a white marker to write messages on the black strips. The NCAA banned the practice in 2010 as a result of Tebow's practice of writing spiritual messages in his eye black.) He scrawled the area code of San Diego (619) into his eye black. College football quarterback Tim Tebow began scrawling messages in his eye black. Tebow scrawled the citations for various Bible verses into his eye black. Some of the verses he promoted were Mark 8:36, John 16:33, Ephesians 2:8–10, James 1:2–4 and John 3:16. Tebow considers himself to be a devout Christian and was the quarterback for the Denver Broncos. John 3:16 was meaningful to him because of the message in the verse: "For God so loved the world, that He gave His only begotten Son, that whoever believes in Him shall not perish, but have eternal life."

On January 8, 2009, Tebow was the quarterback of the Florida Gators in the 2009 BCS National Championship Game: during the game, he wore eye black that was inscribed with "John 3:16". The reference to John 3:16 was said to have caused 94 million people to look up its meaning on the Google search engine.

== Statistical divinity ==
Tebow had game statistics that were similar to the referenced Bible verse John 3:16. (Note: An additional coincidence involved the margin of victory of the Broncos' prior three games (during the regular season). The losses were by 18, 4 and 26 points which totaled 48 points: 3 losses with an average margin of victory of 16 points each.) (Note: Similarly, Pittsburgh's prior three games (during the regular season) had margins of victory of 17 (loss), 27 (win) and 4 (win), which also totaled 48 for a 3-game average of 16.) The playoff game was played exactly three years after Tebow wore the eye black inscribed with the Bible verse John 3:16. The game finished with what was considered an upset victory: the final score of the game was Denver Broncos 29 and the Pittsburgh Steelers 23. Tebow is known for his affinity for the Bible and his faith in Jesus Christ.

- Tebow accumulated 316 passing yards.
- Tebow's passing yards averaged 31.6 yards per completion.
- The Pittsburgh Steelers time of possession in the game was 31 minutes and 6 seconds.
- CBS televised the game, with ratings peaking at 31.6 between 8:00 and 8:15 p.m. Eastern Time.
- The only interception in the game was thrown by quarterback Ben Roethlisberger of the Pittsburgh Steelers; he threw a second-quarter interception on 3rd-and-16.
- This game was played 316 weeks after Tim Tebow declared his intention to play college football for the University of Florida.

== Game summary ==
The line for the game called the Broncos an 8-point underdog. In the first quarter, Shaun Suisham kicked field goals of 45 and 38 yards. The score at the conclusion of the first quarter was Steelers 6, Broncos 0. In the second quarter the Broncos scored 20 points: on an Eddie Royal 30-yard pass, a Tim Tebow 8-yard run, two Matt Prater extra points and two field goals (20 and 28 yards). In the third quarter the Steelers scored seven points on a Mike Wallace one-yard run and a Shaun Suisham extra point. In the fourth quarter the Broncos scored once on a Matt Prater 35-yard field goal. The Steelers scored three times: a Shaun Suisham 37-yard Field goal, a Jerricho Cotchery 31-yard touchdown pass and a Shaun Suisham extra point. At the conclusion of regulation time the score was 23 to 23. In overtime, on the first play after the kickoff, Demaryius Thomas scored on an 80-yard touchdown pass. The final score was Broncos 29, Steelers 23.

=== Box score ===
2012 AFC Wild Card Game: Pittsburgh Steelers at Denver Broncos

| Quarter | 1 | 2 | 3 | 4 | OT | Total |
|---|---|---|---|---|---|---|
| Broncos | 0 | 20 | 0 | 3 | 6 | 29 |
| Steelers | 6 | 0 | 7 | 10 | 0 | 23 |

at Sports Authority Field at Mile High, Denver

- Date: January 8, 2012
- Game time: 3:27 p.m. CT
- Game weather: 40 °F (4 °C), wind 6 mph (9.7 km/h)

Scoring summary

| Quarter | Time | Drive | | | Team | Scoring information | Score | |
| Quarter | Time | Plays | Yards | TOP | Team | Scoring information | PIT | DEN |
|---|---|---|---|---|---|---|---|---|
| 1 | 11:19 | 8 | 53 | 3:46 | PIT | 45-yard field goal by Shaun Suisham | 3 | 0 |
| 1 | 0:27 | 12 | 24 | 2:04 | PIT | 38-yard field goal by Shaun Suisham | 6 | 0 |
| 2 | 13:31 | 5 | 80 | 1:59 | DEN | Eddie Royal 30-yard touchdown reception from Tim Tebow, Prater kick good | 6 | 7 |
| 2 | 7:33 | 4 | 73 | 2:18 | DEN | Tim Tebow 8-yard touchdown run, Prater kick good | 6 | 14 |
| 2 | 1:08 | 4 | 16 | 1:44 | DEN | 20-yard field goal by Matt Prater | 6 | 17 |
| 2 | 5:09 | 8 | 59 | 4:04 | DEN | 28-yard field goal by Matt Prater | 6 | 20 |
| 3 | 4:33 | 11 | 87 | 5:56 | PIT | Mike Wallace 1-yard touchdown run, Suisham kick good | 13 | 20 |
| 4 | 13:14 | 12 | 63 | 6:19 | DEN | 35-yard field goal by Matt Prater | 13 | 23 |
| 4 | 10:03 | 7 | 61 | 3:11 | PIT | 37-yard field goal by Shaun Suisham | 16 | 23 |
| 4 | 3:56 | 7 | 55 | 3:47 | PIT | Jerricho Cotchery 31-yard touchdown reception from Ben Roethlisberger, Suisham kick good | 23 | 23 |
| OT | 15:00 | 1 | 80 | :11 | DEN | Demaryius Thomas 80-yard touchdown reception from Tim Tebow, (no extra point kick necessary) | 23 | 29 |
| "TOP" = time of possession. For other American football terms, see Glossary of American football. | | | | | | | 23 | 29 |

=== Statistical comparison ===
Statistical comparison
| Statistic | Denver Broncos | Pittsburgh Steelers |
|---|---|---|
| First downs | 21 | 18 |
| Third down efficiency | 3/10 | 7/16 |
| Fourth down efficiency | 0–0 | 0–1 |
| Net yards rushing | 131 | 156 |
| Rushing attempts | 34 | 23 |
| Yards per rush | 3.8 | 6.7 |
| Passing – Completions/attempts | 10/21 | 22/40 |
| Times sacked-total yards | 0–0 | 5–45 |
| Interceptions thrown | 0 | 1 |
| Net yards passing | 316 | 244 |
| Total net yards | 447 | 400 |
| Punt returns-total yards | 3–27 | 0–0 |
| Kickoff returns-total yards | 0–0 | 1–19 |
| Interceptions-total return yards | 1–9 | 0–0 |
| Punts-average yardage | 4–41 | 4–46 |
| Fumbles-lost | 2–1 | 2–0 |
| Penalties-total yards | 5–30 | 6–61 |
| Time of possession | 29:05 | 31:06 |
| Turnovers | 1 | 1 |

=== Overtime ===
2011 was the first year of a new overtime rule in the NFL. Prior to 2011 NFL games that went to overtime were decided by any first score which resulted in sudden death. The game marked the first non-sudden death playoff game in NFL history. The new rule stated that each team would be given the opportunity to be on offense in the overtime unless one team scored a touchdown. The game marked the first playoff game to go to overtime since the new rule was codified in 2010. The exact language of the overtime scoring rule regarding the playoffs:

Each team must possess or have the opportunity to possess the ball unless the team that has the ball first scores a touchdown on its initial possession... At the end of regulation time, the Referee will immediately toss a coin at the center of the field in accordance with rules pertaining to the usual pregame toss. The captain of the visiting team will call the toss prior to the coin being flipped.

The overtime period began with a coin toss to determine who would get their choice to be on offense or defense. The Pittsburgh Steelers were the visiting team and they called tails but the coin landed on heads. The Denver Broncos elected to receive the ball in the overtime period. On the first play of the overtime period, Tim Tebow of the Denver Broncos threw an 80-yard touchdown pass to Demaryius Thomas to win the game by a score of 29–23.

=== 'John 20:24-29' Connection ===
While many fans focused on the game’s connection to John 3:16, some have drawn a connection to how the final play of the overtime mirrored the Bible verse John 20:24-29, the story of Doubting Thomas. The winning drive began on Denver's 20-yard line and concluded with Demaryius Thomas scoring the team's 24th through 29th points. Thomas, born on Christmas Day, died at the age of 33, 16 days before his next birthday.

The final play additionally saw Thomas pursued by Pittsburgh defenders wearing jerseys 24 and 29.

== Legacy ==
During the 3:16 game and into the next day, "John 3:16" was the most searched term on Google Search. The game was also notable for having the shortest overtime in NFL history at the time, taking 11 seconds. The record would later be broken in 2019 by the Atlanta Falcons, in which Deion Jones recorded a pick-six seven seconds into overtime against the Tampa Bay Buccaneers in the final week of the season.

The week after the 3:16 game, during the January 14, 2012, playoff game between the Denver Broncos and New England Patriots a 30-second commercial was aired featuring children reading the Bible verse John 3:16. The commercial aired in the second quarter of the game on CBS. The spot was paid for by the Colorado Christian ministry Focus on the Family. A spokesman for the group said Tebow was not mentioned in the ad, but he was the "cultural phenomenon that inspired it".

In 2016, Tebow appeared on Harry Connick Jr.'s talk show, Harry. Tebow told Connick that after he finished the playoff game against the Steelers he was on his way to talk to the media when a person from the Broncos public relations told him: "it's exactly three years later from the day that you wore John 3:16 under your eyes ... during the game you threw for 316 yards. Your yards per rush were 3.16. Your yards per completion were 31.6. The ratings for the game were 31.6 and the time of possession was 31.6." (Note: The statement included a factual error about Tim Tebow's rushing yards. According to ESPN Tebow had 10 rushes for 50 yards which gave him a 5 yards per rush average.)

The game is thought of as one of the most memorable victories for the Denver Broncos. ESPN referred to the game as "Tim Tebow's finest NFL hour". The Pittsburgh Steelers considered it to be one of the most agonizing defeats in franchise history.

In 2017, one of Tebow's football teammates from college had killed himself after leaving references to John 3:16. Massachusetts State Police stated that convicted murderer and former NFL player Aaron Hernandez hanged himself in his prison cell. They reported that he had written "John 3:16" with red ink on his forehead and in blood on the wall of his prison cell.

== See also ==
- Broncos–Steelers rivalry
- List of nicknamed NFL games and plays
