= Broncos–Steelers rivalry =

National Football League rivalry

- Denver Broncos Pittsburgh Steelers
- Location: Denver, Pittsburgh
- First meeting: September 27, 1970; Broncos 16, Steelers 13
- Latest meeting: September 15, 2024; Steelers 13, Broncos 6
- Next meeting: November 27, 2026
- Stadiums: Broncos: Empower Field at Mile High; Steelers: Acrisure Stadium

Statistics
- Total meetings: 35
- All-time series: Broncos: 20–14–1
- Regular season series: Broncos: 15–11–1
- Postseason results: Broncos: 5–3
- Largest victory: Broncos: 34–7 (1989); Steelers: 42–7 (1979)
- Most points scored: Broncos: 37 (1993); Steelers: 42 (1979)
- Longest win streak: Broncos: 3 (1970–1973); Steelers: 3 (1978–1979)
- Current win streak: Steelers: 3 (2020–present)

Post–season history
- 1977 AFC Divisional: Broncos won: 34–21; 1978 AFC Divisional: Steelers won: 33–10; 1984 AFC Divisional: Steelers won: 24–17; 1989 AFC Divisional: Broncos won: 24–23; 1997 AFC Championship: Broncos won: 24–21; 2005 AFC Championship: Steelers won: 34–17; 2011 AFC Wild Card: Broncos won: 29–23 (OT); 2015 AFC Divisional: Broncos won: 23–16

The Broncos–Steelers rivalry is a National Football League (NFL) rivalry between the Denver Broncos and Pittsburgh Steelers.

The rivalry stemmed from the eight playoff matchups between the two teams, some of which featured upset victories. Of the eight meetings, six resulted in the winner eventually advancing to the Super Bowl. Denver is one of four teams in the AFC with an overall winning record against Pittsburgh (the other three are the Jacksonville Jaguars, New England Patriots, and Las Vegas Raiders).

The Broncos lead the overall series, 20–14–1. The two teams have met eight times in the playoffs, with the Broncos holding a 5–3 record.

== History ==
=== 1970s: Steel Curtain vs. Orange Crush ===
Despite winning six Super Bowl championships compared to the Broncos' three, the Steelers have generally fared worse against the Broncos in their history, losing 20 of 33 matchups with one tie, including a 3–5 playoff record. The Broncos are currently one of four teams to have a winning record against the Steelers, along with the Jacksonville Jaguars, Las Vegas Raiders and New England Patriots.

The two teams first met in the playoffs during the 1977 Divisional Round. In Denver's NFL playoff debut, they defeated the Steelers 34–21 as quarterback Craig Morton scored two touchdowns against Pittsburgh's fabled Steel Curtain defense. On the other hand, Denver's Orange Crush Defense forced three interceptions against Terry Bradshaw. An immediate rematch then took place in the 1978 Divisional Round. Thanks to six Pittsburgh sacks and Bradshaw's two-touchdown and 272-yard performance, the Steelers defeated the Broncos 33–10. In both instances, the winner eventually faced the Dallas Cowboys in the Super Bowl, with the Broncos losing Super Bowl XII and the Steelers winning Super Bowl XIII.

=== 1980s–1990s: John Elway era ===
Legendary Broncos quarterback John Elway made his NFL debut against the Steelers in the 1983 season. The future Hall of Famer completed 1 of 8 passes for 14 yards, was sacked four times and intercepted once. Backup Steve DeBerg eventually led the Broncos to a 14–10 victory. Elway also made his playoff debut against the Steelers in the 1984 Divisional Round. Heading into the match, Denver finished 13–3 and were favored against the 9–7 Steelers. In that game, Elway passed for 184 yards and scored two touchdowns, but was intercepted twice and sacked four times in Denver's 17–24 upset loss. The two teams would meet again in the 1989 Divisional Round. This time, however, Elway performed well, with 239 passing yards, 44 rushing yards, one touchdown and one interception. Mel Bratton's one-yard score sealed the Broncos' 24–23 win, and Denver eventually made it to Super Bowl XXIV in a losing effort. It was also the final playoff game coached by the Steelers' Chuck Noll.

Eight years later, the Broncos and the Steelers faced each other in the 1997 AFC Championship Game. It was a rematch of their Week 15 encounter during the 1997 regular season, in which the Steelers upset the Broncos 35–24 in Pittsburgh. Even though the Broncos had a better record (12–4) than the Steelers (11–5), Pittsburgh hosted the title game by virtue of winning the AFC Central, whereas Denver qualified as a Wild Card. This time, however, Denver avenged its regular season defeat with a 24–21 victory, with the Broncos defense intercepting Steelers quarterback Kordell Stewart three times and Terrell Davis rushing for 139 yards and a touchdown. The victory propelled the Broncos to Super Bowl XXXII, which they won for the first of two consecutive titles. Those titles capped off Elway's Hall of Fame career, retiring after the 1998 season. Ironically, the backup quarterback of the Broncos' two Super Bowl teams under Elway was Bubby Brister, who had faced Elway in the aforementioned 1989 Divisional Round game.

=== 2000s-present: Roethlisberger, Tebow, and P. Manning ===
Another eight-year wait took place before the two teams faced each other in the playoffs. In the 2005 AFC Championship Game, the sixth-seeded Steelers (11–5) were underdogs against the 13–3 Broncos, who had defeated the two-time defending champion New England Patriots in the Divisional Round. However, the Steelers dominated the Broncos in a 34–17 victory. Steelers quarterback Ben Roethlisberger, who was making his first start in the rivalry, finished with 275 passing yards, two passing touchdowns, and one rushing touchdown, while the defense forced four turnovers off Broncos starter Jake Plummer. Pittsburgh went on to win Super Bowl XL, its first since Super Bowl XIV in 1979.

The Broncos and Steelers renewed their rivalry in the 2011 Wild Card Round in what became known as the 3:16 game. The Broncos, despite winning the AFC West and hosting the game, finished with an 8–8 record and were underdogs against the 12–4 Steelers. However, Denver prevailed in a 29–23 overtime upset, as quarterback Tim Tebow passed for an 80-yard touchdown to Demaryius Thomas on the first play. Tebow finished with 316 passing yards, 50 rushing yards and three overall touchdowns, but was traded after the season when the Broncos signed Peyton Manning.

Manning made his Broncos debut against the Steelers during Week 1 of the 2012 season, and led Denver to a 31–19 victory. In that game, Manning finished with 253 yards and two touchdowns on 19–26 passing attempts. The 2015 season would be Manning's last in the NFL, and the two teams faced each other twice. The first was on Week 15 of the regular season, which Pittsburgh won 34–27 as Manning sat out the game due to a bout with plantar fasciitis. However, in the Divisional Round, Denver eliminated Pittsburgh from the playoffs with a 23–16 victory behind their "No Fly Zone" defensive unit led by Von Miller and DeMarcus Ware. Manning, for his part, finished with 222 passing yards to go along with no touchdowns or interceptions, and running back C. J. Anderson sealed the game with a one-yard touchdown run late in the fourth quarter. The Broncos went on to win Super Bowl 50.

The first post-Manning meeting in the rivalry took place on November 25, 2018, in Denver. The 7–2–1 Steelers entered the game as heavy favorites to defeat the 4–6 Broncos. However, in one of the more notable meetings of the rivalry, Broncos QB Case Keenum threw for 197 yards and two touchdowns, with no turnovers, to guide Denver to a 24–17 upset victory. Roethlisberger, meanwhile, threw for 462 yards, including a 97-yard touchdown pass to wide receiver JuJu Smith-Schuster to open the second half scoring, but also threw two costly second-half interceptions, including a goal-line interception to Broncos defensive tackle Shelby Harris on the game's final play that sealed Denver's victory. Despite outgaining the Broncos in total yardage, first downs, yards per play, time of possession, and several other key stats, the Steelers committed four costly turnovers that the Broncos turned into 14 points. This game would also mark the beginning of collapses for both teams to end the season. After this loss, the Steelers proceeded to lose three out of their final five games and finished 9–6–1, missing the playoffs by a half-game and losing the division to the rival Baltimore Ravens. Denver, meanwhile, moved to 6–6 with a win over the Bengals the following week, but then immediately followed that up with a four-game losing streak to end the season with a 6–10 record, leading to the dismissal of head coach Vance Joseph following season's end.

The two teams met at Heinz Field on September 20, 2020, in what was the first home game for Roethlisberger in over a year after he missed all but two games in 2019 due to an elbow injury. After the Steelers knocked out Broncos starting QB Drew Lock early in the first quarter with a shoulder injury, the game was expected to be a runaway Pittsburgh victory, but it was anything but. After falling behind 17–3 at halftime, the Broncos, behind backup QB Jeff Driskel, rallied back to pull within five points heading into the final minutes of the game. After forcing a Steelers punt, the Broncos were facing a fourth down with two yards to go at the Steelers 15-yard line, but Driskel was sacked by Steelers safety Terrell Edmunds to give the ball back to Pittsburgh. Denver had an opportunity to get the ball back again, but Steelers running back James Conner broke away on a 59-yard run to the Broncos 10-yard line, sealing a 26–21 Steelers win. Roethlisberger finished the game with 311 yards, two touchdowns, and an interception, while Conner had 106 yards rushing and a touchdown on 16 carries. Driskel threw for 256 yards, two touchdowns, and an interception in the loss.

On October 10, 2021, the two teams met in Pittsburgh for a Week 5 matchup in what proved to be the final start in the series for Roethlisberger, who retired after the season. Coming into this game with a three-game losing streak, the Steelers led the Broncos 24–6 entering the fourth quarter, but Broncos quarterback Teddy Bridgewater rallied the team back within five points following two touchdown passes. Despite Steelers kicker Chris Boswell kicking a late field goal to make the score 27–19, Bridgewater and the Broncos had a chance to send the game to overtime. Facing fourth-and-goal from the Steelers three-yard line, Bridgewater's final pass was intercepted by Steelers cornerback James Pierre, sealing a Pittsburgh victory and snapping a three-game losing streak for the team. For his career, Roethlisberger finished with a 4–6 record against the Broncos, which included a 1–2 playoff record.

The two teams met on September 15, 2024 in Denver, where Russell Wilson returned to Denver after being released on March 4 and subsequently signing with the Steelers. Although Wilson did not play due to injury, the Steelers came away with a 13–6 win, their first in Denver since 2009.

== Season–by–season results ==
Denver Broncos vs. Pittsburgh Steelers season-by-season results
1970s (Broncos, 5–4–1)

| Season | Results | Location | Overall series | Notes |
|---|---|---|---|---|
| 1970 | Broncos; 16–13 | Mile High Stadium | Broncos; 1–0 | First meeting at Mile High Stadium. First season following the AFL–NFL merger. Steelers move to the American Football Conference. First start in the series for Terry Bradshaw. |
| 1971 | Broncos; 22–10 | Three Rivers Stadium | Broncos; 2–0 | First meeting at Three Rivers Stadium. |
| 1973 | Broncos; 23–13 | Three Rivers Stadium | Broncos; 3–0 | |
| 1974 | Tie; 35–35 (OT) | Mile High Stadium | Broncos; 3–0–1 | First NFL overtime game played in the regular season. Steelers win Super Bowl IX. |
| 1975 | Steelers; 20–9 | Three Rivers Stadium | Broncos; 3–1–1 | Steelers win Super Bowl X. |
| 1977 | Broncos; 21–7 | Mile High Stadium | Broncos; 4–1–1 | |
| 1977 playoffs | Broncos 34–21 | Mile High Stadium | Broncos 5–1–1 | AFC Divisional Round. Broncos lose Super Bowl XII. |
| 1978 | Steelers; 21–17 | Mile High Stadium | Broncos; 5–2–1 | |
| 1978 playoffs | Steelers 33–10 | Three Rivers Stadium | Broncos 5–3–1 | AFC Divisional Round. Steelers win Super Bowl XIII. |
| 1979 | Steelers; 42–7 | Three Rivers Stadium | Broncos; 5–4–1 | Most lopsided Steelers victory of the series. Final start in the series for Terry Bradshaw. Steelers win Super Bowl XIV. |

1980s (Broncos, 5–2)

| Season | Results | Location | Overall series | Notes |
|---|---|---|---|---|
| 1983 | Broncos; 14–10 | Three Rivers Stadium | Broncos; 6–4–1 | John Elway's first NFL game. |
| 1984 playoffs | Steelers 24–17 | Mile High Stadium | Broncos 6–5–1 | AFC Divisional Round. Steelers hand Broncos their first playoff defeat at home. |
| 1985 | Broncos; 31–23 | Three Rivers Stadium | Broncos; 7–5–1 | |
| 1986 | Broncos; 21–10 | Three Rivers Stadium | Broncos; 8–5–1 | Broncos lose Super Bowl XXI. |
| 1988 | Steelers; 39–21 | Three Rivers Stadium | Broncos; 8–6–1 | |
| 1989 | Broncos; 34–7 | Mile High Stadium | Broncos; 9–6–1 | Most lopsided Broncos victory of the series. |
| 1989 playoffs | Broncos 24–23 | Mile High Stadium | Broncos 10–6–1 | AFC Divisional Round. Final playoff game for Steelers head coach Chuck Noll. Broncos lose Super Bowl XXIV. |

1990s (Broncos, 3–2)

| Season | Results | Location | Overall series | Notes |
|---|---|---|---|---|
| 1990 | Steelers; 34–17 | Mile High Stadium | Broncos; 10–7–1 | |
| 1991 | Broncos; 20–13 | Mile High Stadium | Broncos; 11–7–1 | |
| 1993 | Broncos; 37–13 | Mile High Stadium | Broncos; 12–7–1 | Final meeting at Mile High Stadium. |
| 1997 | Steelers; 35–24 | Three Rivers Stadium | Broncos; 12–8–1 | |
| 1997 playoffs | Broncos 24–21 | Three Rivers Stadium | Broncos 13–8–1 | AFC Championship Game. Final start in the series for John Elway. Final meeting at Three Rivers Stadium. Broncos win Super Bowl XXXII. |

2000s (Broncos, 3–2)

| Season | Results | Location | Overall series | Notes |
|---|---|---|---|---|
| 2003 | Broncos; 17–14 | Invesco Field at Mile High | Broncos; 14–8–1 | First meeting at Invesco Field (now Empower Field at Mile High). |
| 2005 playoffs | Steelers 34–17 | Invesco Field at Mile High | Broncos 14–9–1 | AFC Championship Game. First start in the series for Ben Roethlisberger. Steelers win Super Bowl XL, becoming the first #6 seed to do so after no previous #6 seed from either conference ever managed to advance past the Divisional Round (excluding the 1982 strike-shortened season). |
| 2006 | Broncos; 31–20 | Heinz Field | Broncos; 15–9–1 | First meeting at Heinz Field. |
| 2007 | Broncos; 31–28 | Invesco Field at Mile High | Broncos; 16–9–1 | |
| 2009 | Steelers; 28–10 | Invesco Field at Mile High | Broncos; 16–10–1 | |

2010s (Broncos, 4–1)

| Season | Results | Location | Overall series | Notes |
| 2011 playoffs | Broncos 29–23 (OT) | Sports Authority Field at Mile High | Broncos 17–10–1 | AFC Wild Card Round. Demaryius Thomas scores game-winning touchdown reception from Tim Tebow. First NFL overtime game played under modified sudden death rules. |
|---|---|---|---|---|
| 2012 | Broncos; 31–19 | Sports Authority Field at Mile High | Broncos; 18–10–1 | Peyton Manning's first Broncos start. |
| 2015 | Steelers; 34–27 | Heinz Field | Broncos; 18–11–1 | Broncos win Super Bowl 50. |
| 2015 playoffs | Broncos 23–16 | Sports Authority Field at Mile High | Broncos 19–11–1 | AFC Divisional Round. Peyton Manning's final start in the series. |
| 2018 | Broncos; 24–17 | Sports Authority Field at Mile High | Broncos; 20–11–1 | |

2020s (Steelers, 3–0)

| Season | Results | Location | Overall series | Notes |
|---|---|---|---|---|
| 2020 | Steelers; 26–21 | Heinz Field | Broncos; 20–12–1 | |
| 2021 | Steelers; 27–19 | Heinz Field | Broncos; 20–13–1 | Final start in the series for Ben Roethlisberger. |
| 2024 | Steelers; 13–6 | Empower Field at Mile High | Broncos; 20–14–1 | |
| 2026 | November 27 | Acrisure Stadium | Broncos; 20–14–1 | Game will be played on Black Friday. |

Summary of results

| Season | Season series | at Denver Broncos | at Pittsburgh Steelers | Notes |
|---|---|---|---|---|
| Regular season | Broncos 15–11–1 | Broncos 9–4–1 | Steelers 7–6 | |
| Postseason | Broncos 5–3 | Broncos 4–2 | Tied 1–1 | AFC Wild Card: 2011; AFC Divisional: 1977, 1978, 1984, 1989, 2015; AFC Championship: 1997, 2005 |
| Regular and postseason | Broncos 20–14–1 | Broncos 13–6–1 | Steelers 8–7 | |

== See also ==
- National Football League rivalries
