= List of Love It or List It episodes =

Love It or List It is a Canadian home design TV show produced by Big Coat Productions. It is based in the Greater Toronto Area and has spun-off series in other Canadian cities and internationally. The show premiered as a primetime program on W Network on 8 September 2008 and has since aired on OWN Canada as well as HGTV in the United States.

== Series overview ==
Season	Start date	End date	Episodes	Hilary wins	David wins
1	September 8, 2008	January 12, 2009	13	9	4
2	April 6, 2009	December 7, 2009	18	10	8
3	May 3, 2010	November 8, 2010	21	9	12
4	March 14, 2011	November 11, 2011	19	12	7
5	February 20, 2012	November 19, 2012	18	10	8
6	January 19, 2013	July 1, 2013	14	8	6
7	January 8, 2014	April 9, 2014	14	11	3
8	September 8, 2014	January 19, 2015	16	8	8
9	March 9, 2015	December 14, 2015	23	13	10
13	January 2, 2017	March 6, 2017	10	8	2
14	May 7, 2018	June 25, 2018	8	4	4
15	July 2, 2018	January 7, 2019	20	12	8
16	November 18, 2019	January 13, 2020	9	5	4
17	August 10, 2020	November 2, 2020	12	8	3
18	October 11, 2021	December 13, 2021	10	5	5
19	September 5, 2022	May 8, 2023	12	8	4
Total			236	140	96

Season	Start date	End date	Episodes	Page wins	David wins
20	April 21, 2025	June 16, 2025	8	6	2
21	June 23, 2026	September 8, 2026	12	8	4
Total			20	14	6

Victories for Hilary or Page are families or clients who decided to love their home and stay. Victories for David are families and clients who decided to list and move into a new or better home.

== Season 1 ==
Episode no.	Season no.	Episode name	Original air date	Victory	
Episode no.	Season no.	Episode name	Original air date	Hilary	David
1	1	The Challenger Family	September 8, 2008	WIN	
2	1	The Lederman Family	September 15, 2008	WIN	
3	1	The McMinn Family	September 22, 2008		WIN
4	1	The Thompson Family	November 2, 2008		WIN
5	1	The Doudelet Family	November 11, 2008	WIN	
6	1	The Singh Family	November 18, 2008	WIN	
7	1	The Thompson Family 2, Jamie & Helen	November 25, 2008	WIN	
8	1	The Wood Family, Maclean & Suzanne	December 2, 2008	WIN	
9	1	The McGeachie Family	December 9, 2008		WIN
10	1	The Roedger Family	December 1, 2008	WIN	
11	1	The Preston Family	December 8, 2008	WIN	
12	1	The Turner Family	January 5, 2009	WIN	
13	1	The Pliskat Family	January 12, 2009		WIN

== Season 2 ==
Series no.	Season no.	Episode name	Original air date	Victory	
Series no.	Season no.	Episode name	Original air date	Hilary	David
14	1	The Mitchell Family	April 6, 2009	WIN	
15	2	The Tallmeister Family	April 20, 2009		WIN
16	3	The Cunniam Family, Bachelor Pad to Family Home	April 27, 2009		WIN
17	4	The Kowalik Family	June 23, 2009	WIN	
18	5	The Yee Family	July 18, 2009	WIN	
19	6	The McLean Family	July 18, 2009	WIN	
20	7	The Ford-Williams Family, Standing Tall	July 18, 2009		WIN
21	8	The Goddard Family	September 21, 2009		WIN
22	9	The Adamidis Family	September 28, 2009	WIN	
23	10	The Smout Family	October 5, 2009	WIN	
24	11	The Elliott Family	October 19, 2009		WIN
25	12	The Bayda-McLean Family	October 26, 2009	WIN	
26	13	The Sproat Family	November 2, 2009		WIN
27	14	Michael & Jeffery	November 9, 2009		WIN
28	15	The Nguyen Family	November 16, 2009	WIN	
29	16	Ed & Martine via the Richardson Family	November 23, 2009	WIN	
30	17	The Shanahan Family	November 30, 2009	WIN	
31	18	The Gallagher Family	December 7, 2009		WIN
Total				10	8

== Season 3 ==
Series no.	Season no.	Episode name	Original air date	Victory	
Series no.	Season no.	Episode name	Original air date	Hilary	David
31	1	The Ethier Family	May 3, 2010		WIN
32	2	The Cira-Bagnato Family	May 10, 2010		WIN
33	3	Mark and Desta	May 17, 2010	WIN	
34	4	Jim & Connie	May 24, 2010		WIN
35	5	The Matthews-Rooney Family	May 31, 2010	WIN	
36	6	The Smyth Family	June 7, 2010	WIN	
37	7	The Ramos Family	June 14, 2010		WIN
38	8	The McKeon-Bryce Family	June 21, 2010		WIN
39	9	The Dinis Family	June 28, 2010		WIN
40	10	The Pollock-Jones Family	July 5, 2010		WIN
41	11	The Pinnock Family	June 12, 2010		WIN
42	12	Colin & Beth	September 6, 2010	WIN	
43	13	The Hung Family	September 13, 2010	WIN	
44	14	The Renton Family	September 20, 2010		WIN
45	15	Mark & Alana	September 27, 2010		WIN
46	16	The Olmstead Family	October 4, 2010	WIN	
47	17	Kasia & Patrick	October 14, 2010		WIN
48	18	The McPherson Family	October 18, 2010	WIN	
49	19	The Milne Family	October 25, 2010	WIN	
50	20	The Maharishi Family	November 1, 2010		WIN
51	21	The Brown Family	November 8, 2010	WIN	
Total				9	12

== Season 4 ==
Series no.	Season no.	Episode name	Original air date	Victory	
Series no.	Season no.	Episode name	Original air date	Hilary	David
52	1	The O'Hara Family	March 14, 2011		WIN
53	2	The Douglas Family	March 21, 2011		WIN
54	3	The Shaver Family	March 28, 2011	WIN	
55	4	The Denil Family	April 4, 2011	WIN	
56	5	The Robertson Family	April 11, 2011		WIN
57	6	The Wahl Family	April 18, 2011		WIN
58	7	The Smith Family	April 25, 2011	WIN	
59	8	The Cunningham Family	May 2, 2011	WIN	
60	9	The Jaswal Family	May 9, 2011	WIN	
61	10	The Coughlin Family	May 16, 2011		WIN
62	11	The Godoy Family	May 23, 2011		WIN
63	12	The Hunt Family	September 21, 2011	WIN	
64	13	The Banyay Family	September 28, 2011	WIN	
65	14	The Piccione Family	October 5, 2011		WIN
66	15	The Zeleniak Family	October 12, 2011	WIN	
67	16	Dan and Rich	October 19, 2011	WIN	
68	17	The Bukovec Family	October 26, 2011	WIN	
69	18	The Barrett Family	November 2, 2011		WIN
70	19	Sandra and Geoff	November 11, 2011	WIN	
Total				12	7

== Season 5 ==
Series no.	Season no.	Episode name	Original air date	Victory	
Series no.	Season no.	Episode name	Original air date	Hilary	David
71	1	The Pattinson Family	February 20, 2012	WIN	
72	2	The Cullen Family	February 27, 2012	WIN	
73	3	Sharon & Sandra	March 5, 2012	WIN	
74	4	The Fowler Family	March 12, 2012		WIN
75	5	Mary Jo & Glen	March 19, 2012		WIN
76	6	The Cartwright Family	March 26, 2012	WIN	
77	7	The Sinclair Family	April 2, 2012	WIN	
78	8	Joe & Linh	September 10, 2012	WIN	
79	9	Matt & Kelly	September 17, 2012	WIN	
80	10	Heidi & Greg	September 24, 2012	WIN	
81	11	The Richardson Family	October 1, 2012		WIN
82	12	The Young Family	October 8, 2012		WIN
83	13	The Rimes Family	October 15, 2012		WIN
84	14	The Byrne Family	October 22, 2012	WIN	
85	15	Julie & Sherry	October 29, 2012	WIN	
86	16	Niru & Alok, Urban versus Suburban	November 5, 2012		WIN
87	17	The Abbot-Brown Family, Builder's Plan Predicament	November 12, 2012		WIN
88	18	The Finlay Family	November 19, 2012		WIN
Total				10	8

== Season 6 ==
Series no.	Season no.	Episode name	Original air date	Victory	
Series no.	Season no.	Episode name	Original air date	Hilary	David
89	1	The Donovan Family	January 19, 2013	WIN	
90	2	The McWilliams Family	April 8, 2013	WIN	
91	3	Melissa & Oliver	April 15, 2013		WIN
92	4	Catherine & Scott	April 22, 2013		WIN
93	5	Krista & Dave	April 29, 2013	WIN	
94	6	Neilson family	May 6, 2013	WIN	
95	7	Aline & Colin	May 13, 2013		WIN
96	8	Sarena & Flare	May 20, 2013		WIN
97	9	Wendie & Dave	May 27, 2013		WIN
98	10	Mishelle & Ron	June 3, 2013	WIN	
99	11	Rachel and Calum	June 10, 2013	WIN	
100	12	Darlene & Jade	June 17, 2013	WIN	
101	13	Stephanie & Peter	June 24, 2013	WIN	
102	14	Siobhan & Duncan	July 1, 2013		WIN
Total				8	6

== Season 7 ==
Series no.	Season no.	Episode name	Original air date	Victory	
Series no.	Season no.	Episode name	Original air date	Hilary	David
103	1	Leslie & Michael	January 8, 2014	WIN	
104	2	Allison & Robert, Daily Squeeze	January 15, 2014	WIN	
105	3	Katherine, Natalia & Paolo	January 22, 2014	WIN	
106	4	Chelsea & Brian	January 29, 2014	WIN	
107	5	Lorraine & Bob	February 5, 2014	WIN	
108	6	Jacqueline & Bevin	February 12, 2014		WIN
109	7	Brent & John	February 19, 2014	WIN	
110	8	Mike & Danny, Good Cop Bad Cop	February 26, 2014	WIN	
111	9	Irene Marcos	March 5, 2014	WIN	
112	10	Sarah & Andrew	March 12, 2014		WIN
113	11	Kelly & Robin	March 19, 2014	WIN	
114	12	Sachi & Cam	March 26, 2014		WIN
115	13	Jody & Sam	April 2, 2014	WIN	
116	14	The Di Palma Family	April 2, 2014	WIN	
Total				11	3

== Season 8 ==
Series no.	Season no.	Episode name	Original air date	Victory	
Series no.	Season no.	Episode name	Original air date	Hilary	David
117	1	Danielle & Richard	September 8, 2014		WIN
118	2	Pam and Brad	September 15, 2014	WIN	
119	3	Karine & Daphna	September 22, 2014	WIN	
120	4	Deborah and Jay	September 29, 2014		WIN
121	5	Barb & Pete	October 6, 2014		WIN
122	6	Trish & Brian	October 13, 2014		WIN
123	7	Becky & Junior	October 20, 2014		WIN
124	8	Christine & Rick	October 27, 2014	WIN	
125	9	Sue & Bruce	November 3, 2014		WIN
126	10	Michael & Yjay	November 10, 2014		WIN
127	11	Trevor & Janice	November 17, 2014	WIN	
128	12	Georgia & Steve	November 24, 2014	WIN	
129	13	Delilah & Dan	December 1, 2014		WIN
130	14	Kelly & Eric	January 5, 2015	WIN	
131	15	Jamie & Greg	January 12, 2015	WIN	
132	16	Jennifer & Vincent	January 19, 2015	WIN	
Total				8	8

== Season 9 ==
Series no.	Season no.	Episode name	Original air date	Victory	
Series no.	Season no.	Episode name	Original air date	Hilary	David
133	1	Gary & Lauren	March 9, 2015	WIN	
134	2	Matt & Marcy	March 16, 2015		WIN
135	3	Shana & Jeremy	March 23, 2015	WIN	
136	4	Josmell & Carla	March 30, 2015		WIN
137	5	Dwayne & Hong-An	April 6, 2015	WIN	
138	6	Greg & Rodolfo	June 1, 2015		WIN
139	7	Nevada & Kevin	June 8, 2015		WIN
140	8	Thomas & Sarah	June 15, 2015	WIN	
141	9	Marty & Shannon	June 22, 2015		WIN
142	10	Dave & Sonya	June 29, 2015	WIN	
143	11	Shannon & Mason	September 21, 2015	WIN	
144	12	Nathan & Anne	September 28, 2015	WIN	
148	16	Emilee & Jody	October 5, 2015		WIN
145	13	Kim & Tyler	October 12, 2015	WIN	
146	14	Ryan & Sara	October 19, 2015	WIN	
147	15	Lashawn & Lola	October 26, 2015		WIN
149	17	Cole & Ashley	November 2, 2015	WIN	
150	18	Sam & Valerie	November 9, 2015		WIN
151	19	Deena & Sully	November 16, 2015		WIN
152	20	Amanda & Grif	November 23, 2015	WIN	
153	21	John & Kathy	November 30, 2015	WIN	
154	22	Anna & Andrew	December 7, 2015	WIN	
155	23	Ryan & Ashley	December 14, 2015		WIN
Total				13	10

== Season 13 ==
Series no.	Season no.	Episode name	Original air date	Victory	
Series no.	Season no.	Episode name	Original air date	Hilary	David
156	1	Opportunity in the Attic	January 2, 2017		WIN
157	2	Pool House Problems	January 9, 2017	WIN	
158	3	Design Indecision	January 16, 2017	WIN	
159	4	Not Enough Bedrooms	January 23, 2017	WIN	
160	5	Laundry Overload	January 30, 2017	WIN	
161	6	Tree House Trouble	February 6, 2017		WIN
162	7	Overseas Oversight	February 13, 2017	WIN	
163	8	Mother-in-law Matters	February 20, 2017	WIN	
164	9	Too Close for Comfort	February 27, 2017	WIN	
165	10	Pond Paradise	March 6, 2017	WIN	
Total				8	2

== Season 14 ==
Series no.	Season no.	Episode name	Original air date	Victory	
Series no.	Season no.	Episode name	Original air date	Hilary	David
166	1	A Sentimental Situation	May 7, 2018	WIN	
167	2	One Last Renovation	May 14, 2018		WIN
168	3	Community Calling	May 21, 2018		WIN
169	4	Need for Efficiency	May 28, 2018	WIN	
170	5	Happy Trails, Unhappy Home	June 4, 2018		WIN
171	6	Home Working Woes	June 11, 2018	WIN	
172	7	First House Frustrations	June 18, 2018	WIN	
173	8	Kitchen Catastrophe	June 25, 2018		WIN
Total				4	4

== Season 15 ==
Series no.	Season no.	Episode name	Original air date	Victory	
Series no.	Season no.	Episode name	Original air date	Hilary	David
174	1	Picture-Perfect Kitchen	July 2, 2018	WIN	
175	2	Room for One More	July 9, 2018		WIN
176	3	A Hole-in-One Location	July 16, 2018	WIN	
177	4	An Artful Promise	July 30, 2018		WIN
178	5	Elbow Room	August 13, 2018	WIN	
179	6	Small House Great Neighborhood	August 20, 2018		WIN
180	7	Family and Future	September 3, 2018	WIN	
181	8	Second Time Selling	September 10, 2018	WIN	
182	9	Design Intervention	September 17, 2018	WIN	
183	10	Betting the Horse Farm	September 24, 2018		WIN
184	11	All About That Basement	October 8, 2018	WIN	
185	12	Starter Home Stagnation	October 15, 2018		WIN
186	13	Lackluster Lake House	October 22, 2018	WIN	
187	14	Urban vs. Suburban Living	October 29, 2018	WIN	
188	15	The Impossible Dream Home	November 12, 2018		WIN
189	16	Three Brothers and a Bedroom	November 19, 2018		WIN
190	17	All Work and No Place for It	November 26, 2018	WIN	
191	18	Nostalgia Is Not Enough	December 10, 2018		WIN
192	19	Master Office Issues	December 17, 2018	WIN	
193	20	All Work and No Play	January 7, 2019	WIN	
Total				12	8

== Season 16 ==
Series no.	Season no.	Episode name	Original air date	Victory	
Series no.	Season no.	Episode name	Original air date	Hilary	David
194	1	On Shaky Ground	November 18, 2019		WIN
195	2	Custom Chaos	November 25, 2019	WIN	
196	3	A Rock Wall and a Hard Place	December 2, 2019		WIN
197	4	A House Fit for a Queen	December 9, 2019		WIN
198	5	Sister Love or List	December 16, 2019	WIN	
199	6	One Story Story	December 23, 2019	WIN	
200	7	House of Heirlooms	December 30, 2019	WIN	
201	8	This Space Is Looking Up	January 6, 2020	WIN	
202	9	Bachelor Pad Blues	January 13, 2020		WIN
Total				5	4

== Season 17 ==
Series no.	Season no.	Episode name	Original air date	Victory	
Series no.	Season no.	Episode name	Original air date	Hilary	David
	1	A Second Story	August 10, 2020	WIN	
	2	Right-Size Ranch Reno	August 17, 2020	WIN	
	3	No Love for the Land	August 24, 2020	WIN	
	4	1970s Drab to Fab	August 31, 2020	WIN	
	5	Parents and the Pantry	September 7, 2020	WIN	
	6	Decades-Long Debate	September 14, 2020	WIN	
	7	Triplex Troubles	September 21, 2020	WIN	
	8	Design in the Doghouse	September 28, 2020		
	9	To Downsize or Not to Downsize	October 12, 2020		WIN
	10	Downtown Disconnect	October 19, 2020	WIN	
	11	Work-Life Unbalance	October 26, 2020		WIN
	12	No Laughing Matter	November 2, 2020		WIN
Total				8	3

== Season 18 ==
Series no.	Season no.	Episode name	Original air date	Victory	
Series no.	Season no.	Episode name	Original air date	Hilary	David
	1	Into the Great Wide Open	October 11, 2021	WIN	
	2	Love It, List It, Love It?	October 18, 2021		WIN
	3	Downtown Determination	October 25, 2021		WIN
	4	A Tale of Two Davids	November 1, 2021		WIN
	5	Design Intervention	November 8, 2021		WIN
	6	No Room to Salsa	November 15, 2021	WIN	
	7	Time for a Change	November 22, 2021		WIN
	8	Bachelor Pad Overhaul	November 29, 2021	WIN	
	9	Dark and Dated Overhaul	December 6, 2021	WIN	
	10	The '80s Get an Overhaul	December 13, 2021	WIN	
Total				5	5

== Season 19 ==
Series no.	Season no.	Episode name	Original air date	Victory	
Series no.	Season no.	Episode name	Original air date	Hilary	David
	1	Moms at Odds	September 5, 2022		WIN
	2	Kitchen Crisis	September 19, 2022	WIN	
	3	Old Home, New Tricks	September 26, 2022	WIN	
	4	Midcentury Modern Takeover	October 3, 2022	WIN	
	5	A Crowded House	October 10, 2022		WIN
	6	Third Floor Charmer	October 17, 2022	WIN	
	7	Builder Grade Boring	October 24, 2022	WIN	
	8	The Old Crooked House	November 7, 2022		WIN
	9	A Sunroom with a View	April 17, 2023	WIN	
	10	Storage Wars	April 24, 2023	WIN	
	11	Basement Blues	May 1, 2023		WIN
	12	Intersection of Loud and Dated	June 16, 2023	WIN	
Total				8	4

== Season 20 ==
Series no.	Season no.	Episode name	Original air date	Victory	
Series no.	Season no.	Episode name	Original air date	Page	David
	1	A Place to Grow or Go	April 21, 2025	WIN	
	2	Level It Out	April 28, 2025	WIN	
	3	From Childhood to Change	May 5, 2025	WIN	
	4	Home Sweet Overcrowded Home	May 12, 2025		WIN
	5	No Room to Expand	May 19, 2025	WIN	
	6	Too Tight for Family Life?	June 2, 2025	WIN	
	7	Rekindled Romance	June 9, 2025	WIN	
	8	Family Home vs. New Horizons	June 16, 2025		WIN
Total				6	2

== Season 21 ==
Series no.	Season no.	Episode name	Original air date	Victory	
Series no.	Season no.	Episode name	Original air date	Page	David
	1	Four Men and a Lady	June 23, 2026		WIN
	2	My Big Fat Greek Reno	June 30, 2026	WIN	
	3	Get Me Out of the Garage!	July 7, 2026	WIN	
	4	Let Me Entertain You!	July 14, 2026	WIN	
	5	Moving in or Moving On?	July 21, 2026	WIN	
	6	Desperately Seeking Character	July 28, 2026	WIN	
	7	Take the Equity and Run	August 4, 2026		WIN
	8	Tightly Squeezed	August 11, 2026		WIN
	9	Location Locked	August 18, 2026		WIN
	10	Worth the Risk?	August 25, 2026	WIN	
	11	Growing Pains	September 1, 2026	WIN	
	12	A Fixable Problem?	September 8, 2026	WIN	
Total				8	4
