= City on Fire (1979 film) =

1979 Canadian disaster film directed by Alvin Rakoff

- Theatrical release poster
- Directed by: Alvin Rakoff
- Written by: Jack Hill; Dave Lewis; Céline La Frenière
- Produced by: Claude Héroux
- Starring: Barry Newman; Susan Clark; Shelley Winters; Leslie Nielsen; James Franciscus; Ava Gardner; Henry Fonda
- Cinematography: René Verzier
- Edited by: Jacques Clairoux; Jean-Pol Passet
- Music by: Matthew McCauley; William McCauley
- Production company: Astral Bellevue Pathé
- Distributed by: Astral Films (Canada); AVCO Embassy Pictures (US)
- Release dates: May 24, 1979 (West Germany); July 11, 1979 (Paris); August 29, 1979 (Montreal); August 31, 1979 (United States)
- Running time: 106 minutes
- Countries: Canada; United States
- Language: English
- Budget: $3 million
- Box office: $791,605

City on Fire is a 1979 disaster action film directed by Alvin Rakoff, written by Jack Hill, Dave Lewis, and Céline La Frenière, and stars Barry Newman, Susan Clark, Shelley Winters, Leslie Nielsen, James Franciscus, Ava Gardner, and Henry Fonda. The film's plot revolves around a disgruntled ex-employee who sabotages an oil refinery, setting off a blaze that engulfs an entire city. People try to either fight the fire or flee as it spreads throughout the city.

The film was shot in Montreal, Quebec, Canada, although the name of the city is not mentioned in the film.

== Plot ==
In an unnamed U.S. city near the Canadian border, the corrupt mayor William Dudley has allowed an oil refinery to be built right in the center of town, far from any river, lake, or reservoir. On one typically hot summer day, Herman Stover, a dangerously disturbed employee at the refinery, has been denied an expected promotion; additionally, finds himself fired after refusing a departmental transfer. He then decides to take his revenge against the works by opening the valves to the storage vats and their interconnecting pipes, flooding the area and sewers with gasoline and chemicals. It doesn't take long for this act of petty vandalism to start a fire, which starts a chain reaction that causes massive explosions at the refinery, destroying it and spreading a mushroom cloud of flame that soon engulfs the entire metropolis.

The drama focuses on a newly built hospital that, like the refinery and all civic buildings that went up during the mayor's crooked administration, is shoddily built and poorly equipped. There, head doctor Frank Whitman and his staff treat thousands of casualties from the fire, while the city fire chief Risley keeps in constant contact with the fire companies fighting a losing battle against the flames. Meanwhile, Maggie Grayson, an alcoholic reporter, sees it as her chance to make it nationwide with her coverage of the "city on fire."

A major subplot of the film involves Diana Brockhurst-Lautrec, a wealthy socialite (and widow of the late governor who is the namesake of the hospital) who is currently and secretly involved with Mayor Dudley to further advance her rank up the social hierarchy. The womanizing Dr. Whitman also meets with Diana before the hospital's dedication ceremony, having known her previously. Herman Stover also arrives at the hospital during the dedication ceremony, having left the refinery before the explosion to stalk Diana, whom he has known since high school. Diana, the mayor, and head nurse Andrea Harper treat the large number of casualties arriving at the hospital. No one ever discovers that Stover is the one responsible for the citywide fire; moreover, Stover is not sane enough to understand or regret his actions.

When the hospital becomes surrounded by the fire, Chief Risley orders his son, Captain Harrison Risley, and his firemen to create a "water tunnel" with firehoses across a burning street to serve as an evacuation route. Despite some casualties of the hospital staff and patients, the evacuation is successful. Stover is one of the casualties when, distraught and dazed after Diana rejects him, he is killed by falling debris from a building. Nurse Harper is also killed when she attempts to rescue Stover. Diana, Mayor Dudley, and Dr. Whitman are the last to make it out of the hospital before it is consumed by the fire.

The final scene is set the following day at a quarry outside the city that has become a bivouac for the thousands of people rendered homeless by the fire as it is finally brought under control. There, Dr. Whitman and Diana acknowledge their love for each other, while Mayor Dudley gives a press statement that the real heroes are the people of the city. Maggie Grayson, still reporting from the studio, signs off the broadcast and leaves with her assistant Jimbo on a date. Chief Risley leaves his headquarters with his staff, telling them that it takes only one man to destroy a city.

== Cast ==
- Barry Newman as Dr. Frank Whitman
- Susan Clark as Diana Brockhurst-Lautrec
- Shelley Winters as Nurse Andrea Harper
- Leslie Nielsen as Mayor William Dudley
- James Franciscus as Jimbo
- Ava Gardner as Maggie Grayson
- Henry Fonda as Chief Albert Risley
- Jonathan Welsh as Herman Stover
- Hilary Farr as Mrs. Adams (credited as Hilary Labow)
- Mavor Moore as John O'Brien
- Richard Donat as Fire Captain Harrison Risley
- Terry Haig as Terry James
- Ken James as Deputy Fire Captain Andrew Sommers
- Donald Pilon as Dr. Matwick
- Cec Linder as Councilman Paley
- Jefferson Mappin as Beezer
- Murray Cruchley as Tony Miller
- Jérôme Tiberghien as Fireman Joseph Waller
- Mel Ryane as Nurse Florence Stoddard
- Anthony Sherwood as Sam Keller
- Nancy Beatty as Mary Stover

== Production ==
The film required several urban blocks that could be set on fire, which led production to search for appropriate locations to shoot, including Atlanta, Edmonton, St. Louis, and Cincinnati. Montreal was eventually chosen to represent the fictional American city.

Principal photography was scheduled to begin August 10, 1978, becoming one of the largest film sets in Canada at the time, eventually costing about $400,000. The shoot was constructed in the east side of the city and required approximately 45,000 gallons of fuel to set it ablaze during filming.

== Release ==
City on Fire was first shown in West Germany on May 24, 1979, then in Paris, France on July 11, 1979. It was later distributed in Canada by Astral Films, showing in Montreal on August 29, 1979. It opened in the United States on August 31, 1979.

== Reception ==
In a contemporary review, Gilbert Adair of the Monthly Film Bulletin declared that "'dull' as criticism, scarcely does justice to the ludicrous contrivance of this disaster movie," and that "its idiocy is best exemplified by the scene in which, as the crooked mayor and the jet-setting benefactress of a hospital resolve their amours differences, the camera focuses on the beatific expression of an elderly patient who has finally managed to relieve himself into a bedpan." City on Fire was picked as the week's worst movie by Gene Siskel on the "Dog of the Week" segment of the review show, Sneak Previews.

The film later became a target for riffing in episode #16 of Mystery Science Theater 3000 during its KTMA era.

== See also ==
- List of firefighting films
