= Hilary Farr =

British-Canadian designer, businesswoman, television host and actress

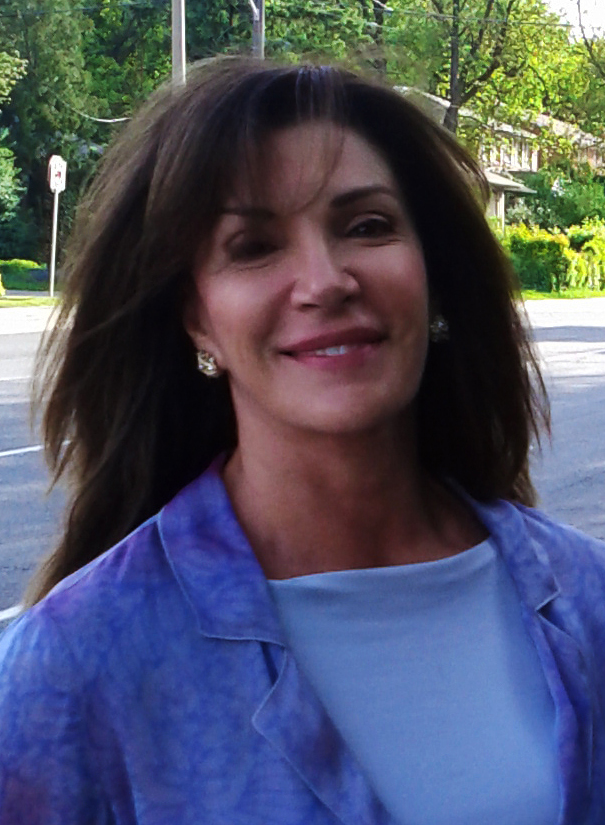
- Farr in 2012
- Born: Hilary Elizabeth Labow; August 31, 1951 (age 75); Toronto, Ontario, Canada
- Education: Toronto Metropolitan University
- Occupations: Designer; businesswoman; television host; actress
- Years active: 1972–present
- Notable credit(s): Love It or List It (2008–2023)
- Spouse: Gordon Farr (m. 1982; div. 2008)
- Children: 1
- Website: www.hilaryfarr.com

Hilary Elizabeth Farr (née Labow) is a British-Canadian designer, businesswoman, television host and former actress. She is known as the former co-host of the HGTV reality television series Love It or List It with David Visentin.

Born in Toronto and raised in London, Farr began her career in Los Angeles working as a home renovator as well as designing film and television sets. During this time, she occasionally worked as an actress, appearing in minor roles in such films as The Rocky Horror Picture Show (1975), City on Fire (1979), and The Return (1980).

== Early life ==
Farr was born in Toronto, Ontario, Canada on August 31, 1951 to a British mother and a Canadian father. Her mother was an Anglican and a member of the Church of England, and her father was Jewish. Farr was raised celebrating both Jewish and Christian religious traditions.

Farr was raised in London, where she attended the Royal Ballet School until age 11, and aspired to have a career as a ballerina. She took an interest in theatre and was introduced to interior design by helping her mother to decorate her childhood home.

== Career ==
=== Acting ===
Farr began her career in Los Angeles, where she began purchasing and renovating homes, as well working as a film and television set designer. Acting under the name Hilary Labow, Farr made small appearances in Layout for 5 Models (1972), Sex Farm (1973), Never Mind the Quality, Feel the Width (1973), Legend of the Werewolf (1975), City on Fire (1979) and The Return (1980). Her most notable film role would be from the cult classic The Rocky Horror Picture Show (1975) where she played Betty Munroe, a bride who tosses her bouquet into a crowd, which Janet Weiss (played by Susan Sarandon) catches. Farr recounted that she used to live in the same building with one of the film's lead Tim Curry who plays Dr. Frank-N-Furter, prior to landing that role. In the early 1980s, she had small parts in various television sitcoms while working as a personal assistant for Ted Danson and Arthur Cohn.

In Broadway and Theatre, Farr played the role of Betty Rizzo and the singing role of Marty in the stage performance of Grease in London with actor Richard Gere who played Danny Zucko. In 2016, Farr appeared in Ross Petty's stage version of Sleeping Beauty at the Elgin Theatre in Toronto, in the role of Malignicent. (Although the character is more commonly known as Maleficent, she was renamed "Malignicent" for this production.)

=== Love It or List It ===
Farr auditioned and was the first to be signed into the role of co-host and designer of Love It or List It with Big Coat Productions (now Big Coat TV). The show was first broadcast on the W Network in Canada in September, 2008. The series became a top performer along with the network's other realty home and design originals and was later picked up by HGTV in 2011.

Farr left Love It or List It in 2023.

In 2017, Farr co-founded Rules of Renovation, a real estate investment seminar series held at locations across North America for aspiring investors.

== Personal life ==
Farr married Canadian TV producer Gordon Farr in 1982. She gave birth to their son in 1983. The couple divorced in 2008.

Farr has noted she has a passion for animal rescue, and in 2017 volunteered in Nairobi with an organization protecting orphaned elephants.

In December 2021, Farr said she had been diagnosed with and treated for breast cancer in 2014. She had previously been diagnosed with a precancerous tumour in 2012, which she had surgically removed. A subsequent mammogram revealed Farr had developed malignant breast cancer. She underwent radiation therapy and further surgical intervention, and remains in remission as of 2022.

== Filmography ==
Film
Year	Title	Role	Notes
1972	Layout for 5 Models	Monique	
1973	Frustrated Wives	Cheryl Hope	Original title was known as Sex Farm
1973	Never Mind the Quality, Feel the Width	Gina	
1974	Stardust	Unknown role	
1975	Legend of the Werewolf	Zoe	
1975	The Rocky Horror Picture Show	Betty Munroe	
1979	City on Fire	Mrs. Adams	
1979	A Man Called Intrepid	Ingrid	
1980	The Return	Lee Ann	
2022	Designing Christmas	Freddie	

Television
Year	Title	Role	Notes
1976	Well Anyway	Maria	Season 1 Episode 2: On the Other Hand
1976	Within These Walls	Trixie Hall	Season 4 Episode 17: Silent Night
1979	A Man Called Intrepid	Ingrid	3 episode
1982	The Greatest American Hero	Erika Van Damme	Season 2 Episode 11: The Hand Painted Thai
1984	We Got It Made		Season 1 Episode 21: A Paige in David's Life
1987	Days of Our Lives	Felicity York	2 episode
2008–2023	Love It or List It	Co-host	Actress/Designer
2015	This Hour Has 22 Minutes	Herself	1 episode
2021–present	Tough Love with Hilary Farr	Host	Host and Principal Designer

Broadway
Year	Title	Role	Notes
1973	Grease	Betty Rizzo	
2014	Malignicent	Malignicent	Produced by Ross Petty

Media
Year	Title	Role	Notes
2012	The Marilyn Denis Show	Herself	
2012	Steven and Chris	Herself	
2012-	eTalk	Herself	
2012-	HuffPost Live	Herself	
2013	The Hour	Herself	
2013-2016	Brother Vs. Brother	Herself - Guest Judge	Reality TV series produced by the Property Brothers, was also featured on the highlights episode.
2013	Makeover Manor	Herself	A YouTube comedy sketch produced by Scott Brothers Entertainment.
2015	HGTV Insider	Herself - HGTV Host	TV documentary
2015-	The Today Show	Herself	
2016	Your Morning	Herself	
2017	Harry	Herself	
2018	Megyn Kelly Today	Herself	
2020	Couched with Carson Kressley	Herself	
2020	The Kelly Clarkson Show	Herself	
2022	The Morning Show	Herself	
2022	Celebrity Page	Herself	
2023	Entertainment Tonight	Herself	
