= Eye black =

Glare reducer

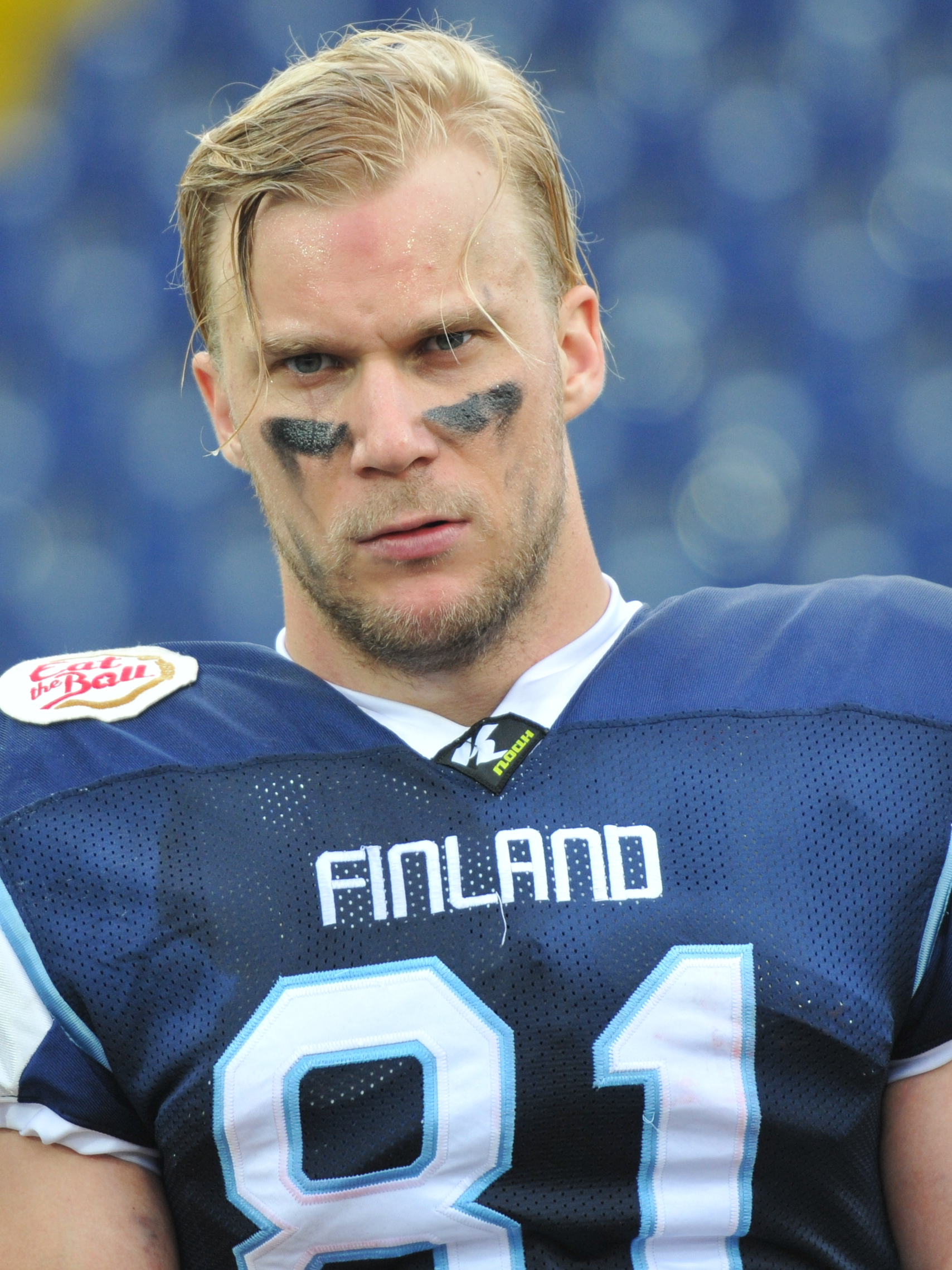
Tommi Pinta, a Finnish player of American football, wearing eye black

Eye black is a grease or strip applied under the eyes intended to reduce glare, although studies have not conclusively proven its effectiveness. It is often used by American football, baseball, softball, and lacrosse players to mitigate the effects of bright sunlight or stadium floodlights.

== History ==
One of the earliest known instances of a player wearing eye black is baseball legend Babe Ruth, who, in or around the 1930s, used the grease in an attempt to reduce sun glare. According to Paul Lukas of ESPN.com, eye black caught on with American football player Andy Farkas. He also states that the original eye black was made from the ashes of burned cork.

== Effectiveness ==
=== 2003 Yale study ===
A 2003 study by Brian DeBroff and Patricia Pahk tested whether black eye grease actually had anti-glare properties. The subjects of the study were divided into three groups: wearers of eye black, wearers of anti-glare stickers, and wearers of petroleum jelly. The subjects' vision was tested using an eye chart while being exposed to natural sunlight.

The study concluded that eye black reduced glare of the sun and improved contrast sensitivity, whereas commercial anti-glare stickers and petroleum jelly (the control substance) were found to be ineffective.

However, the study was subject to unavoidable demand bias, wherein the test subjects could have unconsciously changed their responses during testing based on the fact that they knew which substance they were wearing. Also, the petroleum jelly could have introduced glare that would not occur on natural skin and the study did not test a control condition of natural skin. Learning bias is also a factor in the results due to chart repetition.

=== 2005 University of New Hampshire study ===
A study by Benjamin R. Powers at University of New Hampshire, which improved on DeBroff's methodology, found eye black to reduce glare from the sun in women and in those whose eye-color was not blue. The study also tested males and blue-eyed subjects. However, the results were not statistically significant due to a too-small sample size of those test subjects. Some testing was also performed indoors under artificial lighting when inclement weather prohibited outdoor testing. However, those results showed little difference and were not statistically significant. The Powers study was not a double-blind study because those in contact with the test subjects knew which substance was applied. Also, the eye tests were performed at a distance of only 1.15 metres (3 ft 9 in).

=== MythBusters test ===
On an episode of MythBusters, Adam Savage and Jamie Hyneman tested whether eye black reduces glare. They determined that, while eye black does not eliminate glare, it does improve an athlete's ability to differentiate between light and dark, enhancing a player's ability to track moving objects in a sunny environment.

== Messages in eye black ==
Some athletes, particularly at the college level, began a practice of writing short messages on their adhesive eye black stickers. The trend gained traction among football players in the mid-2000s, popularized by Reggie Bush, who featured homages to his hometown; other popular messages included Bible verses, memorial tributes, and licensed university logos. The displays began to garner widespread media attention surrounding Tim Tebow, who used Bible verse references. This practice was banned on April 14, 2010, when the NCAA Playing Rules Oversight Panel (PROP) approved a proposal effecting "that players are not allowed to have any symbols or messages on their eye black starting in the 2010 season."

The National Football League's rulebook stipulates players are barred from "wearing, displaying or otherwise conveying personal messages either in writing or illustration, unless such message has been approved in advance by the League office." Fines are handed out for infractions. These include motivational quotes, (Note: In 2008, Fred Jackson was fined $5,000 for wearing eye black with the phrase "DIII", in reference to his NCAA Division III college career.) profane statements, (Note: In 2024, George Pickens was fined $10,231 for the phrase "Open Fucking Always".) tributes, (Note: In 2008, Ryan Clark was fined $5,000 for honoring his late teammate Sean Taylor with Taylor's number "21".) and religious messages. (Note: In 2026, Kei'Trel Clark was fined $6,651 for "Glory Be 2 God" on his eye black.) Players have been fined for raising awareness via their eye black, like Azeez Al-Shaair for the Gaza genocide on multiple occasions since 2025, and Cameron Heyward and DeAngelo Williams for cancer awareness; the latter fines were issued despite taking place during the NFL's Breast Cancer Awareness Month campaign. Conversely, Devon Still did not get a fine for his 2014 eye black supporting his daughter's cancer battle. The NFL can also fine players for wearing too much eye black.

In 2012, Toronto Blue Jays player Yunel Escobar played a game with a homophobic slur written on his eye black. He was suspended for three games as a result.

== In nature ==
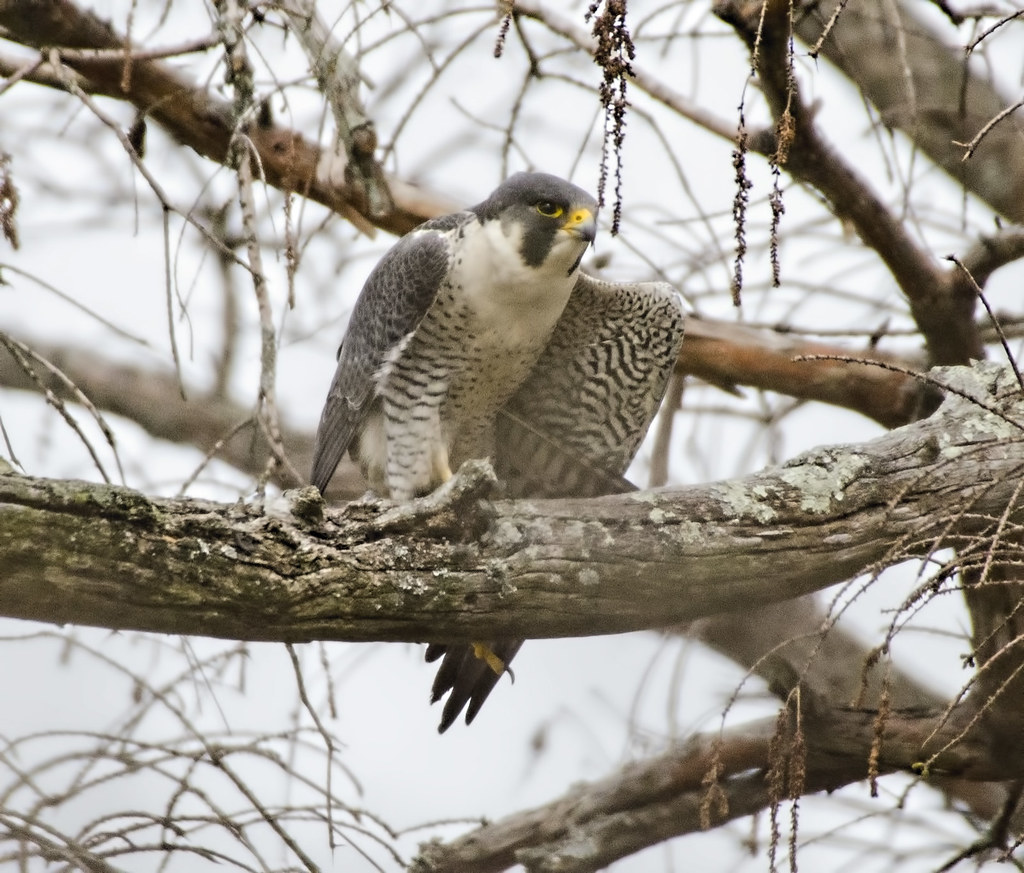
A peregrine falcon sitting in a tree, displaying its malar stripes as it watches for prey

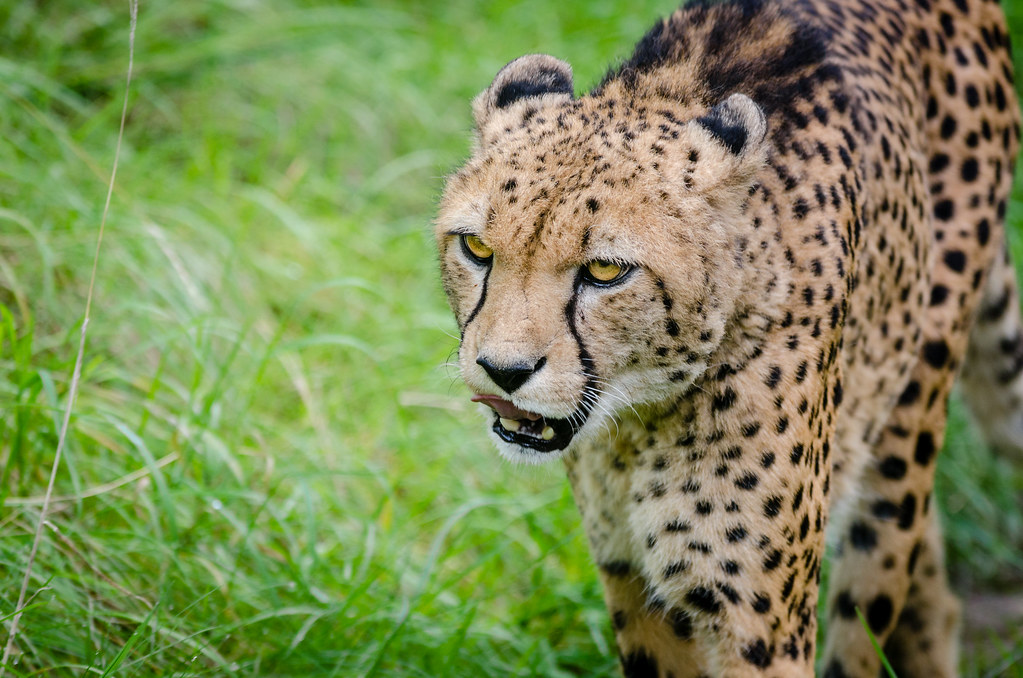
Close-up image of a cheetah, showing its malar stripes

Some birds, such as the peregrine falcon and the common kestrel, have black feathering underneath their eyes on their cheekbone, called a malar stripe. This stripe evolved over time to serve the same purpose as it does in humans as described above, which is to reduce the glare from the sun into the bird's eyes, thus making it easier to spot prey. This evolutionary trait is not exclusive to birds, as some land mammals like the cheetah also have similar markings on their face to aid with tracking prey.
