= Todd Talbot =

Canadian actor

- Born: Todd Talbot; June 12, 1973 (age 52); Vancouver, British Columbia, Canada
- Occupations: Television host Realtor
- Years active: 1990-present
- Notable credit(s): Love it or List it Vancouver (2013-present)
- Spouse: Rabecca Codling (m. 2007)
- Children: 2

Todd Talbot (born June 12, 1973) is a Canadian actor and television personality. He is best known for his work as one of the co-hosts of Love it or List it Vancouver (Love it or List it Too in the U.S.) which airs on the W Network and HGTV in Canada and HGTV in the U.S. Talbot also played the role of Matt Walker in the Canadian/American teen drama Hillside.

== Career ==
Born in Vancouver, Talbot began his acting career cast alongside fellow Canadian Ryan Reynolds in the Canadian TV series Hillside (known as Fifteen in the US), which aired on Nickelodeon in the United States and YTV in Canada from 1991 to 1993. He then traveled to England to study acting, singing and dancing. Talbot has a passion for live theater and has performed all over the world. After returning to television and films, he was cast in various roles until he signed on to co-host Love it or List it Vancouver in 2013. Since March 2007, he has been married to international singer and model Rebecca Talbot, with whom he has a son and a daughter.

=== 2013-present: Love it or List it Vancouver ===
Talbot and Jillian Harris were both signed as co-hosts of Love it or List it Vancouver. The series debuted in January 2013. He also contributes online blogs to the W Network. Talbot has also made appearances on local and national news and daytime talk shows, including Breakfast Television, Global News Morning, The Morning Show, CTV Morning Live and The Marilyn Denis Show.

In 2024 he launched the new series Todd Talbot Builds: The Passive House Project on Cottage Life.

== Filmography ==
Film and television
Year	Title	Role	Notes
1990	Hillside (Fifteen: US Title)	Matt Walker	
2000	The Outer Limits	Reed Hollingsworth	Season 6, episode 17: Gettysburg (1 episode)
2000	Evireti	Tall Castrato	Short Film
2001	Sarah Brightman: La Luna- LIVE in Concert	Dancer	
2001	Josie and the Pussycats	Fiona's Dancer	
2001	Night Visions	Private Rasky	Season 1 Episode 3: A View from the Window/Quiet Please
2001	The Swinging Nutcracker	Sugar Plum Fairy/Tony	TV movie
2002	Dark Angel	Paramedic #1	Season 2 Episode 13: Harbor Lights
2002	Taken	Tony Woodruff	Season 1 Episode 4: Acid Tests
2003	Smallville	Dr. Trenton	Season 2 Episode 16: Fever
2005	Young Blades	Father Antoine	Season 1 Episode 8: Coat of Arms; Season 1 Episode 10: The Invincible Sword
2013–2019	Love it or List it Vancouver	Co-Host	
2018	An American in Paris - The Musical	The Company	
2021	Everybody's Taking about Jamie	Dancer	
