= David Visentin =

Canadian television host

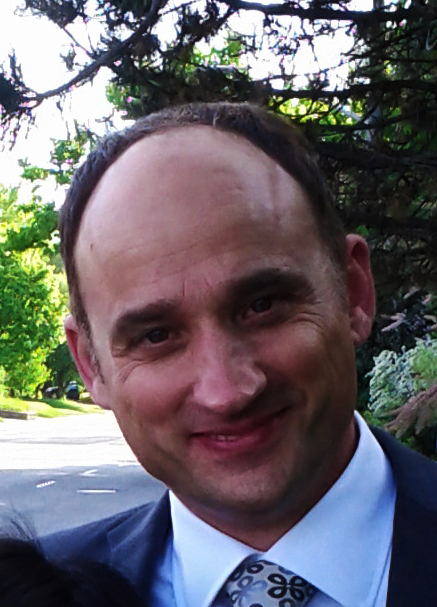
- Visentin in 2012
- Born: Toronto, Ontario, Canada
- Occupations: Realtor; Television host
- Years active: 2008–present
- Notable credit(s): Love It or List It (2008–present)
- Children: 1

David Visentin is a Canadian actor, reality television personality, realtor and commentator. He is best known for his role as a co-host of the reality television series Love It or List It, with co-host Page Turner, which airs on HGTV.

== Early life ==
Visentin was born and raised in Toronto, Canada with three other siblings. His father is Nick Visentin, a working realtor who started his own realty firm known as 'Country Living Realty'. David attended and graduated West Humber Collegiate Institute. After finishing high school, David wanted to pursue a career in acting and was looking into attending a theatre school. However his father opposed the idea and persuaded him to pursue his real estate license instead. However it was noted that his father did give David the option to pursue Theatre if he wanted to, just as along as he had his real estate license as a back up. At the time, obtaining a real estate license in the province of Ontario was estimated to be roughly six weeks and both David's brothers and sister obtained their licenses, so David followed suit. After obtaining his license, David began his career in 1987 working as an agent under his family business 'Country Living Realty' in Barrie, Ontario, while working alongside his father.

== Career ==
=== Love It or List It ===
The Canadian television production company 'Big Coat Productions' (now Big Coat Media) held auditions for Love it or List it. Hilary Farr was the first to be cast into the role of designer. David auditioned for the show and was the second to be cast into the role of realtor. David recalled casting producers telling him “You’re brilliant. We want you. We think you’re going to make Hilary look good.” The show premiered on the W Network on September 8, 2008, with both Farr and Visentin sharing co-hosting duties as competitive rivals. Visentin's role in the show is to convince home owners to leave or "list" their home, while Farr attempts to renovate the homeowner's home at an agreed budget. Visentin does this by showing them a series of homes that could sway them to leave. In an interview with People magazine, both Visentin and Farr agreed "that their good-natured bickering is what has contributed to their series' success."

In 2023, after 19 seasons with the show, Hilary Farr announced that she has decided leave the show. The show was put in hiatus while producers search for her replacement. In 2025, Page Turner was announced as Farr's successor and would taking on the role of designer and David's rival competitor prior to the show's 20th season launch.

=== Other roles ===
Aside from his role on Love it or List it, Visentin has also served either as a guest or contributor on various morning news or talk show programs including The Marilyn Denis Show, Harry, The Kelly Clarkson Show and The Today Show. Visentin also joined Fox News Radio as a guest discussing the effects of the COVID-19 pandemic and the major shifts on the housing market and renovations. He also contributes for various news services and publications such as the Canadian Press. and Time magazine.

== Filmography ==
=== Television ===
Year	Title	Role	Notes
2008-	Love it or List it	Co-host	Remains as the original host, cohost Hilary Farr left the show in 2023.
2011	Kourtney and Dave: By Request	Himself	
2012-2015	The Marilyn Denis Show	Himself	Featured as a guest and real estate expert on the former daytime talk show that aired on CTV.
2013	Makeover Manor	Himself	A YouTube comedy sketch produced by Scott Brothers Entertainment.
2013-2016	Brother Vs. Brother	Celebrity Guest Judge	Reality TV series produced by the Property Brothers, was also featured on the highlights episode.
2015	HGTV Insider	Himself	TV documentary
2015-	The Today Show	Himself	
2017	Harry	Himself	
2018	Megyn Kelly Today	Himself	
2020	The Kelly Clarkson Show	Himself	
2022	Luxe For Less	Himself	
2025	Extra	Himself	Interviewed by Mona Kosar Abdi.
2025	Entertainment Tonight	Himself	Interviewed by Rachel Smith.
2025	Tamron Hall	Himself	
2025	WNBC (News 4 New York)	Himself	Interviewed by Ashley Bellman and Dahiana Perez for NYL (New York Live) segment.

=== Radio and Podcasts ===
Year	Title	Role	Notes
2021	Fox News Radio	guest	The Fox News Rundown Podcast
2013	640 Toronto	guest	The Real Estate Talk Show

== Personal life ==
Visentin is of Italian and Scottish descent and currently resides in Barrie, Ontario, with his wife and son.
