= Harry (talk show) =

American syndicated talk show (2016–2018)

- Genre: Talk show
- Presented by: Harry Connick Jr.
- Country of origin: United States
- Original language: English
- No. of seasons: 2
- No. of episodes: 299

Production
- Production locations: CBS Broadcast Center, New York City, New York
- Running time: 60 minutes
- Production companies: HC Productions; Kurtzy Productions; Stangel Bros. Productions; NBCUniversal Television Distribution

Original release
- Network: Syndication
- Release: September 12, 2016 – May 23, 2018

Harry is an American syndicated talk show hosted by Harry Connick Jr. and produced in association with NBCUniversal Television Distribution. The show premiered on September 12, 2016. The show was renewed for a second season.

It marked Connick’s return to television for the first time since the 2009 incident from Hey Hey It's Saturday in Australia to promote his new self-titled talk show.

In February 2018, NBCUniversal Television Distribution announced that it canceled Harry after two seasons and would not renew it for a third season. The show's final episode aired on May 23, 2018, with reruns airing until September 7.

== Format ==
Host Harry Connick Jr. talks about current news, does freestyle events and games. Celebrities come to talk to Harry, and at the end, Harry chats with the audience. Being geared towards families, Harry often does special features such as an entire show with only kids in the audience or his segment Super Teens which featured 3 teens making a difference in the world.

== Reception ==
Harry's average viewership was about 1.3 million for the first season. The show's first season premiered with a 1.4 household rating in the metered markets and a 0.7 rating in the women 25-54 demographic.

=== Critical response ===
Harry received mixed reviews from critics and the public. The show was championed by the Fox O&O group as a different spin on the daytime talk show format.

=== Awards and nominations ===
Harry was nominated for five Daytime Emmy Awards.
