= Shaynna Blaze =

Australian interior designer, TV personality and writer

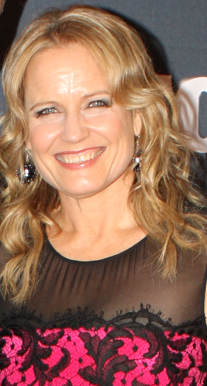
- Blaze at the Foxtel Launch Event, February 2013
- Born: 2 April 1963 (age 63)
- Occupations: Interior designer; television personality; writer; former singer
- Years active: 2008–present
- Employer: Nine Network
- Children: 2

Shaynna Blaze (born 2 April 1963) is an Australian interior designer, television personality, writer and former singer. She is best known for her work as a co-host on Selling Houses Australia (2008–2020) and a judge on The Block (2012–present). In 2021 she won Celebrity Apprentice Australia. In early 2024, Blaze released her debut single "Warrior".

== Early life ==
Blaze was born in Melbourne, Australia in 1963, to Basil and Anette, who she credits as her inspiration. She became interested in interior design as a teenager, and earned a degree in design after completing high school and designed commercial interiors at Reece Plumbing.

She married her first husband, and they had two children. Following her divorce, she found it "hard to run a business as a single mum" and worked as a jazz singer for 10 years, singing in clubs while her parents babysat. Blaze returned to interior design after remarrying.

== Career ==
=== Television ===
Blaze was working for herself and taking on residential design projects, until a 2007 advertisement in a design newsletter caught her eye. That ad led to her filming an audition tape which then led to her becoming a co-host on Selling Houses Australia, alongside real estate expert Andrew Winter and landscape designer Charlie Albone in 2008.

In 2012, she was hired as a judge on Channel 9's team renovation show, The Block.

She filmed a pilot episode for her own interior design series, Blank Canvas with Shaynna Blaze, which aired on The LifeStyle Channel in April 2013. In 2013 and 2014, Blaze won the ASTRA Award for Favourite Personality – Female, and she co-hosted the 2014 ceremony with Matt Shirvington.

On 7 and 14 December 2015, a two-part TV special, Shaynna's World of Design, aired on LifeStyle Home. It saw Blaze create a range of interior lighting and travel the globe to gather design inspiration from each place she visited. She also shared her own ideas and design principles along the way, not just for interior lighting, but for everything in the home. In 2016, she hosted Deadline Design on LifeStyle Home.

Buying Blind was a one-season show that aired in 2018 in which Blaze and two other experts purchase houses for couples who have signed over their life savings and given a list of requirements for their dream home.

In March 2021, Blaze announced she would be leaving Selling Houses Australia due to a busy schedule.

Blaze competed in the fifth season of The Celebrity Apprentice Australia in 2021 and succeeded as the winner. Blaze helped to raise over $300k for her charity of choice, Voice of Change, which supports survivors of family violence.

In 2023, Blaze was revealed to be the "Bluebottle" on the fifth season of Network 10's The Masked Singer Australia. She was eliminated in episode 4 after her second performance.

=== Publications ===
In March 2013, Blaze released Design Your Home, an interior design book published by Penguin Books Australia. Her second book, Design with Colour and Style, was released on 25 March 2015.

Blaze occasionally writes design columns for Stellar Magazine, The Herald Sun and Grand Designs Magazine.

=== Business ===
Founded in 2005, Blank Canvas Interiors is Blaze's interior design company which is based in Hawthorn East, Victoria. Her approach to design is "functionality of the layout is number one, then I look at the quality and suitability of the fixtures and surfaces, then the colours and styling at the end. A bad design is bad design, no matter how pretty it is". Blaze is known for her ability to quickly and creatively know what could be changed in a floorplan, light and colour to improve a space.

Blaze is a brand ambassador for the Attic Group, Granite Transformations, and Taubmans paint. Blaze has designed products for brands including Molmic, Urban Road, Harris Scarfe and One World Lighting.

=== Music ===
On 3 May 2024, Blaze released her debut single "Warrior". Blaze said before releasing the album that appearing on season 5 of The Masked Singer had reignited a passion to sing again after revealing she had given up singing to support her family. On 1 November 2024, Blaze released her EP Sweeter Than Life and the new single "Meet Me In the Middle".

== Personal life ==
Blaze's father, Basil, a fitter and turner, died of a heart attack in 1998. After her mother died of Alzheimer's in 2016, Blaze was approached by an aged care developer to design a facility, which she accepted.

Blaze has a son and a daughter from her first marriage. She later married personal trainer Steve Vaughan, and was credited by her married name, Shaynna Blaze-Vaughan, in early seasons of Selling Houses Australia. After 18 years of marriage she separated from Vaughan in August 2018. They divorced in 2023.

Blaze once dreamed of being an air hostess, but at only 5 foot 3 inches (160 cm) tall, she was too short. Blaze's hobbies include yoga, meditation, sketching, painting, reading and walking her pet border collie.

Blaze is an advocate for women, and a social justice campaigner who has supported a number of organisations tackling domestic violence in Australia. Blaze has MCd candlelight vigils for women and children lost to family violence and presented keynotes at International Women's Day events.

Blaze was the executive producer of The Fort, a 2021 feature film about a woman's battle to escape her abusive marriage while attempting to shelter her son from the realities of domestic violence.

== Filmography ==
=== Television ===
Year	Title	Role	Notes
2008–20	Selling Houses Australia	Herself / co-host	148 episodes
2012–present	The Block	Herself / Judge	Since season 5
2013	Blank Canvas with Shaynna Blaze	Herself	Pilot episode
2015	Shaynna's World of Design	Herself	2 episode special
2016	Deadline Design	Herself	10 episodes
2016	Upper Middle Bogan	Herself	Season 3 Episode "New Kids on The Block"
2018	Buying Blind	Herself	
2021	Celebrity Apprentice Australia	Herself	Series winner
2022	Country Home Rescue	Herself / Host	6 Episodes, appearing with her kids Carly & Jess
2023	The Masked Singer	Herself / Contestant	2 Episodes, as Bluebottle

== Awards and nominations ==
Year	Award	Work	Category	Result	Ref
2013	ASTRA Award	Selling Houses Australia	Favourite Personality – Female	Won	
2014	ASTRA Award	Selling Houses Australia	Favourite Personality – Female	Won	
2015	ASTRA Award	Selling Houses Australia	Most Outstanding Presenter – Female	Nominated	
2016	AACTA Award	Selling Houses Australia	Best Female Presenter	Nominated	
2018	AACTA Award	Selling Houses Australia	Best Female Presenter	Won	
