= The Block season 22 =

Season of television series

The Block
- Season 22
- No. of episodes: 50

Release
- Original network: Nine Network
- Original release: 2 August – 1 November 2026

Season chronology
- ← Previous; Season 21

The twenty-second season of Australian reality television series The Block which premiered on 2 August 2026 on the Nine Network. Hosts Scott Cam and Shelley Craft, Dan Reilly returns as site foreman and judges Shaynna Blaze, Darren Palmer and Marty Fox all returning from the previous season.

== Production ==
In August 2025, it was reported that Nine had bought a 1.35ha site which contains six blocks of land at 109 Old Mornington Rd, Mt Eliza, for $11 million. Auditions for the 22nd season opened in September 2025 with shooting expected to begin in February 2026 for 12 weeks. In October 2025, the 22nd season and location was officially confirmed at Nine’s 2026 upfronts. Filming of the series began in mid-March 2026. In a first for the series, the contestants were living together in a share house off site in Mount Eliza. In July 2026, the contestants were revealed along with the Airdate of 2 August 2026. On 16 October 2026, the reserves were revealed to be $3.45 million for every house. The auctions took place on Saturday, 31 October 2026, and the episode premiered the next day on 1 November 2026.

== Contestants ==
House	Couple	Age	Location	Relationship	Occupations
1	Adam & Jolene Wagner	48 & 42	Roxby Downs, South Australia	Married with children	Cattle station managers
2	Chantel Green & Wyatt Randall	32 & 30	Gold Coast, Queensland	Couple with children	Online fitness coach/stay-at-home mum & Personal trainer
3	Lisa & Rosco Wilson	34 & 38	Perth, Western Australia	Married with a child	Paramedic/registered nurse & FIFO logistics expert
4	Courtney Kain & Sevilay (Sev) Keser	34 & 37	Brisbane, Queensland	Best friends	Site manager (commercial construction) & commercial interior designer
5	Rick & Tayla Peroomal	63 & 32	Altona, Victoria	Father & Daughter	Personal trainer & Business owner

== Scotty’s prize pool ==
Before week 3 reveals, Scotty announced the winner of the series will receive extra prizes to take home on top of their auction profits & $100k winning prize. Scotty introduced a Plungie plunge pool worth $55k (which the winning team will have put into the backyard of their actual home, not their block home) and every week he will add something new.

Week	Prize
1	—N/a
2	—N/a
3	$55k Plungie pool & $50k cash
4	2 $5.2k E-bikes from Amp'd
5	$80k bar crusher boat
6	$6.5k Speediance Gym Monster 2 and Elsewhere Pods portable gym
7	$11k 100 inch LG TV and Sonos sound system from JB Hi-Fi
8	$50k art package from Michael Parker Gallery, Artist Lane and Manyung Gallery
9	$50k kitchen from Kinsmen, $10k of flooring from FlooringXtra, $10k of wine from Levantine Hill and $10k worth of snacks supplied by Arnott's
10	$10k safe & $15k Rolex
11	$60k Chery motorcar
12	$10k Titanium Luggage & $20k cash

== Score history ==
Teams' progress summarised through the competition
	Teams				
	Adam & Jolene	Chantel & Wyatt	Lisa & Rosco	Courtney & Sev	Rick & Tayla
Rooms	Scores				
Guest Bedroom	22	20	19 1/2	26	17
Family Bathroom	24 1/2	21 1/2	15 1/2	25 1/2	18 1/2
Main Bedroom & WIR	25	25	27	17	22
Main Ensuite	21	25 1/2	20 1/2	25	26
Living, Dining & Alfresco Terrace	27	19 1/2	26	22 1/2	22
Guest Suite	25 1/2	25 1/2	23 1/2	29 1/2	17
Kitchen, Pantry, WC & Lift	29 1/2	23	28 1/2	27 1/2	25 1/2
Rumpus & Laundry	26 1/2	23	28	29 1/2	24
Kids Bedroom & Re-Do Room	21 1/2	17 1/2	29	30	21 1/2
Outdoor Terrace & Pool	29	25 1/2	22	28 1/4	21 1/2
Backyard & Garage	34 1/2	29 1/2	31 1/2	34 1/2	30
Front Yard & Facade	26 1/2	26	26	22	27 1/2

=== Weekly Room Expenditures ===
Week	Room(s)	Budget ($250k)	Costs				
Week	Room(s)	Budget ($250k)	Adam & Jolene	Chantel & Wyatt	Lisa & Rosco	Courtney & Sev	Rick & Tayla
1	Guest Bedroom	$10,000	$9,850	$9,000	$8,995	$16,000	$9,600
2	Family Bathroom	$20,000	$37,816.82	$29,565.75	$36,342.54	$53,272.33	$11,065.51
3	Main Bedroom & WIR	$20,000	$27,975.08	$35,933.92	$28,560.50	$22,176.77	$25,350.59
4	Main Ensuite	$20,000	$23,516.86	$27,285.55	$28,350.62	$26,241.50	$16,359.58
5	Living, Dining & Alfresco Terrace	$20,000	$40,054.36	$23,385.16	$40,181.39	$17,486.16	$49,593.30
6	Guest Suite	$30,000	$17,002.10.	$27,484.65	$29,900.14	$32,418. 98	$30,406.27
7	Kitchen, Pantry, WC & Lift	$20,000	$25,281.82	$27,713.37	$21,311.69	$23,584.41	$21,744.98
8	Rumpus & Laundry	$30,000	$33,880.29	$26,605.88	$29,105.88	$26,939.41	$39,029.24
9	Kids Bedroom & Re-Do Room	$20,000	$16,734.24	$14,319.10	$14,016.33	$12,225.15	$11,984.7
10	Outdoor Terrace & Pool	$20,000	$39,079.85	$55,314.78	$21,369.02	$36,806.22	$30,472.73
11	Backyard & Garage	$30,000	$98,799.37	$47,215.66	$72,754.23	$89,784.64	$56,467.64
12	Front Yard & Facade	$20,000	-	-	-	-	-
Winnings			$215,000	$112,500	$165,000	$212,500	$110,000
Running Total Costs			$369,990.71	$323,823.82	$330,887.34	$356,965.57	$302,074.54

=== Weekly Room & Best Budget Prize ===
Week	Room	Winning team	Prize
1	Guest Bedroom	Courtney & Sev	$10k and a night away courtesy of Chery
2	Family Bathroom	Courtney & Sev	$10k, $250k worth of appliance and a night away courtesy of Chery
3	Main Bedroom & WIR	Lisa & Rosco	$10k and a night away courtesy of Chery
4	Main Ensuite	Rick & Tayla	$10k and a night away courtesy of Chery
5	Living, Dining & Alfresco Terrace	Adam & Jolene	$10k and a night away courtesy of Chery
6	Guest Suite	Courtney & Sev	$10k, $20k for getting two 10’s & and a night away courtesy of Chery
7	Kitchen, Pantry, WC & Lift	Adam & Jolene	$10k, $10k for scoring a 10, $30k bar of gold for whomever buys the house & $60k of Dekton tiles and a night away courtesy of Chery
8	Rumpus & Laundry	Courtney & Sev	$10k, $20k for scoring two 10's and a night away courtesy of Chery
9	Kids Bedroom & Re-Do Room	Courtney & Sev	$10k & a night away courtesy of Chery, $30k for scoring three 10's and $10k from Domain
10	Outdoor Terrace & Pool	Adam & Jolene	$10k & a night away courtesy of Chery
11	Backyard & Garage	Adam & Jolene	$5k each & a night away courtesy of Chery
11	Backyard & Garage	Courtney & Sev	$5k each & a night away courtesy of Chery
12	Front Yard & Facade	Rick & Tayla	$50K off their reserve price

After the weekly winning team is announced, the team that keeps the best track of their budget at the end of each week will win 10k to their budget.

Week	Best Budget Team	Prize
1	Lisa & Rosco	$10k
2	Chantel & Wyatt	$10k
3	Courtney & Sev	$10k
4	Chantel & Wyatt	$10k
5	Chantel & Wyatt	$10k
6	Adam & Jolene	$10k
7	Lisa & Rosco	$10k
8	Lisa & Rosco	$10k
9	Chantel & Wyatt	$10k
10	Lisa & Rosco	$10k
11	Lisa & Rosco	$10k

== Results ==
=== Judges' Scores ===
Colour key:
Highest Score
Lowest Score

Summary of Judges' Scores
Week	Area(s)	Scores	Teams				
Week	Area(s)	Scores	Adam & Jolene	Chantel & Wyatt	Lisa & Rosco	Courtney & Sev	Rick & Tayla
1	Guest Bedroom	Alice	7 1/2	7	7	9	6
1	Guest Bedroom	Marty	7	6	6	8 1/2	5
1	Guest Bedroom	Shaynna	7 1/2	7	6 1/2	8 1/2	6
1	Guest Bedroom	Total	22	20	19 1/2	26	17
2	Family Bathroom	Darren	8 1/2	7 1/2	6 1/2	8 1/2	7
2	Family Bathroom	Marty	8	7	5	8 1/2	6 1/2
2	Family Bathroom	Shaynna	8	7	4	8 1/2	5
2	Family Bathroom	Total	24 1/2	21 1/2	15 1/2	25 1/2	18 1/2
3	Main Bedroom & WIR	Darren	8 1/2	8 1/2	9	6	7 1/2
3	Main Bedroom & WIR	Marty	8	8 1/2	9	5	7 1/2
3	Main Bedroom & WIR	Shaynna	8 1/2	8	9	6	7
3	Main Bedroom & WIR	Total	25	25	27	17	22
4	Main Ensuite	Darren	6 1/2	9	6 1/2	8 1/2	8 1/2
4	Main Ensuite	Marty	7 1/2	8 1/2	6	8	8 1/2
4	Main Ensuite	Shaynna	7	8	8	8 1/2	8+1
4	Main Ensuite	Total	21	25 1/2	20 1/2	25	26
5	Living, Dining & Alfresco Terrace	Darren	9	6 1/2	8	8	7
5	Living, Dining & Alfresco Terrace	Marty	8 1/2	6 1/2	9	7	7 1/2
5	Living, Dining & Alfresco Terrace	Shaynna	9 1/2	6 1/2	9	7 1/2	7 1/2
5	Living, Dining & Alfresco Terrace	Total	27	19 1/2	26	22 1/2	22
6	Guest Suite	Darren	8 1/2	9 1/2	7 1/2	10	6
6	Guest Suite	Marty	9	8 1/2	8	10	5
6	Guest Suite	Shaynna	8	7 1/2	8	9 1/2	6
6	Guest Suite	Total	25 1/2	25 1/2	23 1/2	29 1/2	17
7	Kitchen, Pantry, WC & Lift	Darren	9 1/2	8	9 1/2	9 1/2	8 1/2
7	Kitchen, Pantry, WC & Lift	Marty	10	7 1/2	9 1/2	9	8 1/2
7	Kitchen, Pantry, WC & Lift	Shaynna	9 1/2 +1	7 1/2	9 1/2	9	8 1/2
7	Kitchen, Pantry, WC & Lift	Total	30	23	28 1/2	27 1/2	25 1/2
8	Rumpus & Laundry	Darren	9 1/2	8	9 1/2	9 1/2	8
8	Rumpus & Laundry	Marty	8 1/2	7 1/2	9	10	8
8	Rumpus & Laundry	Shaynna	8 1/2	7 1/2	9 1/2	10	8
8	Rumpus & Laundry	Total	26 1/2	23	28	29 1/2	24
9	Kids Bedroom & Re-Do Room	Darren	7 1/2	6 1/2	9 1/2	10	7 1/2
9	Kids Bedroom & Re-Do Room	Marty	7	6	10	10	7
9	Kids Bedroom & Re-Do Room	Shaynna	7	5	9 1/2	10	7
9	Kids Bedroom & Re-Do Room	Total	21 1/2	17 1/2	29	30	21 1/2
10	Outdoor Terrace & Pool	Darren	9 1/2	9 1/2	7 1/2	9 1/2	7 1/2
10	Outdoor Terrace & Pool	Marty	9 1/2	8 1/2	7	9 3/4	6 1/2
10	Outdoor Terrace & Pool	Shaynna	9+1	7 1/2	7 1/2	9	7 1/2
10	Outdoor Terrace & Pool	Total	29	25 1/2	22	28 1/4	21 1/2
11	Backyard & Garage	Dave	8 1/2	7 1/2	8	8 1/2	7 1/2
11	Backyard & Garage	Darren	9	8	8	9	7 1/2
11	Backyard & Garage	Marty	8 1/2	7	7 1/2	8 1/2	8
11	Backyard & Garage	Shaynna	8 1/2	7	8	8 1/2	7
11	Backyard & Garage	Total	34 1/2	29 1/2	31 1/2	34 1/2	30
12	Front Yard & Facade	Dave	9	8 1/2	8 1/2	7 1/2	9
12	Front Yard & Facade	Darren	8 1/2	9	8 1/2	7 1/2	9
12	Front Yard & Facade	Shaynna	9	8 1/2	9	7	9 1/2
12	Front Yard & Facade	Total	26 1/2	26	26	22	27 1/2

=== Challenge scores ===
Summary of challenge scores
Week	Challenge		Reward	Teams				
Week	Challenge	Description	Reward	Adam & Jolene	Chantel & Wyatt	Lisa & Rosco	Courtney & Sev	Rick & Tayla
1	House Decider Challenge	Create the best and highest scoring guest bedroom	Decides their house	1	2	3	4	5
2	Styling Challenge	Each team having 30 minutes to jazz up a glamping tent at Peninsula Hot Springs	$10,000, a night at the Peninsula Hot Springs eco-lodge and the “Snooze button”	—	—	Won	—	—
3	Tennis Challenge	Be the winning team in the grand final of several tennis matches	$5,000	—	—	Won	—	—
4	Dog Kennel Challenge	Build the best dog kennel	$10,000 & Bonus Point Gnome	—	—	—	—	Won
5	Freedom Challenge	style the best lounge	$5,000	—	—	Won	—	—
6	Cooking Challenge	serve the best meal using local mussels	$10,000, Speediance Gym Station & Bonus Point Gnome	Won	—	—	—	—
7	Penalty Shootout Challenge	Score the most penalty shots on ice inside a Zorb	$10,000	Won	—	—	—	—
8	Community Challenge	In two teams, transform an apartment unit at Ranch 2.0 crisis accommodation.	$10,000	Team B	Team A	Team B	Team A	Team B
9	Domain open home Challenge	Teams open their homes to the public and the team with the most scores in percentage wins	$50,000 and a secret gnome	29%	20%	23%	13%	15%
10	Athletics Carnival Challenge	Win the most in an athletics carnival	$10,000	Won	—	—	—	—
10	Archery Challenge	score the most in the archery challenge	$10,000 & a $10,000 safe	—	—	—	—	Won
11	Cheryoke	Lipsync the best to a fake song inside a Chery vehicle	$10,000	—	—	—	-	Won
11	YouFoodz challenge	Make the best meal	$10,000 & sauna	—	—	Won	—	—
12	Stan Sport Trivia Challenge	Win the most trivia questions	$10,000	Won	—	—	—	—

== Auction ==
Auction results
Rank	Couple	Reserve	Auction Result	Profit made	Total Profit	Auction Order
1	Courtney & Sev	$3.45m	$4.72m	$1.27m	$1.37m & $500k prize pool	2
2	Rick & Tayla	$3.45m (Note: When reserves were revealed, Rick & Tayla had the highest reserve of $3.5m, but due to winning $50k off their reserve, it went down to $3.45m, the same as the other teams.)	$4.355m	$905,000	$905,000	5
3	Lisa & Rosco	$3.45m	$4m	$550,000	$550,000	3
4	Adam & Jolene	$3.45m	$3.905m	$455,000	$455,000	1
5	Chantel & Wyatt	$3.45m	$3.817m	$367,000	$367,000	4

== Ratings ==
The Block 2026 National Reach and Total viewership and nightly position Colour key: – Highest rating during the series – Lowest rating during the series
Week	Episode		Original airdate	Timeslot	National Reach Viewers (millions) (Note: Ratings data is from OzTAM and represents the National Reach and National average viewership)	National Total Viewers (millions)	Nightly rank	Source
1	1	"Welcome to The Block"	2 August 2026	Sunday 7:00 pm	2.207	1.110	3	
1	2	"Guest Bedrooms begin"	3 August 2026	Monday 7:30 pm	1.703	0.965	4	
1	3	"Guest Bedrooms mid-week"	4 August 2026	Tuesday 7:30 pm	1.746	0.984	3	
1	4	"Guest Bedrooms continues"	5 August 2026	Wednesday 7:30 pm	1.785	0.898	3	
2	5	"Guest Bedrooms revealed"	9 August 2026	Sunday 7:00 pm	2.445	1.309	1	
2	6	"Family Bathrooms begin"	10 August 2026	Monday 7:30 pm	2.168	1.276	1	
2	7	"Family Bathrooms mid-week"	11 August 2026	Tuesday 7:30 pm	1.933	1.075	3	
2	8	"Styling challenge"	12 August 2026	Wednesday 7:30 pm	1.704	1.025	3	
3	9	"Family Bathrooms revealed"	16 August 2026	Sunday 7:00 pm	2.448	1.362	2	
3	10	"Main Bedrooms & WIRs begin"	17 August 2026	Monday 7:30 pm	2.066	1.073	3	
3	11	"Main Bedrooms & WIRs continue"	18 August 2026	Tuesday 7:30 pm	1.841	1.031	3	
3	12	"Tennis challenge"	19 August 2026	Wednesday 7:30 pm	1.849	1.013	3	
4	13	"Main Bedrooms & WIRs revealed"	23 August 2026	Sunday 7:00 pm	2.488	1.398	1	
4	14	"Main Ensuite begins"	24 August 2026	Monday 7:30 pm	1.981	1.084	3	
4	15	"Main Ensuite continues"	25 August 2026	Tuesday 7:30 pm	1.948	1.045	3	
4	16	"Dog Kennel Challenge"	26 August 2026	Wednesday 7:30 pm	1.896	1.001	3	
5	17	"Main Ensuite revealed"	30 August 2026	Sunday 7:00 pm	2.397	1.368	2	
5	18	"Living, Dining, & Terrace week begins"	31 August 2026	Monday 7:30 pm	1.955	1.078	3	
5	19	"Living, Dining, & Terrace week continues"	1 September 2026	Tuesday 7:30 pm	1.931	1.112	3	
5	20	"Freedom Challenge"	2 September 2026	Wednesday 7:30 pm	1.785	1.005	3	
6	21	"Living, Dining, & Terrace revealed"	6 September 2026	Sunday 7:00 pm	2.472	1.399	1	
6	22	"Guest Suite week begins"	7 September 2026	Monday 7:30 pm	1.885	1.090	3	
6	23	"Guest Suite week continues"	8 September 2026	Tuesday 7:30 pm	1.873	1.066	3	
6	24	"Cooking Challenge"	9 September 2026	Wednesday 7:30 pm	1.680	0.989	3	
7	25	"Guest Suite revealed"	13 September 2026	Sunday 7:00 pm	2.550	1.416	1	
7	26	"Kitchen week begins"	14 September 2026	Monday 7:30 pm	2.034	1.076	3	
7	27	"Zorb Challenge"	15 September 2026	Tuesday 7:30 pm	1.991	1.094	2	
7	28	"Kitchen week continues"	16 September 2026	Wednesday 7:30 pm	1.935	1.085	3	
8	29	"Kitchens revealed"	20 September 2026	Sunday 7:00 pm	2.571	1.460	2	
8	30	"Rumpus & Laundry week begins"	21 September 2026	Monday 7:30 pm	1.894	1.075	4	
8	31	"Rumpus & Laundry week continues"	22 September 2026	Tuesday 7:30 pm	1.939	1.103	2	
8	32	"Community challenge"	23 September 2026	Wednesday 7:30 pm	1.860	1.051	3	
9	33	"Rumpus & Laundry revealed"	28 September 2026	Monday 7:30 pm	1.943	1.190	3	
9	34	"Kids Bedroom & Re-Do Room week begins"	29 September 2026	Tuesday 7:30 pm	1.768	1.028	3	
9	35	"Kids Bedroom & Re-Do Room week continues"	30 September 2026	Wednesday 7:30 pm	1.803	0.968	3	
9	36	"Domain open home challenge"	1 October 2026	Thursday 7:30 pm	1.872	1.024	3	
10	37	"Kids Bedroom & Re-Do Room revealed"	5 October 2026	Monday 7:30 pm (Note: Room reveal episode changed to Monday due to 2026 NRL Grand Final airing in sunday timeslot)	2.241	1.237	1	
10	38	"Outdoor Terrace & Pool Week begins"	6 October 2026	Tuesday 7:30 pm	2.045	1.127	2	
10	39	"Athletics Carnival Challenge"	7 October 2026	Wednesday 7:30 pm	1.729	1.006	4	
10	40	"Outdoor Terrace & Pool Week continues"	8 October 2026	Thursday 7:30 pm	1.817	0.971	2	
11	41	"Outdoor Terrace & Pool Week revealed"	11 October 2026	Sunday 7:00 pm	2.417	1.417	3	
11	42	"Backyard & Garage Week Begins"	12 October 2026	Monday 7:30 pm	1.889	1.079	4	
11	43	"Backyard & Garage Week continues"	13 October 2026	Tuesday 7:30 pm	1.880	1.058	3	
11	44	"Cheryoke Challenge"	14 October 2026	Wednesday 7:30 pm	1.846	1.050	3	
12	45	"Backyard & Garage Week reveal"	18 October 2026	Sunday 7:00 pm	2.432	1.480	1	
12	46	"Front Yard & Façade Week Begins"	19 October 2026	Monday 7:30 pm	1.966	1.112	3	
12	47	"Stan Sport Trivia Challenge"	20 October 2026	Tuesday 7:30 pm	1.857	1.085	3	
12	48	"Front Yard & Façade Week Continue"	21 October 2026	Wednesday 7:30 pm	1.882	1.084	2	
12	49	"Front Yard & Façade Week reveal"	25 October 2026	Sunday 7:00 pm	2.457	1.445	2	
12	50	"Grand Final/ Auctions"	1 November 2026	Sunday 7:00 pm	2.977	1.928	1	
