= Buying Blind =

- Created by: Kinetic Content
- Starring: Shaynna Blaze; Rich Harvey; Marshal Keen
- Country of origin: Australia
- Original language: English
- No. of seasons: 1
- No. of episodes: 6

Production
- Running time: 60-90 minutes
- Production company: Endemol Shine Australia

Original release
- Network: Nine Network
- Release: 5 June – 10 July 2018

Buying Blind is an Australian reality television series broadcast on the Nine Network on 5 June 2018. The series follows couples and families who sign over their life savings to three experts that make the crucial decisions of finding, purchasing, and renovating a property that meets their expectations.

== Production ==
The series was announced at Nine Network’s 2018 upfronts in October 2017. In February 2018, production of the series commenced with the buying of several properties. In May 2018, The Block / Selling Houses Australia expert, Shaynna Blaze, buyer’s agent Rich Harvey & builder Marshal Keen were announced as the series experts. The series was scheduled to air on 29 May 2018, however Nine made an amendment and instead placed Young Sheldon in its timeslot, the series was rescheduled and aired on 5 June 2018. The series was narrated by Damian Walshe-Howling.

== Episodes ==
| No. | Title | Original release date | Australian viewers |
|---|---|---|---|
| 1 | "Jess & Fotis" | 5 June 2018 | 647,000 |
| 2 | "Lis & Ali" | 12 June 2018 | 622,000 |
| 3 | "Tyson & Mags" | 19 June 2018 | 563,000 |
| 4 | "Jenna & Dallas" | 26 June 2018 | 567,000 |
| 5 | "Mel & Andrew" | 3 July 2018 | 643,000 |
| 6 | "Kristen & Mal" | 10 July 2018 | 501,000 |
