= ASTRA Awards =

Australian awards ceremony

- Awarded for: Excellence in subscription television
- Country: Australia
- Presented by: Australian Subscription Television and Radio Association
- First award: 2003
- Final award: 2015 (folded into AACTA Awards)
- Website: astra.org.au (defunct)

The ASTRA Awards were the annual awards for the Australian subscription television industry. According to the Australian Subscription Television and Radio Association (ASTRA), the awards "recognise the wealth of talent that drives the Australian subscription television industry and highlight the creativity, commitment and investment in production and broadcasting."

The ASTRA Awards were instituted in 2003, but were discontinued after November 2015, when ASTRA announced the awards would be folded into the annual AACTA Awards.

== 2003 ==
- Best Program Event – AUSTAR's Switched on schools program (AUSTAR)
- Best Integrated Subscription TV Campaign – Net MD Walkman (IKON Communications)
- Best Integrated Subscription TV Campaign – The Office (UKTV)
- Best Consumer Advertising for a Platform or Channel – Take Your Sports Seriously (AUSTAR & FOX SPORTS)
- Most Outstanding Local Production (Kids & Youth) – Foul Facts (Nickelodeon)
- Most Outstanding Local Production (Sport) – From the Lips of Lethal (FOX Footy Channel)
- Most Outstanding Local Production – News & Documentaries – One Track Minds, Understanding Autism (The Lifestyle Channel)
- Most Outstanding Local Production (General Entertainment) – Home, Series 2, Episode 6 (The Lifestyle Channel)
- Most Outstanding Contribution to Subscription TV or Radio – Peter Smart, Director of Engineering & Information Services, FOXTEL

== 2004 ==
- Best Program Event – Channel [V] Billabong Bus (Channel [V])
- Favourite Overseas Production Premiering on Subscription TV – Antiques Roadshow (The LifeStyle Channel)
- Best Consumer Campaign to Drive Subscription Sales – Amelie (World Movies)
- Best Consumer Campaign to Encourage Customer Loyalty – Eyeballs-a-GO-GO – (Cartoon Network)
- Best Media Campaign for a Consumer Product on Subscription Television – Thredbo, Snow How (FOXTEL)
- Best Media Campaign for a Channel or Platform – MTV's Exquisite Corpse Campaign (MTV)
- Best Program for a Program or Series – MTV's Australian Top 30 (MTV)
- Best Campaign Launch for a Program or Series – Six Feet Under (Arena TV)
- Most Outstanding Australian Production Short Form – Magda's Big Things (TV1)
- Most Outstanding Australian Production (Kids) – Kids Yakkity Yak (Nickelodeon)
- Most Outstanding Australian Production (Music) – The Big Day Out Sydney 2003 – Channel [V] The Max Sessions – Series Ones (Music Max)
- Most Outstanding Australian Production (Sport) – Super 12 Rugby (FOX Sports)
- Most Outstanding Australian Production (Documentary) – Anita Cobby: Not Another Murder Documentary (Sky News Australia)
- Most Outstanding Australian Production (News) – Labor Leadership, Latham (Sky News Australia)
- Most Outstanding Australian Production (General Entertainment) Croc Hunter Live – Animal Planet (Discovery Networks)
- Favourite Australian Production – Food Source New Zealand (The LifeStyle Channel)
- Favourite Subscription Television Presenter (Male) – Brendan Moar (The LifeStyle Channel)
- Most Outstanding Consumer Campaign (Subscriber Retention) Super Safari Watch 'n Win (Disney Channel)
- Favourite Subscription Television Presenter (Female) – Magda Szubanksi (TV1)
- Most Outstanding on Camera Performance (Male) – Barry Humphries (The Comedy Channel)
- Most Outstanding on Camera Performance (Female) Magda Szubanski (TV1)
- Channel of the Year – The LifeStyle Channel
- Rising Talent – Fiona Lawson-Baker
- Most Outstanding Contribution to Subscription Television – Patrick Delany / Scott Cain – Disney Channel

== 2005 ==
- Channel of the Year – Fox Sports
- Favourite Programming Event – MAX Sessions (MAX)
- Favourite International Program or Event – Race to the Moon (The History Channel)
- Favourite Program – Neil Perry: Rockpool Sessions (The LifeStyle Channel)
- Favourite New Presenter – Bill Granger (The LifeStyle Channel)
- Favourite Female Presenter – Shannon Fricke (The LifeStyle Channel)
- Favourite Male Presenter – Brendan Moar (The LifeStyle Channel)
- Most Outstanding Program Event – Antiques Roadshow (The LifeStyle Channel)
- Most Outstanding Short Form Program – Cooking for Kids with Luis (Nick Jr.)
- Most Outstanding Children's Program – Cooking for Kids with Luis (Nick Jr.)
- Most Outstanding Music Production – Band in a Bubble (Channel [V])
- Most Outstanding Sports Production – Sports Active Grand Final: From the Coaches Box (FOX Footy Channel)
- Most Outstanding Documentary – Driven to Distraction: ADHD (The LifeStyle Channel)
- Most Outstanding News Production – Election 2004 (Sky News)
- Most Outstanding General Entertainment Program – Love My Way (FOX8)
- Most Outstanding on Camera Performance (male) – Dan Wyllie, Love My Way (FOX8)
- Most Outstanding on Camera Performance (female) – Claudia Karvan, Love My Way (Showtime)
- Most Outstanding Consumer Campaign (Subscription Sales) – Regional Campaign: Townsville (Movie Network)
- Most Outstanding Consumer Campaign (Subscriber Retention) – Super Safari Watch 'n Win (Disney Channel)
- Most Outstanding Creative Campaign – See What the Rest of the World Has to Offer (World Movies)
- Most Creative On-Air Program Promotion – Club V Dance Space (Club V)
- Most Creative Off-Air Promotion – Band in a Bubble (Channel [V])
- Rising Talent – Sam Clark
- Most Outstanding Contribution to Subscription Television – John Porter

== 2006 ==
- Channel of the Year – Sky News
- Favourite Program – Australia's Next Top Model (FOX8)
- Favourite International Program – High School Musical 2 (Disney Channel)
- Favourite International Personality or Actor – Paul Snr. and Paul Jnr. Teutul: American Chopper (Discovery Channel)
- Favourite International Actor – Denis Leary, Rescue Me (FOX8)
- Favourite Male Personality – James Mathison (Channel [V])
- Favourite Female Personality – Erika Heynatz (FOX8)
- Most Outstanding International Program (Drama) – Deadwood (Showtime)
- Most Outstanding International Program (Non Drama) – The Deadliest Catch: Dead of Winter (Discovery Channel)
- Most Outstanding Program Event – Antiques Roadshow (The LifeStyle Channel)
- Most Outstanding Short Form Program – Running on Empty (The Weather Channel)
- Most Outstanding Sports Program – Culture Count (FUEL TV)
- Most Outstanding Sports Coverage – Australian Open Tennis 2005: Live and Active (FOX Sports)
- Most Outstanding Documentary – He's Coming South: The Attack on Sydney Harbour (The History Channel)
- Most Outstanding News Program or Coverage – Schapelle Corby Verdict (Sky News)
- Most Outstanding Lifestyle, Reality or Light Entertainment Program – Antiques Roadshow Australia (The LifeStyle Channel)
- Most Outstanding Drama – Love My Way (FOX8)
- Most Outstanding Performance by an Actor (Male) Dan Wyllie, Love My Way FOX8)
- Most Outstanding Performance by an Actor (Female) – Claudia Karvan, Love My Way (Showtime)
- Most Outstanding Performance by a Presenter – David Speers (Sky News)
- Most Outstanding Performance by a Broadcast Journalist – Kieran Gilbert (Sky News)
- Most Outstanding Consumer Campaign (Subscription Sales) – AUSTAR Kids Campaign (AUSTAR)
- Most Outstanding Consumer Campaign (Subscriber Retention) – AUSTAR Multiroom Trial & Campaign (AUSTAR)
- Most Outstanding Use of Subscription TV Medium for a Consumer Advertising Campaign – Toyota Yaris Interactive Advertising Campaign, Toyota: The Media Store (Multi Channel Network)
- Most Creative On-Air Program Promotion – Australia's Next Top Model, Series 2 Campaign (FOX8)

== 2007 ==
- Channel of the Year – Nickelodeon
- Favourite Program – Australia's Next Top Model (FOX8)
- Favourite International Program – American Chopper
- Favourite International Personality or Actor – Paul Snr. and Paul Jnr. Teutul: American Chopper (Discovery Channel)
- Favourite Male Personality – Steve Irwin (Animal Planet)
- Favourite Female Personality – Antonia Kidman (W.)
- Most Outstanding International Program or Event – Rock Star: Supernova (FOX8)
- Most Outstanding Event – Nickelodeon Kids' Choice Awards 2006 (Nickelodeon)
- Most Outstanding Short Form Program – Kids First (Nickelodeon)
- Most Outstanding Children's Program – Gardening for Kids with Madi (Nick Jr.)
- Most Outstanding Music Program or Coverage – Wolfmother LIVE (MTV)
- Most Outstanding Sports Program – 2006 BMX Games (FUEL TV)
- Most Outstanding Sports Coverage – Commonwealth Games 2006 (FOX Sports)
- Most Outstanding Documentary – The Battle of Long Tan (The History Channel)
- Most Outstanding News Program or Coverage – A Week that Changed Australia: The Death of Steve Irwin and Peter Brock (Sky News)
- Most Outstanding Lifestyle, Reality or Light Entertainment Program – Australia's Next Top Model (FOX8)
- Most Outstanding Drama – Love My Way (W.) / Stupid Stupid Man (TV1)
- Most Outstanding Performance by an Actor (male) – Dan Wyllie, Love My Way (W.)
- Most Outstanding Performance by an Actor (Female) – Asher Keddie, Love My Way (W.)
- Most Outstanding Performance by a Presenter – David Speers (Sky News)
- Most Outstanding Consumer Campaign (Subscription Sales) – The Sci Fi Channel Launch (Sci Fi / AUSTAR / FOXTEL)
- Most Outstanding Consumer Campaign (Subscriber Retention) – Honeymoon Retention Campaign: Make the Most out of Your FOXTEL Digital (FOXTEL)
- Most Outstanding Use of Subscription TV Medium for a Consumer Advertising Campaign – Sony Dedicated Advertiser Location (Multi Channel Network / Starcom)
- Most Creative On-Air Program Promotion – Budgie Nation (MTV)
- Most Creative Off-Air Program Promotion – Rock Star: Supernova 'It's Gonna Be Big' Campaign (FOX8)
- Most Outstanding Program Promotion Campaign – Entourage (Arena)
- Most Outstanding Use of Technology – High School Music Dance Off (Disney Channel)

== 2008 ==
- Channel of the Year – FOX8
- Favourite Program – Australia's Next Top Model (FOX8)
- Favourite International Program – High School Musical 2 (Disney Channel)
- Favourite International Personality or Actor – Gordon Ramsay, Hell's Kitchen (LifeStyle FOOD)
- Favourite Male Personality – Jimmy Barnes (MAX)
- Favourite Female Personality – Antonia Kidman (W.)
- Most Outstanding International Program or Event – The Riches (Showcase)
- Most Outstanding Event – Nickelodeon Kids' Choice Awards 2007 (Nickelodeon)
- Most Outstanding Short Form Program – Snoop (MTV)
- Most Outstanding Children's Program – Camp Orange: The Mystery of Spaghetti Creek (Nickelodeon)
- Most Outstanding Music Program or Coverage – MAX Sessions: Powderfinger, Concert for the Cure (MAX)
- Most Outstanding Sports Program – On the Couch (FOX Sports 1)
- Most Outstanding Sports Coverage – Wallabies (FOX Sports 2)
- Most Outstanding Documentary – Thanks for Listening (The History Channel)
- Most Outstanding News Program or Coverage – APEC 2007 (Sky News)
- Most Outstanding Lifestyle Program – Stuart MacGill Uncorked (LifeStyle FOOD)
- Most Outstanding Light Entertainment Program – The Singing Office (FOX8)
- Most Outstanding Drama – The King (TV1)
- Most Outstanding Performance by an Actor (male) – Stephen Curry, The King (TV1)
- Most Outstanding Performance by an Actor (female) – Claudia Karvan, Love My Way (Showtime)
- Most Outstanding Performance by a Presenter – David Speers (Sky News)
- Most Outstanding Performance by a Broadcast Journalist – Kieran Gilbert (Sky News)
- Most Outstanding Marketing Campaign (Subscription Sales) – Unexpectedly Campaign (FOXTEL)
- Most Outstanding Consumer Campaign (Subscriber Retention) – The King (TV1)
- Most Outstanding Use of Subscription TV Medium for a Consumer Advertising Campaign – Hasbro Transformers Script Writing Competition (Cartoon Network)
- Most Creative On-Air Program Promotion – Bulpitt Day Australia Day (FOX Classics)
- Most Creative Off-Air Program Promotion – The Home of SpongeBob (Nickelodeon)
- Most Outstanding Program Promotion Campaign – The King (TV1)
- Most Outstanding Use of Technology – ClickHeadSpace (Nickelodeon)
- Most Outstanding Use of Interactive Television – Barclays Premier League: Viewers Choice (FOX Sports 1)

== 2009 ==
- Channel of the Year – Nick Jr.
- Favourite Program – Selling Houses Australia (The LifeStyle Channel)
- Favourite International Program – Grand Designs, Series 6 (The LifeStyle Channel)
- Favourite International Personality or Actor – Gordon Ramsay, Hell's Kitchen (The LifeStyle Channel)
- Favourite Male Personality – Merrick & Rosso (The Comedy Channel)
- Favourite Female Personality – Ruby Rose (MTV)
- Most Outstanding International Program or Event – Mad Men (Movie EXTRA)
- Most Outstanding Event – MTV Australia Awards 2008 (MTV)
- Most Outstanding Short Form Program – As The Bell Rings (Disney Channel)
- Most Outstanding Children's Program – Camp Orange: The Curse of the Emerald Eye (Nickelodeon)
- Most Outstanding Music Program or Coverage – MAX Masters: Coldplay (MAX)
- Most Outstanding Sports Program – An Aussie Goes Bolly (FOX8)
- Most Outstanding Sports Coverage – Bowl-a-Rama (Fuel TV)
- Most Outstanding Documentary – Beyond Kokoda (The History Channel)
- Most Outstanding News Program or Coverage – Global Financial Crisis (Sky News Business)
- Most Outstanding Lifestyle Program – Selling Houses Australia (The Lifestyle Channel)
- Most Outstanding Light Entertainment Program – Project Runway Australia (Arena TV)
- Most Outstanding Drama – Satisfaction (Showcase)
- Most Outstanding Performance by an Actor (male) – Wayne Hope, Stupid, Stupid Man (TV1)
- Most Outstanding Performance by an Actor (female) – Alison Whyte, Satisfaction (Showcase)
- Most Outstanding Performance by a Presenter – Brendon Julian, Inside Cricket (FOX Sports 1)
- Most Outstanding Performance by a Broadcast Journalist – David Speers (Sky News Australia)

== 2010 ==
- Channel of the Year – The LifeStyle Channel
- Best New Talent – Camille Keenan, Satisfaction Season 3 (Showcase)
- Most Outstanding Documentary – Forecast For Disaster: The Weather Behind Black Saturday (The Weather Channel)
- Most Outstanding Light Entertainment Program – Australia's Next Top Model (FOX8)
- Most Outstanding Performance by a Presenter – Andrew Winter, Selling Houses Australia (The LifeStyle Channel)
- Most Outstanding Use of Innovation in Programming - In The Womb: Extreme Animals (National Geographic Channel)
- Most Outstanding Performance by a Broadcast Journalist – Kieran Gilbert (Sky News)
- Most Outstanding Performance by an Actor (male) – Ben Mendelsohn, Tangle (Showcase)
- Most Outstanding Music Program or Coverage – Sound Relief (Channel [V] & MAX)
- Most Outstanding Lifestyle Program – Selling Houses Australia, Season 2 (The LifeStyle Channel)
- Most Outstanding Performance by an Actor (female) – Justine Clarke, Tangle (Showcase)
- Favourite Program – Selling Houses Australia, Season 2 (The Lifestyle Channel)
- Most Outstanding News Program or Coverage – The Weather Channel Black Saturday Coverage: 4–8 Feb 2009 (The Weather Channel)
- Most Outstanding Drama – False Witness (UKTV)
- Favourite Personality – Andrew Winter (The LifeStyle Channel)
- Most Outstanding Children's Program or Event – Camp Orange: The Final Frontier (Nickelodeon)
- Most Outstanding Sports Program or Coverage – Monday Night Football: 2009 NRL Season Round 21: Wests Tigers v Manly Warringah Sea Eagles (FOX Sports)
- Most Outstanding Marketing Campaign (Subscription Sales) – Good News Sale (FOXTEL)
- Most Outstanding Marketing Campaign (Subscriber Retention) – Andre Rieu: Classic Music Rocks AUSTAR subscribers (AUSTAR)
- Most Outstanding Use of Subscription TV Medium for a Consumer Advertising Campaign – Westfield with Trinny & Susannah (The LifeStyle Channel/XYZ Networks)
- Most Creative On-Air Program Promotion – Meth Epidemic (Crime & Investigation Network)
- Most Creative Off-Air Program Promotion – America's Hardest Prisons (National Geographic Channel)
- Most Outstanding Program Promotion Campaign – Hannah Montana & Miley Cyrus: Best of Both Worlds Concert 3D (Disney Channel)
- Most Outstanding Channel Image Spot – Everybody Loves The Sunshine Campaign (TV1)
- Most Outstanding Use of Technology – MySpace Mix Tape (Channel [V])
- Most Outstanding Use of Interactive Television – Sky Racing ACTIVE (Sky Racing)

== 2011 ==
- Channel of the Year – The LifeStyle Channel
- Favourite Program (Australian) – Selling Houses Australia (The LifeStyle Channel)
- Favourite Program (International) – Grand Designs (The LifeStyle Channel)
- Favourite Personality (Female) – Sarah Murdoch (FOX8)
- Favourite Personality (Male) – Andrew Winter (The LifeStyle Channel)
- Most Outstanding Children's Program or Event – Penelope K, by the way (CBeebies)
- Most Outstanding Music Program or Coverage – Big Day Out Li[V]e 2010 (Channel [V])
- Most Outstanding Sports Program or Coverage – Vancouver Olympic Winter Games (FOXTEL)
- Most Outstanding Documentary – Who We Are (Bio)
- Most Outstanding News Program or Coverage – Election 2010 (Sky News)
- Most Outstanding Reality Program – Australia's Next Top Model (FOX8)
- Most Outstanding Lifestyle Program – Grand Designs Australia (The LifeStyle Channel)
- Most Outstanding Light Entertainment Program – Nickelodeon Australian Kids' Choice Awards 2010 (Nickelodeon)
- Most Outstanding Drama – Spirited (W.)
- Most Outstanding Use of Innovation in Programming – Delhi Commonwealth Games 2010 (FOXTEL)
- Most Outstanding Performance by an Actor (Male) – Matt King (W.)
- Most Outstanding Performance by an Actor (Female) Catherine McClements (Showcase)
- Most Outstanding Performance by a Presenter – David Speers (Sky News)
- Most Outstanding Performance by a Broadcast Journalist – Ashleigh Gillon (Sky News)
- Best New Talent – Peter Maddison (The LifeStyle Channel)
- Most Outstanding Use of Technology – weatherchannel.com.au Relaunch, The Weather Channel

== 2012 ==
The 2012 ASTRA Awards were sponsored by Telstra, FOXTEL, AUSTAR, Napoleon Perdis, GHD and OpenTV.

=== Channel ===
– Channel of the Year – Fox Sports (Australia)

=== Subscriber's Choice ===
- Favourite Program (Australian) – Selling Houses Australia Extreme
- Favourite Program (International) – Grand Designs
- Favourite Program (International Drama) – Game of Thrones
- Favourite Personality (Male) – Andrew Winter
- Favourite Personality (Female) – Donna Hay

=== Programming and production ===
– Most Outstanding Children's Program or Event – The Amazing World of Gumball
– Most Outstanding Music Program or Coverage – Foo Fighters: Wasting Light on the Harbour
– Most Outstanding Sports Program or Coverage – KFC T20 Big Bash League
– Most Outstanding Documentary – Australia's Great Flood
– Most Outstanding News Program or Coverage – Gillard V Rudd
– Most Outstanding Reality Program – Kalgoorlie Cops
– Most Outstanding Lifestyle Program – Planet Cake
– Most Outstanding Light Entertainment Program – Balls of Steel Australia
– Most Outstanding Drama – Cloudstreet
– Most Outstanding Use of Innovation in Programming – FOX FIELD

=== Talent ===
– Most Outstanding Performance by an Actor (Male) – David Wenham
– Most Outstanding Performance by an Actor (Female) – Kerry Fox
– Most Outstanding Performance by a Presenter – Luke & Wyatt
– Most Outstanding Performance by a Broadcast Journalist – David Speers
– Best New Talent – Lara Robinson

== 2013 ==
The 2013 ceremony took place on 25 July 2013 with the following categories and winners:

=== Channel ===
- Channel of the Year – Fox Footy

=== Subscriber's Choice ===
- Favourite Personality (Female) – Shaynna Blaze [Selling Houses Australia] (The LifeStyle Channel)
- Favourite Personality (Male) – Andrew Winter [Selling Houses Australia] (The LifeStyle Channel)
- Favourite Program (Australian) – Selling Houses Australia series 5 (The LifeStyle Channel)
- Favourite Program (International) – Kevin's Grand Design (The LifeStyle Channel)
- Favourite Program (International Drama) – Game of Thrones season 2 (Showcase)

=== Programming and production ===
- Most Outstanding Children's Program or Event – Didi and B (Nick Jr.)
- Most Outstanding Documentary – Abalone Wars (Discovery Channel)
- Most Outstanding Drama – Tangle season 3 (Showcase)
- Most Outstanding Lifestyle Program – Tony Robinson's Time Walks (The History Channel)
- Most Outstanding Light Entertainment Program – The Riff (Channel [V])
- Most Outstanding Music Program or Coverage – Nickelodeon SLIMEFEST (Nickelodeon)
- Most Outstanding News Program or Coverage – Political coverage, PM Agenda (SKY NEWS)
- Most Outstanding Reality Program – Come Dine With Me Australia series 4 (The LifeStyle Channel)
- Most Outstanding Sports Program or Coverage – 2012 Toyota AFL Premiership Season and Finals Series (Fox Footy)
- Most Outstanding Use of Innovation in Programming – London 2012 Olympic Games (Foxtel)

=== Talent ===
- Best New Talent – Marty Smiley
- Most Outstanding Performance by an Actor (Female) – Catherine McClements [Tangle season 3] (Showcase)
- Most Outstanding Performance by an Actor (Male) – Lincoln Younes [Tangle season 3] (Showcase)
- Most Outstanding Performance by a Broadcast Journalist – Ahron Young [News coverage] (SKY NEWS)
- Most Outstanding Performance by a Presenter – Matt Shirvington [London 2012 Olympic Games] (Foxtel)

=== Lifetime Achievement Award ===
- Bill Collins

== 2014 ==
The 2014 ceremony took place on 20 March 2014 with the following categories and winners:

=== Channel ===
- Channel Achievement Award – HISTORY
- Channel of the Year – Showcase

=== Subscriber's Choice ===
- Favourite Personality (Female) – Shaynna Blaze [Selling Houses Australia] (The LifeStyle Channel)
- Favourite Personality (Male) – Andrew Winter [Selling Houses Australia] (The LifeStyle Channel)
- Favourite Program (Australian) – Selling Houses Australia (The LifeStyle Channel)
- Favourite Program (International) – Grand Designs UK (The LifeStyle Channel)
- Favourite Program (International Drama) – The Walking Dead (FX)

=== Programming and production ===
- Most Outstanding Children's Content – Disney Channel FanFest TV Special Event (Disney Channel)
- Most Outstanding Australian Drama – Wentworth (SoHo)
- Most Outstanding Factual Program – THE PEOPLE SPEAK (HISTORY)
- Most Outstanding General Entertainment Program – SLIMEFEST 2013 (Nickelodeon)
- Most Outstanding Lifestyle Program – Paddock to Plate (The LifeStyle Channel)
- Most Outstanding Music Program – The Riff (Channel [V])
- Most Outstanding News Program – Election 2013 (SKY NEWS National)
- Most Outstanding Reality Program – Australia's Next Top Model (FOX8)
- Most Outstanding Sports Program – The DHL Australia 2013 Lions Tour (FOX SPORTS)
- Most Outstanding Sports Entertainment Program – Open Mike (FOX FOOTY)
- Most Outstanding Use of Innovation – Rugby (FOX SPORTS)

=== Talent ===
- Most Outstanding New Talent – Kelli Underwood [Back Page LIVE, ANZ Championship] (FOX SPORTS)
- Most Outstanding Performance by an Actor (Female) – Nicole da Silva [Wentworth] (SoHo)
- Most Outstanding Performance by an Actor (Male) – Peter Mullan [Top of the Lake] (UKTV)
- Most Outstanding Performance by a Broadcast Journalist – David Speers [PM Agenda, The Nation, Election Coverage] (SKY NEWS National)

=== Honorary ASTRA Award ===
- “To honour an exceptional contribution to the Subscription Television Industry” – Charlotte Dawson

== 2015 ==
The 2015 ceremony took place on 12 March 2015 with the following categories and winners:

=== Channel ===
- Channel Achievement Award – Arena
- Channel of the Year – SKY NEWS

=== Programming and production ===
- Most Outstanding Children's Program – Monster Beach (Cartoon Network)
- Most Outstanding Drama (Australian) – Wentworth season 2 (SoHo)
- Most Outstanding Drama (International) – Game of Thrones season 4 (Showcase)
- Most Outstanding Factual Program – Hillsborough (ESPN)
- Most Outstanding General Entertainment Program – Top Gear (BBC Knowledge)
- Most Outstanding Lifestyle Program – Paddock to Plate season 2 (The LifeStyle Channel)
- Most Outstanding Music Program – SLIMEFEST (Nickelodeon)
- Most Outstanding News Program – Paul Murray LIVE (SKY NEWS)
- Most Outstanding Reality Program – The Recruit season 1 (FOX8)
- Most Outstanding Sports Program – Jeep Saturday LIVE on FOX (FOX FOOTY)

=== Talent ===
- Most Outstanding New Talent – Phyllis Foundis [Foundis] (Aurora)
- Most Outstanding Performance by an Actor (Female) – Danielle Cormack [Wentworth season 2] (SoHo)
- Most Outstanding Performance by an Actor (Male) – Andrew McFarlane [Devil's Playground] (Showcase)
- Most Outstanding Performance by a Broadcast Journalist – David Speers [PM Agenda, The Nation] (SKY NEWS)
- Most Outstanding Presenter (Female) – Kelli Underwood [Back Page LIVE, Breaking Ground] (FOX SPORTS)
- Most Outstanding Presenter (Male) – Paul Murray [Paul Murray LIVE] (SKY NEWS)

=== Industry Contribution Award ===
- Brian Walsh

== See also ==
- List of television awards
- Australian Subscription Television and Radio Association
