= Graham Ross (horticulturalist) =

Australian horticulturist, writer and presenter

- Born: October 1947 (age 79); Sydney, New South Wales, Australia
- Occupations: Horticulturist; author; radio personality; television presenter
- Known for: Better Homes and Gardens

Graham Ross AM (born October 1947) is an Australian horticulturalist, author, television presenter and radio presenter. In 2011 he was presented with London's Royal Horticultural Society's Veitch Memorial Medal (VMM) in recognition of his contribution to gardening and horticulture in Australia. The VMM is an international award issued annually by London's Royal Horticultural Society. Ross is only the fourth Australian to receive the VMM since its inception in 1870. He is the only Australian in history to have been appointed a Life Fellow of the prestigious Royal Botanic Gardens Kew Guild, London.

== Career ==
Ross's career began in Sydney during the late 1970s when he started presenting gardening segments and programs for ABC Television in 1978. He appeared on the Seven Network's 11AM in 1980 as well as on Seven National News as a horticultural reporter. He was gardening editor for The Daily Telegraph for four years and worked on The Sun for 10 years.

Originating as a weekly segment each Wednesday on Mickie de Stoop's afternoon program, Ross commenced presenting his own three-hour Sunday morning gardening program on radio station 2GB in 1980, which is now one of the longest running, and highest-rating programs in Australian radio history.

Ross has been with Australia's Channel Seven since the mid-1980s. Most of that time he has spent at Australia's number one lifestyle show, Better Homes and Gardens, on which he has presented over 900 episodes.

Ross was awarded the Veitch Memorial Medal of the Royal Horticultural Society in 2011. In 2014 he won the Australian Institute of Horticulture's Golden Wattle Award for the advancement of the profession of horticulture in Australia through 'sustained exemplary conduct as a professional horticulturist'.

Ross has received treatment for several skin cancers and prostate cancer and cites his experience with chemicals in the early days of his career as a motivating factor in his interest in organic gardening.

== Australian Garden Council ==
In November 2015 Ross was instrumental in the establishment of the Australian Garden Council with a focus on the promotion of gardening, garden education and garden tourism. According to Ross, it was motivated by his view that, "For too long gardeners and horticulturists, the essence of a multi-billion dollar domestic industry, have been ignored, taken for granted and undervalued in Australia business, government, educational and community circles". David Glenn, Tim Entwisle from the Melbourne Royal Botanic Gardens and gardening writer Trevor Nottle were also named as members of the founding council. Ross described the goal of the new council as being to "reinstate gardening on to the national agenda".

In September 2016 an article in the Brisbane Courier Mail revealed that the Australian Garden Council had given its backing to a project called Australis, an extended gardening festival proposed to be held in 2020. Ross was quoted as saying "the AGC strongly supported Australis" which has elsewhere been described by one of the key protagonists as a "a catalyst for future urban developments" In a reference to the ongoing contest around where the event was to be held and the role of property development in the proposal, the Gold Coast Mayor Tom Tate said he was "unwilling to give away public land for this proposal". By 2019 it was apparent that the bid to establish the event had failed.

In the lead up to the 2019 federal election it was announced that the Australian Garden Council was to be awarded $490,000 to fund a "four year program to promote horticulture skills and careers".
