= Wendy Moore (television personality) =

Australian television presenter

- Occupations: Interior designer; television host and judge; former magazine editor; TV executive
- Known for: Selling Houses Australia; House Rules

Wendy Moore is an Australian interior designer and television personality.

She appeared as co-host and interior designer on Foxtel's Selling Houses Australia (2022-present) and previously as a judge on the Seven Network's home renovation series House Rules (2013–2019); she previously served as the editor-in-chief at Home Beautiful magazine.

In April 2019, she was appointed general manager of Foxtel's Lifestyle group of channels, overseeing streaming, broadcast and digital programming and international acquisitions; she left the role at the end of 2025.
