= Selling Houses Australia =

Television series

- Presented by: Andrew Winter
- Starring: Charlie Albone (2008–20); Shaynna Blaze (2008–20); Dennis Scott (2022–); Wendy Moore (2022–)
- Country of origin: Australia
- No. of series: 18
- No. of episodes: 202 + 5 specials (list of episodes)

Production
- Producers: Beyond Productions (2008–20); Warner Bros. International Television Production (2022–)
- Running time: 60 mins (including ads)

Original release
- Network: LifeStyle
- Release: 19 March 2008 – present

Related
- Selling Houses UK; Love It or List It Australia

Selling Houses Australia is an Australian reality and lifestyle TV series, based on the British show Selling Houses. The series follows property owners who are having difficulty selling their home. The show is hosted by property expert and author Andrew Winter, who also presented the British version. He is joined by landscaper Dennis Scott and interiors expert Wendy Moore of The Interiors Edit (replacing Charlie Albone and Shaynna Blaze from season 14 onwards). The series is produced exclusively for Foxtel by WBITVP.

== Format ==
Andrew meets with the property owner at their home and reviews the house before eventually bringing in his team to assess the property. Then the owners will hear feedback from both the team and general public before a budget is provided. The team (usually with the help of the homeowners) then renovate the property to boost the appeal and saleability. Andrew then returns to the property and the final renovation results are shown with new public feedback. The property is then put up for sale (either private or auction) and the selling result is shown at the end of each episode.

== Awards ==
In 2009 and 2010, the show won ASTRA Awards for Most Outstanding Lifestyle Program and Viewers' Favourite Program. In 2013, the show won Most Outstanding Lifestyle Program, and in 2014, was named Favourite Program – Australian. In 2013, Selling Houses Australia was the highest rating LifeStyle Channel series and was the number 1 regular program on Pay TV. In its seventh series, which aired in 2014, the show became the highest rating series in Foxtel history, reaching a cumulative average of 603,000 viewers per episode, and "2.6 million unique people, equivalent to 37% of all Foxtel subscribers" across the series.

== History ==
In May 2014, it was announced that a five-episode special, Inside Selling Houses Australia, would begin airing on 25 June. The series sees Winter, Albone and Blaze "swap war stories from their seven years together doing property makeovers." The final episode aired in January 2015.

The free-to-air Seven Network picked up the rights to the series and began airing the series from its fifth season on 25 August 2016. The twelfth season premiered on 6 March 2019, and the series will become "the most successful locally produced series" in Australian subscription television history.

In February 2020, Charlie Albone announced he would be leaving the series and would be joining Seven Network's Better Homes and Gardens from 2020; a casting call was announced for a new landscaper for the series. In March 2021, Shaynna Blaze announced she would also be leaving the series due to a busy schedule. In May 2021, former House Rules judge and interior designer Wendy Moore and former NRL player turned landscape designer Dennis Scott were announced to be joining the series from its 14th season which began airing from 30 March 2022. The fifteenth season premiered on 22 March 2023. The sixteenth season of the series premiered on 20 March 2024. The seventeenth season of the series premiered on 5 March 2025. In September 2025, the series was renewed for an eighteenth season along a six part special, Inside Selling Houses Australia: New Beginnings. The eighteenth season will premiere on 4 March 2026, which will include its 200th episode.

== Cast ==
=== Current ===
- Andrew Winter – presenter and professional real estate agent (2008–)
- Dennis Scott – exterior and garden designer (2022–)
- Wendy Moore – interior designer (2022–)

=== Former ===
- Charlie Albone – exterior and garden designer (2008–2020)
- Shaynna Blaze – interior designer (2008–2020)

== Series overview ==
Season	No. of episodes	Timeslot	Originally aired		Viewership			
Season	No. of episodes	Timeslot	Series premiere	Series finale	Avg. viewers (thousands)	Most watched episode	Viewers (thousands)	Rank
1	10	Wednesday 7:30pm–8:30pm	19 March 2008	21 May 2008	—N/a			
2	10	Wednesday 7:30pm–8:30pm	25 March 2009	27 May 2009	—N/a			
3	10	Wednesday 7:30pm–8:30pm	3 April 2010	2 June 2010	—N/a			
4	10	Wednesday 7:30pm–8:30pm	14 February 2011	20 April 2011	—N/a			
5	10	Wednesday 7:30pm–8:30pm	1 February 2012	4 April 2012	145,000	"Fixer Upper"	177,000	#1
6	10	Wednesday 7:30pm–8:30pm	6 February 2013	10 April 2013	150,000	"Huonbrook, NSW"	208,000	#1
7	13	Wednesday 7:30pm–8:30pm	5 February 2014	30 April 2014	149,000	"Greenwich, NSW"	206,000	#1
8	13	Wednesday 8:30pm–9:30pm	4 February 2015	29 April 2015	160,000	"Kelmscott, WA"	193,000	#1
9	13	Wednesday 8:30pm–9:30pm	3 February 2016	27 April 2016	138,000	"Ballarat, VIC"	168,000	#1
10	13	Wednesday 8:30pm–9:30pm	1 March 2017	24 May 2017	130,000	"Wangi Wangi, NSW"	143,000	#1
11	13	Wednesday 8:30pm–9:30pm	7 March 2018	30 May 2018	145,000	"Bendigo, VIC"	177,000	#1
12	13	Wednesday 8:30pm–9:30pm	6 March 2019	29 May 2019	129,000	"Gold Coast Houseboat, QLD"	179,000	#2
13	10	Wednesday 8:30pm–9:30pm	25 March 2020	27 May 2020	149,000	"Crows Nest, NSW"	183,000	#2
14	10	Wednesday 8:30pm–9:30pm	30 March 2022	1 June 2022	88,000	"Bridport, TAS"	105,000	#1
15	10	Wednesday 8:30pm–9:30pm	22 March 2023	24 May 2023	71,000	"Greystanes, NSW"	94,000	#2
16	10	Wednesday 8:30pm–9:30pm	20 March 2024	22 May 2024	—N/a			
17	12	Wednesday 8:30pm–9:30pm	5 March 2025	21 May 2025	—N/a			
18	12	Wednesday 8:30pm–9:30pm	4 March 2026	20 May 2026	—N/a			
Specials	5	Wednesday; 8:30 pm–9:30 pm (Eps 1–3); Thursday; 8:30 pm–9:30 pm (Eps 4–5)	25 June 2014	15 January 2015	91,000	"Reject Row"	132,000	#1

== Seasons ==
=== Season 1 (2008) ===
No. overall	No. in Season	Title	Original airdate	Timeslot
1	1	"Austinmer, NSW"	19 March 2008	Wednesday 7:30pm–8:30pm
2	2	"Bilgola Plateau, NSW"	26 March 2008	Wednesday 7:30pm–8:30pm
3	3	"Mount Martha, VIC"	2 April 2008	Wednesday 7:30pm–8:30pm
4	4	"South Granville, NSW"	9 April 2008	Wednesday 7:30pm–8:30pm
5	5	"Gold Coast, QLD"	16 April 2008	Wednesday 7:30pm–8:30pm
6	6	"Collingwood Park, QLD"	23 April 2008	Wednesday 7:30pm–8:30pm
7	7	"Botany, NSW"	30 April 2008	Wednesday 7:30pm–8:30pm
8	8	"Runaway Bay, QLD"	7 May 2008	Wednesday 7:30pm–8:30pm
9	9	"Coogee, NSW"	14 May 2008	Wednesday 7:30pm–8:30pm
10	10	"Dingley Village, VIC"	21 May 2008	Wednesday 7:30pm–8:30pm

=== Season 2 (2009) ===
No. overall	No. in Season	Title	Original airdate	Timeslot
11	1	"Gowrie, ACT"	25 March 2009	Wednesday 7:30pm–8:30pm
12	2	"Walkerville, SA"	1 April 2009	Wednesday 7:30pm–8:30pm
13	3	"North Ryde, NSW"	8 April 2009	Wednesday 7:30pm–8:30pm
14	4	"Kurrajong Heights, NSW"	15 April 2009	Wednesday 7:30pm–8:30pm
15	5	"Portalington, VIC"	22 April 2009	Wednesday 7:30pm–8:30pm
16	6	"Marrickville, NSW"	29 April 2009	Wednesday 7:30pm–8:30pm
17	7	"Glen Iris, VIC"	6 May 2009	Wednesday 7:30pm–8:30pm
18	8	"Pymble, NSW"	13 May 2009	Wednesday 7:30pm–8:30pm
19	9	"San Remo, VIC"	20 May 2009	Wednesday 7:30pm–8:30pm
20	10	"Greystanes, NSW"	27 May 2009	Wednesday 7:30pm–8:30pm

=== Season 3 (2010) ===
No. overall	No. in Season	Title	Original airdate	Timeslot
21	1	"Chatswood, NSW"	3 April 2010	Wednesday 7:30pm–8:30pm
22	2	"Newcastle, NSW"	10 April 2010	Wednesday 7:30pm–8:30pm
23	3	"Kallangur, QLD"	14 April 2010	Wednesday 7:30pm–8:30pm
24	4	"Maroubra, NSW"	21 April 2010	Wednesday 7:30pm–8:30pm
25	5	"West Footscray, VIC"	28 April 2010	Wednesday 7:30pm–8:30pm
26	6	"Bundeena, NSW"	5 May 2010	Wednesday 7:30pm–8:30pm
27	7	"Castle Hill, NSW"	12 May 2010	Wednesday 7:30pm–8:30pm
28	8	"Pacific Pines, QLD"	19 May 2010	Wednesday 7:30pm–8:30pm
29	9	"Mitcham, VIC"	26 May 2010	Wednesday 7:30pm–8:30pm
30	10	"Croydon Park, NSW"	2 June 2010	Wednesday 7:30pm–8:30pm

=== Season 4 (2011) ===
No. overall	No. in Season	Title	Original airdate	Timeslot
31	1	"North Rocks, NSW"	14 February 2011	Wednesday 7:30pm–8:30pm
32	2	"Blue Mountains, NSW"	23 February 2011	Wednesday 7:30pm–8:30pm
33	3	"Oxley Park, NSW"	3 March 2011	Wednesday 7:30pm–8:30pm
34	4	"Calliope, QLD"	9 March 2011	Wednesday 7:30pm–8:30pm
35	5	"Port Douglas, QLD"	16 March 2011	Wednesday 7:30pm–8:30pm
36	6	"Frankston, VIC"	23 March 2011	Wednesday 7:30pm–8:30pm
37	7	"Balmain, NSW"	30 March 2011	Wednesday 7:30pm–8:30pm
38	8	"Extreme: Beachmere, QLD"	6 April 2011	Wednesday 7:30pm–8:30pm
39	9	"Extreme: Berowra Waters, NSW"	13 April 2011	Wednesday 7:30pm–8:30pm
40	10	"Extreme: Kurnell, NSW"	20 April 2011	Wednesday 7:30pm–8:30pm

=== Season 5 (2012) ===
No. overall	No. in Season	Title	Original airdate	Timeslot	Viewers (Thousands)	Nightly rank
41	1	"Flood House"	1 February 2012	Wednesday 7:30pm–8:30pm	152,000	#1
42	2	"Railway Cottage"	8 February 2012	Wednesday 7:30pm–8:30pm	157,000	#1
43	3	"80's Outback"	15 February 2012	Wednesday 7:30pm–8:30pm	140,000	#1
44	4	"Divorce House"	22 February 2012	Wednesday 7:30pm–8:30pm	130,000	#1
45	5	"Hoarder House"	29 February 2012	Wednesday 7:30pm–8:30pm	108,000	#2
46	6	"Developer Dreams"	7 March 2012	Wednesday 7:30pm–8:30pm	157,000	#1
47	7	"DIY Disaster"	14 March 2012	Wednesday 7:30pm–8:30pm	137,000	#1
48	8	"Inherited Queenslander"	21 March 2012	Wednesday 7:30pm–8:30pm	123,000	#1
49	9	"Inner City Terrace"	28 March 2012	Wednesday 7:30pm–8:30pm	170,000	#1
50	10	"Fixer Upper"	4 April 2012	Wednesday 7:30pm–8:30pm	177,000	#1
Season Average – 145,000

=== Season 6 (2013) ===
No. overall	No. in Season	Title	Original airdate	Timeslot	Viewers (Thousands)	Nightly rank
51	1	"Frankston, VIC"	6 February 2013	Wednesday 7:30pm–8:30pm	162,000	#1
52	2	"Wollongong, NSW"	13 February 2013	Wednesday 7:30pm–8:30pm	—N/a	
53	3	"Kings Langley, NSW"	20 February 2013	Wednesday 7:30pm–8:30pm	151,000	#1
54	4	"Erskineville, NSW"	27 February 2013	Wednesday 7:30pm–8:30pm	160,000	#1
55	5	"Glendenning, NSW"	6 March 2013	Wednesday 7:30pm–8:30pm	134,000	#1
56	6	"Huonbrook, NSW"	13 March 2013	Wednesday 7:30pm–8:30pm	208,000	#1
57	7	"Romsey, VIC"	20 March 2013	Wednesday 7:30pm–8:30pm	134,000	#1
58	8	"Darwin, NT"	27 March 2013	Wednesday 7:30pm–8:30pm	171,000	#1
59	9	"Gerringong, NSW"	3 April 2013	Wednesday 7:30pm–8:30pm	200,000	#1
60	10	"West Ryde, NSW"	10 April 2013	Wednesday 7:30pm–8:30pm	179,000	#1
Season Average – 150,000

=== Season 7 (2014) ===
No. overall	No. in Season	Title	Original airdate	Timeslot	Viewers (Thousands)	Nightly rank
61	1	"Molendinar, QLD"	5 February 2014	Wednesday 7:30pm–8:30pm	100,000	#1
62	2	"Kenthurst, NSW"	12 February 2014	Wednesday 7:30pm–8:30pm	117,000	#3
63	3	"Kedron, QLD"	19 February 2014	Wednesday 7:30pm–8:30pm	175,000	#1
64	4	"Hurlstone Park, NSW"	26 February 2014	Wednesday 7:30pm–8:30pm	101,000	#1
65	5	"Gladstone Park, VIC"	5 March 2014	Wednesday 7:30pm–8:30pm	138,000	#4
66	6	"Mudgee, NSW"	12 March 2014	Wednesday 7:30pm–8:30pm	149,000	#1
67	7	"Hamersley, WA"	19 March 2014	Wednesday 7:30pm–8:30pm	146,000	#1
68	8	"Drummoyne, NSW"	26 March 2014	Wednesday 7:30pm–8:30pm	163,000	#1
69	9	"Selby, VIC"	2 April 2014	Wednesday 7:30pm–8:30pm	124,000	#1
70	10	"Grays Point, NSW"	9 April 2014	Wednesday 7:30pm–8:30pm	142,000	#1
71	11	"Monterey, NSW"	16 April 2014	Wednesday 7:30pm–8:30pm	190,000	#1
72	12	"Greenwich, NSW"	23 April 2014	Wednesday 7:30pm–8:30pm	206,000	#1
73	13	"Alexandra Pub, VIC"	30 April 2014	Wednesday 7:30pm–8:30pm	183,000	#1
Season Average – 149,000

=== Season 8 (2015) ===
No. overall	No. in Season	Title	Original airdate	Timeslot	Viewers (Thousands)	Nightly rank
74	1	"Dapto, NSW"	4 February 2015	Wednesday 8:30pm–9:30pm	170,000	#1
75	2	"Kongwak, VIC"	11 February 2015	Wednesday 8:30pm–9:30pm	152,000	#1
76	3	"Haberfield, NSW"	18 February 2015	Wednesday 8:30pm–9:30pm	167,000	#1
77	4	"St Marys, NSW"	25 February 2015	Wednesday 8:30pm–9:30pm	170,000	#1
78	5	"Macleay Island, QLD"	4 March 2015	Wednesday 8:30pm–9:30pm	112,000	#4
79	6	"Reservoir, VIC"	11 March 2015	Wednesday 8:30pm–9:30pm	158,000	#1
80	7	"Mile End, SA"	18 March 2015	Wednesday 8:30pm–9:30pm	163,000	#1
81	8	"Wellington, NSW"	25 March 2015	Wednesday 8:30pm–9:30pm	151,000	#1
82	9	"Bateau Bay, NSW"	1 April 2015	Wednesday 8:30pm–9:30pm	182,000	#1
83	10	"Kelmscott, WA"	8 April 2015	Wednesday 8:30pm–9:30pm	193,000	#1
84	11	"Brookvale, NSW"	15 April 2015	Wednesday 8:30pm–9:30pm	175,000	#1
85	12	"Ashgrove, QLD"	22 April 2015	Wednesday 8:30pm–9:30pm	161,000	#1
86	13	"Batehaven, NSW"	29 April 2015	Wednesday 8:30pm–9:30pm	136,000	#1
Season Average – 160,000

=== Season 9 (2016) ===
No. overall	No. in Season	Title	Original airdate	Timeslot	Viewers (Thousands)	Nightly rank
87	1	"Ballarat, VIC"	3 February 2016	Wednesday 8:30pm – 9:30pm	168,000	#1
88	2	"Forest Lake, QLD"	10 February 2016	Wednesday 8:30pm – 9:30pm	120,000	#1
89	3	"Yallingup, WA"	17 February 2016	Wednesday 8:30pm – 9:30pm	126,000	#1
90	4	"Mudgeeraba, QLD"	24 February 2016	Wednesday 8:30pm – 9:30pm	133,000	#1
91	5	"Stroud, NSW"	2 March 2016	Wednesday 8:30pm – 9:30pm	140,000	#1
92	6	"Baulkham Hills, NSW"	9 March 2016	Wednesday 8:30pm – 9:30pm	124,000	#1
93	7	"Leongatha, VIC"	16 March 2016	Wednesday 8:30pm – 9:30pm	132,000	#1
94	8	"Ascot Vale, VIC"	23 March 2016	Wednesday 8:30pm – 9:30pm	97,000	#1
95	9	"North Haven, SA"	30 March 2016	Wednesday 8:30pm – 9:30pm	153,000	#1
96	10	"Bayswater, VIC"	6 April 2016	Wednesday 8:30pm – 9:30pm	148,000	#2
97	11	"Maitland, NSW"	13 April 2016	Wednesday 8:30pm – 9:30pm	133,000	#2
98	12	"Yass, NSW (Part 1)"	20 April 2016	Wednesday 8:30pm – 9:30pm	156,000	#2
99	13	"Yass, NSW (Part 2)"	27 April 2016	Wednesday 8:30pm – 9:30pm	166,000	#2
Season Average – 138,000

=== Season 10 (2017) ===
No. overall	No. in Season	Title	Original airdate	Timeslot	Viewers (Thousands)	Nightly rank
100	1	"Petersham, NSW"	1 March 2017	Wednesday 8:30pm – 9:30pm	134,000	#2
101	2	"Miami, QLD"	8 March 2017	Wednesday 8:30pm – 9:30pm	131,000	#2
102	3	"Bass, VIC"	15 March 2017	Wednesday 8:30pm – 9:30pm	131,000	#2
103	4	"Fulham, SA"	22 March 2017	Wednesday 8:30pm – 9:30pm	119,000	#2
104	5	"Ravenshoe, QLD"	29 March 2017	Wednesday 8:30pm – 9:30pm	136,000	#2
105	6	"Mt Macedon, VIC"	5 April 2017	Wednesday 8:30pm – 9:30pm	134,000	#2
106	7	"Wangi Wangi, NSW"	12 April 2017	Wednesday 8:30pm – 9:30pm	143,000	#1
107	8	"New Norfolk, "TAS"	19 April 2017	Wednesday 8:30pm – 9:30pm	139,000	#1
108	9	"Cobbitty, NSW"	26 April 2017	Wednesday 8:30pm – 9:30pm	120,000	#1
109	10	"Oxenford, QLD"	3 May 2017	Wednesday 8:30pm – 9:30pm	131,000	#1
110	11	"Hindmarsh Island, SA"	10 May 2017	Wednesday 8:30pm – 9:30pm	126,000	#1
111	12	"Casula, NSW"	17 May 2017	Wednesday 8:30pm – 9:30pm	108,000	#1
112	13	"Middle Ridge, QLD"	24 May 2017	Wednesday 8:30pm – 9:30pm	138,000	#1
Season Average – 130,000

=== Season 11 (2018) ===
No. overall	No. in Season	Title	Original airdate	Timeslot	Viewers (Thousands)	Nightly rank
113	1	"Black Hill, SA"	7 March 2018	Wednesday 8:30pm – 9:30pm	131,000	#1
114	2	"Nth Maclean, QLD"	14 March 2018	Wednesday 8:30pm – 9:30pm	128,000	#2
115	3	"Penrith, NSW"	21 March 2018	Wednesday 8:30pm – 9:30pm	138,000	#2
116	4	"Campwin Beach, QLD"	28 March 2018	Wednesday 8:30pm – 9:30pm	148,000	#2
117	5	"Guildford, NSW"	4 April 2018	Wednesday 8:30pm – 9:30pm	131,000	#2
118	6	"Stafford, QLD"	11 April 2018	Wednesday 8:30pm – 9:30pm	95,000	#2
119	7	"Victoria Park, WA"	18 April 2018	Wednesday 8:30pm – 9:30pm	152,000	#1
120	8	"Traralgon, VIC"	25 April 2018	Wednesday 8:30pm – 9:30pm	147,000	#5
121	9	"Balgownie, NSW"	4 May 2018	Wednesday 8:30pm – 9:30pm	149,000	#1
122	10	"Bendigo, VIC"	9 May 2018	Wednesday 8:30pm – 9:30pm	177,000	#1
123	11	"Tahmoor, NSW"	16 May 2018	Wednesday 8:30pm – 9:30pm	147,000	#1
124	12	"Silverdale, NSW"	23 May 2018	Wednesday 8:30pm – 9:30pm	170,000	#1
125	13	"Little Forest, NSW"	30 May 2018	Wednesday 8:30pm – 9:30pm	173,000	#1
Season Average – 145,000

=== Season 12 (2019) ===
No. overall	No. in Season	Title	Original airdate	Timeslot	Viewers (Thousands)	Nightly rank
126	1	"Normanhurst, NSW"	6 March 2019	Wednesday 8:30pm – 9:30pm	114,000	#2
127	2	"Lewiston, SA"	13 March 2019	Wednesday 8:30pm – 9:30pm	117,000	#4
128	3	"Balmain, NSW"	20 March 2019	Wednesday 8:30pm – 9:30pm	104,000	#2
129	4	"Inverloch, VIC"	27 March 2019	Wednesday 8:30pm – 9:30pm	110,000	#2
130	5	"Gold Coast Houseboat, QLD"	3 April 2019	Wednesday 8:30pm – 9:30pm	179,000	#2
131	6	"Euroa, VIC"	10 April 2019	Wednesday 8:30pm – 9:30pm	155,000	#2
132	7	"Jamboree Heights, QLD"	17 April 2019	Wednesday 8:30pm – 9:30pm	165,000	#2
133	8	"Pymble, NSW"	24 April 2019	Wednesday 8:30pm – 9:30pm	108,000	#2
134	9	"Mulgrave, VIC"	1 May 2019	Wednesday 8:30pm – 9:30pm	118,000	#1
135	10	"Mt Isa, QLD"	8 May 2019	Wednesday 8:30pm – 9:30pm	142,000	#1
136	11	"Queanbeyan, NSW"	15 May 2019	Wednesday 8:30pm – 9:30pm	127,000	#1
137	12	"Bensville, NSW"	22 May 2019	Wednesday 8:30pm – 9:30pm	112,000	#1
138	13	"Dolphin Point, NSW"	29 May 2019	Wednesday 8:30pm – 9:30pm	133,000	#1
Season Average – 129,000

=== Season 13 (2020) ===
No. overall	No. in Season	Title	Original airdate	Timeslot	Viewers (Thousands)	Nightly rank
139	1	"Waratah, NSW"	25 March 2020	Wednesday 8:30pm – 9:30pm	142,000	#2
140	2	"Turners Marsh, TAS"	1 April 2020	Wednesday 8:30pm – 9:30pm	177,000	#2
141	3	"Crows Nest, NSW"	8 April 2020	Wednesday 8:30pm – 9:30pm	183,000	#2
142	4	"Drysdale, VIC"	15 April 2020	Wednesday 8:30pm – 9:30pm	182,000	#2
143	5	"Parkerville, WA"	22 April 2020	Wednesday 8:30pm – 9:30pm	144,000	#2
144	6	"Hotel Kaniva, VIC"	29 April 2020	Wednesday 8:30pm – 9:30pm	140,000	#2
145	7	"Glenelg, SA"	6 May 2020	Wednesday 8:30pm – 9:30pm	140,000	#1
146	8	"Deception Bay, QLD"	13 May 2020	Wednesday 8:30pm – 9:30pm	150,000	#1
147	9	"Empire Bay, NSW"	20 May 2020	Wednesday 8:30pm – 9:30pm	127,000	#1
148	10	"The Gap, QLD"	27 May 2020	Wednesday 8:30pm – 9:30pm	110,000	#1
Season Average – 149,000

=== Season 14 (2022) ===
No. overall	No. in Season	Title	Original airdate	Timeslot	Outcome		Viewers (Thousands)	Nightly rank
No. overall	No. in Season	Title	Original airdate	Timeslot	House Sold?	Selling Price	Viewers (Thousands)	Nightly rank
149	1	"Mount Gambier, SA"	30 March 2022	Wednesday 8:30pm – 9:30pm	✓	$800k	61,000	#4
150	2	"Jindabyne, NSW"	6 April 2022	Wednesday 8:30pm – 9:30pm	✓	$1.3m	105,000	#2
151	3	"Belrose, NSW"	13 April 2022	Wednesday 8:30pm – 9:30pm	✓	$1.823m	92,000	#2
152	4	"Denistone, NSW"	20 April 2022	Wednesday 8:30pm – 9:30pm	✓	$2.1m	79,000	#4
153	5	"Penola, SA"	27 April 2022	Wednesday 8:30pm – 9:30pm	✓	$360k	82,000	#2
154	6	"Lindfield, NSW"	4 May 2022	Wednesday 8:30pm – 9:30pm	✓	$2.54m	99,000	#2
155	7	"Urunga, NSW"	11 May 2022	Wednesday 8:30pm – 9:30pm	✓	$990k	90,000	#1
156	8	"Chifley, NSW"	18 May 2022	Wednesday 8:30pm – 9:30pm	✓	$1.82m	80,000	#2
157	9	"Rosebrook, NSW"	25 May 2022	Wednesday 8:30pm – 9:30pm	✓	$1.64m	86,000	#1
158	10	"Bridport, TAS"	1 June 2022	Wednesday 8:30pm – 9:30pm	X	—N/a	105,000	#1
Season Average – 88,000

=== Season 15 (2023) ===
No. overall	No. in Season	Title	Original airdate	Timeslot	Outcome		Viewers (Thousands)	Nightly rank
No. overall	No. in Season	Title	Original airdate	Timeslot	House Sold?	Selling Price	Viewers (Thousands)	Nightly rank
159	1	"Clermont, QLD"	22 March 2023	Wednesday 8:30pm – 9:30pm	✓	$225k	64,000	#4
160	2	"Greystanes, NSW"	29 March 2023	Wednesday 8:30pm – 9:30pm	✓	$925k	94,000	#2
161	3	"Redland Bay, QLD"	5 April 2023	Wednesday 8:30pm – 9:30pm	✓	$875k	75,000	#2
162	4	"Sunshine West, VIC"	12 April 2023	Wednesday 8:30pm – 9:30pm	✓	$608k	53,000	#2
163	5	"Elanora, QLD"	19 April 2023	Wednesday 8:30pm – 9:30pm	X	—N/a	68,000	#2
164	6	"Maroubra, NSW"	26 April 2023	Wednesday 8:30pm – 9:30pm	X	—N/a	63,000	#2
165	7	"Ipswich, QLD"	3 May 2023	Wednesday 8:30pm – 9:30pm	✓	$735k	62,000	#2
166	8	"Como, NSW"	10 May 2023	Wednesday 8:30pm – 9:30pm	X	—N/a	71,000	#1
167	9	"Terrigal, NSW"	17 May 2023	Wednesday 8:30pm – 9:30pm	✓	$1.35m	84,000	#1
168	10	"Roselands, NSW"	24 May 2023	Wednesday 8:30pm – 9:30pm	✓	$1.35m	78,000	#1
Season Average – 71,000

=== Season 16 (2024) ===
No. overall	No. in Season	Title	Original airdate	Timeslot	Outcome	
No. overall	No. in Season	Title	Original airdate	Timeslot	House Sold?	Selling Price
169	1	"Ellalong, NSW"	20 March 2024	Wednesday 8:30pm – 9:30pm	✓	$760k
170	2	"Safety Beach, VIC"	27 March 2024	Wednesday 8:30pm – 9:30pm	✓	$1.55m
171	3	"Windsor Downs, NSW"	3 April 2024	Wednesday 8:30pm – 9:30pm	✓	$2.30m
172	4	"Tumby Bay, SA"	10 April 2024	Wednesday 8:30pm – 9:30pm	✓	$30k
173	5	"Turramurra, NSW"	17 April 2024	Wednesday 8:30pm – 9:30pm	✓	$2.73m
174	6	"Mermaid Waters, QLD"	24 April 2024	Wednesday 8:30pm – 9:30pm	✓	$1.65m
175	7	"Jannali, NSW"	1 May 2024	Wednesday 8:30pm – 9:30pm	X	—N/a
176	8	"Mudjimba, QLD"	8 May 2024	Wednesday 8:30pm – 9:30pm	✓	$1.1m
177	9	"West Brunswick, VIC"	15 May 2024	Wednesday 8:30pm – 9:30pm	✓	$1.14m
178	10	"Chipping Norton, NSW"	22 May 2024	Wednesday 8:30pm – 9:30pm	✓	$1.22m

=== Season 17 (2025) ===
No. overall	No. in Season	Title	Original airdate	Timeslot	Outcome	
No. overall	No. in Season	Title	Original airdate	Timeslot	House Sold?	Selling Price
179	1	"Hastings, VIC"	5 March 2025	Wednesday 8:30pm – 9:30pm	✓	$760k
180	2	"Engadine, NSW"	12 March 2025	Wednesday 8:30pm – 9:30pm	✓	$1.455m
181	3	"Hobartsville, NSW"	19 March 2025	Wednesday 8:30pm – 9:30pm	✓	$981.5k
182	4	"Westleigh, NSW"	26 March 2025	Wednesday 8:30pm – 9:30pm	X	—N/a
183	5	"Hornsby Heights, NSW"	2 April 2025	Wednesday 8:30pm – 9:30pm	✓	$1.53m
184	6	"Annandale, NSW"	9 April 2025	Wednesday 8:30pm – 9:30pm	X	—N/a
185	7	"Tallebudgera, QLD"	16 April 2025	Wednesday 8:30pm – 9:30pm	✓	$1.45m
186	8	"Castle Hill, NSW"	23 April 2025	Wednesday 8:30pm – 9:30pm	✓	$2.5m
187	9	"Camden, NSW"	30 April 2025	Wednesday 8:30pm – 9:30pm	✓	$1.85m
188	10	"West Ballina, NSW"	7 May 2025	Wednesday 8:30pm – 9:30pm	✓	$1.234m
189	11	"Harrington Park, NSW"	14 May 2025	Wednesday 8:30pm – 9:30pm	X	—N/a
190	12	"Alice Springs, NT"	21 May 2025	Wednesday 8:30pm – 9:30pm	✓	$600k

=== Season 18 (2026) ===
No. overall	No. in Season	Title	Original airdate	Timeslot	Outcome		
No. overall	No. in Season	Title	Original airdate	Timeslot	Reno Budget	House Sold?	Selling Price
191	1	"Rostrevor, SA"	4 March 2026	Wednesday 8:30pm – 9:30pm	$100k	✓	$1.26m
192	2	"Carina Heights, QLD"	11 March 2026	Wednesday 8:30pm – 9:30pm	$50k	✓	$1.28m
193	3	"Edmondson Park, NSW"	18 March 2026	Wednesday 8:30pm – 9:30pm	$30k	✓	$1.7m
194	4	"Loftus, NSW"	25 March 2026	Wednesday 8:30pm – 9:30pm	$70k	✓	$1.75m
195	5	"Nowra Hill, NSW"	1 April 2026	Wednesday 8:30pm – 9:30pm	$90k	✓	$1.55m
196	6	"Horrocks, WA"	8 April 2026	Wednesday 8:30pm – 9:30pm	$25k	✓	$350k
197	7	"Fitzroy North, VIC"	15 April 2026	Wednesday 8:30pm – 9:30pm	$150k	X	—N/a
198	8	"Smithfield, NSW"	22 April 2026	Wednesday 8:30pm – 9:30pm	$40k	✓	$1.25m
199	9	"Yarrawarrah, NSW"	29 April 2026	Wednesday 8:30pm – 9:30pm	$90k	✓	$1.66m
200	10	"St Huberts Island, NSW"	6 May 2026	Wednesday 8:30pm – 9:30pm	$125k (Note: The homeowners actually had a $0 budget, therefore sponsors and community involvement helped raise the budget through products and labour.)	✓	$1.4m
201	11	"Gisborne, VIC"	13 May 2026	Wednesday 8:30pm – 9:30pm	$100k	✓	$1.5m
202	12	"Oatlands, NSW"	20 May 2026	Wednesday 8:30pm – 9:30pm	$110k	✓	$2.735m

=== Specials ===
==== Inside Selling Houses Australia (2014–15) ====
No. in Season	Title	Original airdate	Timeslot	Viewers (Thousands)	Nightly rank
1	"Reject Row"	25 June 2014	Wednesday 8:30 pm – 9:30 pm	132,000	#1
2	"Hoarder Heaven"	2 July 2014	Wednesday 8:30 pm – 9:30 pm	89,000	#3
3	"Decor Disaster"	27 August 2014	Wednesday 8:30 pm – 9:30 pm	73,000	#6
4	"Reno Wreck"	2 October 2014	Thursday 8:30 pm – 9:30 pm	75,000	#1
5	"Horror Houses"	15 January 2015	Thursday 8:30 pm – 9:30 pm	84,000	#1

== DVD releases ==
DVD title	Ep #	Release dates
DVD title	Ep #	Region 4
Series 1	10	15 June 2011
Series 2	10	17 August 2011
Series 3	10	11 January 2012

== See also ==
- Location Location Location Australia
- Deadline Design
- Love It or List It Australia
