= Deadline Design with Shaynna Blaze =

- Also known as: Deadline Design
- Genre: Renovation
- Presented by: Shaynna Blaze
- Starring: Mike Griggs; Yasmine Ghoniem
- Country of origin: Australia
- Original language: English
- No. of seasons: 1
- No. of episodes: 10

Production
- Production location: Melbourne suburbs
- Running time: 60 minutes (including ads)
- Production company: Beyond Productions

Original release
- Network: LifeStyle HOME
- Release: 19 October 2016 – present

Related
- Selling Houses Australia

Deadline Design with Shaynna Blaze (commonly known as Deadline Design) is a 10-part Australian renovation television series which premiered on Wednesday, 19 October 2016 on Foxtel network LifeStyle HOME. The series sees interior designer Shaynna Blaze and her team visit everyday homes to help renovate them in time for a special occasion or event that is to be held at the house.

== Production ==
The location of the series took place around Melbourne, Victoria with filming commencing in November 2015 and concluding in June 2016.

== Synopsis ==
Shaynna Blaze helps everyday homeowners who need to have their home renovated on a budget of their own within a deadline for an event, e.g. baby arrival, milestone birthday, visiting relatives etc. Shaynna enlists the help of builder, Mike Griggs & designer, Yasmine Ghoniem.

== Series overview ==
Season	No. of episodes	Timeslot	Original airdate	
Season	No. of episodes	Timeslot	Series premiere	Series finale
1	10	Wednesday 9:30-10:30 pm	19 October 2016	21 December 2016

== Episodes ==
No.	Title	Original release date	Australian viewers
1	"Blackburn"	19 October 2016	61,000
Peter and Debbie from Blackburn, Victoria purchased their family home eight years ago when their children were young, but now their children are adults, they want to renovate on a budget of $500,000 for their next chapter as empty nesters and want it delivered by their joint 50th birthday party.
2	"Collingwood"	26 October 2016	52,000
Joe and John from Collingwood, Victoria live in a 2 bedroom converted warehouse which was once a lolly factory. It looks streamlined and sleek but it’s highly impractical to live in, they want to renovate on a budget of $110,000 in time for John’s parent’s 70th birthday celebrations.
3	"Box Hill"	2 November 2016	39,000
Jen and Adam from Box Hill, Victoria live in a weatherboard home which they desire to have more space in to accommodate their expanding family. Their preference is for a light filled Scandinavian style. They want to renovate on a budget of $375,000 in time for their son Xavier's first birthday.
4	"Port Melbourne"	9 November 2016	44,000
Helen from Port Melbourne, Victoria lives in a tiny one bedroom apartment which she wants turned into chic, New York style industrial warehouse. She wants the apartment renovated on a budget of $80,000 in time before she leaves for an overseas holiday.
5	"Pascoe Vale"	16 November 2016	45,000
Loretta and Jamie from Pascoe Vale, Victoria live in a 1930s weatherboard in desperate need of a renovation which they want turned into a style inspired by Cuba in colours of blue, grey & white. They want their home renovated on a budget of $105,000 in time for their daughter Angelicas first birthday.
6	"Deepdene"	23 November 2016	67,000
Martin and Theresa from Deepdene, Victoria have a tired and mismatched 1930s clinker brick house. They want the design of the house to tie together with the original house at the front with a modern extension at the back. They want their home renovated on a budget of $260,000 in time for the winter season.
7	"Footscray"	30 November 2016	65,000
Max and Kirby from Footscray, Victoria can't agree on anything, which is why every room in their 100 year old federation house will have a different, eclectic theme as they transform it for their growing family. The want their home designed art deco style with a bit of Alice in Wonderland. They want their home renovated on a budget of $220,000 in time for the arrival of Max's German relatives.
8	"Prahran"	7 December 2016	66,000
Brothers Mark and Scott from Prahran, Victoria bought a single fronted Victorian terrace in their early 20s. They lived together until Mark bought Scott out. Since then Mark hasn't done anything to his home. He wants his home styled modern, sophisticated bachelor pad with an inviting warm feel. He wants his home renovated on a budget of $120,000 in time for a dinner party with his mother and godparents when they visit from Scotland.
9	"Yarraville"	14 December 2016	57,000
A couple with a family from Yarraville, Victoria are quite large with 2 adults, 3 kids, 2 cats, 2 guinea pigs, a gold fish and a great dane the size of a pony. Each Sunday the whole family love to spend time together in their tiny lounge room, but with space at a premium, they want it to be larger. They want the design of the house to be clever and focus mostly on decoration than full scale renovation focusing on the lounge room and study, 2 bedrooms and an ensuite. They want their home renovated on a budget of $70,000 in time for their upcoming theatrical production.
10	"Doncaster"	21 December 2016	61,000
Kathy from Doncaster, Victoria desperate to renovate their huge family home, but husband Alex is forever procrastinating. Their house is a 90s relic, with peach walls, vertical blinds and miles of beige tiles. She wants the design of the house fabulously modern. She wants his home renovated on a budget of $350,000 in time for a family reunion
