= Mickie de Stoop =

Australian radio and television presenter

- Born: Michele de Stoop
- Occupations: television journalist and radio presenter
- Years active: 1974 to present
- Known for: hosting television shows produced and presented by women for women
- Television: No Man's Land, Shoulder to Shoulder

Mickie de Stoop is an Australian former radio and television presenter.

She is credited with helping improve the representation of female journalists on Australian television by hosting daytime current affairs programs in the 1970's that were produced and presented solely by women, including No Man's Land on GTV-9 and Shoulder to Shoulder on ATV-0.

== Television ==
Starting as a reporter on No Man's Land when it launched in March 1974, de Stoop succeeded the original host Tanya Halesworth. After the program was moved to another timeslot which producer Robyn Miller later described as "unworkable" and was also challenged by censorship, it was axed in 1976.

In 1976, a photograph of de Stoop appeared on the front cover of the Christmas edition of Melbourne's Sunday Observer TV magazine.

De Stoop then hosted a program called Shoulder to Shoulder from 1977 to 1978 on ATV-0 but after the show was forced by management to be a light entertainment program rather than a current affairs program, it too was axed.

In 1988, de Stoop was part of the ambitious national Australia Live - Celebration of a Nation telecast, which was held as part of the Australian Bicentenary. Her role during the telecast was to do a live cross from the Victorian High Country.

De Stoop was one of the many former GTV-9 personalities invited back to the original studios in Richmond in 2010 for a special farewell celebration prior to the building being demolished to make way for a new apartment complex.

== Radio ==
De Stoop has had a successful career as a radio presenter.

Throughout her career, de Stoop worked at a variety of radio stations including 2GB, 3DB, 2KY, and 2NC.

== Legacy ==
In 2014, entertainment reporter Peter Ford listed de Stoop as being one of five people in the Australian entertainment industry he personally believed to be a national living treasure. Despite describing his choice as "radical" and declaring his friendship with de Stoop, Ford said he named her in his list of five due to her pivotal role in hosting television programs that were presented by and for women which covered issues that weren't usually discussed on television at that time.
