= Love It or List It Australia =

Australian TV series

- Presented by: Andrew Winter; Neale Whitaker
- Country of origin: Australia
- No. of series: 6
- No. of episodes: 54 (list of episodes)

Production
- Producer: Beyond Productions
- Running time: 60 mins (including ads)

Original release
- Network: LifeStyle
- Release: 27 September 2017 – present

Related
- Love It or List It

Love It or List It Australia is an Australian TV series, based on the Canadian program of the same name, which began airing on LifeStyle on 27 September 2017. The series is hosted by Andrew Winter (Selling Houses Australia) and Neale Whitaker (The Block; Editor of Vogue Living). It is produced exclusively for Foxtel by Beyond Productions.

In October 2017, the series was renewed for a second season. The second season premiered on 26 September 2018. The third season returned on 25 September 2019. The fourth season was set to air in 2020, however, halfway through filming the season was put on hold due to COVID-19. By October 2020, filming had resumed and the season premiered on 29 September 2021. In December 2022, the series was renewed for a fifth season which premiered on 27 September 2023. In January 2025, the series was renewed for a sixth season. The sixth season consisting of 10 episodes premiered on 1 October 2025.

== Format ==
The series follows home owners across the country who are struggling whether to renovate and love the home they are in; or to sell up and find a new dream home somewhere else.

Real estate agent Andrew Winter and Interior designer Neale Whitaker tour the couple's home before meeting with them. The tour usually consists of Andrew finding mostly negative things to say about the residence while Neale is convinced that he can work magic with whatever plans he is given.

At the meetup between the couple and the hosts of the show, both Andrew and Neale are briefed as to what the couple's desires are. Andrew is tasked with searching for a new home for the couple in their desired location that both meets their needs and stays within their desired budget. Meanwhile, Neale is briefed on what the couples would like to see in their current house and his budget for the entire project.

Andrew will find three potential homes for the owners to look through, at each he shows them how the house meets their needs. At the end of each house visit he tells the homeowners the price of the house.

After Neale’s renovation is complete, the homeowners are given a tour of their current home to see what renovations he was able to accomplish. After the tour, Andrew meets with the homeowners and tells them an evaluation of the home's current market value following the renovations. He will then remind the couple what they could have in one of the new homes they looked at and that they would not get that in their current home.

After a moment to deliberate, Andrew & Neale pose a question to the homeowners. They must choose to either Love It, meaning that they will continue to live in their current home with the renovations, or to List It, meaning that they will buy one of the homes Andrew showed them and sell their current home. After they reveal their decision, the homeowners explain their reasoning to Andrew & Neale.

== Hosts ==
Andrew Winter - A television presenter and residential property commentator, known for hosting Selling Houses Australia. He has worked in the property market for more than 25 years, with experience in residential property across rural, urban, historic, and newly built markets.

Neale Whitaker - Previously working as Editor-in-chief of Belle magazine, and currently Editor-at-large at Vogue Living, Whitaker is an expert judge on The Block.

== Series overview ==
| Season | No. of episodes | Timeslot | Originally aired | | Viewership | | | |
| Season | No. of episodes | Timeslot | Series premiere | Series finale | Avg. viewers (thousands) | Most watched episode | Viewers (thousands) | Rank |
|---|---|---|---|---|---|---|---|---|
| 1 | 10 | Wednesday 8:30pm–9:30pm | 27 September 2017 | 29 November 2017 | 136,000 | "Anita & Cameron – Donvale, Vic" | 158,000 | #1 |
| 2 | 13 | Wednesday 8:30pm–9:30pm | 26 September 2018 | 19 December 2018 | 128,000 | "Issac & Renee - Yarrawarrah, NSW" | 177,000 | #2 |
| 3 | 10 | Wednesday 8:30pm–9:30pm | 25 September 2019 | 27 November 2019 | 100,000 | "Kylie & Josh - Kew, VIC" | 122,000 | #2 |
| 4 | 10 | Wednesday 8:30pm–9:30pm | 29 September 2021 | 1 December 2021 | 85,000 | "Ray & Dana - Lilyfield, NSW" | 99,000 | #2 |
| 5 | 10 | Wednesday 8:30pm–9:30pm | 27 September 2023 | 29 November 2023 | 59,000 | "Kristin & Di - Sandgate, QLD" | 73,000 | #2 |
| 6 | 10 | Wednesday 8:30pm–9:30pm | 1 October 2025 | 3 December 2025 | — | | | |

== Episodes ==
=== Season 1 (2017) ===
| Series no. | Season no. | Episode Title | Original air date | Victory | | Viewers (thousands) | Nightly Rank |
| Series no. | Season no. | Episode Title | Original air date | Andrew | Neale | Viewers (thousands) | Nightly Rank |
|---|---|---|---|---|---|---|---|
| 1 | 1 | "Jess & Chris – Cooparoo, QLD" | 27 September 2017 | X | | 117,000 | #3 |
| 2 | 2 | "John & Sharyn – St Ives Chase, NSW" | 4 October 2017 | | X | 138,000 | #2 |
| 3 | 3 | "Leanne & Glen – Canterbury, NSW" | 11 October 2017 | X | | 105,000 | #2 |
| 4 | 4 | "Kieran & Riley – Paddington, NSW" | 18 October 2017 | | X | 119,000 | #1 |
| 5 | 5 | "Natalie – North Coburg, Vic" | 25 October 2017 | X | | 121,000 | #2 |
| 6 | 6 | "Beck & Nick – Morningside, QLD" | 1 November 2017 | | X | 154,000 | #2 |
| 7 | 7 | "Mel & Macca – Park Orchards, Vic" | 8 November 2017 | | X | 127,000 | #2 |
| 8 | 8 | "Grayson & Margie – Jindalee, QLD" | 15 November 2017 | X | | 112,000 | #5 |
| 9 | 9 | "Anita & Cameron – Donvale, Vic" | 22 November 2017 | | X | 158,000 | #2 |
| 10 | 10 | "Anna & Simon – Rozelle, NSW" | 29 November 2017 | | X | 141,000 | #1 |

=== Season 2 (2018) ===
| Series no. | Season no. | Episode Title | Original air date | Victory | | Viewers (thousands) | Nightly Rank |
| Series no. | Season no. | Episode Title | Original air date | Andrew | Neale | Viewers (thousands) | Nightly Rank |
|---|---|---|---|---|---|---|---|
| 11 | 1 | "Paul & Michelle - Boondall, QLD" | 26 September 2018 | | X | 135,000 | #3 |
| 12 | 2 | "Belinda & Cameron - Brighton, VIC" | 3 October 2018 | X | | 122,000 | #2 |
| 13 | 3 | "Con & Rita - Preston, VIC" | 10 October 2018 | | X | 115,000 | #2 |
| 14 | 4 | "Georgia & John - Corinda, QLD" | 17 October 2018 | X | | 107,000 | #2 |
| 15 | 5 | "Issac & Renee - Yarrawarrah, NSW" | 24 October 2018 | | X | 177,000 | #2 |
| 16 | 6 | "Antony & Tracey - Tea Tree Gully, SA" | 31 October 2018 | | X | 150,000 | #2 |
| 17 | 7 | "Nat & Tim - Picnic Point, NSW" | 7 November 2018 | | X | 135,000 | #1 |
| 18 | 8 | "Ange & Sonia - Daisy Hill, QLD" | 14 November 2018 | X | | 108,000 | #1 |
| 19 | 9 | "Tom & Erin - Toowong, QLD" | 21 November 2018 | | X | 125,000 | #6 |
| 20 | 10 | "Vicki & Mark - Newport, NSW" | 28 November 2018 | | X | 141,000 | #1 |
| 21 | 11 | "Craig & Belinda - Ashmore, QLD" | 5 December 2018 | X | | 124,000 | #1 |
| 22 | 12 | "Jackie & Peter - Sandringham, VIC" | 12 December 2018 | | X | 133,000 | #1 |
| 23 | 13 | "James & Brendan - Brunswick, VIC" | 19 December 2018 | X | | 96,000 | #5 |

=== Season 3 (2019) ===
| Series no. | Season no. | Episode Title | Original air date | Victory | | Viewers (thousands) | Nightly Rank |
| Series no. | Season no. | Episode Title | Original air date | Andrew | Neale | Viewers (thousands) | Nightly Rank |
|---|---|---|---|---|---|---|---|
| 24 | 1 | "Rachael & Ryan - Greenslopes, QLD" | 25 September 2019 | | X | 98,000 | #2 |
| 25 | 2 | "Tom & Katie - Surry Hills, NSW" | 2 October 2019 | X | | 104,000 | #3 |
| 26 | 3 | "Mark & Amanda - Hampton, VIC" | 9 October 2019 | | X | 107,000 | #3 |
| 27 | 4 | "Kylie & Josh - Kew, VIC" | 16 October 2019 | X | | 122,000 | #2 |
| 28 | 5 | "Lyndi & Les - Frewville, SA" | 23 October 2019 | X | | 88,000 | #1 |
| 29 | 6 | "Damien & Olivia - Ormiston, QLD" | 30 October 2019 | | X | 85,000 | #4 |
| 30 | 7 | "Sam & Uttam - Wheelers Hill, VIC" | 6 November 2019 | | X | 76,000 | #1 |
| 31 | 8 | "Karen & Darrel - Tarragindi, QLD" | 13 November 2019 | X | | 108,000 | #1 |
| 32 | 9 | "Anna & Antony - Essendon, VIC" | 20 November 2019 | | X | 115,000 | #1 |
| 33 | 10 | "Nathan & Emily - Oyster Bay, NSW" | 27 November 2019 | | X | 101,000 | #1 |

=== Season 4 (2021) ===
| Series no. | Season no. | Episode Title | Original air date | Victory | | Viewers (thousands) | Nightly Rank |
| Series no. | Season no. | Episode Title | Original air date | Andrew | Neale | Viewers (thousands) | Nightly Rank |
|---|---|---|---|---|---|---|---|
| 34 | 1 | "Ciara & Andrew - Pascoe Vale, VIC" | 29 September 2021 | X | | 75,000 | #5 |
| 35 | 2 | "Ray & Dana - Lilyfield, NSW" | 6 October 2021 | X | | 99,000 | #2 |
| 36 | 3 | "Jules and Erin - Wooloowin, QLD" | 13 October 2021 | | X | 91,000 | #2 |
| 37 | 4 | "Megan and Justin - Bondi, NSW" | 20 October 2021 | X | | 88,000 | #2 |
| 38 | 5 | "Sibon and Gerard - Hunters Hill, NSW" | 27 October 2021 | | X | 92,000 | #2 |
| 39 | 6 | "Nikki & Rob - Waverley, NSW" | 3 November 2021 | | X | 86,000 | #2 |
| 40 | 7 | "Skye & Jacob - Kew East, VIC" | 10 November 2021 | | X | 88,000 | #2 |
| 41 | 8 | "Brendon & Michelle - Denham Court, NSW" | 17 November 2021 | | X | 87,000 | #1 |
| 42 | 9 | "Anna & Terence - Blackburn, VIC" | 24 November 2021 | X | | 68,000 | #2 |
| 43 | 10 | "Nora & Blair- Karrinyup, WA" | 1 December 2021 | X | | 79,000 | #1 |

=== Season 5 (2023) ===
| Series no. | Season no. | Episode Title | Original air date | Victory | | Viewers (thousands) | Nightly Rank |
| Series no. | Season no. | Episode Title | Original air date | Andrew | Neale | Viewers (thousands) | Nightly Rank |
|---|---|---|---|---|---|---|---|
| 44 | 1 | "Brett & Anita - Windsor, QLD" | 27 September 2023 | | X | 57,000 | #5 |
| 45 | 2 | "Karen & Paul - Wheelers Hill, VIC" | 4 October 2023 | X | | 46,000 | #5 |
| 46 | 3 | "Tamara & Stef - Earlwood, NSW" | 11 October 2023 | | X | 58,000 | #3 |
| 47 | 4 | "Kristin & Di - Sandgate, QLD" | 18 October 2023 | X | | 73,000 | #2 |
| 48 | 5 | “Joel & Anna - Prahan, VIC” | 25 October 2023 | | X | 59,000 | #4 |
| 49 | 6 | “Mel & Blake - Miranda, NSW” | 1 November 2023 | | X | 55,000 | #3 |
| 50 | 7 | “Leonie & Noel - Waterways, VIC” | 8 November 2023 | X | | 55,000 | #4 |
| 51 | 8 | “Hayley & Paul - Cromer, NSW” | 15 November 2023 | X | | 63,000 | #4 |
| 52 | 9 | “Nic & Rich - Labrador, QLD” | 22 November 2023 | | X | 51,000 | #4 |
| 53 | 10 | “Brad & Mel - Russell Lea, NSW” | 29 November 2023 | X | | 72,000 | #1 |

=== Season 6 (2025) ===
| Series no. | Season no. | Episode Title | Original air date | Victory | |
| Series no. | Season no. | Episode Title | Original air date | Andrew | Neale |
|---|---|---|---|---|---|
| 54 | 1 | "Caroline & Courtney - Cammeray, NSW" | 1 October 2025 | | X |
| 55 | 2 | "Vanessa & Tony - Mermaid Beach, QLD" | 8 October 2025 | | X |
| 56 | 3 | "Ben & Linda - Camperdown, NSW" | 15 October 2025 | X | |
| 57 | 4 | "Katie & Kyoko - Byron Bay, NSW" | 22 October 2025 | | X |
| 58 | 5 | "Rob & Jess - Research, VIC" | 29 October 2025 | | X |
| 59 | 6 | "Carney & Catherine - Dover Heights, NSW" | 5 November 2025 | X | |
| 60 | 7 | "Brooke & Mick - Buderim, QLD" | 12 November 2025 | X | |
| 61 | 8 | "Tracey & Joel - Collinswood, SA" | 19 November 2025 | | X |
| 62 | 9 | "Fiona & Alex - Redcliffe, QLD" | 26 November 2025 | | X |
| 63 | 10 | "Michelle & Adrian - Baulkham Hills, NSW" | 3 December 2025 | | X |
