= Brian Wilshire =

Australian radio broadcaster (1944–2026)

Brian Wilshire (30 March 1944 – 13 January 2026) was an Australian radio broadcaster for 2GB in Sydney. He hosted the Australia Overnight program (12:00 am – 3:30 am) until 11 December 2015. The signature tune of the program show was "Hanky Panky" by Pete Fountain.

== Background ==
Brian Wilshire was born in Strathfield on 30 March 1944. He began his radio career in November 1969 at 2NZ in Inverell. He won almost every survey at 2GB for 36 years.

Wilshire had many interests including snow skiing, car racing, winning his class in at the 1993 Bathurst 12 Hour, writing books (his The Fine Print was Australia's best-selling book in 1992 and playing drums in the bands Stringybark and Koala Soup.

He expressed sceptical views on mainstream climate change science.

== Controversy over racial comments ==
On 16 December 2005, Wilshire was forced to make a public apology after saying on air that many Middle East immigrants were inbred as a result of consanguinity and thus hard to educate.

Many of them (referring to the carloads of youths who invaded the Sutherland Shire following the Cronulla riots) have parents who are first cousins whose parents were first cousins. The result of this is inbreeding – the result of which is uneducationable [sic] people...and very low IQ.

His comments were met with outrage. "It reveals an uneducated comment on his part – they are disgraceful comments", then premier, Morris Iemma, said.

Stephen Stanton, spokesman for the Lebanese human rights organisation Cedarwatch, said:

One is [Sydney radio] 2GB and the moronic manner that gargling boofhead has been berating and denigrating you. The airwaves are useless if they are used by people such as that. The other is newspapers such as The Australian

Following condemnation, including by Iemma, Wilshire apologised for his comments.

He returned to 2GB Overnights in about May 2016, only about five months after retiring.

== Personal life and death ==
Wilshire was married to his wife, Ruth, for over 45 years before her death in December 2023. They had two children.

Wilshire died on 13 January 2026 at the age of 81.

== Bibliography ==
- The Fine Print: Australia's Special Role in the New World Order (1992)
- Fine Print 2 (1993)
- "One Man Banned" (1996) with Peter Sawyer
- Monday School: What They Didn't Teach You in Sunday School (1996)
