= Dennis Scott (rugby league) =

Australian rugby league footballer

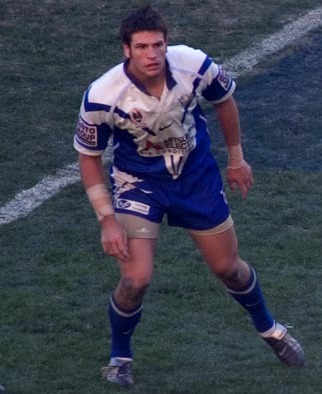

Personal information
- Born: 15 June 1976 (age 50) Moranbah, Queensland, Australia

Playing information
- Height: 188 cm (6 ft 2 in)
- Weight: 100 kg (15 st 10 lb)
- Position: Prop, Second-row
Club
Years	Team	Pld	T	G	FG	P
1996–98	Brisbane Broncos	6	0	0	0	0
1999–04	Canterbury Bulldogs	103	8	0	0	32
2005	Melbourne Storm	19	3	0	0	12
	Total	128	11	0	0	44

Dennis Scott (born 15 June 1976) is an Australian former professional rugby league footballer who played as a prop and second-row forward in the 1990s and 2000s.

He played for the Brisbane Broncos in the ARL Premiership, Super League and the NRL, and the Canterbury Bulldogs and the Melbourne Storm in the National Rugby League.

== Background ==
Scott began playing junior rugby league for Moranbah Sharks before being graded by Brisbane.

== Playing career ==
Scott made his first grade debut for Brisbane against Auckland in Round 22 1996. Scott played with Brisbane up until the end of 1998 but did not play in the club's back to back premiership victories.

In 1999, Scott joined Canterbury-Bankstown and played more regularly over the next five seasons but was not selected to play in the club's 2004 premiership winning side.

In 2005, Scott joined Melbourne Storm and played one season with them before retiring due to lingering injuries during the 2006 season. He had been appointed as one of the members of Melbourne's rotational captaincy group, but never took the field as captain.

== Post-playing career ==
After Scott retired from Rugby League, he did an apprenticeship in carpentry. This led him into the landscaping industry, with developing his company "Lush Landscape Solutions". In 2021, it was announced that he would be joining Foxtel's lifestyle television program Selling Houses Australia as the exterior and garden designer, when the program returned for the 2022 TV season, after a 2-year absence.
