= Better Homes and Gardens (TV program) =

- Genre: Lifestyle; Home improvement
- Created by: Peter E. Fox (1993–1995)
- Presented by: Johanna Griggs (2005–present); Noni Hazlehurst (1995–2004)
- Theme music composer: Paul McCartney
- Opening theme: "Getting Better" by The Beatles
- Composer: Jay Stewart
- Country of origin: Australia
- Original language: English
- No. of seasons: 29
- No. of episodes: 1,229

Production
- Executive producer: Russell Palmer
- Producer: Rani Eaton
- Production locations: Sydney, Australia
- Running time: 90 minutes

Original release
- Network: Seven Network
- Release: 24 January 1995 – present

Better Homes and Gardens is an Australian television program which is broadcast on the Seven Network, which is based on the magazine of the same name domestically published by Are Media (itself licensing the brand and magazine format from the American Dotdash Meredith). The program covers a wide variety of lifestyle related topics. These include, gardening, landscaping, architecture, cooking, DIY, pet care, and home improvement, as well as featuring celebrity guests. The show is hosted by former Commonwealth Games swimmer-turned-television presenter Johanna Griggs, who has hosted the program since 2005.

In 2014, Better Homes and Gardens was awarded a record 12th Silver Logie Award for Australia's Most Popular Lifestyle Program.

== History ==
The show was created by Peter E. Fox, who was also an executive producer for the 1995 series, along with Grahame Duckham. This was for the original magazine publisher, Murdoch Magazines and executive director Mark Kelly. The series aired its 1000th episode on 29 June 2018.

Russell Palmer became the Executive Producer in June 2018 and has overseen a number of changes and refreshes since then.

Gardening guru Graham Ross has appeared on the show since 1995, presenting over 700 episodes.

Resident vet Dr. Harry Cooper joined the team in 2004 and has been providing pet information and advice to viewers ever since.

Ed Halmagyi (known on the show as 'Fast Ed') joined the team in 2004 he transforms elegant restaurant cuisine into recipes that anyone can prepare at home. Melbourne Chef Karen Martini joined the show in 2006 bringing with her a love of relaxed cooking with fresh, healthy, seasonal produce.

Builder Adam Dovile joined the show in 2015 after winning season two of House Rules in 2014, and is the go-to for DIY projects on the show.

In January 2020, Charlie Albone, James Tobin and Melissa King joined the show as presenters.

Albone's partner Juliet Love is the show's designer and decorator and joined the show in 2021.

In November 2023, Halmagyi announced he is departing the series after 20 years to focus on a personal business venture, his last episode was aired on 1 December 2023.

== Presenters ==
=== Host ===
Current Host

- Johanna Griggs (2005–present)

Former Host

- Graham Ross (2004)
- Noni Hazlehurst (1995–2004)
- John Jarratt (1995–1998)

=== Food ===
Current Food Presenters

- Colin Fassnidge (2024–present)
- Clarissa Feildel (2024–present)

Previous Food Presenters

- Karen Martini (2007–2024)
- Ed Halmagyi known as Fast Ed (2004–2023)
- Pete Evans (2018–2020)
- Maeve O'Meara (2000–2007)
- Belinda Jeffrey (1996–2000)

=== Gardening ===
Current Gardening Presenters

- Graham Ross (1995–present)
- Charlie Albone (2020–present)
- Melissa King (2020–present)

Previous Gardening Presenters

- Jason Hodges (2005–2019) (Landscaping)
- Linda Ross (1996–2000)
- Colm O'Leary (1995–1996)

=== Architecture ===
Current Architecture Presenters

- Peter Colquhoun (2003–present)

Previous Architecture Presenters

- Grahame Bond (1998–2002)
- Tony Fragar (1996)

=== Decorating/Design ===
Current Decorating/Design Presenters

- Juliet Love (2021–present)

Previous Decorating/Design Presenters

- Tara Dennis (2006–2020)
- Lissanne Oliver (2005)
- Gwen Jones Palmer (2004)
- Monica Trapaga (1997–2003)
- Fiona Connolly (1996–2004) (Craft)
- Sandy de Beyer (1996)
- Noni Hazlehurst (1995)

=== DIY ===
Current DIY Presenters

- Adam Dovile (2015–present)

Previous DIY Presenters

- Rob Palmer (2004–2014)
- Scott McGregor (1999–2003)
- John Jarratt (1995–1998)

=== Motoring & Technology ===
Former Motoring & Technology Presenter

- James Tobin (2020–2023)

=== Health & Fitness ===
Previous Health & Fitness Presenters

- Sam Wood (2020–2021)

=== Pets ===
Current Pets Presenters

- Harry Cooper (2004–present)

Previous Pets Presenters

- Noni Hazlehurst (1995–2003)

=== Better Living (consumer advice) ===
- Noni Hazlehurst (1995–1997)

== Broadcast ==
The program originally aired on Tuesdays at 7:30 pm and ran back to back with The Great Outdoors until the travel program was moved to Mondays early in the 2000s. It then aired before Room For Improvement, which was hosted by then-DIY presenter Scott McGregor. Better Homes was moved to Saturday nights at 7.30 pm in 2004, before being shifted to 6.30pm. Both timeslots were reportedly disastrous for ratings and the show struggled immensely against Australian rules football on other networks. In 2005, it was shifted to 7:30pm on Friday nights, where it has enjoyed ratings success since. It is now the longest-running Australian TV lifestyle program and the highest rating show on Australian TV. It was often among the top 10 rating programs in Australia during the 1990s, sometimes with audiences in excess of two million.

From 2007 until 2011, the Seven Network showed Better Homes and Gardens at 7:30 pm., prior to its coverage of Friday Night Football starting at 8:30 pm. This was a very successful timeslot for the show, but the scheduling was unpopular amongst football fans on the east coast, because it meant that the football was shown on a one-hour delayed telecast (except for matches in Perth, which were live due to the time difference). Sports fans and media continually called for Seven to shift Better Homes and Gardens and show the football live, but Seven preferred to leave the show in its top-rating timeslot, moving it only for particularly large matches. Better Homes and Gardens was forced into a new timeslot at the start of the 2012 AFL season, as the new AFL Broadcast Rights deal forced Seven to show the football live on Friday nights. Better Homes now airs in all states on Friday nights at 7:00 pm on Channel 7 when the AFL is not on and 7two when the AFL is on. From March 2026, the series began airing on Friday and Saturday nights during the AFL schedule.

== Awards ==
Year	Award	Category	Result	Ref.
2025	TV Week Logies	Best Lifestyle Program	Nominated	

== See also ==
- List of longest-running Australian television series
- List of Seven Network programs
- List of Australian television series
