= Speediance Life Technology Inc. =

Chinese exercise equipment company

- Industry: Fitness Technology, Smart Home Gym, Exercise Equipment
- Founded: 2020
- Founder: Liu Tao
- Headquarters: Shenzhen, China
- Website: www.speediance.com

Speediance Life Technology Inc. is a Chinese fitness technology company that designs and manufactures smart home gym equipment. Its product, Gym Monster, is a smart home gym that gives users up to 220 lb (100 kg) of resistance.

== Background ==
Speediance was founded in December 2020 by Liu Tao. The company launched its first product, the Gym Monster, through a Kickstarter campaign in 2021. In 2024, the company introduced the Gym Monster 2 and the VeloNix stationary bike, expanding its connected-fitness lineup.

== Reception ==
In a review of Speediance Gym Monster 2, Will GreenWald of PCMag said it is "a reasonably equipped workhorse of an exercise machine" that is ideal for individuals with experience in exercising. He recommended Tonal 2, a product from a competitor, as "a better pick" for those who can afford a higher cost and possess a wall to attach it to. Wired reviewer Kristin Canning noticed a software bug in how summaries of workouts were computed and lamented that the product had a resistance limit of 220 lb (100 kg). She concluded though that the Gym Monster 2 is "a major asset to my lifting routine" in allowing her "to lift heavier than my adjustable dumbbells allow at home, without having to devote my garage to a massive squat rack".

== Awards ==
- In 2025, Speediance’s Gym Monster 2 and VeloNix won the FIT Sport Design Awards – Sports Equipment Design of the Year in the Fitness & Gymnastic category.
- In 2025, the Gym Monster 2 was recognized as a winner in the Fitness Technology (FitTech) category at the Global Tech Awards.
- In 2025, the company's product also won "Best Gadget" award from IFA.

== Controversies ==
In November 2023, U.S. fitness company Tonal Systems, Inc. filed a lawsuit against Speediance alleging infringement of six patents and false advertising related to the Gym Monster. The suit sought damages and production halts. The lawsuit was dismissed without prejudice in 2024.
