= Lifestyle Home =

- Country: Australia
- Broadcast area: Australia

Programming
- Language: English
- Picture format: 576i (SDTV 16:9)

Ownership
- Owner: Foxtel Networks
- Sister channels: Foxtel Networks channels

History
- Launched: 1 March 2011
- Replaced: HOW TO Channel

Lifestyle Home (stylised as Lifestyle HOME) is an Australian subscription television channel dedicated to home and property programming. It ranges from home improvements to home investments, renovation, gardens and property.

== Programming ==
=== Original programming ===
- Shaynna's World of Design (2015)
- Tiny House Australia (2016–present)
- I Own Australia's Best Home (2016–present)
- Deadline Design (2016–present)

=== Acquired programming ===
- A Place in the Sun
- Homes Under the Hammer
- Holmes On Homes
- Carter Can
- The Outdoor Room with Jamie Durie
- Mark Burnett's Design Star
- May the Best House Win
- House Gift
- My Dream Home
- Colin & Justin's Home Heist
- Property Virgins
- Axe The Agent

== See also ==
- Lifestyle
- Lifestyle You
- Lifestyle Food
