= Didi and B. =

- Genre: Children's television series
- Written by: Abby Pecoriello
- Directed by: Peter Cudlipp
- Composer: Sean Peter
- Country of origin: Australia
- Original language: English

Production
- Executive producer: Kristie Phelan
- Producer: Kala Ellis
- Production company: Odd Studio

Original release
- Network: Nickelodeon
- Release: 3 May 2012 – 2014

Didi and B. is an Australian children's television series airing on Nickelodeon Australia, and Nick Jr UK. Rather than animation, the show uses puppetry.

== Plot ==
Set in an enchanted garden, the series features two insect hosts: Didi the butterfly wings and B, a bumblebee. Together, they aim to teach and reinforce fundamental skills to young viewers through interactive games and songs.

== Characters ==
- Didi - Didi is a girl an optimistic pink butterfly wings whose best friend is B. She lives in a mulberry tree.
- B. - Didi's brother, B. is a friendly "spelling bee" who resides in a mushroom house close to the tree.

== DVD Episodes ==
Disc 1 Contains

- Dazzle Day
- Our Sandy Adventure
- Sing-A-Longs (Rhyme)
- Play Along (Rhyme)
- Love Bugs (Rhyme)
- Rhyme Time (Rhyme)
- DIY with Didi (Rhyme)
- Colour in a Mulberry with Didi (Rhyme)
- Colour in an India with Didi (Rhyme)
- Colour in a Violet with Didi (Rhyme)
- Colour in an Eggplant with Didi (Rhyme)
- Colour in an Apple with Didi (Rhyme)
- Colour in a Topaz with Didi (Rhyme)
- Colour in a Sapphire with Didi (Rhyme)
- Just Joshing (Rhyme)
- Playdate (Rhyme)

Disc 2 Contains

- Goodnight Song
- Days of the Week
- Love, Love, Love
- DIY Petal Portrait (Rhyme)
- Hide and Seek (Rhyme)
- DIY Miniature Garden (Rhyme)
- Camping Capers
- Crazy Craft Day
- Songs with Didi and B.
- Story Time
- My House
- Castles in the Kitchen
- Didi's Tea Party
- Do a Salt Painting Yourself? (Rhyme)
- Do a Rain Painting Yourself! (Rhyme)
- Make a Pet Rock Yourself! (Rhyme)
- Make Your Own Foil Crown with Didi and B.
- B. Song
- Munchy Crunchy Lunch
- Alphabet (Rhyme)

== Merchandise ==
The first Didi and B. merchandise to be released was a CD titled "Dazzle Day," featuring thirteen of the show's songs. There was also a Didi and B. DVD release featuring eight episodes.
