= Charlie Albone =

Australian landscape designer (born c.1981)

- Born: c. 1981; Hong Kong
- Occupations: Landscape designer television personality
- Years active: 2008–present
- Known for: Selling Houses Australia; Better Homes and Gardens
- Spouse: Juliet Love (m. 2010)
- Children: 2

Charles Albone (born c. 1981) is an English landscape designer and television presenter known for co-hosting Selling Houses Australia (2008–20). He has also hosted other shows including The Party Garden, Charlie and the Flower Show and Chelsea's Greatest Garden. In 2020, Albone joined the cast of Better Homes and Gardens.

== Biography ==
Albone was born in Hong Kong, of English heritage, his father was a flight engineer and his mother was a flight attendant. At the age of twelve he moved to the United Kingdom where he attended Sidcot School in Somerset. Here he developed an interest in gardening and landscaping. A few years later he began working maintaining the grounds of an English country manor, with no formal qualifications, Albone learnt his trade on the job and worked for many UK landscaping companies before travelling to Australia on a working holiday. He decided to move to Australia and has been living there ever since. He completed a diploma of horticulture and landscape design and started his own landscaping company called Inspired Exteriors.

Albone is married to stylist, interior designer and television host Juliet Love and they have two children. He now considers himself an Australian and is proud to be representing his adopted country. 'I like to think that I'm representing Australia and the rest of my team are Australian, my training, my life my family are all in Australia,' he said. 'I see myself as an Australian going over there rather than an Englishman going back'.

== Television shows ==
While studying at TAFE, Albone received an email from the Australian Institute of Landscape Designers and Managers telling him he should try out for a place on a new TV show. Albone applied and was successful in being part of Selling Houses Australia.

In 2008, Albone made his TV debut on Selling Houses Australia on Foxtel's The LifeStyle Channel. In its twelfth season as of 2019, he has been a key member of the team; specialising in gardens and exterior make-overs for houses being sold. Albone has also hosted other LifeStyle Channel shows including The Party Garden, Charlie and the Flower Show and more recently, Chelsea's Greatest Garden.

In 2015, Albone won a silver-gilt medal at the Chelsea Flower Show. The creation of his entry was documented for a two-part television special, Charlie's Chelsea Garden, which aired on The LifeStyle Channel. In 2016 Albone won a second silver-gilt medal on the Chelsea Flower Show in London making him the first Australian to compete two times at the show and winning it.

In February 2020, Charlie Albone announced he would be leaving Selling Houses Australia and would be joining Seven Network's Better Homes and Gardens as a gardener from 2020.
