= 2GB =

Radio station in Sydney, Australia

- Sydney, New South Wales; Australia
- Broadcast area: Sydney RA1
- Frequency: 873 kHz
- Branding: 2GB 873

Programming
- Language: English
- Format: Talk radio

Ownership
- Owner: Tapt Media; (Harbour Radio Pty Ltd)
- Sister stations: Nine Network; 3AW; 4BC; 6PR

History
- First air date: 23 August 1926; 100 years ago
- Former frequencies: 950 kHz(1926–1935); 870 kHz (1935–1978)
- Call sign meaning: Giordano Bruno

Technical information
- Licensing authority: ACMA
- Power: 5 kW
- Transmitter coordinates: 33.8542°S 151.0650°E

Links
- Public licence information: Profile
- Website: www.2gb.com

2GB is a commercial radio station in Sydney, Australia, owned by Tapt Media.

2GB broadcasts on 873 kHz, AM.

In 2024, 2GB held 14% of the total radio ratings share, making it one of the most widely listened-to radio stations in Sydney.

== History ==
2GB commenced intermittent broadcasting in August 1926. The operator, Theosophical Broadcasting Station Pty Ltd, owned by interests associated with the local branch of Theosophical Society Adyar, was granted a radio broadcasting licence for the Sydney area. The initials honour Giordano Bruno. George A. Saunders, previously with 2BL, became 2GB's first station manager and (as "Uncle George") on-air personality in 1927.

2GB became the first Australian station to play transcription records by 1933, holding the world's largest transcribed record library at the time.

The controlling interest in the station was purchased by Denison Estates Ltd in 1936. A new board of directors was appointed under chairman Hugh Denison and included Frederick Daniell and A. E. Bennett, who continued as station manager.

In what radio historian and writer Richard Lane termed "The Golden Age of Australian Radio Drama", Denison and his media adviser Daniell inaugurated the Broadcasting Service Association Players, renamed the Macquarie Players in 1938.

2GB produced local weekly serials such as Dolly and Dan and Doctor Mac, and presented a full-length drama on Sunday afternoons. Writers included John E. C. Appleton, Lynn Foster, E. Mason Wood, William L. Power (who dramatised Helen de Guerry Simpson's Boomerang, a series on "Famous Escapes", and Tales Told to Peter and Pam, a popular children's series), E. V. Timms and Ken Pawley.

Actors included James Raglan, Lou Vernon, Peter Finch, Betty Suttor and Harry Dearth.

The station launched the Macquarie Radio Network, in February 1938, in competition with the Major Network, started by fellow Sydney station 2UE.

"Calling the Stars" was an expensive show created locally and sponsored by Colgate-Palmolive. The stars of the show included comedians Jack Davey, `Mo’ (Roy Rene) and Willie Fennell. Dorothy (Dilly) Foster and Rita Pauncefort read double entendres as the not too bright, "Ada and Elsie" in a script written by Foster until 1954.

In 1940, the station became the largest producer of radio drama programs in the Southern Hemisphere. During World War II, 2GB provided transcription records to the Australian Army's network of radio stations in Papua New Guinea and the Pacific Islands.

Station announcer Ted Harris, aided by American Ted Schroeder, became the first man to give a direct ball-by-ball description of the Davis Cup from Forest Hills to Australia on 27 August 1955. Two years later, 2GB became the first Australian station to air news bulletins on the hour, every hour during its broadcast day.

Prior to 1964, the controlling interest (45%) was held by Broadcasting Associates Pty Ltd, with 14% owned by John Fairfax, and the balance owned by various smaller shareholders. Broadcasting Associates was owned by ATV (Australia) Pty Ltd, the Australian subsidiary of ITV company Associated Television. In 1964, Fairfax purchased ATV's Australian assets, including the 45% share in 2GB.

Although the ownership of the station has subsequently passed to strictly commercial interests, the Theosophical Society was still presenting programmes on the station as late as 1975.

Ray Hadley, previously with 2UE, became a presenter at the station in 2001.

2GB had a standby mast and its original 873 AM transmitter tower at Wentworth Point at Homebush Bay. Its location was visible via the Ryde Bridge, and also via the train line to Rhodes and Concord train stations. Due to a redevelopment occurring on the same land, the tower was brought down on Friday 11 September 2015. A month or two before, a new tower was erected for 2GB and is now situated at the 2KY transmitter site, also in Homebush. In October 2012, following the Alan Jones "died of shame" controversy, 2GB suspended advertising on the Alan Jones show. This decision was reversed in October 2012, but many advertisers declined to return to sponsoring the program.

In June 2014, Michael Smith was fired as fill-in commentator for calling Muhammad a paedophile; Program Director David Kidd referred to Muhammad as a deity.

== Merger ==
On 1 April 2015 The Macquarie Radio Network merged with the Fairfax Radio Network of Fairfax Media. The news teams of 2UE and 2GB are being merged with "significant job cuts." Consequently, on 9 April 2015 the 2UE newsroom was closed.

== Callsign and frequency ==
The number 2 of the callsign refers to the state of New South Wales, which also has postcodes starting with 2. The two letters GB indicate an AM station, and were chosen to honour the Italian philosopher Giordano Bruno, who was much admired by Theosophists. Its original frequency allocation was 950 kHz and moved to 870 kHz in 1935, then to 873 on 23 November 1978, when channel separation was reduced from 10 kHz to 9 kHz as a result of an international medium wave frequency realignment. It has also been attributed to Grace Brothers the department store building where the station originally broadcast from.

== Current presenters ==
=== Monday to Thursday ===
Program	Presenters	Times
Australia Overnight (Mon)	Mike Jeffreys	12 am to 5:30 am
Australia Overnight (Tues-Thurs)	Phil O'Neil	12 am to 5:30 am
Ben Fordham Live	Ben Fordham	5:30 am to 9 am
The Mark Levy Morning Show	Mark Levy	9 am to 12 pm
2GB Afternoons	Michael McLaren	12 pm to 3 pm
Sydney Now	James Willis	3 pm to 6 pm
Sports Today	Adam Hawse	6 pm to 7 pm
Money News	Clinton Maynard	7 pm to 8 pm
Nights with John Stanley	John Stanley	8 pm to 12 am

=== Friday ===
Program	Presenters	Times
Australia Overnight	Phil O'Neil	12 am to 5:30 am
Ben Fordham Live	Ben Fordham	5:30 am to 9 am
The Mark Levy Morning Show	Mark Levy	9 am to 12 pm
2GB Afternoons	Michael McLaren	12 pm to 3 pm
Sydney Now	James Willis	3 pm to 6 pm
Sports Today	Adam Hawse	6 pm to 7 pm
The Continuous Call Team	Various NRL Presenters	7 pm to 11 pm (NRL season)
Nights with John Stanley	John Stanley	7 pm to 11 pm (NRL off-season)
The Mark Levy Morning Show	Mark Levy	11 pm to 12 am

=== Saturday ===
Program	Presenters	Times
Australia Overnight	Pat Panetta	12 am to 6 am
The Garden Clinic	Sandra Ross; Graham Ross	6 am to 8 am
Life and Technology	Charlie Brown	8 am to 9 am
Weekends with Luke Grant	Luke Grant	9 am to 1 pm
The Continuous Call Team	Darryl Brohman; Paul Gallen; Josh Morris	1 pm to 10 pm (NRL season)
Weekend Afternoons	Trent Nikolic	1 pm to 6 pm (NRL off-season)
Saturday Night with Spiro	Spiro Christopoulos	6 pm - 10 pm
The Country Music Countdown	Robert Smith	10 pm to 12 am

=== Sunday ===
Program	Presenters	Times
Australia Overnight	Pat Panetta	12 am to 6 am
The Garden Clinic	Sandra Ross; Graham Ross	6 am to 8 am
The House of Wellness	Gerald Quigley; Sarah Maree-Cameron; Zoe Bingley–Pullin	8 am to 9 am
Weekends with Luke Grant	Luke Grant	9 am to 1 pm
The Continuous Call Team	Darryl Brohman; Mark Riddell; Neil Breen	1 pm to 6 pm (NRL season)
Weekend Afternoons	Trent Nikolic	1 pm to 6 pm (NRL off-season)
Healthy Living	Dr. Ross Walker	6 pm to 9 pm
Sunday Night with Bill Crews	Rev. Bill Crews	9 pm to 12 am

== Former presenters ==
- Brian Carlton
- Philip Clark
- Jack Davey
- Bob Dyer
- Terry Dear
- John Dease
- Ken Howard (race caller)
- John Tapp (race caller)
- John Pearce
- Gwen Plumb
- Dita Cobb
- Ian McRae
- Grant Goldman (formerly with 2SM)
- Tim Webster (now with 2SM)
- Jim Wilson
- Malcolm T. Elliott
- John Laws
- Mike Carlton
- Bob Rogers
- Peter Hand
- Owen Delaney (Australia Overnight)
- Jason Morrison
- Jim Ball
- Luke Bona
- Alan Jones
- Terry Willesee
- Kerri-Anne Kennerley
- Stan Zemanek
- Graham Richardson
- Clive Robertson
- Glenn Wheeler
- Brian Wilshire
- Ross Greenwood
- Steve Price
- Ron Casey
- Chris O'Keefe
- Ray Hadley
- Mike Jeffreys
- Murray Olds & Murray Wilton
