= Andrew Winter (real estate) =

Australian television presenter

- Born: Andrew Thomas Winter; 1 March 1972 (age 54); London, England
- Occupations: Real estate agent, television personality, author
- Years active: 1994–present
- Television: Selling Houses Australia; Love It or List It Australia; Selling Houses Abroad
- Spouse: Caroline Winter
- Children: 3

Andrew T. Winter is an English-born real estate property expert, TV personality and author. He is known for presenting the British TV series Selling Houses and its Australian version Selling Houses Australia (2008–present).

== Career ==
Winter began his career as a real estate agent at the age of 17 in England.

He began hosting the British TV Series Selling Houses. Since moving to Australia in 2005, he began hosting programmes in Australia. Since 2008, he has hosted Selling Houses Australia. In 2014, he also hosted Inside Selling Houses Australia where he invited the cameras into his home.

Winter has released two property books: No-Nonsense Guide to Buying and Selling Property in December 2009 and Andrew Winter's Australian Real Estate Guide in August 2014.

In 2017, Winter co-hosted the Australian version of Canadian-based home design series Love It or List It alongside interior designer and The Block judge, Neale Whitaker.

== Personal life ==
Andrew Winter was born in London, England, but states that he was raised in the West Country of England.

In 2005, Winter along with his wife and three children moved to Australia. He lives on the Gold Coast, Queensland.

== Awards ==
Winter has won the ASTRA subscriber's choice award for Favourite Male Personality in 2010, 2011, 2012, 2013 and 2014. Winter was a nominee of the 2018 Gold Logie, as well as for the Logie Award for Most Popular Presenter. Winter's nomination also marks the first time that network Foxtel has received a gold logie.
