= List of programs broadcast by BBC Canada =

This is a list of programs that were broadcast on BBC Canada until the network's closure on December 31, 2020.

== Former programming ==
- 55 Degrees North
- Absolute Power
- According to Bex
- Afterlife
- Agent vs Agent
- Alan Carr: Chatty Man
- Alan Clark Diaries
- Ancestors in the Attic
- Antiques Roadshow
- Ashes to Ashes
- At the End Of My Leash
- Auf Wiedersehen Pet
- Bargain Hunt
- Beachcomber Cottage
- Beautiful People
- Big City Broker
- The Big Flip
- Blackadder
- The Body Farm
- Britain's Worst Driver
- Border Force
- Border Security (Australia)
- Build a New Life
- The Catherine Tate Show
- Celeb
- Celebrity Fantasy Homes
- Colin & Justin's Home Heist
- Come Fly With Me
- Conviction
- Coupling
- Countdown to Murder
- The Crouches
- Cutting It
- Dalziel and Pascoe
- Daniel Deronda
- Dead Ringers
- Death in Holy Orders
- Death in Paradise
- Debbie Travis’ Facelift
- Design Inc.
- Dragons' Den (UK)
- Dream Home Abroad
- EastEnders
- Escape to the Country
- The F Word
- The Fades
- Fantasy Homes by the Sea
- Fawlty Towers
- Find Me The Face
- The Fix
- Flog It!
- Free Agents
- Fresh and Wild
- Friday Night Dinner
- From Darkness
- Garden Invaders
- Gavin & Stacey
- The Graham Norton Show
- Hell's Kitchen (UK)
- Holiday Showdown
- Holmes Inspection
- Holmes Makes it Right
- Holmes on Homes
- Home To Stay
- Homes Under The Hammer
- The Hotel Inspector
- How Not to Live Your Life
- How the Other Half Live
- Ideal
- Inspector Lynley
- The Jonathan Ross Show
- Judge John Deed
- Junk Brothers
- Kitchen Nightmares
- The Kumars at No. 42
- The Lakes
- Law and Order: UK
- Life Laundry
- Life on Mars
- A Likeness in Stone
- Little Britain
- Little Britain Abroad
- Living The Dream
- Location, Location, Location
- Luther
- Make My Body Younger
- Manchild
- Mary Queen of Shops
- Mersey Beat
- Million Pound Property Experiment
- Misfits
- Monroe
- Neat
- The Omid Djalili Show
- The Other Boleyn Girl
- PA'S
- A Place to Call Home
- Property Virgins
- Put Your Money Where Your Mouth Is
- Ramsay's Best Restaurant
- Ramsay's Kitchen Nightmares
- Real Men
- Real Renos
- The Really Big Flip
- Restaurant Makeover
- Rich Bride, Poor Bride
- Robin Hood
- Room Rivals
- Room Service
- The Royal Bodyguard
- Scott & Bailey
- Servants
- Spa/Teen Spa
- Spooks
- State of Play
- Strange
- Swiss Toni
- Tamasin’s Weekends
- The Thin Blue Line
- This Small Space
- Til Debt Do Us Part
- TLC
- Top Gear
- Torchwood
- Total Wipeout
- A Town & Country Murder
- Trading Up In The Sun
- Two Pints of Lager and a Packet of Crisps
- The Unsellables
- The Unsellables (UK)
- Waking The Dead
- Wedding SOS
- Wei in Pass Me The Soap
- What Not to Wear
- The World's Toughest Driving Tests
- Would You Rather?

== See also ==
- List of programs broadcast by the BBC
- BBC Canada
- BBC
- List of programs broadcast by BBC America
