= List of international television series premieres on Australian television in 2008 =

This is a list of international television programs which first aired on Australian television in 2008. The list is arranged chronological order. Where more than one program debuted on the same date, those programs are listed alphabetically.

== Premieres ==
=== Free-to-air television ===
| Program | Network | Debut date |
|---|---|---|
| (United Kingdom) Skins | SBS TV | 7 January 2008 |
| (United States) Burn Notice | Network Ten | 15 January 2008 |
| (United States) My Friends Tigger & Pooh | Seven Network | 19 January 2008 |
| (United States) Samantha Who? | Seven Network | 3 February 2008 |
| (United Kingdom) A Year with the Royal Family | Nine Network | 4 February 2008 |
| (New Zealand) Milly, Molly | ABC1 | 4 February 2008 |
| (United Kingdom) Little Britain Abroad | ABC1 | 6 February 2008 |
| (United States) Kitchen Nightmares USA | Nine Network | 7 February 2008 |
| (United States) Suburban Secrets | Seven Network | 10 February 2008 |
| (United States) Dirty Sexy Money | Seven Network | 11 February 2008 |
| (United Kingdom) Legend of the Dragon | Network Ten | 12 February 2008 |
| (United States) Terminator: The Sarah Connor Chronicles | Nine Network | 12 February 2008 |
| (United States) Women's Murder Club | Network Ten | 12 February 2008 |
| (United States) Back to You | Network Ten | 13 February 2008 |
| (United Kingdom) Lewis | Seven Network | 13 February 2008 |
| (United States) Rules of Engagement | Network Ten | 13 February 2008 |
| (United Kingdom) Shrink Rap | ABC2 | 13 February 2008 |
| (United Kingdom) That Mitchell and Webb Look | ABC1 | 13 February 2008 |
| (United States) Me, Eloise! | ABC1 | 14 February 2008 |
| (Canada) / (United States) Viva Piñata | Network Ten | 14 February 2008 |
| (United Kingdom) Brat Camp | ABC1 | 19 February 2008 |
| (United States) Cashmere Mafia | Nine Network | 20 February 2008 |
| (Canada) / (United States) George of the Jungle (2007) | ABC1 | 25 February 2008 |
| (United Kingdom) IMP | ABC1 | 25 February 2008 |
| (Canada) Storm Hawks | ABC1 | 26 February 2008 |
| (United Kingdom) Frankenstein's Cat | ABC1 | 26 February 2008 |
| (Austria) Stockinger | SBS TV | 28 February 2008 |
| (United Kingdom) Jekyll | ABC1 | 2 March 2008 |
| (United States) Eureka | Ten HD | 6 March 2008 |
| (United States) Friday Night Lights | Ten HD | 7 March 2008 |
| (United Kingdom) Sinchronicity | SBS TV | 10 March 2008 |
| (United States) Conviction (Note: Conviction was originally scheduled to air on 23 January 2008 at 8:30 pm on Network Ten. But it was pulled off schedule and instead premiered on 11 March at 11:30 pm on Ten HD.) | Ten HD | 11 March 2008 |
| (United Kingdom) / (France) The Magic Roundabout (2006) | ABC1 | 11 March 2008 |
| (United States) The Moment of Truth | Nine Network | 11 March 2008 |
| (United Kingdom) / (United States) / (Canada) Finley the Fire Engine | ABC1 | 18 March 2008 |
| (United States) Invasion | Nine HD | 20 March 2008 |
| (United States) Related | Nine HD | 26 March 2008 |
| (United Kingdom) The Thick of It | ABC1 | 26 March 2008 |
| (New Zealand) Sparkle Friends | ABC1 | 3 April 2008 |
| (United States) Zoey 101 | ABC1 | 4 April 2008 |
| (United Kingdom) Michael Palin's New Europe (Note: Michael Palin's New Europe was axed after three episodes) | Seven Network | 5 April 2008 |
| (Canada) / (United States) Chaotic | Network Ten | 7 April 2008 |
| (Japan) Bakugan Battle Brawlers | Network Ten | 7 April 2008 |
| (Japan) Death Note | ABC2 | 14 April 2008 |
| (United Kingdom) Life in Cold Blood | Nine Network | 14 April 2008 |
| (Canada) Futz! | ABC1 | 14 April 2008 |
| (France) / (United Kingdom) Eliot Kid | ABC1 | 15 April 2008 |
| (United Kingdom) The Armstrong and Miller Show | ABC1 | 16 April 2008 |
| (United Kingdom) In the Night Garden... | ABC1 | 28 April 2008 |
| (United Kingdom) Mistresses | Seven Network | 29 April 2008 |
| (United Kingdom) The Palace | Seven Network | 29 April 2008 |
| (United Kingdom) The State Within | ABC1 | 1 May 2008 |
| (United States) How to Look Good Naked | Network Ten | 5 May 2008 |
| (United States) / (Canada) Edgar and Ellen (TV series) | ABC1 | 6 May 2008 |
| (United States) Flight of the Conchords | Network Ten | 11 May 2008 |
| (United States) Horseland | Network Ten | 12 May 2008 |
| (United Kingdom) Tiger: Spy in the Jungle | Nine Network | 19 May 2008 |
| (United States) Cavemen | Seven Network | 28 May 2008 |
| (United Kingdom) Echo Beach | ABC2 | 30 May 2008 |
| (United Kingdom) Moving Wallpaper | ABC2 | 30 May 2008 |
| (United Kingdom) Jane Austen FourPlay | ABC1 | 1 June 2008 |
| (New Zealand) Renters | Seven Network | 3 June 2008 |
| (United Kingdom) The Gil Mayo Mysteries | ABC1 | 12 June 2008 |
| (United States) WWE After Burn | Nine Network | 15 June 2008 |
| (France) Spiral | SBS TV | 19 June 2008 |
| (United States) Phineas and Ferb | Seven Network | 21 June 2008 |
| (Australia) / (New Zealand) / (Singapore) Master Raindrop | Seven Network | 21 June 2008 |
| (United States) Lipstick Jungle | Seven Network | 29 June 2008 |
| (United States) Private Practice | Seven Network | 29 June 2008 |
| (United Kingdom) The Peter Serafinowicz Show | ABC2 | 3 July 2008 |
| (United Kingdom) Boiling Point | Seven Network | 8 July 2008 |
| (United Kingdom) How to Have Sex After Marriage | Nine Network | 8 July 2008 |
| (United States) Wipeout | Nine Network | 8 July 2008 |
| (United Kingdom) / (United States) The Mr. Men Show | ABC1 | 17 July 2008 |
| (United States) Shaggy & Scooby-Doo Get a Clue! | Nine Network | 19 July 2008 |
| (United States) Twenty Good Years | Nine HD | 24 July 2008 |
| (United Kingdom) Rupert Bear, Follow the Magic... | ABC2 | 1 August 2008 |
| (United Kingdom) Roary the Racing Car | ABC1 | 1 August 2008 |
| (United Kingdom) Freezing | ABC1 | 6 August 2008 |
| (United States) Transformers: Animated | Network Ten | 11 August 2008 |
| (Australia) / (Spain) Classic Tales | ABC1 | 12 August 2008 |
| (Canada) / (Australia) G2G | Nine Network | 16 August 2008 |
| (United Kingdom) Beyond Boiling Point | Seven Network | 27 August 2008 |
| (United Kingdom) The Large Family | ABC1 | 28 August 2008 |
| (United States) / (Canada) Yin Yang Yo! | Seven Network | 31 August 2008 |
| (United Kingdom) Secret Diary of a Call Girl | Nine Network | 2 September 2008 |
| (United States) 90210 | Network Ten | 8 September 2008 |
| (Canada) Best Ed | ABC1 | 9 September 2008 |
| (United States) Fringe | Nine Network | 17 September 2008 |
| (United States) Justice League Unlimited | Nine Network | 22 September 2008 |
| (United States) / (South Korea) / (Spain) Eon Kid | Network Ten | 23 September 2008 |
| (United States) Camp Lazlo | Nine Network | 27 September 2008 |
| (United States) The Mentalist | Nine Network | 5 October 2008 |
| (Canada) Jibber Jabber | ABC1 | 6 October 2008 |
| (United States) Studio 60 on the Sunset Strip | Nine HD | 9 October 2008 |
| (United Kingdom) Soundtrack to My Life | ABC2 | 10 October 2008 |
| (United Kingdom) Rough Diamond | ABC1 | 11 October 2008 |
| (United States) Kath & Kim | Seven Network | 12 October 2008 |
| (United Kingdom) M.I. High | ABC1 | 13 October 2008 |
| (United Kingdom) Sleep Clinic | ABC2 | 15 October 2008 |
| (United Kingdom) Dork Hunters from Outer Space | Network Ten | 20 October 2008 |
| (Canada) Kid vs. Kat | ABC1 | 23 October 2008 |
| (France) The Owl | ABC1 | 27 October 2008 |
| (United States) The Spectacular Spider-Man | Network Ten | 6 November 2008 |
| (United States) Xiaolin Showdown | Nine HD | 11 November 2008 |
| (France) A Kind of Magic | ABC1 | 11 November 2008 |
| (United Kingdom) Zoo Days | ABC2 | 17 November 2008 |
| (United States) Star Wars: The Clone Wars | Network Ten | 22 November 2008 |
| (Australia) / (Canada) Dex Hamilton: Alien Entomologist | Network Ten | 22 November 2008 |
| (United Kingdom) Modern Toss | ABC2 | 27 November 2008 |
| (United Kingdom) HolbyBlue | Seven Network | 30 November 2008 |
| (United Kingdom) It's Adam and Shelley | ABC2 | 1 December 2008 |
| (United States) Army Wives (Note: Army Wives was axed after six episodes) | Network Ten | 1 December 2008 |
| (United States) The Ex List | Network Ten | 1 December 2008 |
| (United States) Eli Stone | Seven Network | 2 December 2008 |
| (United Kingdom) Party Animals | ABC1 | 2 December 2008 |
| (United Kingdom) Long Way Down | SBS TV | 3 December 2008 |
| (Austria) / (Germany) Rex in Rome | SBS TV | 4 December 2008 |
| (United States) Wall Street Warriors | SBS TV | 5 December 2008 |
| (United Kingdom) Britannia High (Note: Britannia High was axed after one episode) | Seven Network | 6 December 2008 |
| (United States) Dance Machine | Seven Network | 6 December 2008 |
| (United States) / (United Kingdom) Olivia | ABC1 | 8 December 2008 |
| (United States) In Plain Sight | Network Ten | 9 December 2008 |
| (United Kingdom) Humf | ABC1 | 15 December 2008 |
| (United Kingdom) The Family | Network Ten | 20 December 2008 |
| (France) Ralf the Record Rat | ABC1 | 20 December 2008 |
| (Canada) / (Australia) Zeke's Pad | Seven Network | 26 December 2008 |
| (France) / (Italy) Blanche | ABC TV | 2008 |

=== Subscription television ===
| Program | Network | Debut date |
|---|---|---|
| (United States) The Real Housewives of Orange County | Arena | 1 January 2008 |
| (United Kingdom) The Friday Night Project | UK.TV | 2 January 2008 |
| (United States) Gotti's Way | MTV | 3 January 2008 |
| (United Kingdom) Trinny & Susannah Undress the Nation | The LifeStyle Channel | 8 January |
| (United Kingdom) Matt James Eco Eden | The LifeStyle Channel | 11 January |
| (United States) I Love New York | VH1 | 12 January 2008 |
| (United Kingdom) Rick Stein's Mediterranean Escape | The LifeStyle Channel | 13 January |
| (United Kingdom) Saxondale | UKTV | 14 January |
| (United States) Snoop Dogg's Father Hood | E! | 15 January 2008 |
| (United States) Phineas and Ferb | Disney Channel | 1 February |
| (United Kingdom) The Bulls**t Detective | The LifeStyle Channel | 2 February |
| (United Kingdom) Outrageous Wasters | The LifeStyle Channel | 11 February |
| (United Kingdom) Baby Ballroom: The Championship | The LifeStyle Channel | 16 February |
| (United Kingdom) The Duchess | The LifeStyle Channel | 21 February |
| (United Kingdom) Jamie's Great Italian Escape | The LifeStyle Channel | 21 February |
| (United Kingdom) Escape | The LifeStyle Channel | 25 February |
| (United States) Murder | Fox8 | 25 February 2008 |
| (United Kingdom) Living on the Edge | MTV | March |
| (United Kingdom) Jimmy's Farm | The LifeStyle Channel | 2 March |
| (United Kingdom) Colin & Justin's Home Heist | The LifeStyle Channel | 3 March |
| (United States) Hey Paula | Arena | 4 March 2008 |
| (United Kingdom) Put Your Money Where Your Mouth Is | The LifeStyle Channel | 10 March |
| (United Kingdom) Cook Yourself Thin | The LifeStyle Channel | 14 March |
| (United Kingdom) River Cops | The LifeStyle Channel | 16 March |
| (United Kingdom) Make or Break | UK.TV | 19 March 2008 |
| (United Kingdom) Dating the Enemy | The LifeStyle Channel | 21 March |
| (United Kingdom) Open House | The LifeStyle Channel | 24 March |
| (United States) John from Cincinnati | Showcase | 21 April 2008 |
| (United States) The Price Is Right | W. | 5 May 2008 |
| (United States) Tim Gunn's Guide to Style | Arena | 6 May 2008 |
| (United Kingdom) Make Your Child Brilliant | The LifeStyle Channel | 12 May |
| (United States) The Black Donnellys | Showcase | 15 May 2008 |
| (United Kingdom) Benidorm | UKTV | 19 May |
| (United Kingdom) Arrange Me a Marriage | The LifeStyle Channel | 20 May |
| (United States) Kathy Griffin: My Life on the D-List | Arena | 29 May 2008 |
| (Singapore) The Contender: Muay Thai | Fox8 | 5 June 2008 |
| (United Kingdom) Risky Business | The LifeStyle Channel | 6 June |
| (United States) Living Lohan | E! | 8 June 2008 |
| (United States) Denise Richards: It's Complicated | E! | 8 June 2008 |
| (United States) ego trip's Miss Rap Supreme | MTV | 18 June 2008 |
| (United Kingdom) Secret Millionaire | The LifeStyle Channel | 23 June |
| (United States) Charm School | VH1 | 26 June 2008 |
| (Canada) Durham County | showcase | 1 July 2008 |
| (United States) Millionaire Matchmaker | Arena | 1 July 2008 |
| (United States) Striker | National Geographic HD | 1 July 2008 |
| (United Kingdom) The Truth About Property | The LifeStyle Channel | 2 July 2008 |
| (United Kingdom) The Apprentice | UK.TV | 2 July 2008 |
| (United States) Hippo: Africa's River Beast | National Geographic HD | 7 July 2008 |
| (United Kingdom) Famous 5: On the Case | Disney Channel | 11 July |
| (United Kingdom) Build a New Life | The LifeStyle Channel | 14 July |
| (United States) Predators in Peril | National Geographic HD | 15 July 2008 |
| (Canada) Blood Ties | Fox8 | 22 July |
| (United Kingdom) Don't Tell The Bride | The LifeStyle Channel | 23 July |
| (United Kingdom) Living with Modernism | The LifeStyle Channel | 25 July |
| (Canada) The Best Years | Fox8 | 22 July 2008 |
| (Canada) Blood Ties | Fox8 | 22 July 2008 |
| (United Kingdom) The Life and Times of Vivienne Vyle | UKTV | 28 July 2008 |
| (United States) Wildlife Photographers | National Geographic HD | 29 July 2008 |
| (United Kingdom) Celebrity Wife Swap | The LifeStyle Channel | 4 August |
| (United States) Celebrity Rehab with Dr. Drew | bio. | 4 August 2008 |
| (United States) Welcome to the Parker | Arena | 5 August 2008 |
| (United Kingdom) Good Bid Good Buy | The LifeStyle Channel | 6 August |
| (United Kingdom) To the Manor Bowen | The LifeStyle Channel | 26 August |
| (United States) Breaking Bad | Showcase | 28 August 2008 |
| (Japan) Bobobo-bo Bo-bobo | Cartoon Network | 1 September 2008 |
| (United States) The Real Housewives of New York City | Arena | 1 September 2008 |
| (United Kingdom) Twenty Thousand Streets Under the Sky | BBC HD | 1 September 2008 |
| (United States) Pam: Girl on the Loose | E! | 2 September 2008 |
| (United Kingdom) Man vs. Wild | Discovery Channel | 3 September 2008 |
| (United Kingdom) Sorted | BBC HD | 3 September 2008 |
| (United States) Brooke Knows Best | MTV | 5 September 2008 |
| (United Kingdom) Jamie at Home | LifeStyle Food | 6 September 2008 |
| (United States) The Dresden Files | Sci Fi Channel | 8 September 2008 |
| (United Kingdom) Messiah | Showcase | 8 September 2008 |
| (United States) First Class All the Way | Arena | 16 September 2008 |
| (United States) Real Time with Bill Maher | The Comedy Channel | 18 September 2008 |
| (United States) Greek | Fox8 | 18 September 2008 |
| (Canada) Ice Road Truckers | Fox8 | 22 September 2008 |
| (United States) The Mighty B! | Cartoon Network | 24 September 2008 |
| (United Kingdom) After You've Gone | UKTV | 7 September |
| (United Kingdom) Lark Rise to Candleford | BBC HD and UKTV | 25 September 2008 |
| (United States) In Treatment | Showcase | 29 September 2008 |
| (United States) The Bachelorette | Arena | October 2008 |
| (United States) Old Skool with Terry and Gita | Bio. | 1 October 2008 |
| (United States) 30-Second Bunnies Theatre | Movie Extra | 8 October 2008 |
| (United States) John Adams | Showcase | 14 October 2008 |
| (Canada) The Unsellables | The LifeStyle Channel | 17 October |
| (United Kingdom) Don't Move, Improve | The LifeStyle Channel | 22 October |
| (United Kingdom) Savile Row | The LifeStyle Channel | 26 October |
| (United Kingdom) Dumped | The LifeStyle Channel | 27 October |
| (United States) Girl Meets Cowboy | Arena | 28 October 2008 |
| (United States) Victoria Silvstedt: My Perfect Life | E! | 28 October 2008 |
| (United Kingdom) The Sarah Jane Adventures | Nickelodeon | 31 October 2008 |
| (New Zealand) Wa$ted! | The LifeStyle Channel | 8 November |
| (United States) Gemini Division | Sci Fi Channel | 3 November 2008 |
| (United States) Top Design | Arena | 3 November 2008 |
| (United States) The Rachel Zoe Project | Arena | 4 November 2008 |
| (United Kingdom) My Life for Sale | The LifeStyle Channel | 9 November |
| (United States) The Kill Point | Movie Extra | 23 November 2008 |
| (United Kingdom) Supersize vs Superskinny | The LifeStyle Channel | 24 November |
| (United States) I Want to Work for Diddy | MTV | 4 December 2008 |
| (United States) Step It Up and Dance | Arena | 7 December 2008 |
| (United States) America's Most Smartest Model | MTV | 8 December 2008 |
| (United States) Legally Blonde – The Musical: The Search for Elle Woods | MTV | 15 December |
| (United States) Instant Beauty Pageant | Arena | 9 December 2008 |
| (United States) America's Toughest Jobs | Unknown | Unknown |
| (United States) Do Not Disturb (Note: Do Not Disturb was previously known as The Inn) | Unknown | Unknown |
| (United States) Flipping Out | Arena | Unknown |
| (United States) Million Dollar Listing | Arena | Unknown |
| (United States) Spain... on the Road Again | The LifeStyle Channel | Unknown |
| (United States) Top Chef | Arena | Unknown |
| (United States) The Ultimate School Musical | Unknown | Unknown |
| (United States) Unhitched | Unknown | Unknown |
