= The Unsellables =

The Unsellables may refer to:

- The Unsellables (Canadian TV series), a reality series that debuted in 2009, focused on helping people sell their houses
- The Unsellables (British TV series), a 2009 adaptation of the Canadian show
