= Location =

Point or an area on Earth's surface or elsewhere

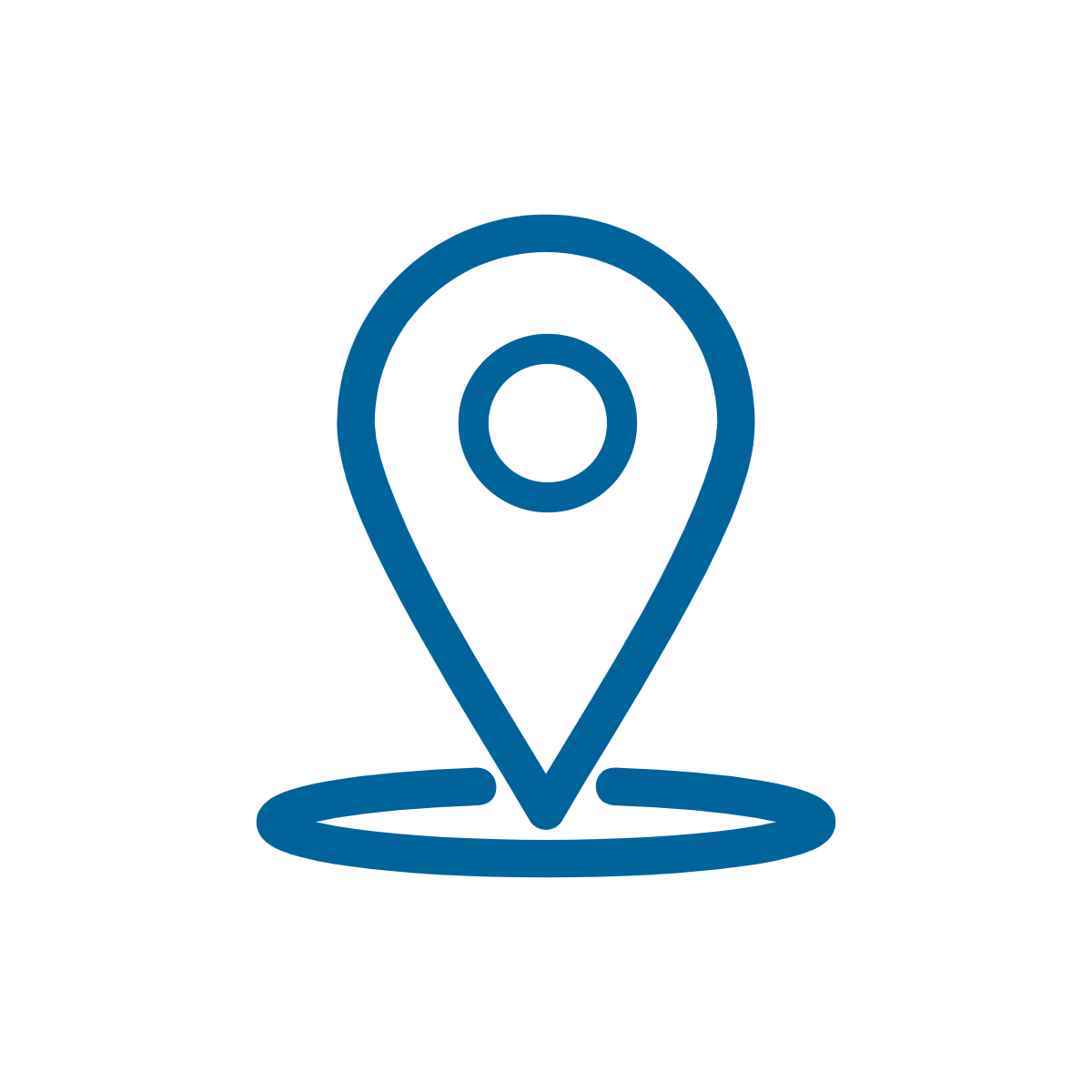
An icon representing the concept of location

In geography, location or place is used to denote a region (point, line, or area) on Earth's surface. The term location generally implies a higher degree of certainty than place, the latter often indicating an entity with an ambiguous boundary, relying more on human or social attributes of place identity and sense of place than on geometry. A populated place is called a settlement.

== Types ==
=== Locality ===
A locality, settlement, or populated place is likely to have a well-defined name but a boundary that is not well defined, but rather varies by context. London, for instance, has a legal boundary, but this is unlikely to completely match with general usage. An area within a town, such as Covent Garden in London, also almost always has some ambiguity as to its extent. In geography, location is considered to be more precise than "place".

=== Relative location ===
A relative location, or situation, is described as a displacement from another site.

=== Absolute location ===
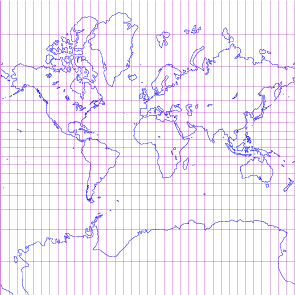
Gridlines on the Mercator projection

An absolute location can be designated using a specific pairing of latitude and longitude in a Cartesian coordinate grid (for example, a spherical coordinate system or an ellipsoid-based system such as the World Geodetic System) or similar methods. For example, the position of New York City in the United States can be expressed using the coordinate system as the location 40.7128°N (latitude), 74.0060°W ( Absolute locations are also relative locations, since even absolute locations are expressed relative to something else. For example, longitude is the number of degrees east or west of the Prime Meridian, a line arbitrarily chosen to pass through Greenwich, England. Similarly, latitude is the number of degrees north or south of the equator. Because latitude and longitude are expressed relative to these lines, a position expressed in latitude and longitude is also a relative location.

== See also ==
- Geocode – Code that represents a geographic entity (location or object)
- Geographical feature – Discrete phenomenon that exists at a location on Earth
- Geographic coordinate system – System to specify locations on Earth
- Geopositioning – Determination of the geographic position of an object
- Global Positioning System (GPS) – American satellite-based radio navigation service
- Locale (geographic)
- Location, Location, Location
- Location Location Location Australia
