= Sofie Allsopp =

British television presenter

The Honourable Sofie Allsopp
- Born: Sophia Atherley Allsopp; 1980 (age 45–46); Wiltshire, England
- Occupation: Television presenter
- Years active: 2006–present
- Spouse: Robert Fletcher
- Children: 1
- Father: Charles Allsopp, 6th Baron Hindlip
- Relatives: Kirstie Allsopp (sister); Cath Kidston (cousin)

Sophia Atherley "Sofie" Allsopp (born 1980) is a British television presenter.

== Early life ==
Her parents are Charles Allsopp, 6th Baron Hindlip and Fiona Victoria Jean Atherley (née McGowan). She is the younger sister of television presenter Kirstie Allsopp. Designer and businesswoman Cath Kidston is her cousin.

== Career ==
Allsopp has worked as a real-estate agent, a sales and letting negotiator and a relocation agent in Notting Hill, London. She had her own company, specialising in finding houses, managing moves and providing after-sale services to new home-owners.

In 2006, she temporarily replaced her sister Kirstie as co-presenter of Location, Location, Location, while the latter was on maternity leave. During this period, she presented an episode in which Hackney was voted as the worst place to live in the UK, which caused some controversy.

In 2008, she began hosting the Canadian television show The Unsellables on HGTV (Canada). Her role on the show was to help people sell their "unsellable" homes. The programme has since been broadcast on the U.S. HGTV and on the BBC in the UK, in which Allsopp is paired with property expert John Rennie.

== Personal life ==
She has a degree in Medieval History from the University of Edinburgh.

== Filmography ==
Year	Title	Role	Notes
2010	This Morning	Herself	
2009	The Unsellables (Canada)	Herself	Presenter
2009	The Unsellables (UK)	Herself	Presenter
2006	National Television Awards	Herself	Presenter
