= Sarah Beeny's New Life in the Country =

British television documentary program

- Genre: Documentary
- Directed by: Jonathan Profaska
- Country of origin: United Kingdom
- Original language: English
- No. of series: 4
- No. of episodes: 32

Production
- Executive producer: Guy Gilbert
- Producer: Jonathan Profaska
- Running time: 48 minutes

Original release
- Network: Channel 4
- Release: 11 November 2020 – 22 February 2025

Sarah Beeny's New Life in the Country is a British television series, first shown in 2020, which showed property developer Sarah Beeny and her family's move to Somerset from London, including building their dream home and adapting to country life.

A second series began in November 2021, showing the fitting out and decoration of the interior of their new home, and improvements such as hedge restoration and tree planting to the surrounding land.

A third series began in April 2023, with a fourth series airing from 2025.

== Premise ==
Sarah Beeny and her husband, artist Graham Swift decided to sell up their London home as well as their stately home wedding business, Rise Hall and move to a former 220 acre farm near Bruton. The farm had permission to build a new house, but Beeny and Swift wanted to build a mini stately home in a different field that planning permission had been granted for.

== Controversy ==
The first series had several controversies, such as Beeny keeping a wild rabbit that their cat had caught as a pet. The programme was criticised as being out of touch during the COVID-19 pandemic. The property was given planning permission even though there was local opposition to the development.

== Episodes ==
=== Series 1 (2020) ===
| No. overall | No. in season | Directed by | Original release date | U.K. viewers (millions) |
|---|---|---|---|---|
| 1 | 1 | Jonathan Profaska | 11 November 2020 | 2.053 |
| 2 | 2 | Jonathan Profaska | 18 November 2020 | 1.812 |
| 3 | 3 | Jonathan Profaska | 25 November 2020 | 1.933 |
| 4 | 4 | Jonathan Profaska | 2 December 2020 | 1.764 |
| 5 | 5 | Jonathan Profaska | 9 December 2020 | 1.835 |
| 6 | 6 | Jonathan Profaska | 16 December 2020 | 1.758 |
| 7 | 7 | Jonathan Profaska | 22 December 2020 | 2.120 |
| 8 | 8 | Jonathan Profaska | 29 December 2020 | N/A |

=== Series 2 (2021-2022) ===
| No. overall | No. in season | Directed by | Original release date | U.K. viewers (millions) |
|---|---|---|---|---|
| 9 | 1 | Jonathan Profaska | 30 November 2021 | N/A |
| 10 | 2 | Jonathan Profaska | 7 December 2021 | N/A |
| 11 | 3 | Jonathan Profaska | 14 December 2021 | N/A |
| 12 | Christmas–Special | Jonathan Profaska | 21 December 2021 | N/A |
| 13 | 4 | Jonathan Profaska | 28 December 2021 | N/A |
| 14 | 5 | Jonathan Profaska | 4 January 2022 | N/A |
| 15 | 6 | Jonathan Profaska | 11 January 2022 | N/A |
| 16 | 7 | Jonathan Profaska | 18 January 2022 | N/A |
| 17 | 8 | Jonathan Profaska | 25 January 2022 | N/A |
