= Phil Spencer (television personality) =

British television personality

Phil Spencer MBE
- Spencer filming in Stoke-on-Trent, July 2007
- Born: Philip John Edward Spencer; 11 December 1969 (age 56); Littlebourne, Kent, England
- Occupations: TV presenter businessman journalist
- Years active: 2000–present
- Employer: Channel 4
- Notable credit(s): Location, Location, Location; Relocation, Relocation; Phil Spencer: Secret Agent; Love It or List It
- Spouse: Fiona Spencer
- Children: 2
- Relatives: Harry Spencer (grandfather)
- Website: https://www.moveiq.co.uk

Philip John Edward Spencer (born 11 December 1969) is an English media personality, television presenter, and journalist, best known as the co-presenter of Channel 4 property show Location, Location, Location along with its spin-off Relocation, Relocation between 2004 and 2011 alongside Kirstie Allsopp.

== Early life and education ==
Philip John Edward Spencer grew up in Littlebourne, Kent, son of Richard (David) Edward Spencer and Anne, née Saville-Peck, of Garrington Farm, Littlebourne. His father had studied engineering at Loughborough University, and his mother, daughter of a GP, was a teacher. His grandfather was the bank manager and first-class cricketer Harry Spencer. He was educated at Uppingham School, a co-educational independent school in the small market town of Uppingham, Rutland, in the Midlands, where he was Head Boy.

Spencer studied a four-year Surveying degree at London Southbank University.

== Business career ==
Having studied as a surveyor in the early 1990s, Spencer decided that there was a lack of professional support available for buyers, and set himself up as a home finder. He founded property search company Garrington Home Finders Ltd in 1996. He describes himself as not the first to see this opportunity, "but I was probably second or third, and Kirstie [Allsopp] was the fourth." The company entered into administration in early 2009.

Spencer remains an active property investor and landlord. He launched the website Move iQ in 2018 to support buyers and renters in the UK property market, and tenants in the UK.

== Media career ==
Spencer is the co-presenter of Channel 4 property show Location, Location, Location along with its spin-off Relocation, Relocation between 2004 and 2011, alongside Kirstie Allsopp.

In early 2010, Spencer partnered with co-host Allsopp and launched a new independent production company called Raise the Roof with colleagues from IWC Media. Spencer is a director and shareholder.

In April 2010, his book Adding Value to Your Home was published.

In 2013, Spencer hosted the daytime game show The Common Denominator, on Channel 4.

== Personal life ==
Spencer lives in Hampshire with his Australian wife Fiona and their two sons.

He is an ambassador for SOS Children's Villages. He is also a patron of St Mungo's, a London homelessness charity, and a supporter of the Countryside Alliance.

In August 2014, Spencer was one of 200 public figures who were signatories to a letter to The Guardian opposing Scottish independence in the run-up to the 2014 referendum on that issue.

In August 2023, Spencer's parents were killed in a car accident in Kent; their estate of £18 million was left to their four children.

He was appointed Member of the Order of the British Empire (MBE) in the 2026 New Year Honours for charitable service.

== Bibliography ==
- Spencer, Phil (2004). How to Buy a House. Vermilion. ISBN 978-0718147341.
- Spencer, Phil (2010). Adding Value to Your Home. Vermilion.
- Spencer, Phil (2011). How to Buy Your First Home. Vermilion.
