= List of programs broadcast by BBC America =

The following is a list of television programs currently or formerly broadcast by BBC America.

== Current programming ==
=== Acquired programming ===
- The Graham Norton Show (2007)

== Former programming ==
=== Drama ===
- Copper (2012–13)
- Orphan Black (2013–17)
- Fleming: The Man Who Would Be Bond (2014)
- Intruders (2014)
- Dirk Gently's Holistic Detective Agency (2016–17)
- Killing Eve (2018–22)
- The Watch (2021)
- The Split (season 3) (2022; moved from Sundance TV)
- Orphan Black: Echoes (2024)

=== Comedy ===
- Almost Royal (2014–16)
- Ten Percent (2022)

=== Unscripted ===
==== Docuseries ====
- Meerkat Manor: Rise of the Dynasty (2021)
- Africa's Wild Year (2022)

==== Reality ====
- No Kitchen Required (2012)
- Richard Hammond's Crash Course (2012)
- Gizmodo: The Gadget Testers (2013)
- Mud, Sweat & Gears (2015)

==== Variety ====
- Factomania (2014)
- Top Gear America (season 1) (2017; moved to MotorTrend+)

== Syndicated programming ==
=== A ===
- Absolutely Fabulous (1998–2013; 2016)
- The Accidental Angler (2007–11)
- Africa (2013)
- Africa's Wild Year (2022)
- After Henry (1998–2006)
- After You've Gone (2007–10; 2014)
- Agatha Christie's Poirot (1998–2012; 2014–17)
- Airport (1998–2009; 2012–13)
- Alan Davies' Teenage Revolution (2011–14)
- Alas Smith and Jones (1998–2008)
- Alexei Sayle's Stuff (1998–2008)
- Alistair McGowan's Big Impression (2000–06)
- All Creatures Great and Small (1998–2007)
- 'Allo 'Allo! (1998–2007)
- Almost Royal (2014–16)
- Angels (1998–2008)
- Animal Park (2000–19)
- Antiques Roadshow (2012–18)
- Any Dream Will Do (2007–15)
- The Apprentice (2005–17)
- Are You Being Served? (1998–2008)
- The Armstrong and Miller Show (2008–13; 2014–15)
- As Time Goes By (1998–2007)
- Atlantic: The Wildest Ocean on Earth (2015)
- Attenborough's Global Adventure (2022)
- Attenborough in Paradise (1996)
- The Avengers (1998–2007)

=== B ===
- Baby Chimp Rescue (2020)
- Backup (1998–2008)
- Ballet Shoes (1998–2006)
- Bargain Hunt (2007–19)
- BBC World News (1999–2019)
- BBC World News America (1999–2019)
- Beast (2000–07)
- Bedlam (2012–16)
- Being Human (2009–13)
- Bellamy's People (2010–14)
- Ben Elton: The Man from Auntie (2001–09; 2013)
- The Ben Elton Show (1998–99; 2010–14)
- The Benny Hill Show (1998–2006)
- Bergerac (1998–2008)
- The Best of Tommy Cooper (1998–2005)
- Big Cats (2018)
- Big Deal (1998–2004)
- Big Train (1999–2009)
- Bill Hicks: One Night Stand (1998–99; 2014)
- Black Books (2001–14)
- Blackadder (1998–2008)
- Blake's 7 (1998–2005)
- Blandings (2013–16)
- The Blue Planet (2001)
- Blue Planet II (2018)
- The Bob Monkhouse Show (1998–2005)
- Bones
- Bottom (1998–2011)
- Bottom Live 2001: An Arse Oddity (2002; 2014–15)
- Bottom Live (1998–2013)
- Bravestarr (1998–2004)
- Bread (1998–2008)
- Britain's Missing Top Model (2010–18)
- The Brittas Empire (1998–2005)
- Broadchurch (2014–19)
- Bromwell High (2005–13)
- Bullseye (1998–2003)
- Burn Notice (2011–17)
- Butterflies (1998–2004)

=== C ===
- Campion (1998–2008)
- Canterbury Tales (2004–11)
- The Catherine Tate Show (2005–17)
- Carrott Confidential (1998–2005)
- Carrott's Lib (1998–2005)
- Carry On Laughing (1998–2004)
- Cash in the Attic (2007–20)
- Casualty (1998–2019)
- Catherine Tate's Nan (2010–17)
- Celebrity Masterchef (2010–18)
- Celebrity Masterchef USA (2013–18)
- Changing Rooms (1998–2009)
- Chasing the Rains (2023)
- Chef! (1998–2005)
- The Chinese Detective (1998–2006)
- The Choir (2007–15)
- Citizen Khan (2012–18)
- Citizen Smith (1998–2005)
- Class (2017–19)
- The Closer (2016–17)
- Cold Case (2008–13)
- Cold Feet (1998–2010)
- Colditz (1998–2004)
- Come Dine with Me (2013–19)
- Come Fly with Me (2011–16)
- Comedy Connections (2003–09)
- The Comedy Genius of John Sullivan (2012–13; 2016)
- Comic Roots (1998–2004)
- Commercial Breakdown (1998–2011)
- Coupling (2001–09)
- Cowboys (1998–2004)
- Cracker (1998–2011)
- Creature Comforts (2004–14)
- Criptales (2020)
- CSI: Miami (2010–18)

=== D ===
- Dad's Army (1998–2009)
- Dangerfield (1998–2008)
- Dave's One Night Stand (2011–14)
- David Attenborough's Natural Curiosities (2014–17)
- Demons (2014–19)
- The Detectives (1998–2008)
- The Dick Emery Show (1998–2010)
- dinnerladies (1999–2005)
- A Discovery of Witches (2019)
- DIY SOS (2000–19)
- Dog Eat Dog (2007–13)
- Don't Tell the Bride (2012–18)
- Doctor Who (2009–22)
- Dragons' Den (2005–19)
- Dynasties (2018–20)

=== E ===
- Early Doors (2003–13)
- EastEnders (1998–2003; 2013–19)
- Escape to the Country (2008–19)
- Ever Decreasing Circles (1998–2008)
- Extras (2005–09)

=== F ===
- The Fades (2012–16)
- The Fast Show (1998–2008)
- Father Ted (1998–2009)
- Fawlty Towers (1998–2008)
- Filthy, Rich and Catflap (1998–2008)
- First of the Summer Wine (1998–2006)
- Frank Stubbs Promotes (1998–99; 2009)
- Friday Night Dinner (2012–18)
- Friday Night with Jonathan Ross (2001–17)
- Frozen Planet II (2023)
- Funny as Hell (2010–19)

=== G ===
- Game On (1998–2009)
- Garden Rivals (2004–18)
- Gavin & Stacey (2008–17)
- Getting On (2009–14)
- Goodness Gracious Me (1998–2009)
- Gordon Ramsay's F Word (2014–19)
- Grange Hill (1998–2009; 2011)
- The Green Green Grass (2005–12)
- The Good Life (1998–2008)
- Great Bear Stakeout (2013)
- Ground Force America (2000–19)
- Ground Force (1999–2019)

=== H ===
- Hamish Macbeth (1998–2005)
- Happy Valley (2023)
- Harry Enfield and Chums (1998–2009)
- Have I Got News for You (1998–2018)
- Hex (2006–07; 2013–19)
- Hidden Kingdoms (2014)
- Hi-De-Hi! (1998–2010)
- Holby City (1999–2019)
- Holiday Showdown (2004–12)
- Hotel Babylon (2007–13)
- The Hour (2012–15)
- House of Fools (2014–17)
- How Clean Is Your House? (2004–12)
- The Hunt (2015)

=== I ===
- I'd Do Anything (2009–10; 2016–18)
- I'm Alan Partridge (1998–2009)
- The Inbetweeners (2010–16)
- Inspector Morse (1998–2009)

=== J ===
- Jack Dee's Happy Hour (2000–04; 2011; 2014)
- Jaguar's: Brazil's Super Cats (2016)
- Jam (2001–07)
- James May at the Edge of Space (2009–14)
- James May on the Moon (2010–13)
- James May's Toy Stories (2005–17)
- Jeeves and Wooster (1998–2008)
- Jekyll (2011–12)
- Jonathan Creek (1998–2018)
- Josh (2016–19)
- Just for Laughs (2012–17)
- Just Good Friends (1998–2009)

=== K ===
- Ken Dodd's World of Laughter (1998–2005)
- A Kick Up the Eighties (1998–2006)
- Keeping Up Appearances (1998–2009)
- Kingdom (2026)
- Kinsey (1998–2006)
- Kitchen Nightmares (2010–19)
- The Kit Curran Radio Show (2001–07)
- The Kumars at No. 42 (2002–11)

=== L ===
- A Life of Grime (2000–11)
- Last of The Summer Wine (1998–2012)
- Law & Order: Criminal Intent (2012–21)
- Law & Order: UK (2009–17)
- Law & Order
- The League of Gentlemen (1999–2006)
- The Lenny Henry Show (1998–2013)
- Let Them Eat Cake (1999–2005)
- The Life of Rock with Brian Pern (2014–18)
- Life Without George (1998–2007)
- The Likely Lads (1998–2008)
- Limmy's Show (2010–16)
- Linda Green (2002–06)
- Little Britain (2004–17)
- Live at the Apollo (2004–19)
- London's Burning (1998–2007)
- Look Around You (2003–08)
- Lovejoy (1998–2007)
- Lucky Feller (1998–2009)

=== M ===
- Madagascar (2011)
- The Making of Me (2010)
- Mammals (2024)
- Man vs. Wild (2015–16)
- Manchild (2013–16)
- Men Behaving Badly (1998–2009)
- Miranda (2010–17)
- Monarch of the Glen (1998–2009)
- Monkey Planet (2014)
- Monty Python's Flying Circus
- Mood (2022)
- Morgana Robinson's The Agency (2016–18)
- Mrs Brown's Boys (2011–19)
- Murphy's Law (2005–14)
- My Family (2000–09)
- My Hero (2000–09)
- My Life Is Murder (2024)

=== N ===
- Nanny (1998–2007)
- Nathan Barley (2006–09)
- Nature's Weirdest Events (2013–17)
- Neighbours (1998–2008)
- The New Statesman (1998–2007)
- Nighty Night (2004–12)
- Not Going Out (2006–19)
- Not the Nine O'Clock News (1998–2008)
- Nurse (2015–17)

=== O ===
- The Office (2001–16)
- Oh, Brother! (1998–2008)
- The Old Guys (2009–12; 2015)
- On Thin Ice (2009–12)
- One Foot in the Grave (1998–2008)
- Only Fools and Horses (1998–2015)
- Open All Hours (1998–2009)
- Operation Arctic (2014)
- Operation Good Guys (1998–2002; 2006–07)
- Operation Snow Tiger (2013)
- Outnumbered (2007–18)

=== P ===
- Parkinson (1998–2008)
- Peep Show (2006–14)
- Penguins: Spy In The Huddle (2013)
- A Perfect Planet (2021)
- The Persuaders! (1998–2008)
- Pie in the Sky (1998–2007)
- The Piglet Files (1998–2008)
- Planet Earth (2006)
- Planet Earth II (2017)
- Planet Earth III (2023)
- Planet Earth: Asia (2025)
- Poldark (1998–2006)
- Porridge (1998–2009)
- Pramface (2012–16)
- Predator V Prey (2024)
- Primeval (2005–18)
- The Prisoner (1998–2007)
- Private Schulz (1998–2006)
- Psychoville (2009–14)
- Pulling (2007–12)

=== R ===
- Red Dwarf (1998–2019)
- Reindeer Family and Me (2017)
- Rentaghost (1998–2005)
- Rex the Runt (1999–2005)
- Ripper Street (2013–17)
- Ripping Yarns (1998–2008)
- Rising Damp (1998–2005)
- Rizzoli & Isles (2017–21)
- Robin Hood (2007–13)
- Rock and Chips (2010–13)
- Rock Profile (2000–04; 2008–11)
- Rockface (2002–08)
- The Rolling Stones: Truth and Lies (1999)
- The Royle Family (1998–2017)

=== S ===
- The Saint (1998–2008)
- Saxondale (2006–09; 2014)
- Seven of One (1998–2007)
- Seven Worlds, One Planet (2019)
- Shark (2015)
- Sharpe (1998–2013)
- A Sharp Intake of Breath (1998–2009)
- Sherlock (2016)
- Shooting Stars (1998–2014)
- Silent Witness (2010–17)
- Smack the Pony (2000–11)
- The Smell of Reeves and Mortimer (1999–2004)
- Snow Chick: A Penguin's Tale (2015)
- The Snow Wolf: A Winter's Tale (2018)
- Solo (1998–2006)
- Sorry! (1998–2006)
- Spaced (2001–13)
- Spy In The Snow (2018)
- Star Stories (2008–15)
- Star Trek
- Star Trek: Deep Space Nine
- Star Trek: The Next Generation
- Star Trek: Voyager
- State of Play (2004–14)
- The State Within (2007)
- Stay Lucky (1998–2006)
- Stella Street (1998–2004; 2007)
- Steve Coogan: The Inside Story (2010; 2014)
- Still Open All Hours (2014–19)
- Survivors (2009–17)
- Sykes (1998–2005)

=== T ===
- Taggart (1998–2013)
- The Thick of It (2005–15)
- The Thin Blue Line (1998–2009)
- This Life (1998–2005)
- Top Gear (2002–22)
- Top of The Pops (1998–2018)
- Torchwood (2007–16)
- Trailer Park Boys (2002–08)
- The Trip (2011–19)
- Trust (2006–14)

=== U ===
- University Challenge (1998–2019)
- Upstart Crow (2016–19)

=== V ===
- Velvet Soup (2002–06)
- The Vicar of Dibley (1998–2015; 2018)

=== W ===
- Wallace & Gromit (1998–2016)
- The Weakest Link (2000–19)
- Weird Wonders of the World (2016)
- Whose Line Is It Anyway? (1998–2016)
- Wire in the Blood (2003–10)
- Wild Africa: Enchanted Kingdom (2021)
- Wild Arabia (2013)
- Wild France (2013)
- Wild Patagonia (2021)
- The Wild Sides (2023)
- World News Today (2006-10)

=== X ===
- The X-Files (1998–2019)

=== Y ===
- Yellowstone (2009)
- The Young Ones (1998–2009)

== See also ==
- List of programs broadcast by the BBC
- List of programs broadcast by BBC Canada
