= Phil Spencer: Secret Agent =

- Genre: Property; Factual entertainment
- Presented by: Phil Spencer
- Country of origin: United Kingdom
- Original language: English
- No. of episodes: 102

Production
- Running time: 60 minutes (inc. adverts)

Original release
- Network: Channel 4
- Release: 22 September 2012 – 2015

Phil Spencer: Secret Agent was a Channel 4 television show, presented by property expert Phil Spencer of Location, Location, Location. It ran for 102 episodes between 2011 and 2015. It was produced by Raise the Roof Productions.

== Format ==
Each episode features a house which the owners are struggling to sell. Spencer acts as their "secret agent", viewing the property without them present and preparing his own alternative set of sales particulars, entitled "The Brutal Truth", designed to show why the property is not selling. The owners then have a week to act on Spencer's suggestions before hosting an open day for buyers. From 2013 onwards, each episode features two properties.

== Secret Agent Down Under ==
Phil Spencer also presented an Australian version of the show, again for Channel 4.
