= Cath Kidston =

English fashion designer, businesswoman and author (born 1958)

Cath Kidston MBE
- Born: Catherine Isabel Audrey Kidston; 6 November 1958 (age 67)
- Occupations: Fashion designer; businesswoman; author
- Organisation: Cath Kidston Limited
- Known for: Floral prints and patterns
- Spouse: Hugh Padgham (m. 2012)
- Relatives: Glen Kidston (grandfather); Kirstie Allsopp (cousin); Sofie Allsopp (cousin)

Catherine Isabel Audrey Kidston (born 6 November 1958) is an English fashion designer, businesswoman and author whose company, Cath Kidston Limited, sold home furnishings and related goods online, through franchises and by mail order. She is particularly known for her nostalgic floral patterns.

== Family background and early life ==
Kidston was born in Hampshire, England and grew up in the Cotswolds. Kidston's paternal grandparents were Glen Kidston, a successful racing driver for Bentley in the 1920s, and Nancy Soames. Nancy is also Samantha Cameron's paternal grandmother, making them half first cousins. Television presenters Kirstie Allsopp and Sofie Allsopp are her maternal second cousins, daughters of Charles Allsopp, 6th Baron Hindlip, the former chairman of Christie's.

Kidston was diagnosed as dyslexic but wasn't aware until her mother told her when she was 24.

== Career ==
Prior to founding the Cath Kidston brand, Kidston worked in shops and galleries, later starting a design company with a friend. For a time, she worked for Nicky Haslam.

Kidston opened her first shop in London's Holland Park in 1993, selling hand-embroidered tea-towels.

By the end of 2013, she had 136 outlets, including a flagship store on Piccadilly next to Fortnum & Mason and four stores in China. Appearing on BBC Radio 4's Desert Island Discs programme, Kidston described her shops as provoking a 'Marmite reaction': "People either love it and want a little bit of it very much, or want to stab us."

In 2010, she sold a majority stake of the company to private equity investors TA Associates, retaining a minority stake and remaining the company's Creative Director. The sale was reported to be worth £100 million.

Prince George wore one of her outfits, which quickly sold out.

In 2021, Kidston founded the brand C.Atherley, a British beauty company that sells creams, bath oils and diffusers.

=== Collaborations ===
Kidston has worked with Millets to design tents (2005–06), Nokia/ Carphone Warehouse mobile phones (2006), and Roberts radios (2005 onwards). In 2008, she collaborated with Tesco to produce shopping bags made from plastic bottles, which were sold to raise almost £500,000 for Marie Curie Cancer Care and saved about six million plastic bottles from landfill.

== Personal life ==
In 1996, Kidston was diagnosed with breast cancer at the age of 36.

Kidston is married to record producer Hugh Padgham and has one stepdaughter. Kidston has two pets, a Sealyham Terrier named Billie and a Lakeland Terrier named Stanley, who feature in her designs. She owns homes in West London and Gloucestershire.
