= Cath Kidston Limited =

Home furnishing retail company headquartered in London

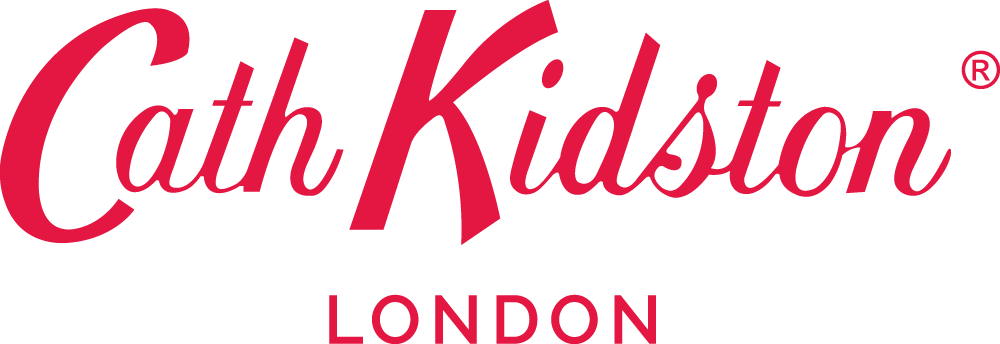

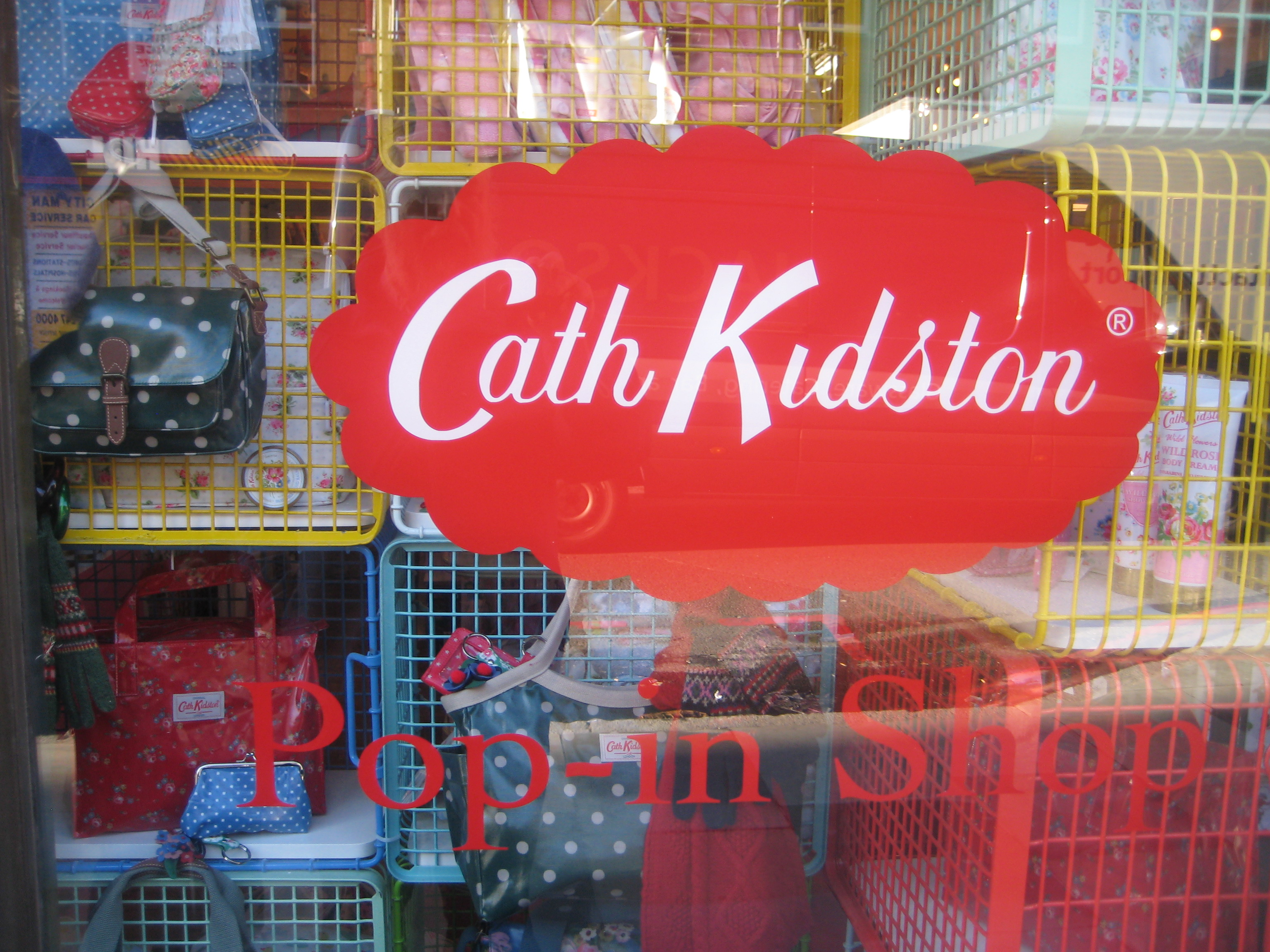
- Kidston shop window display, with company logo
- Company type: Limited company
- Industry: Home furnishing
- Founded: 13 April 1993
- Founder: Cath Kidston
- Headquarters: London, England
- Website: www.cathkidston.co.uk

Cath Kidston Limited was a British international home furnishing retail company with headquarters in London, with a focus on handicraft and vintage themed items that embody a quintessentially British lifestyle. In March 2023 it ceased to exist as a trading entity with the intellectual property acquired by retailer Next Plc.

== Early years ==
Designer Cath Kidston opened her first shop in London's Holland Park in 1993, selling hand-embroidered tea-towels. In April 2011, there were 41 shops and concessions in the UK, two in the Republic of Ireland, eleven in Japan and three in Korea. Less than three years later there were 136 outlets, including a flagship store on Piccadilly next to Fortnum & Mason, and four stores in China. Appearing on BBC Radio 4's Desert Island Discs programme, she described her shops as provoking a 'Marmite reaction': "People either love it and want a little bit of it very much, or want to stab us."

The company's profits jumped more than 60 per cent from £2.9m to £4.6m in the year to March 2009. Sales rose to £31.3m during the period, compared with £19.3m the year before, partly due to new store openings.

== Private equity investment ==
In 2010, Cath Kidston sold a majority stake of the company to private equity investors TA Associates, retaining a minority stake and remaining the company's Creative Director. The transaction was reported as valuing the group at £100m.

In 2014, TA Associates sold a stake to Baring Private Equity Asia for an undisclosed amount, reported to value the group around £250m. In 2016 Baring Private Equity Asia acquired the remaining shares of the group in a transaction that saw chairman Paul Mason replaced by William Flanz, former chairman and executive of Gucci Group.

Under Baring Private Equity Asia's ownership the business struggled, reporting a reduction in Earnings from £11.7m in 2014 to a loss of £17.6m in the year ended March 2019. After launching a sale process in early 2020 that was impacted by the coronavirus pandemic, administrators Alvarez & Marsal were appointed and sold the business and assets of the company through a "pre-pack" administration sale back to Baring Private Equity Asia in a transaction that valued the assets of the group at £17.8m whilst shedding liabilities of the group including the majority of leases on UK shops, This resulted in the closure of 60 UK stores on 21 April, with the loss of over 900 jobs. Under the arrangement, the company planned to continue trading online and via its wholesale and franchise businesses including overseas outlets.

In June 2022 the company was acquired by HUK 113 Limited, a recently incorporated Special Purpose Vehicle owned by turnaround investor Hilco Capital for an undisclosed fee in a transaction that also involved Hilco providing a £10m 3-year working capital loan facility to the company.

Despite the three-year nature of Hilco's funding, a further sale process was commenced less than eight months later. In March 2023 the intellectual property of the group was acquired by Next plc in a further pre-pack administration led by PwC for £8.5 million. The four remaining shops in the group would trade until existing stock was exhausted before permanently closing.
