= Listed buildings in Rise, East Riding of Yorkshire =

Rise is a civil parish in the county of the East Riding of Yorkshire, England. It contains eight listed buildings that are recorded in the National Heritage List for England. Of these, one is listed at Grade II*, the middle of the three grades, and the others are at Grade II, the lowest grade. The parish contains the village of Rise and the surrounding area. The most important building in the parish is the former country house Rise Hall, which is listed together with associated structures, and the other listed buildings are a church and a former rectory.

== Key ==
Grade	Criteria
II*	Particularly important buildings of more than special interest
II	Buildings of national importance and special interest

== Buildings ==
Name and location	Photograph	Date	Notes	Grade
Rise Park; 53.86051°N 0.25253°W		1809	A rectory, later used for other purposes, in colourwashed brick, with stone dressings, sill bands, and a Welsh slate roof with stone kneelers and copings. There are two storeys, a U-shaped plan with rear infill and a range on the right, and a front range of five bays. In the centre is a doorway with pilasters, a divided fanlight, and a triangular pediment on consoles. The windows are sashes with wedge lintels. On the right gable is a round-headed window.	II
Rise Hall; 53.86095°N 0.24771°W	—	1815–20	A small country house later used for other purposes, it is in sandstone on the main fronts, and in pinkish-brown brick at the rear, on a plinth, and has hipped Welsh slate roofs. The house is in Classical style, with two storeys, and has an approximately H-shaped plan. The west front has nine bays, a moulded cornice and blocking course, and a full-height tetrastyle portico with a plain frieze and a moulded pediment. The windows are sashes, those on the ground floor with panelled aprons, and on the upper floor with stone sills. The south front has eleven bays, the middle three projecting under a pediment, and the outer bays also projecting, and to the east are further ranges. On the north front are nine bays, the outer bays projecting.	II*
South Lodge; 53.85173°N 0.25990°W	—	1818 (probable)	The lodge is in stuccoed and rendered brick, with quoins, overhanging eaves and a slate roof. There are two storeys, the front is gabled, to the left is a single-storey lean-to and on the right is a single-storey wing with a hipped roof. In the centre is a canted bay window, and the other windows are horizontally sliding sashes with hood moulds. The entrance is in the lean-to, and has an ogee arch, and on the side is a rustic loggia. On the wing is a verandah.	II
West and East Stone Lodges, walls, gates and railings 53.86082°N 0.25558°W		1818 (probable)	The pair of mirror-image lodges at the north entrance to the grounds of Rise Hall are in sandstone with pyramidal Welsh slate roofs, a square plan and a single storey. On the inner return of each lodge is a doorway with a fanlight, flanked by sash windows with aprons. The front and rear are on a plinth, and contain a central recess with a sash window and an apron, flanked by Ionic columns carrying a continuous frieze, a cornice, and a blocking course. The lodges are flanked by curved walls ending in square piers with pyramidal caps. Between the lodges are wrought iron gates and railings.	II
South Lodge Cottage; 53.85678°N 0.23832°W	—	c. 1820	The house is in reddish-yellow brick with overhanging eaves and a hipped slate roof. There is a single storey, and an octagonal plan with a rear extension. In the centre is a doorway with a fanlight flanked by blocked windows under a continuous stepped hood mould. Elsewhere, there are casement windows and blocked windows, all the openings with hood moulds.	II
Outbuilding, Rise Hall; 53.86163°N 0.24669°W	—	Early 19th century	The outbuilding is in pinkish-brown brick, with a hipped Welsh slate roof. There is a single tall storey, and two bays. It contains a central doorway, and sash windows under flat arches of red rubbed brick.	II
Stables and coach house, Rise Hall; 53.86151°N 0.24723°W	—	Early 19th century	The stables and coach house are in pinkish-brown brick, with red brick dressings, and hipped Welsh slate roofs. They form an approximately square plan with a central courtyard, now covered. The front range has two storeys and seven bays, the central bay wider and projecting under a pediment containing a clock face. This bay contains a full-height round-arched carriage entrance with a blocked lunette containing a five-light window, and above is a dentilled cornice. The outer bays contain sash windows under flat arches of red gauged brick. On the roof is a wooden cupola with a weathervane. To the right of the entrance is a mounting block.	II
All Saints' Church; 53.86103°N 0.25349°W		1844–45	The church, which was rebuilt by R. D. Chantrell, is built in sandstone with a Welsh slate roof. It consists of a nave, a south porch, a chancel with a north vestry, and a west steeple. The steeple has a tower with three stages, angle buttresses, lancet windows, a chamfered band, twin lancet bell openings with double chamfered surrounds and hood moulds, a corbel table, and a splay-footed spire with lucarnes. All the windows on the body of the church are lancets.	II
