= Help! My House is Falling Down =

British television series

- Also known as: Sarah Beeny: Help! My House is Falling Down
- Genre: Reality television Home improvement
- Directed by: Emma Peach
- Presented by: Sarah Beeny
- Country of origin: United Kingdom
- Original language: English
- No. of seasons: 2
- No. of episodes: 13

Production
- Running time: 60 minutes
- Production company: Red House Television

Original release
- Network: Channel 4
- Release: August 10, 2010 – 2011

Help! My House is Falling Down is a Channel 4 show hosted by Sarah Beeny. She and her team of experts travel around Britain looking for homes that need urgent repair. The show dispenses advice on what constitutes a minor or major repair (using the professional know-how of Chartered Structural Engineer Simon Pitchers), and follows the work completed.

The show first aired on 10 August 2010, and saw Sarah Beeny visit six residences around Britain. In episode one, a couple were desperate to save their 250-year-old cottage in Northampton from woodworm, erosion, flooding and brick-eating bees. . The second episode involved Sarah rescuing an Essex home from sludge, sewage, rats and black mould. Sarah headed to Hull for the third episode in which troublesome tree roots caused massive cracking to internal walls of a beautiful Victorian property. In episode four, a young couple from Brighton battled with disintegrating walls and chronic damp. Fareham played host to episode five, and Sarah attempted to rescue a house that was sinking into the ground. Add to that a failing roof, shifting floors and sewage problems, and this 16 room Georgian house proves to be a very large challenge. In the final episode of the season, Sarah helps a couple in Staines who returned from their honeymoon to find burst pipes and extreme flooding.

The popular show returned for a second season in 2011, with Sarah visiting seven locations, including Swindon, Warwick, Essex and Woolwich. Sarah helped families overcome rodent infestations, severe subsidence, damaged electrics, decaying floors, rotting roof beams and worrying structural failure.

The show is directed by Emma Peach and a number of repair and restoration experts are consulted for each episode. It broadcasts on Channel 4 in Great Britain and Ireland, and on the Lifestyle cable channel in Australia.
