= Sarah Beeny =

English broadcaster and entrepreneur (born 1972)

Sarah Lucinda Beeny
- Born: Sarah Beeny; 9 January 1972 (age 54); Reading, Berkshire, England
- Education: Queen Mary's College
- Occupations: Property developer, businesswoman, broadcaster
- Spouse: Graham Swift (m. 2003)
- Children: 4
- Website: sarahbeeny.com (official website)

Sarah Lucinda Beeny (born 1972) is an English broadcaster and entrepreneur, best known for presenting Property Ladder (2001–2009), Britain's Best Home (2003), Streets Ahead (2005–2006), Property Snakes and Ladders (2009), How to Live Mortgage Free with Sarah Beeny (2017), Sarah Beeny's New Life in the Country (2020–2025) and Sarah Beeny's New Country Lives (2023).

Beeny is a high-profile campaigner for buildings at risk and personally renovated Rise Hall, a 32-bedroomed Grade II* listed hall in the East Riding of Yorkshire, before building a new property for her family and herself in Somerset. Beeny has written regular columns for national newspapers and magazines, in addition to numerous books. She launched her podcast Round the Houses with Sarah Beeny in 2018, featuring a variety of wealthy and famous guests who allow Beeny into their homes and their lives.

== Early life and education ==
Sarah Lucinda Beeny was born in 1972 in Reading, Berkshire, to Richard, an architect for Bovis Homes, and Ann. Beeny has an elder brother. The family lived in two converted brick cottages in a nine-acre plot on the edge of the Duke of Wellington's estate at Stratfield Saye in Hampshire, in a style that Beeny describes as "a bit like The Good Life".

After her mother died aged 39 of breast cancer when Beeny was 10, she was educated as a weekly boarder at the all-girls Luckley-Oakfield School in Wokingham. Although her friends went to university, Beeny did not; she was encouraged to study drama by her English teacher and took a leading role in Brecht's Caucasian Chalk Circle. Pursuing the idea of becoming a professional actress, she studied drama at Queen Mary's College, Basingstoke, but failed to get into a drama school.

Beeny travelled around the world solo at the age of 17 and felt "lonely and seasick" most of the way round. She returned to the UK to take a series of jobs, including: working for Save the Children; window-cleaning; door-to-door vacuum cleaner-selling and running her own sandwich-making business. Assuming she would be self-employed for the rest of her life, at weekends she would study the property market, which gave her a good grounding in the market. Having saved up a deposit, without any formal training, Beeny began her own property-developing business with her brother and her husband. Beeny is also the co-founder of the UK dating website MySingleFriend.com.

== Career ==
After meeting the sister-in-law of Sarah Delafield-Cook, a talent hunter at Talkback Thames, at a hen party, Beeny was asked to undertake a screen test to front a new television series about property development. The success of Property Ladder led to various spin-off series, including Britain's Best Home, Streets Ahead and Property Snakes and Ladders.

In 2006, Beeny presented One Year to Pay Off Your Mortgage. She wrote a number of books to accompany the series, as well as a weekly column for the Mail on Sunday. In 2007, Beeny appeared on the Channel 5 motoring show Fifth Gear, where she raced Jason Plato in an articulated lorry around a course. She has appeared on Gordon Ramsay's The F-Word, where she offered up her garden for Ramsay's sheep to feed on. In August 2010, she fronted the Channel 4 programme Help! My House is Falling Down, which had the working title of House Rescue before its commission. In November 2010, she presented Beeny's Restoration Nightmare on Channel 4, showing her renovation of Rise Hall, a Grade II* listed historic house near Rise, East Riding of Yorkshire, to create a wedding venue. Beeny sold Rise Hall in 2019 to a luxury events, weddings and catering business.

In August 2011, Beeny began presenting a new series for BBC One titled Village SOS. In this series, the programme follows a group of passionate villagers who want to restore their village to its former glory.

In 2012, Beeny presented Double Your House for Half the Money, a series that showed viewers how they could potentially have the home they have always dreamed about, even if they could not afford to buy it. This series ran for three seasons.

In 2014, she presented Sarah Beeny's How to Sell Your Home. How to Live Mortgage Free with Sarah Beeny followed in 2017. In 2018, Beeny launched her podcast At Home with Sarah Beeny, a series where famous personalities give Beeny access to the inside of their homes and their lives. The series has included guests such as Jo Wood, Tim Lovejoy, Lynn Bowles and Pearl Lowe.

From 2020, Beeny featured in Sarah Beeny's New Life in the Country, which showed her family's move to Somerset from London, including building their dream home and adapting to country life. A third series began in April 2023. In June 2022, Sarah Beeny's Little House Big Plans premiered on Channel 4.

In May 2023, Sarah Beeny's New Country Lives began airing on Channel 4. The series sees Beeny "follow city dwellers as they up sticks and move to the country in pursuit of a slower pace of life".

== Personal life ==
Beeny met her husband and business partner, Graham Swift, when she was 18 years old. Her brother, Diccon, is married to Swift's sister, Caroline. Beeny and Swift have four sons. They previously lived in Streatham. In 2001, the couple bought Rise Hall, in the East Riding of Yorkshire paying £435,000 for the property, and began restoration work on it; Beeny and Swift sold Rise Hall for £1.4 million in 2019. After selling Rise Hall, Beeny and Swift left London and moved to the Somerset countryside.

=== Breast cancer ===
In August 2022, Beeny revealed that she would be receiving radiotherapy and chemotherapy for breast cancer; Beeny lost her mother Ann to the same disease at the age of 39 when she was 10 years old. In November 2022, it was announced that Channel 4 had commissioned a documentary to follow Beeny and her family as she undergoes treatment. On 14 April 2023, Beeny confirmed doctors had given her the all clear from breast cancer following treatment. In June 2023, her documentary film, Sarah Beeny vs Cancer, aired on Channel 4. The film documents Beeny's journey with breast cancer, from diagnosis through treatment and mastectomy. It was praised for being candid, honest and crucial.

=== The Entitled Sons ===
Beeny's four sons and husband Graham formed the Somerset-based rock band The Entitled Sons in 2022; it comprises Billy (keyboards), Charlie (lead vocals), Rafferty (guitar), Laurie (drums) and Graham (bass). They wrote and produced their first single, "Break", which was released on 25 January 2022, and within days got into the top 10 of the rock category of the iTunes charts, and number 45 in the national rock chart on 28 January 2022. Winning the Pilton Stage Competition in early 2023, the band was due to perform at the 2023 Glastonbury Festival. The Entitled Sons released the single "Not Invited" in April 2023.

=== Politics and charity ===
In 2014, Beeny was one of 200 public figures who were signatories to a letter to The Guardian expressing their hope that Scotland would vote to remain part of the United Kingdom in the September 2014 referendum on that issue.

Beeny is a keen supporter of Brain Tumour Research. In March 2017, she said: "Brain tumours remain a forgotten form of cancer, receiving scant attention from potential funders. More research is needed so fewer lives will be devastated by this dreadful disease. I want my generation to look back in future years and be incredulous that anyone died of cancer. I want to see a day when cancer is no longer life-threatening, when the notion that cancer could be a killer is thought absurd." Beeny is also a supporter of Cardboard Citizens.

== Filmography ==
=== Selected television credits ===
| Year | Title | Role | Notes |
|---|---|---|---|
| 2001–2006 | Property Ladder | Herself / Presenter | 10 episodes; also advisor |
| 2002 | From House to Home | Herself / Presenter | 8 episodes |
| 2003 | Britain's Best Home | Herself / Presenter | 7 episodes |
| 2004–2017 | The Wright Stuff | Herself | 10 episodes |
| 2005 | 8 Out of 10 Cats | Herself | Series 1 episode 8 |
| 2005–2006 | Streets Ahead | Herself / Presenter | 7 episodes; also advisor |
| 2006 | The Allstar Workout | Herself / Presenter | Video release |
| 2010–2011 | Help! My House is Falling Down | Herself / Presenter | 7 episodes |
| 2010–2011 | Beeny's Restoration Nightmare | Herself / Presenter | 9 episodes |
| 2011 | Help! My House is Falling Down | Herself / Presenter | 6 episodes |
| 2012–2014 | Double Your House for Half the Money | Herself / Presenter | 21 episodes |
| 2013 | A Great British Christmas with Sarah Beeny | Herself / Presenter | Television special |
| 2014 | Stars at Your Service | Herself | 1 episode |
| 2014 | Sarah Beeny's How to Sell Your Home | Herself / Presenter | 6 episodes |
| 2016–2019 | Four Rooms | Herself / Presenter | 20 episodes |
| 2017 | How to Live Mortgage Free with Sarah Beeny | Herself / Presenter | 6 episodes |
| 2017–2018, 2025 | Good Morning Britain | Herself / TV Property Expert | |
| 2018 | Big Star's Little Star | Herself / Contestant | 1 episode |
| 2019–2020 | Sarah Beeny's Renovate Don't Relocate | Herself / Presenter | 36 episodes; also production consultant |
| 2020–2025 | Sarah Beeny's New Life in the Country | Herself | 32 episodes |
| 2023 | Sarah Beeny's New Country Lives | Herself / Presenter | 20 episodes |
| 2023 | Sarah Beeny vs Cancer | Herself | Documentary |
| 2023 | Sarah Beeny's Little House, Big Plans | Herself / Presenter | 6 episodes |
| 2026 | I Bought It At Auction | Herself / Presenter | 6 episodes |

== Books ==
- Property Ladder: How to Make Pounds from Property (Cassell Illustrated, 1 November 2002) ISBN 978-1844030224
- Property Ladder: Profit from Property (Cassell Illustrated, 15 November 2003) ISBN 978-1844031917
- Property Ladder: The Developer's Bible (Cassell Illustrated, 31 October 2004) ISBN 978-1844032792
- Sarah Beeny's Price the Job (Collins & Brown, 14 April 2006) ISBN 978-1843403609
- Property Ladder: Hints and Tips (Cassell Illustrated, 14 September 2006) ISBN 978-1844035182
- A Date with Sarah Beeny: Mysinglefriend.com's Guide to Dating and Dumping, Flirting and Flings (Harper, 1 May 2007) ISBN 978-0007250424
- Property Ladder: Sarah Beeny's Design for Profit (Cassell Illustrated, 1 June 2009) ISBN 978-1844036455
- Sarah Beeny's Green Your Home (Collins & Brown, 1 June 2009) ISBN 978-1843404927
- Sarah Beeny's 100 DIY Jobs: The Essentials Made Simple (Quadrille Publishing, 10 April 2014) ISBN 978-1857023350
- DIY Home Repairs: 100 Fix-It-Yourself Projects (Adams Media Corporation, 2 January 2015) ISBN 978-1440585296
- The Simple Life: How I Found Home (Orion, 31 August 2023) ISBN 978-1399613323
