= Property Ladder (British TV series) =

Home renovation television series

- Genre: Entertainment
- Presented by: Sarah Beeny
- Country of origin: United Kingdom
- Original language: English
- No. of series: 7

Production
- Running time: 50 minutes (inc. adverts)
- Production company: TalkbackTHAMES

Original release
- Network: Channel 4
- Release: 27 September 2001 – 2009

Property Ladder is the original British version of the television series Property Ladder, and ran for seven series between 2001 and 2009. Hosted by Sarah Beeny, it follows the journey of amateur property developers as they set out to make a life-changing profit from renovating challenging houses.

The show underwent a change in format during 2004, featuring two developments per episode rather than one. In early 2009, Channel 4 announced that a new series, re-titled Property Snakes and Ladders, would be broadcast. The first to be filmed in a struggling market, ultimately it was the final series broadcast.

In 2012, Beeny returned to the format to host Double Your House for Half The Money, which follows two sets of home owners renovating their own homes rather than developing them to sell.
