= Lush House =

- Genre: Lifestyle
- Directed by: Rebecca Barry; Sandra Welkerling
- Presented by: Shannon Lush
- Country of origin: Australia
- Original language: English
- No. of seasons: 1
- No. of episodes: 10

Production
- Executive producer: Chris Hilton
- Producers: Sonja Armstrong; Will Parry
- Running time: 30 minutes (including commercials)
- Production companies: Essential Media and Entertainment

Original release
- Network: The LifeStyle Channel
- Release: 27 April 2009 – present

Lush House is an Australian lifestyle television series that first aired on The LifeStyle Channel on Monday, 27 April 2009 at 7:30pm.

The show is presented by Shannon Lush, who visits households in need of a major clean-up and helps the families discover what is the best cleaning solutions for them and their lifestyles. It also offers tips on cleaning their homes in an eco-friendly way. The series has an original first series order of 10 episodes.
