= Lifestyle (Australian TV channel) =

Australian television channel

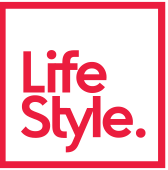
- Country: Australia

Programming
- Language: English
- Picture format: 576i (SDTV); 1080i (HDTV)
- Timeshift service: Lifestyle +2

Ownership
- Owner: Foxtel
- Sister channels: Foxtel Networks channels

History
- Launched: 1 September 1997
- Former names: The LifeStyle Channel (1997–2010)

Links
- Website: lifestyle.com.au

Availability

Streaming media
- Foxtel Go: Channel 106
- Binge: binge.com.au

Former LifeStyle Channel logo (2010–16)

LifeStyle (formerly known as The LifeStyle Channel) is an Australian pay-TV channel currently owned and operated by Foxtel. The channel was launched by XYZnetworks on 1 September 1997. The channel primarily broadcasts non-fiction content covering contemporary lifestyle interests including food and wine, home and garden, real estate, shopping, travel, leisure, and real life drama.

On 1 March 2011, a HD simulcast of Lifestyle launched on Austar and Foxtel on channel 216.

On 19 September 2016, all LifeStyle channels refreshed their look which included new unified logos. A second brand refresh took place in November 2019.

A LifeStyle branded streaming service, independent from Foxtel's other video-on-demand services, was launched in 2024 under the company's Hubbl division. It was retired in February 2026, with most content moving to their general entertainment service Binge.

== Sister networks ==
Foxtel operates three other channels under the LifeStyle group.

Lifestyle FOOD, a network dedicated to food, drink, and restaurant culture, launched on 14 March 2004. The channel hosts a number of original shows including The Great Australian Bake Off, Come Dine with Me Australia, Paddock to Plate, River Cottage Australia, Planet Cake, and Great BBQ Challenge.

Lifestyle HOME, dedicated to home and garden improvement, investment, and renovation programs, was launched on 1 March 2010, as a replacement for the former HOW TO Channel. Original programming on the network includes shows such as Deadline Design and Tiny House Australia.

A third network, Lifestyle YOU, focused on inspirational content, as well as programming catered to relationships and women's health and wellness. The channel launched on 11 November 2009 alongside twelve other channels, as part of Foxtel's "Next Generation" service launch. Lifestyle YOU closed on 11 October 2017, with most programming moving to the main LifeStyle channel and Fox Arena. The channel hosted local versions of programs such as Wife Swap, Embarrassing Bodies, and Eat Yourself Sexy.

In 2019, a re-organisation of Foxtel Networks additionally placed Fox Arena under the LifeStyle group which hosts reality television and pop culture programming. Despite this change, the channel retains its unique branding and programming.

== Programming ==
=== Current original programming ===
- Selling Houses Australia (2008–present)
- Grand Designs Australia (2010–2023)
- Gogglebox Australia (2015–2024, co-production with Network 10) (Note: Gogglebox Australia became a Channel 10 exclusive in 2025 after Lifestyle ended its co-production partnership, though pre-2024 episodes continue to air in reruns.)
- Love It or List It Australia (2017–present)
- The Great Australian Bake Off (2013 on Nine, 2015 & 2016 on Lifestyle Food, 2018–present)
- The Repair Shop Australia (2022–present)
- Billion Dollar Playground (2025–present)

=== Former original programming ===
- The Best in Australia (2007)
- Chefs Christmas (2007)
- Neil Perry: High Steaks (2007)
- The Pub with One Beer (2007)
- 4 Ingredients (2008)
- Brendan's Green Gift (2008)
- Dry Spell Gardening (2008)
- Bill's Holiday (2009)
- Garden Angels (2009)
- Lush House (2009)
- Matthew Hayden's Home Ground (2010)
- Donna Hay – Fast, Fresh Simple (2011)
- Relocation Relocation Australia (2011)
- Location Location Location Australia (2012–2014)
- Embarrassing Bodies Down Under (2013)
- River Cottage Australia (2013–2014; moved to Lifestyle Food in 2015)
- Paddock to Plate (2013–2014)
- Village Vets Australia (2014–2015)

=== Acquired programming ===
- Grand Designs
- Property Ladder
- Location, Location, Location
- Relocation, Relocation
- Antiques Roadshow
- Bargain Hunt
- River Cottage
- Extreme Fishing with Robson Green
- Hot Property
- Border Security
- Help! My House is Falling Down
- Missing Ocean Bubbles
- Toddlers & Tiaras
