= Village SOS – Big Lottery Fund =

UK village funding programme started in 2009

The Village SOS programme (Village SOS – Big Lottery Fund) was established by the UK's Big Lottery Fund to provide economic regeneration funding for rural communities. The programme was announced in early 2009 and villages with a population of less than 2000 were invited to bid for the money in a competition-style bidding process. A second phase was launched in 2014.

== 2009-2011 programme ==
A first round application had to be submitted in August 2009 and over 20 villages from across the UK won through to round two.

The Village SOS programme stood out from other funding programmes run by the Big Lottery Fund. Firstly the final six successful villages would each be filmed by BBC Wales for a TV series presented by Sarah Beeny and secondly a 'village champion' would be required to move into each successful village and work with the community to develop the projects. The second round applications started with a 'speed-dating' exercise where the round-two villages met with potential village champions. Each village identified three potential champions and each champion selected three potential villages. Final interviews took place in each village.

Round two applications were funded by a £20,000 development grant and involved writing a detailed Business Plan and Capital Delivery Plan. These had to be completed by March 2010 and in May 2010, each village had to give a 20-minute presentation to the BIG board members who selected the final six villages. In the end ten villages were chosen, six of whom were to be filmed by the BBC and the remainder who received only the Learning Awards. The village champions were to be paid by BIG and not from the (up to) £400,000 grants.

The six successful villages were Caistor in North Lincolnshire, Newstead in Nottinghamshire, Myddfai and Talgarth in South Wales, Tideswell in the Peak District and Honeystreet in Wiltshire. The Learning Awards villages were Howey in Powys, Lochinver in Sutherland, Ballygalley in County Antrim and West Wemyss in Fife.

Following the BBC1 broadcast in August and September 2011, a Learning Campaign - Village SOS Active - was launched to encourage rural communities to regenerate through business enterprise. A national and a series of regional conferences were run in late 2011 to enable communities to learn from existing projects and share ideas.

=== Example of the regeneration process ===
The Peak District village of Tideswell won one of the Village SOS grants. In a bid to help keep its village shops open and thriving - the village has lost over 20 shops in the past ten years - Taste Tideswell was created. Taste Tideswell aims to reconnect local people with their food and make Tideswell famous as a food destination. The activities that Taste Tideswell are undertaking fall under the following headings: Grow It, Cook It, Make It, Sell It and Share It. Taste Tideswell is a not-for-profit social enterprise and consists of two companies: Taste Tideswell Ltd and Taste Tideswell (Trading) Ltd. The companies are run by a board of volunteer directors who meet on a monthly basis.

== 2014-2015 programme ==
ACRE (Action with Communities in Rural England) received almost £1.4 million to foster social enterprises in rural communities.
