= MySingleFriend.com =

Online dating site

mysinglefriend.com
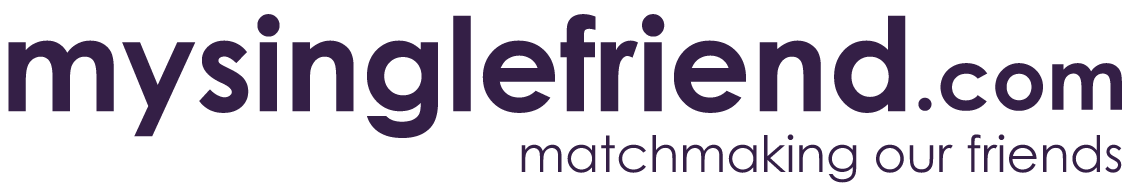
- Website type: online dating service
- Owners: Sarah Beeny, Graham Swift
- Website: http://mysinglefriend.com
- Commercial: yes
- Registration: yes
- Launched: 2005
- Current status: active

Mysinglefriend.com is a UK online dating site which claimed, in July 2013, to have over 200,000 users. One of the original founders is Sarah Beeny, a TV presenter on Channel 4. Sarah is no longer involved in the running of it having sold in 2016 retaining a minority shareholding.

The site describes itself as having "a no-nonsense approach to dating", as all of the dating profiles on the site are written by friends of single people, instead of the single person themselves. The single person can approve what has been written before it goes live, and their friend can also get involved by recommending other users on MySingleFriend to them.

The site aims to match make singles through their friend's descriptions of them, building an online community and taking away the hassle and stigma of writing your own dating profile.

== My Single Friend Limited ==
Mysinglefriend.com is owned by My Single Friend Limited, a company registered in England in August 2004.
