= Location Location Location Australia =

- Presented by: Bryce Holdaway; Veronica Morgan; Mitch Edwards; Mark McKie
- Country of origin: Australia
- Original language: English
- No. of series: 4
- No. of episodes: 40

Production
- Production company: Endemol Shine Australia

Original release
- Network: LifeStyle (2012–2014); Network 10 (2023-present)
- Release: 11 July 2012 – 14 October 2014; 30 June 2023 - present

Location Location Location Australia is an Australian television series originally presented by Bryce Holdaway and Veronica Morgan. It is an adaptation of the British series Location, Location, Location. The series was announced in 2011 and premiered on 11 July 2012. The second series premiered on 28 August 2013. The third series premiered on 12 August 2014.

Derided for the length of its name (13 syllables), the series was nominated for Most Outstanding Lifestyle Program at the 2013 ASTRA Awards. The hosts were chosen for their knowledge of real estate.

In October 2022, the series was revived by Network 10 and will air in 2023. In February 2023, it was announced former contestants and winners of The Block, Mitch Edwards and Mark McKie, will host the series for 10. The series premiered on 30 June 2023.

== Series overview ==
Series	Episodes	Originally released		
Series	Episodes	First released	Last released	Network
1	10	11 July 2012	26 September 2012	Lifestyle
2	10	28 August 2013	30 October 2013	Lifestyle
3	10	12 August 2014	14 October 2014	Lifestyle
4	10	30 June 2023	1 September 2023	Network 10

== Episodes ==
=== Series 1 (2012) ===
No.	Title	Original release date	Viewers	Rank (Night)
1	"Sydney: Balmain/Maroubra"	11 July 2012	101,000	#1
2	"Adelaide"	18 July 2012	114,000	#1
3	"Melbourne"	25 July 2012	83,000	#2
4	"Newcastle"	15 August 2012	78,000	#5
5	"Byron Bay"	22 August 2012	81,000	#2
6	"Sydney: Hills/Earlwood"	29 August 2012	78,000	#3
7	"Tasmania"	5 September 2012	91,000	#2
8	"Canberra"	12 September 2012	100,000	#1
9	"Rural Victoria"	19 September 2012	66,000	#5
10	"Sydney & Noosa"	26 September 2012	102,000	#1

=== Series 2 (2013) ===
No.	Title	Original release date	Viewers	Rank (Night)
1	"Melbourne: Bayside"	28 August 2013	105,000	#2
2	"Sunshine Coast/Central Coast"	4 September 2013	145,000	#1
3	"Sydney/Gold Coast"	11 September 2013	137,000	#1
4	"Inner City Melbourne"	18 September 2013	138,000	#1
5	"Sydney's Eastern Suburbs"	25 September 2013	114,000	#1
6	"Adelaide Hills/Melbourne"	2 October 2013	151,000	#1
7	"Sydney: Inner West/North Shore"	9 October 2013	118,000	#1
8	"Bowral/South Coast NSW"	16 October 2013	142,000	#2
9	"Sydney: Concord/Bronte"	23 October 2013	117,000	#2
10	"Brisbane/Cairns"	30 October 2013	125,000	#2

=== Series 3 (2014) ===
No.	Title	Original release date	Viewers	Rank (Night)
1	"Adelaide/Eastern Suburbs, Sydney"	12 August 2014	67,000	#5
2	"Inner West Sydney/Altona North"	19 August 2014	78,000	#3
3	"Camden/Phillip Island"	26 August 2014	62,000	#8
4	"Yarraville, Vic/Hills District"	2 September 2014	64,000	#9
5	"Hobart/Brisbane"	9 September 2014	72,000	#3
6	"Perth/Byron"	16 September 2014	80,000	#4
7	"Gold Coast/Wagga"	23 September 2014	112,000	#1
8	"Bondi/Northern NSW"	30 September 2014	99,000	#1
9	"Perth/NSW"	7 October 2014	69,000	#1
10	"Manly/Adelaide"	14 October 2014	65,000	#3

=== Series 4 (2023) ===
No.	Title	Original release date	Viewers	Rank (Night)
1	"Episode 1"	30 June 2023	351,000	#25
Location Location Location follows dynamic property experts, Mitch and Mark, as they leave no stone unturned in the quest to find the perfect home for two set of buyers each week.
2	"Melbourne inner city/Western Suburbs"	7 July 2023	375,000	#24
Location Location Location’s property experts, Mitch and Mark, are in Melbourne's inner city and western suburbs helping two sets of buyers find their perfect homes.
3	TBA	14 July 2023	N/A	TBA
Location Location Location follows dynamic property experts, Mitch and Mark, as they leave no stone unturned in the quest to find the perfect home in the soaring Sydney market for two set of buyers.
4	TBA	21 July 2023	N/A	TBA
5	TBA	28 July 2023	N/A	TBA
6	TBA	4 August 2023	N/A	TBA
7	TBA	11 August 2023	N/A	TBA
8	TBA	18 August 2023	N/A	TBA
9	TBA	25 August 2023	N/A	TBA
10	TBA	1 September 2023	N/A	TBA
