= Harry Spencer (cricketer, born 1901) =

English cricketer

Personal information
- Batting: Right-handed
- Bowling: Right arm medium
- Relatives: Phil Spencer (grandson)

Career statistics
| Competition | First-class |
|---|---|
| Matches | 4 |
| Runs scored | 32 |
| Batting average | 10.66 |
| 100s/50s | 0/0 |
| Top score | 26 |
| Balls bowled | 456 |
| Wickets | 3 |
| Bowling average | 71.33 |
| 5 wickets in innings | 0 |
| 10 wickets in match | 0 |
| Best bowling | 1/34 |
| Catches/stumpings | 3/– |
- Source: Cricinfo, 7 November 2022

Harry Norman Ernest Spencer (1 October 1901 – 13 August 1954) was an English first-class cricketer who played four matches between 1923 and 1932, one for Worcestershire and three for Warwickshire.

Born in Shipston-on-Stour, Warwickshire, Spencer made his first (and only) appearance for Worcestershire against the touring New Zealanders in June 1927. He picked up two wickets, dismissing the New Zealand captain Tom Lowry in each innings, but proved expensive: his ten overs cost him 68 runs. With the bat, Spencer made 26 and 2.

It was nearly three years before Spencer played first-class cricket again, and when it happened it was for Warwickshire. He played three matches for the county, but only managed one wicket in total, when he bowled his former teammate and Worcestershire opener Leslie Wright in the first innings of his first match for Warwickshire. In two subsequent games for the county, he bowled 31 overs without taking a wicket, although he was generally tidy: in his short Warwickshire career he conceded only 146 runs from 66 overs.

Spencer lived at 189, Old Dover Road, Canterbury, Kent, and was manager of the Canterbury branch of Lloyds Bank at the time of his death in 1954, having previously been deputy manager of the Leamington Spa branch. He was struck by a bus while crossing Oxford Street, London, dying in Hammersmith at the age of 52. He and his wife, Edna Pauline (née Hardy) were parents of engineer and farmer (Richard) David Edward Spencer, father of property expert and television presenter Phil Spencer.
