= The Entitled Sons =

English pop rock band

- Origin: Bruton, Somerset, England
- Genres: Pop rock; indie pop; indie rock; electropop; alternative rock
- Years active: 2022–present
- Members: William "Billy" Swift; Charlie Swift; Graham Swift; Laurence "Laurie" Swift; Guy "Rafferty" Swift

The Entitled Sons are an English band formed in 2022, consisting of four teenage brothers: Billy (keyboards), Charlie (lead vocals), Rafferty (guitar), Laurie (drums) and their father Graham Swift (bass).

== Background ==
The Entitled Sons first formed in 2022, consisting of 4 teenage brothers, the youngest of whom - Laurie on Drums - was 12 years old when their first single was released.

== Career ==
=== 2022-present: Debut and No Clue ===
The Entitled Sons' debut single, "Break", was released on 20 January 2022. Within a few days, the single reached the top 10 on iTunes. "Break" debuted and peaked at number 45 on the UK Singles Downloads Chart on 28 January 2022. A second single, "Unconditional", was released in March 2022, and is about their mother, Sarah Beeny.

In early 2023, the band competed in the Pilton Stage competition, a contest that provides up-and-coming bands and solo artists of any musical genre from all around the UK the chance to compete for a performance slot at Glastonbury Festival. The Entitled Sons won the competition. The band released the single "Not Invited" in April 2023. The single "It's Time" followed in May 2023. On 9 June 2023, the band released the single "These Days", in aid of Cancer Research UK. The single debuted and peaked at number 5 on the UK Singles Downloads Chart Top 100 on 16 June 2023. The band performed at Glastonbury on 22 June 2023.

On 10 May 2024, the band released the single "Maybe"; an official music video was released on the same day. In July 2024, the band released the single "Jocelyn", which was praised by Clash. An EP, Still Too Young was announced, but this was not released.

On 25 April 2025, they released the single "Still Smiling". On 25 July 2025, they released the single "Pretty Please". The single "Ordinary Boy" was released on 29 August 2025. Their debut studio album, No Clue, was released 28 November 2025, debuting and peaking at number 76 on the UK Albums Downloads Chart. A one-off concert at the O2 Academy Bristol was announced for 14 February 2026.

On 12 June 2026, the band released the single "Epitaph (Not There)"; it peaked at number 12 on the UK Physical Singles Chart and at number 7 on the UK Vinyl Singles Chart.

== Discography ==
=== Albums ===
List of studio albums, with selected details
Title	Details	Peak chart positions
No Clue	Released: 28 November 2025; Label: The Entitled Sons; Format: Digital download, streaming	UK Digital
		76

=== Singles ===
List of singles as lead artist, showing year released and originating album
Title	Year	Peak chart positions			Album
		UK Digital	UK Physical	UK Vinyl	
"Break"	2022	45	-	-	Non-album singles
"Unconditional"	2022	-	-	-	Non-album singles
"Heaven Knows"	2023	-	-	-	Non-album singles
"Criminal"	2023	-	-	-	Non-album singles
"Not Invited"	2023	-	-	-	Non-album singles
"It's Time"	2023	-	-	-	Non-album singles
"These Days"	2023	5	-	-	Non-album singles
"One Shot"	2023	-	-	-	Non-album singles
"Maybe"	2024	-	-	-	Non-album singles
"Try Hard"	2024	-	-	-	Non-album singles
"Jocelyn"	2024	-	-	-	Non-album singles
"Another Liar"	2024	-	-	-	Non-album singles
"Still Smiling"	2025	-	-	-	No Clue
"Listened to My Mother"	2025	-	-	-	No Clue
"Lover Boy"	2025	-	-	-	No Clue
"Pretty Please"	2025	-	-	-	No Clue
"Ordinary Boy"	2025	-	-	-	No Clue
"So Real"	2025	-	-	-	No Clue
"Rockstar"	2025	-	-	-	No Clue
"Epitaph (Not There)"	2026	-	12	7	Non-album single
