= Billion Dollar Playground =

Australian reality television series

- Genre: Reality television
- Directed by: Jo Siddiqui
- Country of origin: Australia
- Original language: English
- No. of seasons: 1
- No. of episodes: 8

Production
- Executive producers: Jacqueline Saddington; Howard Myers-Rifai; Alison Hurbert-Burns; Ben Davies; David Emery; Anita Brown
- Camera setup: Multiple
- Running time: 44–53 minutes
- Production company: Ronde Media

Original release
- Network: Binge; LifeStyle
- Release: 13 May 2025 – present

Billion Dollar Playground is an Australian reality television series that premiered on Binge on 13 May 2025. The series centres around an elite team of luxury service professionals to the wealthy, fulfilling every wish of their ultra-rich clients’ vacations. Commissioned by the Foxtel Group for Binge, the series is created and produced by Ronde Media.

New episodes premiere exclusively on streaming service Binge, and air same-day on LifeStyle.

In September 2025, the series was renewed for a second season.

== Overview ==
In October 2023, Foxtel commissioned the eight-part series. The unscripted series features uber-wealthy guests in high-end vacation homes with world-class staff servicing their round the clock demands. Created and developed by Ronde Media, the series was originally set to premiere on Binge in 2024.

The first season premiered on 13 May 2025.

== Cast ==
Main cast members
Crew	Seasons	
Crew	1	2
Salvatore Maiorano	Lead Concierge (Note: Maiorano quit in episode 2.)	
Heaven Leigh	Concierge	TBA
Jasmin Akers	Concierge (Note: Akers is promoted to Lead Concierge in episode 2, replacing Maiorano.)	TBA
Matt Mirosevich	Chef	TBA
George Mirosevich	Chef	TBA
JB Malandain	Butler (Note: Malandain is let go in episode 8, for undermining management.)	TBA
Nicole Zammit	Trainee Concierge	TBA
Jay Lam	Maintenance/Driver	TBA
Elsie	Housekeeper	TBA
Grace Newnham	Concierge (Note: Newnham appears in episode 4 onwards, and was promoted to Lead Concierge from episode 7, replacing Akers.)	TBA
Recurring
Alex Ormerod	Luxico CEO	Luxico CEO
Tom Ormerod	Luxico CEO	Luxico CEO

== Episodes ==
=== Season 1 (2025) ===
Jasmin Akers, Heaven Leigh, Elsie, Salvatore Maiorano, JB Malandain, George Mirosevich, Matt Mirosevich, Grace Newnham, and Nicole Zammit are introduced as series regulars.

No. overall	No. in season	Title	Original release date
1	1	"Episode 1"	13 May 2025
Property: Rawson
2	2	"Episode 2"	20 May 2025
Property: Rawson
3	3	"Episode 3"	27 May 2025
Property: Sweven Estate
4	4	"Episode 4"	3 June 2025
Property: Sweven Estate
5	5	"Episode 5"	10 June 2025
Property: Dovecote
6	6	"Episode 6"	17 June 2025
Property: Dovecote
7	7	"Episode 7"	24 June 2025
Property: Sunny Brae
8	8	"Episode 8"	1 July 2025
Property: Sunny Brae

== International broadcast ==
In February 2025, ahead of its Australian premiere, the series was sold to several international broadcasters, including the BBC in the United Kingdom, Corus Entertainment in Canada, Bravo in New Zealand, and Talpa TV in the Netherlands.

On 18 June 2025, Binge streamed the first episode on TikTok, making it the first Australian streamer to debut a full episode of a series on TikTok Live for a 24-hour period.

== See also ==
- Below Deck
