= Relocation Relocation Australia =

- Genre: Lifestyle
- Presented by: Bryce Holdaway; Veronica Morgan
- Country of origin: Australia
- Original language: English
- No. of series: 1

Production
- Running time: 60 minutes

Original release
- Network: LifeStyle
- Release: 28 September 2011 – present

Relocation Relocation Australia is an Australian lifestyle television series that first aired on The LifeStyle Channel on 28 September 2011. It is hosted by Bryce Holdaway and Veronica Morgan.
