= First Class All the Way =

- Genre: Reality television
- Starring: Sara Duffy
- Country of origin: United States
- Original language: English
- No. of seasons: 1
- No. of episodes: 6

Production
- Executive producers: Dave Osper; Lori Kaye; Scott Stone
- Running time: 42 minutes
- Production companies: Stone & Company Entertainment

Original release
- Network: Bravo
- Release: November 3 – December 8, 2008

First Class All the Way is an American reality television series that premiered on November 3, 2008, on the Bravo cable network. Announced in November 2007, the show chronicles the professional live of Sara Duffy, a founder of multimillion-dollar travel concierge business based in Los Angeles. The series features as she, with the help of her staff, tries hard to provide high-class service to their clients who are often very demanding and include billionaires, socialites and entertainment magnates.

== Episodes ==
No.	Title	Original release date
1	"Paris & Monaco"	November 3, 2008
2	"Miami"	November 10, 2008
3	"Napa Valley"	November 17, 2008
4	"Seattle"	November 24, 2008
5	"Italy: Positano & Capri"	December 1, 2008
6	"Italy: Tuscany & Florence"	December 8, 2008
