= Charles Allsopp, 6th Baron Hindlip =

British peer and businessman (1940–2024)

The Right Honourable The Lord Hindlip

Member of the House of Lords
- Lord Temporal
- as a hereditary peer 19 December 1993 – 11 November 1999
- Preceded by: The 5th Baron Hindlip
- Succeeded by: Seat abolished (Note: Under the House of Lords Act 1999.)

Personal details
- Born: Charles Henry Allsop; 5 August 1940
- Died: 5 June 2024 (aged 83) Dorset, England
- Party: Conservative
- Spouse: Fiona Victoria Jean Atherley (m. 1968; died 2014)
- Children: 4, including Kirstie and Sofie
- Occupation: Businessman, peer

Charles Henry Allsopp, 6th Baron Hindlip (5 August 1940 – 5 June 2024), was a British hereditary peer and businessman, a member of the House of Lords from 1993 until 1999.

His main career was in Christie's, the fine arts auction house, of which he was General Manager of Christie's New York and later Chairman of Christie, Manson & Woods and finally of Christie's International.

== Biography ==
The elder son of the fifth Baron Hindlip by his marriage to Cecily Valentine Jane Borwick, daughter of Lieutenant-Colonel Malcolm Borwick, Hindlip was born at Haselbech Hall in Northamptonshire. He was educated at Eton College. Hindlip served in the Coldstream Guards from 1959 until 1962, when he joined Christie's. Only three years later he was appointed General Manager of Christie's New York, where he remained until 1970. Returning to London, he was a director of Christie, Manson & Woods from 1970, deputy chairman from 1985 and chairman from 1986 to 1996, when he took over as Chairman of Christie's International, in which post he stayed until 2002. From 2003 to 2004 he was Deputy Chairman of Agnew's.

Hindlip succeeded his father as the 6th Baron Hindlip in 1993, becoming a member of the House of Lords. His last speech there, on 10 February 1999, was on the subject of droit de suite.

From 1989 to 2000, he was a Trustee of the Chatham Historic Dockyard, and was a member of White's and Pratt's.

Hindlip died at his home in Dorset on 5 June 2024, at the age of 83.

== Marriage and children ==
Hindlip married Fiona Victoria Jean Atherley (1947–2014), a daughter of Hon. William Johnston McGowan, second son of Harry McGowan, 1st Baron McGowan, on 18 April 1968. They lived at Lydden House, King's Stag, near Hazelbury Bryan, Dorset. They had four children together:

- Hon. Kirstie Mary Allsopp (born 31 August 1971)
- Henry William Allsopp, 7th Baron Hindlip (born 8 June 1973)
- Hon. Sophia Atherley Allsopp (born 1980)
- Hon. Natasha Fiona Allsopp (born 1986)

== Honours ==
- 1998: Chevalier of the Legion of Honour (France)

== Coat of arms ==
Coat of arms of Charles Allsopp, 6th Baron Hindlip
Coronet A coronet of a Baron Crest A Plover holding in the beak a Wheat-ear Or standing on a Pheon also Gold Escutcheon Sable three Pheons in chevron Or between as many Doves rising Argent each holding in the beak a Wheat-ear Or Supporters On either side a Foxhound gorged with a Pair of Couples proper Motto Festina Lente (Hasten slowly)

== Notes ==
Peerage of the United Kingdom
Preceded by Henry Allsopp	Baron Hindlip; 1993–2024; Member of the House of Lords (1993–1999)	Succeeded by Henry Allsopp
Baronetage of the United Kingdom
Preceded by Henry Allsopp	Baronet of Hindlip Hall; 1993–2024	Succeeded by Henry Allsopp
