= Kirstie Allsopp =

British television presenter (born 1971)

The Honourable Kirstie Allsopp
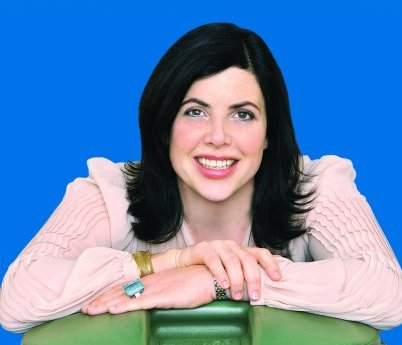
- Born: Kirstie Mary Allsopp; 31 August 1971 (age 55); Hampstead, London, England
- Occupation: TV presenter
- Notable credits: Location, Location, Location; Love It or List It; Relocation, Relocation; Location Revisited
- Spouse: Ben Andersen (m. 2025)
- Children: 2
- Father: Charles Allsopp, 6th Baron Hindlip
- Relatives: Sofie Allsopp (sister); Cath Kidston (cousin)

Kirstie Mary Allsopp (born 31 August 1971) is a British television presenter, best known as co-presenter of Channel 4 property shows including Location, Location, Location, Love It or List It UK, Relocation, Relocation and Location Revisited.

== Background ==
Allsopp is the eldest child and daughter of Charles Allsopp, 6th Baron Hindlip (1940–2024), a former chairman of Christie's, by his marriage to Fiona Victoria Jean Atherley McGowan (1947–2014). She has a younger brother and two younger sisters, including Sofie. Owing to her father's peerage, she can use the courtesy title The Honourable Kirstie Allsopp. The designer and businesswoman Cath Kidston is her cousin.

She attended ten schools as a child, including St Clotilde's in Lechlade, Gloucestershire, and Bedales near Petersfield, Hampshire. She worked at Christie's in the school holidays from 15, and got a job in an estate agents at 17. After spending time in India teaching English, Allsopp returned to the UK and began a series of positions, working for Country Living and Food & Home magazines and at Hindlip & Prentice Interiors, and studied art history at Christie's.

Allsopp set up her own home search company, Kirmir, in 1996, focusing on top end purchases in Central and West London.

In August 2014, Allsopp was one of 200 public figures who were signatories to a letter to The Guardian opposing Scottish independence in the run-up to September's referendum on that issue.

== Personal life ==
Her husband is property developer Ben Andersen, and they have two sons. The couple married, at Grosvenor Chapel in Mayfair, in January 2025, after 21 years together. Allsopp is also stepmother to Andersen's two sons from a previous relationship. They live in Notting Hill, London.

In 2008 Allsopp and her family bought and restored a house called Meadowgate, in Welcombe in rural Devon. It had been empty for 39 years. The restoration and interior decorating were the subject of the TV series Kirstie's Homemade Home. It was again the setting for her Kirstie's Homemade Christmas programme, showing people how to have an individual Christmas using secondhand and homemade products such as wreaths from material found from nearby woods.

Allsopp was criticised in 2022 for comments she made about people not being able to purchase housing, arguing many people are not willing to make enough sacrifices such as cutting out coffee, Netflix, and going to the gym. Allsopp, who received financial support from her family to purchase her first home, claimed "...there are loads of people who can [make sacrifices] and don't." Following criticism Allsopp posted several responses on Twitter before quitting the platform.
