= Rise Hall =

Grade II* listed stately home in the East Riding of Yorkshire, England

Coordinates: 53.86083°N 0.24711°W

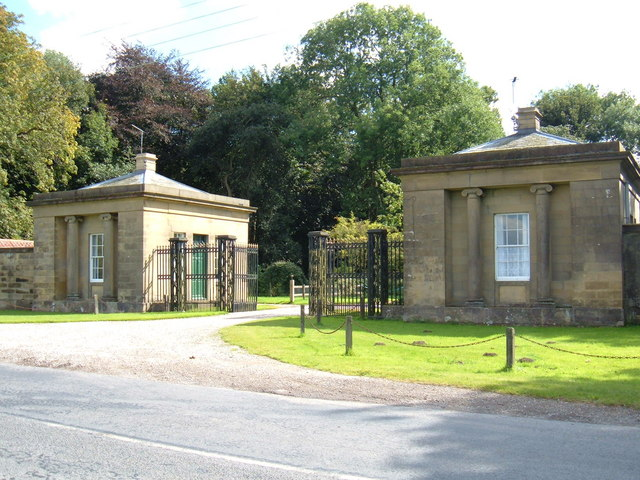
Rise Hall. This is the former main gate; originally constructed during the reconstruction of the hall in 1815-1820. It is no longer part of the estate as it was retained when the house was sold in March 2001.

Rise Hall (formerly Rise Manor, or Rise Park) is a Grade II* listed stately home in Rise, East Riding of Yorkshire, England.

== History ==
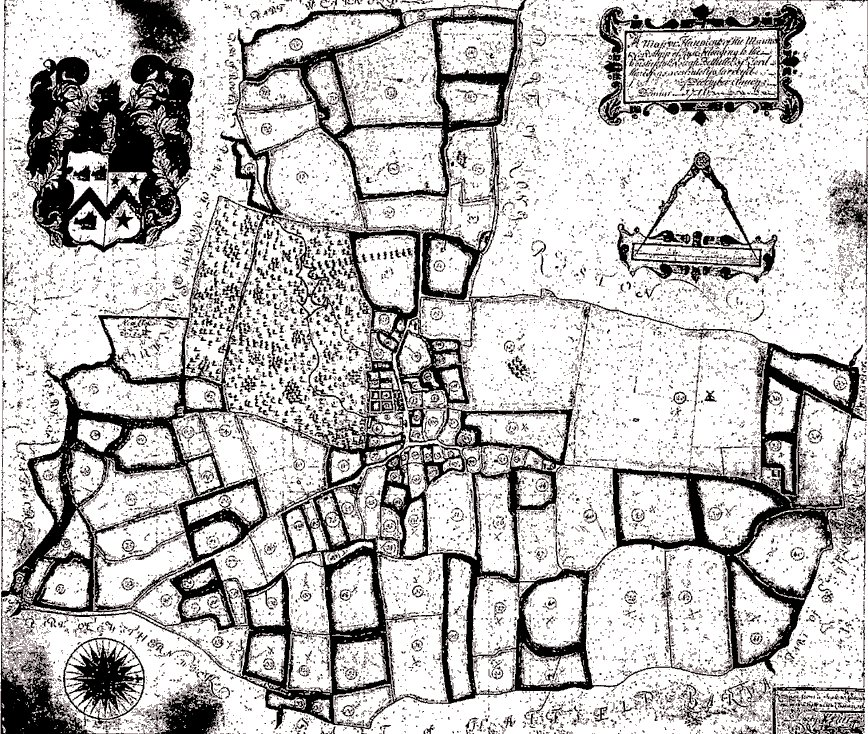
Map of Rise estate, dated 1716 with north to the right-hand side of the image.

Rise is recorded in the Domesday Book of 1086 as having been owned by Cnut (the son of Karli) in 1066. The estate at this time comprised 6 carucates of ploughed fields, a value roughly equal to 720 acres (2.9 km^{2}; 1.13 sq mi). It also had 30 acres (0.12 km^{2}; 0.047 sq mi) of meadow and 40 acres (0.16 km^{2}; 0.063 sq mi) of woodland.

For some time between 1066 and 1071, the estate belonged to William Malet before coming into the possession of Drew de Bevrère (rendered in some sources as Drogo of la Beuvriëre).

Rise Manor was tenanted by Franco de Fauconberg, and the Fauconbergs retained ownership until 1372 when the estate was sold to Sir John Neville by Sir Thomas Fauconberg. The estate remained in the Neville family passing down to Richard Neville, 16th Earl of Warwick, whose lands (including Rise) were seized by the crown after his death in 1471.

The estate next passed into ownership of Richard Neville's son-in-law Richard Plantagenet, Duke of Gloucester who later became Richard III of England. The estate remained a crown estate until 1628 when the house and 120 acres (0.49 km^{2}; 0.19 sq mi) of woodland were used as security for a loan from the city of London to the crown. In 1639 the grantees of the loan sold the estate to a William Raven and a Michael Evans. However they did not retain ownership long as they sold freehold in 1646 to a Thomas Bacon and Christopher Beckwith, who were buying on behalf of Hugh Bethell. At the same time as this transaction took place, Bethell himself bought out an existing leasehold on the estate. Evidence of this phase of construction was found in 2011 during restoration, when several Jacobean wood panels were discovered in what had been the estate office.

=== 19th century ===
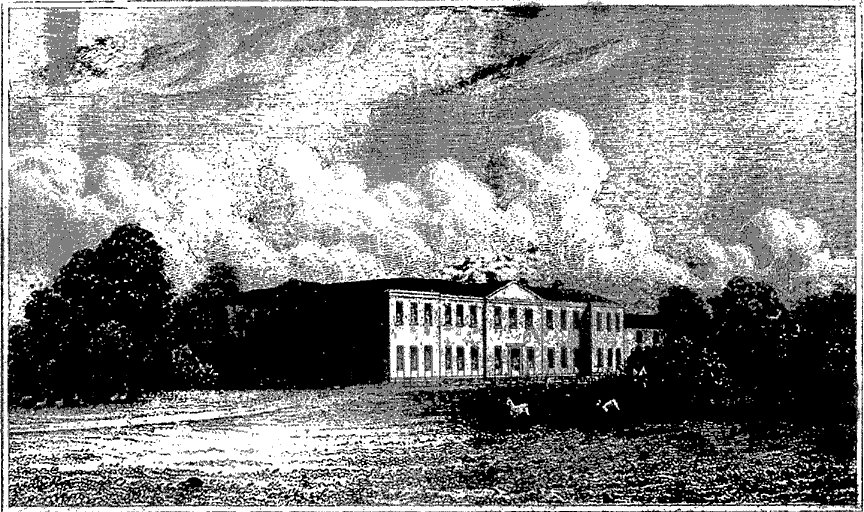
Rise Hall, from around 1820 showing the south aspect, including the wings and central pediment.

The Hall was rebuilt by Richard Bethell between 1815–20. An English Heritage report into buildings of special architectural or historic interest in Yorkshire suggested that Robert Abraham, a relation of the family, may have been the architect hired to carry out the renovation. However the Pevsner architectural guide to the Buildings of England suggests that Watson & Pritchett of York could be the architects. The house is primarily west facing, where it is fronted by a Grecian-style portico supported by pillars. The house also has north and south aspects fronted identically with a slight wing of 6 feet (1.8 m) at either end and a pediment over the central doorway. Before the purchase of the manor, the Bethell family had been buying many surrounding farms and properties, so that by 1856 the estate constituted 130 acres (0.53 km^{2}; 0.20 sq mi) land set aside for around 300 deer to roam in, 120 acres (0.49 km^{2}; 0.19 sq mi) of woodland, and 20 acres (0.081 km^{2}; 0.031 sq mi) of fish ponds. In 1995, the majority of the village of Rise was still owned by the Bethell family.

It was around this time that a clock was installed over the stable block, constructed by the clockmaker Edward John Dent, the man behind the clock movement in Big Ben in the Palace of Westminster, this was rediscovered during renovations in 2011.

By 1884 the estate contained at least one cricket pitch, because in that year it played host to what is now considered an unusual match in that the opposing team was made up of 11 brothers – the Walgates of Aldbrough. The Walgates won the match by 3 wickets.

=== 20th century ===
During the Second World War the manor served as headquarters for the operation of searchlight batteries in the local area, and accommodated the officers manning them. This is recorded by graffiti on walls inside the building that gives details of the officers stationed there. The estate also hosted a motor transport depot, positioned in a structure outside the main building. At the start of the war the whole herd of deer on the estate was killed and the park was ploughed for agricultural use; it is only since that time that the estate has been allowed to return to grass.

From 1946 until 1989, the building was used as a convent school dedicated to St. Philomena, and served as host to an order of nuns, the Canonesses Regular of St. Augustine. The school had both boarding and day students. Around 1980, the school added an extension to the east of the house, aligned with the south face, containing a gymnasium and a dining room. The order continued to use the house until 1995 to run religious retreats, holidays, weekend courses and meetings.

The Hall stables and coach house are all listed buildings.

=== 21st century ===
The Hall had fallen into disrepair before being bought in March 2001 by TV host and property expert Sarah Beeny and her husband, artist Graham Swift. The couple paid £435,000 (equivalent to £626,186 in 2018) for the property, and began restoration work on it.

Initially the couple worked on making the property watertight, by renovating the roof and guttering. The gutters had been the source of substantial problems, overflowing into the house and causing outbreaks of both wet and dry rot. To solve the problems, a lot of timber had to be replaced. The couple also had to remove many of the fixtures that existed only to serve the former convent school, such as lavatory and shower cubicles, and hardboard walls.

In November 2010, Beeny presented Beeny's Restoration Nightmare on Channel Four, showing her plans for the renovation of Rise Hall as a family home and wedding venue.

After the airing of the first series, the local council became aware of the renovation work, and raised objections that the work did not comply with planning regulations and listed building consent had not been obtained. That forced the couple to apply for retrospective planning permission and listed building consent, and make fire safety improvements. They also had to spend £12,000 applying to obtain a certificate of lawful development which recognised that the property was primarily being used as a domestic dwelling.

In carrying out the renovation, Beeny and Swift stated that they intended to restore, maintain and guarantee the survival of the property, ensuring it is protected as part of British heritage, and would create financial and employment growth through the use of contractors and materials required for its restoration. During the second series, the couple gave art students from Hull College the opportunity to gain experience by assisting in the design and construction of the family room.

In April 2019, Beeny and Swift sold Rise Hall to Daniel and Helen Gill, owners of an events and weddings business. Rise Hall continues to operate as a weddings and events venue.

== Architecture ==
The house is built of sandstone on the main fronts, and in pinkish-brown brick at the rear, on a plinth, and has hipped Welsh slate roofs. It is in the Classical style, with two storeys, and has an approximately H-shaped plan. The west front has nine bays, a moulded cornice and blocking course, and a full-height tetrastyle portico with a plain frieze and a moulded pediment. The windows are sashes, those on the ground floor with panelled aprons, and on the upper floor with stone sills. The south front has eleven bays, the middle three projecting under a pediment, and the outer bays also projecting, and to the east are further ranges. On the north front are nine bays, the outer bays projecting.

== See also ==
- Grade II* listed buildings in the East Riding of Yorkshire
- Listed buildings in Rise, East Riding of Yorkshire
