= The Unsellables (British TV series) =

British reality/game show

- Genre: Reality
- Presented by: Sofie Allsopp; John Rennie
- Country of origin: United Kingdom
- Original language: English
- No. of series: 1
- No. of episodes: 20 (list of episodes)

Production
- Executive producers: Rob Carey; Leonie Hutchinson
- Producers: NF-Cineflix; Media Productions
- Production location: England
- Running time: 30 minutes

Original release
- Network: BBC One
- Release: 11 May – 5 June 2009

Related
- The Unsellables (Canadian series)

The Unsellables is a British reality show that debuted on 11 May 2009. The television series ended on 5 June 2009. The show aired on BBC One, the television show was also distributed by the BBC. The Unsellables focuses on helping people who have troubles selling their houses. The Unsellables is a housing/building lifestyle show. The television series is based on the original Canadian version of the series.

== Production ==
The Unsellables is presented by Sofie Allsopp & John Rennie. Rob Carey & Leonie Hutchinson are the executive producers of the series. The series is filmed in the United Kingdom. The Unsellables runs for 30 minutes. The Unsellables is a UK-Canada co-production and is produced by NF-Cineflix (Unsellables UK) Inc. and Media Productions (Unsellables UK) Limited.

== Presenters ==
The show is presented by John Rennie & Sofie Allsopp. Allsopp is also a presenter of the Canadian version of the series.

== Media information ==
=== Episodes ===
This is a List of The Unsellables (UK) episodes.

Episode No.	Title	Original air date
1	Episode 1	11 May 2009
2	Episode 2	12 May 2009
3	Episode 3	13 May 2009
4	Episode 4	14 May 2009
5	Episode 5	15 May 2009
6	Episode 6	18 May 2009
7	Episode 7	19 May 2009
8	Episode 8	20 May 2009
9	Episode 9	21 May 2009
10	Episode 10	22 May 2009
11	Episode 11	25 May 2009
12	Episode 12	26 May 2009
13	Episode 13	27 May 2009
14	Episode 14	28 May 2009
15	Episode 15	29 May 2009
16	Episode 16	1 June 2009
17	Episode 17	2 June 2009
18	Episode 18	3 June 2009
19	Episode 19	4 June 2009
20	Episode 20	5 June 2009

=== International broadcasts ===
Country / Region	Network(s)	Aired	Notes	Sources
United Kingdom	BBC One	11 May 2009 – 5 June 2009	The Unsellables no longer airs on BBC One.	
Canada	HGTV; BBC Canada	11 May 2009 – 5 June 2009; 2010 – present	The Unsellables no longer airs on HGTV. BBC Canada airs reruns of the series Weekdays at 8:30 am.	
United States	HGTV		The Unsellables no longer airs on HGTV.	
Australia	LifeStyle Home		LifeStyle Home currently airs the series.	

=== DVD/Blu-ray releases ===
The Unsellables was not released on DVD.

=== Online media ===
The Unsellables was available on the BBC iPlayer until the show got cancelled. The Unsellables was also available on the online HGTV player in Canada and the US until the show got cancelled. Full episodes were also available on the iTunes Store until the series was cancelled. The series was also available on Amazon Video until 2010. People cannot currently watch this series online.

== See also ==
- The Unsellables (Original Canadian series)
- BBC One
- List of programmes broadcast by the BBC
- HGTV (Canada)
