= Holiday Showdown =

- Also known as: Holiday Showdown: Extreme (2007–09)
- Directed by: Katharine Round
- Narrated by: Dominic Coleman
- Country of origin: United Kingdom
- Original language: English
- No. of series: 5
- No. of episodes: 41

Production
- Executive producer: Nick Shearman
- Producers: Chris Kelly; Tayte Simpson (series)
- Production location: Various
- Running time: 60 minutes (inc. adverts)
- Production company: RDF Television

Original release
- Network: ITV
- Release: 30 October 2003 – 19 May 2009

Holiday Showdown is a BAFTA-nominated and Royal Television Society Award-winning reality television programme, produced by Chris Kelly for the United Kingdom independent TV production company RDF Media. It was first broadcast in 2003 on ITV in the United Kingdom.

Holiday Showdown was produced by RDF Television, part of the RDF Media Group. The executive producer was Nick Shearman, series producer was Tayte Simpson, and producer/director was Katharine Round.

The show's title music was a library piece called Heavyweight Hipster, composed by Billy Conrad and Sam Keaton.

== Synopsis ==
Holiday Showdown matches up two very different families with completely opposing ideas of what makes a good holiday and sends them away together for two weeks. The rules are non-negotiable, for each week of the holiday one of the families is in charge in their ideal holiday location. Both families have a challenge - to convince the other of the wonders of their holiday.

In 2007, Holiday Showdown was re-branded as Holiday Showdown: Extreme, but kept its original format.

=== Episodes ===
Below are some of the episodes that were broadcast between 2003 and 2009.

Holiday Locations	Families	Information
Tenerife/Lake District	Webb-Harrises / Hustwaytes	Two families sample each other's idea of the perfect holiday, starting in Tenerife where the Webb-Harrises enjoy the beer, bikinis and beaches on offer. Later the Hustwaytes, who prefer a more active break, take their counterparts mountain climbing and canoeing in the Lake District
Bristol v Thailand	Coates / Wigmores	The home-loving Coates family, who live and take their holidays in and around Bristol, play host to the globe-trotting Wigmores from Newbury. Unfortunately, a day trip to Weston-super-Mare doesn't hold much excitement for the adventurers - who have prepared a trip to far-flung Thailand in return but is definitely worth it
Algarve/Battlefields	Coppocks / Whites	The fun-loving Coppocks from Liverpool enjoy a booze-fuelled and rockstars fiesta in the Algarve while the strait-laced Whites from Sutton Coldfield prefer the delights of a historical sightseeing tour near Lisbon - and feelings run high when the two families team up to see how the other half lives.
Lech/Benidorm	Greenwoods / Barbers	The Greenwoods from Yorkshire and the Barbers from Lancashire get a taste of each other's favourite holidays. The Barbers' idea of fun is a snowboarding break in the Austrian resort of Lech, while the Greenwoods prefer a spot of karaoke in Benidorm - and before long the two families are at loggerheads over such sensitive issues as swearing, football and jogging
Canals/Butlins	Jenkins / Joneses	Mark Jenkins and his fun-loving family find the Joneses' relaxing riverboat holiday on the canals of Birmingham a little staid - not to mention wet - so shows them the delights of Butlins, where Mark's efforts to instil a more positive attitude into his guests have a remarkable and emotional effect
Bangers/Morocco	Armes / Baker	Psychologists Jonathon and Amanda Armes from Exeter take their children on a hectic banger-racing break in Skegness with the larger-than-life Baker family from Cambridgeshire - but find their company stressful and flatly refuse to accompany them to Morocco, even though it's their own favourite holiday destination
Blackpool/Dubai	Tunneys / Codrais	The Tunneys from Maidenhead quail at the thought of a noisy UK holiday when the fun-loving Codrais family from Barking, Essex, take them along on a traditional seaside break in Blackpool - perhaps a luxury trip to Dubai will convince their hosts of the joys of peace, quiet and relaxation
Brittany Surfers/Great Yarmouth Caravan	Poultons / Jones	The energetic Poultons go on a surfing holiday in Brittany with the more sedate Jones family, who then repay the favour by taking them for a leisurely break at a static caravan site in Great Yarmouth, where the emphasis is firmly on such traditional British pursuits as relaxing in the pub. Predictably, neither party is particularly enamoured with the other's choice, and much acrimony ensues
Australia/Sark	Commerford / Baches	The working-class Commerford family from Melbourne take the well-heeled Baches from Putney on a low-budget self-catering beach holiday in Australia, where both dads get into the competitive spirit. The Baches then set off for a rather more sedate break on the Channel Island of Sark, where the ostentatious luxury offends their Aussie guests
Magaluf v India	Foster / Falconer-Pughs	First of two new episodes. Reclusive Hare Krishnas the Falconer-Pughs trade their regular backpacking expedition for a holiday in the resort of Magaluf in Majorca, a popular destination for the fun-loving Foster family. While the break proves less than inspiring, a romance blossoms for one of the teenagers, and when the Fosters take their turn trekking in India, what starts as a holiday from hell becomes a life-changing journey
Shell Island/Florence	Townsends / Cox's	Two families who have never met before spend a fortnight sharing their favourite holidays. The Townsends from Solihull subject Gloucestershire's Cox family to the spartan rigours of a no-frills camping trip on remote Shell Island off the Welsh coast. Then the Coxes treat their counterparts to a tour of the artistic glories of Florence - but the cultural feast does not go down at all well
New York City/Salt Lake City	Churchers / Bells	The Churchers from Southampton like nothing better than searching for bargains amid the hustle and bustle of New York. They meet the Bells, a family of Mormons from London who spend their holidays in Salt Lake City, the spiritual home of their faith. All goes well when the two groups sample each other's schedules - until disputes about budgets, junk food and relentless tour guides threaten to spoil the atmosphere
Bordeaux/Devon	Matthews / Williams	The down-to-earth Matthews family from Selsey go on a golfing break in Bordeaux with luxury-loving Hampshire couple Chris and Maggie Williams and their kids - and later repay the favour by taking them on a back-to-basics holiday in Devon, where paintballing and quad biking are among the activities on offer. As usual, much acrimony ensues

== Controversy ==
Following the 2005 broadcast of a show in which the Coppock family took part, they stated that they were not impressed with their portrayal. Mo Coppock stated: "I think the show was edited to make us appear to be common... people wanted to stir things up between us to make it good telly".
