= The Unsellables (Canadian TV series) =

Canadian reality show

- Genre: Reality
- Written by: Tim Grimes; Sarah Sked; Jenny Tryansky
- Directed by: Catherine Annau; W.K. Davis; Danielle Kiraly; Allison Reid; Marc Simard; Karen Yarosky; Cheryl Zalameda
- Presented by: Sofie Allsopp; Anthony Sayers
- Theme music composer: Peter Warnica
- Country of origin: Canada
- Original language: English
- No. of seasons: 4
- No. of episodes: 44

Production
- Executive producers: Simon Lloyd; Kathleen Ruttan; Glen Salzman
- Producers: Katherine Buck; Lorraine Clark; Sarah Sked; John Vandervelde
- Production location: Canada
- Cinematography: Micha Dahan; Josh Power
- Editors: Gina Binetti; Ed Balevicius; Gerard Banning; Gerry Banning; Ryan Feldman; Sonia Godding; Mark Holtze; Eric Lambert; Burak Ozgan; Lindsay Ragone; Gad Reichman; Jeff Reynolds; Erinn Van Wynsberghe
- Camera setup: Multi-camera
- Running time: 30 minutes
- Production company: Cineflix

Original release
- Network: HGTV
- Release: January 1, 2009 – present

Related
- The Unsellables UK

The Unsellables is a Canadian reality television series that debuted on January 1, 2009. The show airs on HGTV. The Unsellables focuses on helping people who have trouble selling their home. There was also a British remake of the series.

== Production ==
The Unsellables was written by Tim Grimes, Sarah Sked and Jenny Tryansky. The Unsellables is presented by Sofie Allsopp and is produced by Cineflix. Peter Warnica is the theme music composer of the series. Simon Lloyd, Kathleen Ruttan and Glen Salzman are the executive producers of the series. Micha Dahan and Josh Power does the cinematography on the show. The series is directed by Catherine Annau, W.K. Davis, Danielle Kiraly, Allison Reid, Marc Simard, Karen Yarosky and Cheryl Zalameda. The series is edited by many people, this includes Gina Binetti, Ed Balevicius, Gerard Banning, Gerry Banning, Ryan Feldman, Sonia Godding, Mark Holtze, Eric Lambert, Burak Ozgan, Lindsay Ragone, Gad Reichman, Jeff Reynolds and Erinn Van Wynsberghe. Katherine Buck, Lorraine Clark, Sarah Sked and John Vandervelde are the people that produce the series.

== Episodes ==
The host of The Unsellables is Sofie Allsopp. Sofie Allsopp is also a presenter on the British version of the series. Sofie is known as a British property expert turned television presenter. In addition to hosting the British version of the series for the BBC, Sofie was formerly the property specialist on ITV’s daytime lifestyle programme This Morning. Her other television credits include More4 Channel’s Property Guide and Channel 4’s primetime special Britain’s Best & Worst Places to Live.

=== Season 1 ===
Episode No.	Title
1	A Bungalow Behind the Times
2	Potential of a Pastor's Home
3	A Plan for Patricia
4	Reining in Buyers for Ruth
5	Cosmetic Overhaul
6	From Dated to Sophisticated
7	Decor on a Deadline
8	A Homeowner's Unique Style is Too Specific to Her Taste and Not Attracting Buyers
9	Sofie Transforms a Dilapidated Downtown Home
10	A Homeowner's Pets Are Preventing Buyers From Seeing the Home's Potential
11	From Dorm Room to Delightful
12	A Home That's Buried in Clutter and Baby Accessories is Not Selling
13	A Bland and Boring Home is Upgraded to Increase Sales Potential
14	Contemporary Touches in a Sprawling Suburban Home
15	Adding Brilliance to a Bland Bungalow
16	A Home With Wild West Decor Needs to Be Reined In
17	Suiting a Home to Its Trendy Surroundings
18	A Lakefront Home Needs Upgrades to Match Its Incredible View
19	Retro 80s Decor Is Turning Off Potential Buyers of This Home
20	A Home With Edgy Decor Needs Toning Down
21	Playing Up a Home's Outdoor Spaces to Increase Its Marketing Potential
22	Modern Charm Enhances a Small Home for Sale
23	A Drab Property Is Transformed In Traditional Style to Target Buyers
24	Home Sellers Need a Profit Before Moving On
25	Adopting and Needing Action
26	One Home Too Many

=== Season 2 ===
Episode No.	Title
1	Rustic Shack Turns Into a Storybook Cottage for Quick Sale
2	Charm-free, Unsellable Home Gets a Makeover and Becomes a Hot Property
3	Newlyweds Get Complete Overhaul on Cluttered and Messy Home That Won't Sell
4	Couple Wants to Sell Home to Get Away From Noisy Neighbors
5	Homeowner Needs to Sell Bachelor Pad Now!
6	Color Challenged Home Gets Much-needed 'Wow Factor'
7	Florida Awaits, But Need to Sell First
8	Six Weeks, No Realtor, No Offers
9	Victorian Home Won't Sell Because Owner Isn't Flexible
10	Multigenerational Family Needs to Sell Their Home to Go Their Separate Ways
11	Sisters Need to Sell Home, But They're Not Taking the Right Steps
12	Condo Alternative Near Downtown Needs to Sell Quickly so Mom and Dad Can Move Closer to Grown Up Kids
13	Couple With Long Commute Needs to Sell Their Home Quickly

== Media information ==
=== International broadcast ===
Country / Region	Network(s)	Aired	Notes	Sources
Canada	HGTV; BBC Canada	January 1, 2009 – present 2010 – present	HGTV Canada currently airs the series. BBC Canada currently airs the series.	
United States	HGTV	January 1, 2009 – present	HGTV currently airs the series.	
Australia	LifeStyle Home		LifeStyle Home currently airs the series.	

=== DVD/Blu-ray releases ===
The Unsellables was not released on DVD.

=== Online media ===
In Canada and the United States, people can currently watch the series on the online HGTV video player.

=== Syndication ===
- In Canada, HGTV holds the national syndication rights, while BBC Canada hold cable rights.
- In the United States, HGTV holds all the rights.

== The Unsellables in other countries ==
- The Unsellables UK, presented by Sofie Allsopp and John Rennie, aired on BBC One.
