= Location, Location, Location =

British reality television series

- Genre: Reality
- Presented by: Kirstie Allsopp; Phil Spencer
- Country of origin: United Kingdom
- Original language: English
- No. of series: 46
- No. of episodes: 412

Production
- Running time: 60 minutes (currently; inc. adverts); 30 minutes (formerly; inc. adverts)
- Production company: IWC Media

Original release
- Network: Channel 4
- Release: 17 May 2000 – present

Location, Location, Location is a British reality property programme that has aired on Channel 4 since 17 May 2000 and is presented by Kirstie Allsopp and Phil Spencer. The show follows Allsopp and Spencer as they try to find the perfect home for a different set of buyers each week.

In 2025 the show celebrated its 25th anniversary with a dedicated night of celebratory programming with two new specials on 14 May.

== Etymology ==
A cliché used by property experts is that the three most important factors in determining the desirability of a property are "location, location, location". This tricolon appeared in print as early as 1926, though it is often incorrectly attributed to the real estate magnate Harold Samuel.

== Spin-off ==
A spin-off show, called Relocation, Relocation, began in 2003. It was based on the same format as Location, Location, Location, but each week a couple looked to buy a house, usually outside large urban areas, and also invest in a house or shop in the city, with the help of Kirstie and Phil. The series aired in the winter months, so as not to coincide with the other show. Relocation, Relocation ended in 2011 due to economic conditions making it difficult for people to buy one house, let alone two. Repeats are frequently shown on More4 and in 2022 the first series was available on All 4.

Relocation, Relocation has also been dubbed in Italian and broadcast in Italy by Lei with the name Cambio Casa (Finalmente!). An Australian version of the show, titled Relocation Relocation Australia, began in 2011, while a Danish version of the show entitled Beliggenhed Beliggenhed Beliggenhed, started in 2014.

== Criticism ==
The show has at times received criticism for a perceived focus on properties of significantly higher value than the UK average.
