= List of Laguna Beach: The Real Orange County cast members =

Laguna Beach: The Real Orange County is an American reality television series that originally aired on MTV from September 28, 2004 until November 15, 2006. The series aired three seasons and focused on the personal lives of several students attending Laguna Beach High School. Its premise was originated with Liz Gateley, while Tony DiSanto served as the executive producer.

Throughout its run, the series was led by eight (seasons 1 & 2) and nine (season 3) primary cast members, who were credited by their first names. Their storylines were largely developed by a number of supporting cast members. Its original main cast members were high school seniors Stephen Colletti, Lauren Conrad, Trey Phillips, Christina Schuller, Morgan Olsen and Lo Bosworth, and juniors Kristin Cavallari and Talan Torriero. Cavallari's friends Jessica Smith and Alex Hooser appeared as supporting cast members in the first season. Cavallari and Torriero's senior year was the focus of season two, with their classmates Smith, Alex Murrel, Taylor Cole and Jason Wahler integrated into the main cast, alongside college freshmen Colletti and Conrad. Hooser continued to appear as a supporting cast member in the second season. Bosworth, Olsen, Phillips and Schuller returned briefly in guest roles.

In the third season, Smith and Hooser were the sole returning cast members, albeit in supporting roles. The show instead focused on a new class of Laguna Beach students: juniors Kyndra Mayo, Cami Edwards (who appeared in the previous season as sophomores), Tessa Keller, Cameron Brinkman, Rocky Donatelli, Breanna Conrad (younger sister of Lauren Conrad), Lexie Contursi and Chase Johnson, and senior Kelan Hurley. Murrel, Cole, Wahler and Lauren Conrad returned briefly in guest roles.

The fourth season, titled Newport Harbor: The Real Orange County, relocated the show to Newport Beach, California and featured an entirely new cast from Newport Harbor High School, including seniors Chrissy Schwartz, Allie Stockton, Sasha Dunlap and Chase Cornwell, juniors Clay Adler and Grant Newman, and sophomore Taylor Geiney.

== Main cast members ==
Main cast (appears in opening credits)
Supporting cast (3+ episodes)
Guest cast (1–2 episodes)

Cast member	Seasons				Ref(s)
Cast member	1	2	3	4 (Note: The show was retitled as Newport Harbor: The Real Orange County for its fourth season, although later episode listings are split into two seasons (with the final four episodes titled Newport Harbor: Home for the Holidays).)	Ref(s)
Stephen Colletti	Main	Main			
Lauren "LC" Conrad	Main	Main	Guest		
Kristin Cavallari	Main	Main			
Trey Phillips	Main	Guest			
Christina Schuller	Main	Guest			
Morgan Olsen	Main	Guest			
Talan Torriero	Main	Main			
Lo Bosworth	Main	Recurring			
Jessica Smith	Recurring (Note: Credited onscreen as "Dieter's girlfriend" and "Kristin's friend".)	Main	Recurring		
Jason Wahler		Main	Guest		
Alex "M." Murrel		Main	Guest		
Taylor Cole		Main	Guest		
Tessa Keller			Main		
Cameron Brinkman			Main		
Kyndra Mayo		Guest (Note: Credited as "Sophomore".)	Main		
Raquel "Rocky" Donatelli			Main		
Breanna Conrad	Guest (Note: Credited as "LC's sister".)		Main		
Kelan Hurley			Main		
Lexie Contursi			Main		
Cami Edwards		Guest (Note: Credited as "Sophomore" and "Jason's date".)	Main		
Chase Johnson			Main		
Chrissy Schwartz				Main	
Clay Adler				Main	
Allie Stockton				Main	
Grant Newman				Main	
Sasha Dunlap				Main	
Chase Cornwell				Main	
Taylor Geiney				Main	

Cast notes

== Supporting cast members ==
Supporting cast (3+ episodes)
Guest cast (1–2 episodes)

Cast member	Onscreen title	Seasons		
Cast member	Onscreen title	1	2	3
Loren Polster	Party enthusiast (Note: Also credited as "Trey's friend", "Fashion enthusiast" and "Talan's friend".)	Recurring	Guest	
Dieter Schmitz	Stephen's "wingman" (Note: Also as "Stephen's friend" and "Jessica's ex-boyfriend".)	Recurring	Recurring	
Alex "H." Hooser	Kristin's best friend (Note: Later as simply "Kristin's friend".)	Recurring	Recurring	Recurring
Morgan "S." Souders	Kristin's friend (Note: Later as "Alex M's friend" and "Taylor's friend".)	Recurring	Recurring	
Jen Bunney	LC & Lo's friend (Note: Later as simply "LC's friend".)	Recurring	Recurring	
Sam Ferguson	Kristin's crush	Recurring	Guest	
Jonathon Bernard	Golf team captain (Note: Later as "senior speaker".)	Recurring		
Gary Samuelian	Christina's friend (Note: Later as "Kristin's friend".)	Recurring	Guest	
Kaitlyn Healey	LC's friend	Guest	Recurring	
Cedric Channels	Jason's friend		Recurring	
Casey Reinhardt	The new girl (Note: Also as "Alex M's friend" and later "LC's friend".)		Recurring	
Emily Alder	Jessica's friend		Recurring	Guest
Jeff "B." Boyle	Talan's friend (Note: Also as "Jessica's crush" and "Jessica's date".)		Recurring	
Heidi Montag	LC's friend		Recurring	
Braeden Hurley	Kelan's brother			Recurring
Nick "G." Gross	Bandmate (Note: Also as "Chase's friend".)			Recurring
Candace Siegmund	Kyndra's friend (Note: Also as "Cami's friend".)			Recurring
Tara Springer	Lexie's friend			Recurring
E.J. Gomez	Raquel/"Rocky"'s friend (Note: Also as "Alex's friend" and "Tyler's friend".)			Recurring
Nikki Dowers	Kyndra's friend (Note: Also as "Tyler's sister" and "Cami's friend".)			Recurring
Derek LeBon	Cameron's friend (Note: Also as "Kyndra's friend", "Tessa's boyfriend", "Kelan's friend" and "Tessa's ex-boyfriend".)		Cameo	Recurring
Alex Atkinson	Raquel/"Rocky"'s new boyfriend (Note: Later as simply "Raquel/"Rocky"'s boyfriend" and "Raquel/"Rocky"'s ex-boyfriend".)			Recurring
Rachel Swimmer	Lexie's friend (Note: Also as "Cami's friend".)			Recurring
Nick "W." Walker	Cameron's friend			Recurring
Tyler Dowers	Kyndra's ex-boyfriend (Note: Later as "Kyndra's boyfriend".)		Cameo	Recurring

Cast notes
