= Grubman =

Grubman is a surname. Notable people with the surname include:

- Allen Grubman, American entertainment lawyer
- Jack Grubman (born 1954), American businessman
- Lizzie Grubman (born 1971), American publicist
