= Freehand Productions =

Australian television production company

- Type: Private
- Industry: Television
- Founded: 2004
- Founder: Chris O'Mara; Peter Abbott; John Gregory
- Headquarters: Sydney
- Area served: Australia
- Services: Television production
- Website: FreehandTV.com.au

Freehand Productions (or simply Freehand) is an Australian television production company, founded in 2004 by producers John Gregory, Peter Abbott and Chris O’Mara.

Since its inception, Freehand has produced or co-produced various genres of content, including light and factual entertainment, observational documentary, specials and children's television, for Australian commercial broadcasters, public broadcasters and subscription television channels.

Notable productions include Top Gear Australia, Freshwater Blue, Missing Persons Unit, Planet Cake and Joker Poker.

== History ==
In 2007, BBC Worldwide acquired a 25% stake in Freehand Productions for a reported A$2.5 million, which was the first time BBC Worldwide purchased a stake in an existing company rather than set up their own. BBC Worldwide divested its stake to co-founder Peter Abbott in 2012.

Co-founder Chris O'Mara departed the company in 2009.

In 2010, Freehand produced the first local commission for MTV Australia, in reality show Freshwater Blue.

== Productions ==
Production credits include Planet Cake (Lifestyle Food), Matt Wright: Outback Wrangler (National Geographic Channel), Freshwater Blue (MTV), Top Gear Australia (moving from SBS to Nine Network in 2010), Dancing with the Stars (Seven Network), Bush Slam (ABC), Costa's Garden Odyssey (SBS), Missing Persons Unit (Nine Network), An Audience with Michael Parkinson (UKTV) and One Small Step: The Australian Story (BBC Knowledge and BBC HD).

In 2008, Freehand joined forces with Blink Films to produce the children's program Escape from Scorpion Island (ABC) and together were successful in securing the inaugural commission for CBeebies Australia with the magical show for pre-schoolers, Penelope K, by the way.

== Production credits ==
- Meet the Hockers (9Go!)
- A League of Their Own (Ten)
- Some Say Love - Pilot (UKTV)
- Planet Cake (Lifestyle Food)
- Matt Wright: Outback Wrangler (National Geographic Channel)
- Freshwater Blue (MTV)
- Goa Hippy Tribe (SBS)
- Penelope K, by the way (CBeebies)
- Costa's Arnhem Land Odyssey (SBS)
- Costa's Garden Odyssey Series 1 and 2 (SBS)
- Bush Slam (ABC)
- One Small Step (BBC Knowledge)
- An Audience with Michael Parkinson (UKTV)
- The Nest Series 1 and 2 (SBS).
- Escape from Scorpion Island Series 2 - 5 (with RDF for ABC and BBC)
- Top Gear Australia Series 1 and 2 (BBC Worldwide and SBS) Series 3 and 4 (BBC Worldwide and Nine Network)
- Dancing with the Stars (Seven Network)
- Missing Persons Unit Series 1 - 5 (Nine Network)
- Great Australian Homes (How To Channel)
- Owner Builder (How To Channel)
- Outback Wildlife Rescue (Seven Network and BBC Worldwide)
- The Great BBQ Challenge (XYZ Lifestyle Food)
- The 2005 and 2006 Nickelodeon Kids' Choice Awards
- Honey, We're Killing the Kids (Ten Network and BBC Worldwide)
- Skating On Thin Ice (Nine Network)
- My Restaurant Rules (Seven Network)
- Queer Eye For The Straight Guy (Ten Network)
