= IDT Spectrum =

IDT Spectrum, a subsidiary of IDT Corporation, holds and leases fixed wireless spectrum. It is the largest single holder of 39 GHz licensed auction spectrum in the United States.

== History ==
IDT Spectrum, Inc. and IDT Spectrum, LLC, are subsidiaries of IDT Corporation (NYSE: IDT), an international holding company, with interests primarily in the telecommunications and energy industries. In December 2001, IDT Corporation through its subsidiary Winstar Holdings, LLC, acquired FCC spectrum licenses and other assets from the bankruptcy estate of Winstar Communications. Winstar Holdings formed a subsidiary company, Winstar Spectrum, LLC, to hold its spectrum licenses and then caused the spectrum licenses to be assigned to it. As part of an internal corporate reorganization, in December 2004, Winstar Holdings formed IDT Spectrum, LLC, and caused Winstar Spectrum, LLC to transfer and assign to IDT Spectrum, LLC all of its FCC licenses except for six point-to-point licenses that are not used in our business. In January 2005, Winstar Holdings formed IDT Spectrum and contributed to IDT Spectrum all of its interests in IDT Spectrum, LLC, as well as other assets used in its connectivity services.

== Current Holdings ==
IDT Spectrum, LLC's primary holdings include 633 spectrum licenses in the 39 GHz range, as well as an additional 16 LMDS licenses in the 28 GHz band, making it the largest single holder of 39 GHz licensed auction spectrum in the United States.

The FCC's 39 GHz auctioned license band spectrum is primarily licensed in Economic Areas, or EAs. EAs are delineated by the Regional Analysis Division, Bureau of Economic Analysis, U.S. Department of Commerce and are based on 176 metropolitan or micropolitan statistical areas that serve as regional centers of economic activity, plus the surrounding counties that are economically related to these areas. On average, IDT Spectrum holds more than 500 MHz of spectrum in the top 200 U.S. markets (Economic Areas by population) and approximately 940 MHz of spectrum in the top 50 U.S. markets. IDT Spectrum's 39 GHz holdings–are contiguous across the United States (including Alaska, Hawaii and Puerto Rico).

In October 2010, IDT Spectrum renewed 633 of its 39 GHz licenses, which now expire in October 2020. The majority of IDT Spectrum's 28 GHz LMDS licenses expire in October 2018.

== Use of Licenses ==
Among other business activities, IDT Spectrum leases the spectrum to customers who use their own microwave equipment. The licenses held by IDT Spectrum are suited for high bandwidth point to point applications, including the needs of wireless operators to carry traffic from cell sites to network access points–referred to in the industry as backhaul.

== Management ==
The current President and CEO of IDT Spectrum is Michael Rapaport.
