= Scarred (TV series) =

2007 reality television series

- Genre: Reality television
- Created by: Nicole Perry
- Presented by: Jacoby Shaddix
- Theme music composer: Papa Roach
- Opening theme: "Alive (N' Out of Control)"
- Country of origin: United States
- Original language: English
- No. of seasons: 2
- No. of episodes: 20

Production
- Executive producers: Tony DiSanto; Liz Gateley; Bob Kusbit

Original release
- Network: MTV
- Release: April 10 – September 18, 2007

Scarred is a television program that debuted on MTV on April 10, 2007. On each episode of Scarred, several real-life risk-takers share the stories of how they were scarred or injured while attempting dangerous stunts primarily on skateboards, but occasionally on in-line skates, skis, snowboards, and bikes.

== "Scar Stories" segment ==
The show features a segment called "Scar Stories", which broadcasts videos caught on the scene of individuals dramatically injuring themselves, the wound often leaving a scar, hence the show's name. Every episode contains five stories. One example is a man trying to perform a grind but failing and tearing open his scrotum. He is one of only two people whose scar could not be shown on the show. The other was somebody who was left with a scar on his gluteal cleft.

== Season 1 special ==
Season 1's ten episodes were followed by an hour-long special called "Scarred: Worst of the Worst." On it, a countdown of the ten worst injuries, as voted by viewers of the show, were shown in the usual countdown fashion, ending with "the most fucked up clip of the season." Between videos, Jacoby gave his own quick lists on topics such as the worst screams, the weirdest ways people have described their pain, or objects that have been needed to repair the damage done to various people, such as screws, plates, and stitches. A quick montage of clips followed showing examples of the topic.

== Season 2 ==
Starting with the second and final season, they began to count down the five videos of the episode, then recapping before the episode ends with a video clip called "The Most F*cked Up Clip of the Day," which is number one on the list and usually the most stomach-turning clip of that episode. An example of such a clip is the one where a skateboarder tries grinding a rail only to slip, land his stomach on the bar, bounce off and land on his face. This ripped his small and large intestines in half and, luckily, only caused minor head injuries. Despite the serious damage to his abdomen, one surgery was all he needed, and he made a full recovery.

== Hosts ==
The show was hosted by the Papa Roach frontman Jacoby Shaddix. "Alive ('N Out of Control)" by Papa Roach is the theme song for the show. Due to Papa Roach's touring, the show stopped after 20 episodes. There were no announcements about the show's cancellation.

Andy Samberg, the star of the film Hot Rod, also hosted a special Hot Rod edition to promote the film. He was included in three out of the episode's five stunts.

== Notable guests ==
Occasionally, a celebrity is featured with his own story to tell. These include Steve-O, Tony Hawk, Jason Acuña, Andy Samberg, Morgan Wade, Kenny Hughes, and Brian Deegan. Coincidentally, Deegan's story was about an injury he'd received while appearing on another MTV show, Viva La Bam. His accident earned him the Most F*cked Up Clip of the Day.

== Disclaimer ==
Scarred, like many shows in the same genre such as Jackass or Wildboyz, provides a warning to audiences that they should not attempt the stunts or send in home videos. However, critics say that the viewers will overlook these warnings, since the show itself is a compilation of home videos of severe accidents and injuries.

The full disclaimer of the show:

Do not attempt any of these bone crunching, skin splitting stunts under any circumstances. They can cause serious injury or leave you permanently SCARRED. MTV insists that our viewers do not send in any home footage of themselves or others attempting stunts. We will not open or view submissions, so don't waste your time.

== Episodes ==
=== Season 1 (2007) ===
No.	Title	Original release date
1	"Keep Both Feet On The Ground"	April 10, 2007
Eighteen Stone Stairs - While attempting to jump a set of eighteen stairs, Cody breaks his ankle. Weekly Dose Of Stupid - Brian Franken shatters his wrist when his brother and a friend try to launch him off a homemade catapult. Balance, Balls, And Really Thick Skin - When trying to grind a hand rail, Richie Coleman splits his shin open. Rollerblade Hell Ride - After failing to land a 15-ft rail grind, Mike breaks his head open. Keep Both Feet On The Ground - Joseph Rodriguez twists his ankle straight off his leg after doing a flip.
2	"Two Elbows"	April 17, 2007
One Good Reason To Wear A Helmet - Yuri Zupancic splits his head open when he tripped during a rail grind with his rollerblades and it left him in a coma. One Last Trick - The last trick of the day turns into a nightmare for Morgan Wade, when he winds up with a hole in the side of his face after an accident on his bike. Nailed In The Nuts - Not noticing a jagged piece of metal on a rail, Mitch Goodwin falls off his skateboard while trying to grind, and lands on it, splitting his scrotum open. Railed - Kevin loses control of his skateboard while trying to complete a downhill speed-skating course, and ends up with a hole in his knee. Two Elbows - After not being able to land a trick on his skateboard after repeated attempts, Andres ended up with a broken elbow.
3	"Hit And Pop"	April 24, 2007
How Not To Do A Rail Slide - Eric Potter loses his balance when he tries to land a rail slide and winds up in the hospital with a broken arm. The Hardest Slam Ever - Tanner Hall, a professional skier, breaks both of his ankles when he tries to launch himself backwards 125 ft. What's The Worst That Could Happen? - While shooting for a video production company, Adam Johnson broke his spine, punched a lung and broke his collarbone when trying to grind a hand rail. Going Massive - In an attempt to conquer a mega ramp, Pat Duffy plunges into a near twenty foot freefall, and jackhammers his tibia into his femur, causing it to break in three places. Hit And Pop - Rollerblader Corey Ruby breaks his tibia, fibula and his ankle bone when his tries a rail-grind, fall's on the grass lockout his left front wheel and pushing all his weight on his leg.
4	"Serious Pressure Buildup"	May 1, 2007
Nowhere To Go But Down - A skater named Jad Magaziner, lands the wrong way during a jump and dislocates both his ankles. Scarred Across The Pond - Martin Gough breaks his ulna when he overshoots a rail. White As Snow - A rollerblader named Carson Rogers Grayson gets the bone of his fingers pushed through his skin after a stunt goes wrong. A Walking Corpse - Wade Vickers attempts to save himself from falling on concrete by jumping over a flight of stairs, but winds up with his leg collapsed underneath him. Serious Pressure Buildup - A power-lifter named Brian Bacher, pushes his body to its limits and broke bones in his legs, he also damaged ligaments.
5	"Scarred In Two Spots"	May 8, 2007
Pop! Then Scream! - After failing to land a rail grind on his brand new skateboard, Mason Jukes snapped his leg in two. Shooting Kneecap - Thinking that he is alright after a fall, pro-snowboarder Eddie Wall gets up only to find that his kneecap has shot out of his skin. Using Your Head - Adam "Fat Tony" Taylor's face slams into the ground when he fails to complete a rail grind. See If You Can Stomach This - Bruce Treby splits his big and small intestine, and also received cuts and trauma on his face when he tried to grind a hand rail. Scarred In Two Spots - A trick goes horribly wrong when Dean snapped his arm in half. Celebrity Scar: Steve-O; Steve-O, most notable roles in Jackass and Wildboyz, tells the story of the time when Johnny Knoxville "accidentally" stabbed him with a samurai sword.
6	"Butt-Crack Blues"	May 15, 2007
Going Big, Landing Broken - Chris's first instinct when he fell was to catch himself, but it backfired on him and ended up with a broken arm. Owning And Eating It - When Josh Surrey tried to grind a thirteen-stair banister, he destroyed his kneecap. Finger Lickin' Good - Jason Watts is a pro-quad racer who tore off his finger when he flipped over on his four-wheeler. Locked In A Box - After tearing ligaments in her knee, Sara Whalen, a professional soccer player, got an infection in it which had to be treated repeatedly. Butt-Crack Blues - After thinking he had found the perfect handrail, professional skateboarder Kenny Hughes went in crooked and landed on his butt-crack.
7	"A Scrubbing Session"	May 22, 2007
Skate Off The Pain - Rollerblader Kyle Wood was trying to grind a rail but ended up with a crack in his skull that needed to be stapled back together. Big Time F%$#-Up - Jared Dalen is a pro-skier who suffered a nasty fall on the slopes and wound up with a serious wound in his shin. Self-Stabbing - A pro-freestyle motocross rider named Kenny Bartram, landed a 75-foot gold-medal backflip wrong and wound up with his femur in his ribcage. Turning On The Internal Blender - Skater Liz Brandenberg suffered the most painful injury of her life when she ran into another skater during a competition, she ended up with a broken humerus A Scrubbing Session - Motocross rider Garrett Schull broke both of his arms when he missed a jump, the doctors told him his infections were so bad they would have to consider amputations.
8	"Cut From Ear-To-Ear"	May 29, 2007
Getting Worked - Isaiah tried to pull off a very complicated rail grind on his snowboard; unfortunately he lost his balance and wound up snapping his leg in half. Painted Nails, Broken Fibula - A pro BMX-rider named Ryan Jordan messed up a trick and wound up with a dislocated ankle and a broken fibula. Total Bull - Cory Rasch is a professional bull-rider who went down, and stayed that way after a steer stomped on his head. Hitting Pavement - Chris wanted to go to a local rollerblading competition, but wound up going to the hospital after hitting pavement and snap his arm in half. Cut From Ear-To-Ear - A motorcycle daredevil named Seth Enslow broke a bone in the front of his skull and wound up having to peel off his face to fix the break.
9	"Can You Handle This?"	June 5, 2007
Snowboard Leg-Snap - Jhorma Had snowboarding for five years, but after failing a trick, he ended up with a broken femur. So Much Crunching And Popping - A pro-dirtbike rider named Chris went for a big jump, but ended up in hospital with broken ankle and tibia, as well as a shattered femur. One Powerful Kick - Mathew was on his High School soccer team until a player on the opposite team broke his wrist while he was trying to block their shot. Can You Handle This? - Garth is a pro-snow speeder who was attempting to jump a 110-foot drop down. But he realized the jump was going to be short and bailed. He hit the ground before his speeder, breaking his leg.
10	"An Old Man's Butt"	June 12, 2007
Screaming Like A Girl - Paul was sent to the local hospital when he missed a landing on his skateboard and snapped his arm clean in half. Back Flip Shoulder Snap - BMX-rider Tom White broke his shoulder when he tried to do a backflip on his bike and didn't make it all the way around. Medieval Torture - Joseph had a chest tube inserted into his side in order to alleviate pressure on his lungs after he slammed his ribs during a skateboard trick.. Instant Flash, White Hot Light, Burning - Skier Tom had to be taken to the hospital in a helicopter after wiping out while trying to ski an expert's course, he ended with a compound fracture in his humerus An Old Man's Butt - When Rick slammed face first into the ramp, one of the pegs of his bike tore open his leg revealing a large portion of his muscles.

=== Season 2 (2007) ===
No.	Title	Original release date
11	"Alex's Bike Collapse"	July 17, 2007
#5 - Cory F***s Up His Ankle - Cory Barr was attempting to jump a set of stone stairs on his skateboard but wound up in the E.R. with a broken ankle. #4 - Joe's Skateboard Obliterates His Face - Joe Norton almost went partially blind after his skateboard smacked him in the face, hitting him in the eye. #3 - Paul Gives New Meaning To Face-Plant - When Paul Smith tries to ride up a wall on his BMX bike, he slams into it instead, breaking his jaw and knocking out some teeth. #2 - Brandon Get His Ear Clogged With Blood - When Brandon Mateer fails to land a rail slide, he busts his head open, which puts him in a coma for a week. #1 - Alex's Bike Collapse - Alex Liiv tries to jump 24 stairs, but his bike collapses underneath him shooting him off and into the concrete. Where Are They Now? - Morgan Wade; Morgan, who was featured in Episode 2, talks about an additional accident he got in after appearing on Scarred.
12	"Denys Has A Seizure"	July 27, 2007
#5 - Kevin Knocks Out Some Teeth - After Kevin Valot tried to jump from a quarter pipe into a pool, he landed short and wound up breaking his nose and losing two of his front teeth. #4 - Michael Breaks His Wrist By Landing On It - Michael Mize tried to jump a set of steps, but landed on his wrist and broke it in half. #3 - Josh Snaps His Femur In Half - Josh Ragle tried to ollie over a chain, but it caught his leg and twisted the wrong way. #2 - Zach Mutilates His Face - Zach Warden tried to ride down a railing on his BMX ride but wound up falling forward, grinding his face on the concrete and knocking out some teeth. #1 - Denys Has A Seizure - Denys Hollis was trying to pull off cross handicap to a down-rail, but missed it which resulted in him falling down on his head and going into a seizure. Mother Knows Best - Susan Coleman; Susan, mother of Rich who was featured in Episode 1, gives her son some advice on how to successfully land a 50/50 grind.
13	"Scarred, Episode 13"	August 7, 2007
#5 - Time To Get New Friends - Tyler Bursey's leg collapsed underneath him when he landed an 8-stair rail-grind incorrectly. #4 - No More Great Smile - Franco Camayo busts his lip after a botched rail grind during an inline skating competition. #3 - Try To Blame Someone Else - Cameron "CJ" Collins and his friends were all trying to firecracker a group of extended stairs at the same time when he fell forward and broke his arm. #2 - Oh God, This Is A Dream - Nathaniel Olson lands all his weight on his right leg after a botched rail grind and breaks it clean in half. #1 - Face Ripped Apart - Lee Bohin mangled his face on the ground after trying to jump a dirt ramp on a wobbly bike.
14	"Scarred, Episode 14"	September 18, 2007
#5 - First Summer Bike Riding - Eager to get out on his bike on the first day of a season, Mike MacDonald lands upper back and neck first after attempting to hit an oversized jump on a muddy track. #4 - A 100 Stitches - When Ricky Truppner tries to rail a seven stair banister, he wounds up pounding the pavement face first. #3 - Hitting The Wall - Truman Hooker tried to jump a gap between two parking lots but wound up launching himself, dislocating and fracture his wris at the same time. #2 - Wath The Hell You Were Thinking? - Patrick Cecilian received cuts on his face after an unsuccessful attempt to jump a tennis net on his BMX bike. #1 - You Love Wath You Do - Tony Hawk broke his pelvis and fracture his forehead while performing some stunts for fellow MTV show Wildboyz. He was riding without a helmet at the time. Where Are They Now? - Bruce Treby; Bruce originally split his small and large intestine on Episode 5. As soon as he healed from his accident, he tried the same rail again, but wound up with a faceplant.
15	"Unknown Title"	August 1, 2007
#5 - Bob Reagan broke his elbow attempting a rail grind. #4 - Kara Corn fell off her quad bike and broke her wrist. #3 - Josh Perkins broke his ankle in his foot after falling during a rail grind. #2 - Go faster! - Scott Masters fell off his bike, slammed his face on the ground, broke his nose and received cuts on his face and a severe trauma. #1 - Any face-helmet? - Phil Jones fell off his bike and fractured his skull and his jaw, and also busted his lip.
16	"Unknown Title"	August 1, 2007
#5 - Sarah Falcon fell off her board and broke her tibia. #4 - James Sievers received cuts on his forehead while snowboarding. #3 - Brian Hanson fell in a sludge puddle after failing a jump. He lost three teeth and also broke a bone in his chin. #2 - Casey Otto jumped on a wall with his bike, but fell on the way down. He lost a tooth and received a cut across the top of his nose. #1 - Motocross legend Brian Deegan fell off his bike. He lost a kidney, lacerated his spleen, and lost a significant amount of blood.
17	"Unknown Title"	August 1, 2007
#5 - Albie Bennett caught his bike in a chain while attempting to jump a short fence, and as a result, fell too far and injured his knuckles. #4 - Mike Franklin split his skull after a botched rail grind. #3 - Craig McCallion ripped open his intestines after misjudging a rail jump on his snowboard. #2 - Dan Pageau split his skull trying a back-side grind on celebrety skateboard rail called "El Toro". #1 - Chris Olpin messed up a rail transfer and suffered trauma to his genital area. Mother Knows Best - Nelly Goodwin Nelly, mother of Mitch who was featured in Episode 2, gives her opinion on the ollie.
18	"Unknown Title"	August 1, 2007
#5 - As if his previous stints in the emergency room weren't enough, Jared Hester added to his rap sheet when he fell off his board during a botched transfer and broke his forearm. #4 - Preston Davis fell after a mistimed BMX jump and ended up with several facial wounds. #3 - Matt Plassmann not only didn't time a BMX jump correctly, he wasn't wearing a helmet. He was concussed and he broke his neck. #2 - Dustin Durasa had a hand rail give way from under him and received a massive cut in his shin. #1 - Chester Blacksmith messed up a BMX trick involving a fence on a slight angle, he ended up with a broken leg.
19	"Unknown Title"	August 1, 2007
#5 - KC Badger broke his tibia and also his ankle bone after failing a BMX trick. #4 - Josh Suhre, who was featured in Episode 6, came back for another 15 minutes of fame when he crashed into a tree after clearing a jump. He broke his arm and collarbone. #3 - Jeremy Stenberg broke his legs after failing a motocross trick. #2 - Steve Faraone injured his genital area when he botched a rail grind. #1 - Bobby LePage suffered extensive injuries (namely a split skull, cracked ribs, and a hematoma on one of his hands) during a snowmobile race.
20	"Unknown Title"	August 1, 2007
#5 - Devin Abner broke the toes and the arch of his foot after performing an ollie. #4 - Mike Laird fell to the ground during a flip and broke a finger. #3 - Mike Hathaway wasn't wearing a helmet when he attempted a grind on a rail at a local church and smashed his skull. #2 - Chris Shivers fell off a bull at a rodeo. The bull then stomped on his leg, causing it to break. #1 - John Greene fell while attempting a rail grind, and broke his arm, leaving him with a skin graft because of the surgery. Mother Knows Best - Christine Brandenberg Christine, mother of Liz who was featured in Episode 7, gives her daughter some motherly advice.
