= Lexie Contursi =

American film and television actress

- Occupation: Actress
- Known for: Laguna Beach: The Real Orange County; Katy Perry: Part of Me; VH1 Divas 2012
- Height: 5 ft 6 in (1.68 m)

Lexie Contursi is an American dancer and actress. She starred in Laguna Beach: The Real Orange County while attending Laguna Beach High School in Laguna Beach, California. Contursi appeared in Katy Perry: Part of Me and VH1 Divas 2012.

== Early life and education ==
Contursi graduated from Laguna Beach High School in Laguna Beach, California; during her time attending this institution she starred on the third season of the television series Laguna Beach: The Real Orange County.

== Career ==
Contursi was a contestant on So You Think You Can Dance in 2010. She focused on contemporary dance style.

In 2014 Contursi was credited in an appearance she had filmed for the television series The Big Bang Theory. She was one of two guest stars credited in the episode directed by Mark Cendrowski. Her filmed scene was subsequently cut from broadcast in the final aired version of the episode. Show creator Chuck Lorre commented upon this in the vanity card at the end of the episode. He noted the inherent irony in that the episode itself dealt with character Penny's response when she learns her scene was cut from the television show NCIS. Contursi is one of the stars of Lady Ballers, a comedy film that premiered December 2023 on the Daily Wire streaming service. Newsweek stated this film "mocks transgender women competing against other women in sports".

== Personal life ==
In October 2025, Contursi announced her engagement to fellow actor Rob Mayes.

== Filmography ==
=== Film ===
Year	Film	Role	Director
2012	Katy Perry: Part of Me	Dancer (self)	Dan Cutforth, Jane Lipsitz
2014	Andy Cohen Presents: Andy Cohen Young Actor in Hollywood	Hollywood Model	
2016	La La Land	Epilogue Dancer	
2023	Lady Ballers	Dharby Gibson	Jeremy Boreing

=== Television ===
Year	Title	Role	Notes
2006	Laguna Beach: The Real Orange County	Actress	Episodes: 3.1, 3.3-3.4, 3.6-3.7, 3.9-3.10, 3.12, 3.14
2010	The Fresh Beat Band	The Musician	Episode: 2.10
2010	The Fresh Beat Band	Dancer	Episodes: 2.2, 2.11, 3.4, 3.7, 3.9, 3.18
2010	So You Think You Can Dance	Audition Contestant (self)	Episode: 7.4
2011	53rd Annual Grammy Awards	Katy Perry Dancer (self)	Directors: Louis J. Horvitz, Trevor Lawrence Jr.
2011	Macy's 4th of July Fireworks Spectacular	Dancer (self)	Executive Producer: Brad Lachman
2011	Rock in Rio	Katy Perry Dancer (self)	Episode: 4.1
2011	American Music Awards of 2011	Taylor Swift Dancer (self)	Director: Glenn Weiss
2012	Glee	Cheerio	Episode: 4.2
2012	Shake It Up	Rockette Dancer	Episode: 3.5
2012	VH1 Divas 2012	House Dancer	Director: Mary Lambert
2012	The X Factor	Dancer	Episode: 2.21
2014	The Big Bang Theory	Girl	Episode: 7.12 (Note: Lexie Contursi filmed this episode and is credited in its credits. However, her scene was cut from the aired version of the show, and this is explained by Chuck Lorre in a vanity card.)

=== Dance ===
Year	Production	Role	Director
2011	California Dreams Tour	Katy Perry Dancer (self)	Baz Halpin

== See also ==
- California Dreams Tour
- Chuck Lorre#Vanity cards
- List of American film actresses
- List of American television actresses
- List of Laguna Beach: The Real Orange County cast members
- List of Laguna Beach: The Real Orange County episodes
- Television in the United States
