= The End of Medicine =

The End of Medicine may refer to two different things:

- The End of Medicine, a book by Andy Kessler.
- A song from the album Electric Version by The New Pornographers.
