= Kelly Brady =

Kelly Brady may refer to:

- Kelly Brady (publicist)
- Kelly Brady (footballer)
