= Andy Kessler =

Andy Kessler may refer to:

- Andy Kessler (skateboarder), American skateboard pioneer
- Andy Kessler (author), author of books on business, technology, and the health field
