= American High School =

American High School or American Senior High School may refer to:

- American High School (California)
- American Senior High School (Miami-Dade County, Florida)
- American High School (film), a 2009 romantic comedy film
- American High (company), a New York production company
- American High (TV series)
