= Jason Ross =

Jason Ross may refer to:

- Jason Ross (comedian) (born 1968), Australian comedian and television presenter
- Jason Ross (writer), American writer
- Jason Ross (musician) (born 1989), American electronic music producer and DJ
- Jason Ross (politician), congressional candidate for Texas's 4th congressional district
