= Kelly Brady (publicist) =

American publicist

- Born: Kelly Brady; July 5, 1979 (age 47); San Diego, California
- Education: California State University, Chico
- Occupations: Publicist, manager, reality television personality
- Spouse: Daniel Rosen (m. 2017)
- Children: 2

Kelly Brady is an American publicist and former reality television personality. She is known for starring in PoweR Girls. She also starred in Style Network docuseries City Girl Diaries; a "real life" adaptation of "Sex in The City".

She helped publicize the careers of celebrities, such as Tinsley Mortimer, Jessica Hart, and Jessica White.

== Biography ==
She was born on July 5, 1979, in San Diego, California, to parents Elizabeth Brady and Cyndy Arvin, both of whom were in the military. She was born through donor insemination. Brady attended California State University, Chico, where she majored in Psychology and Business and was active in theater. She was an active member of the Gamma Phi Beta sorority and was the Vice President of Public Relations and Social/ Dance Chair.

After completing her studies, she moved to New York City to pursue a career in acting and modeling.

== Career ==
She started her career as an intern at Lizzie Grubman Public Relations, where she found her interest in the entertainment industry. During her internship, Grubman's PR firm was selected as the company of choice for MTV's PoweR Girls. She later gained recognition for starring in PoweR Girls as Grubman's intern. Brady remained at LGPR for eight years, eventually becoming the company's vice president. As a publicist, she managed Tinsley Mortimer and her fashion brand Winky Lux. She also appeared on The Real Housewives of New York City as her publicist. She also managed Jessica Hart and Jessica White.

In 2010, She founded her own Media Consulting Company, Brandsway Creative. In 2013, She starred in the "real life" version of HBO's "Sex in The City" on the Style Network show City Girl Diaries. She expressed concern that the show focused more on interpersonal drama than their careers. Despite this, she admitted that she went on the show to bring attention to her company.

In the aftermath of Harvey Weinstein sexual abuse cases, Brady believes that publicists need to assess the potential risk to their companies if they choose to keep or take on a client who has been accused of sexual harassment.

== Personal life ==
Brady has been married to Daniel Rosen since 2017; they have two children.
