= Sean Patrick Cannon =

American film director

- Born: December 31, 1981 (age 44); New York City, New York, United States
- Occupations: Film Director, Screenwriter, Editor, Producer
- Years active: 2006 - present

Sean Patrick Cannon (born December 31, 1981) is an American Film Director, Producer, Editor, and Screenwriter based in Sherman Oaks, California, best known for the film American High School.

== Life and career ==
Cannon was born in New York City and moved to Los Angeles, California when he was 21 years old, to attend the American Film Institute. He also studied at Franklin & Marshall College, Vassar College, Rutgers University, Princeton University, and in the UK at the University of East Anglia.

In 2007 came American High School, a feature-comedy he wrote and directed, starring Laguna Beach alum Talan Torriero, with Danity Kane's Aubrey O'Day. The movie also stars Pirates of the Caribbean's Martin Klebba and American Pie's Nikki Ziering. The film was released through Anchor Bay & acquired by Lionsgate.

From 2012 to 2013, he edited the online talent competition Internet Icon.

In 2020, after over a decade in reality television production, Cannon wrote, directed, edited, produced, & co-funded the feature film The 3rd Guest. The film released through Indican Pictures in January 2023.

Throughout 2021, Cannon was a Post-Production Producer at Riotmaker.

In 2022, Cannon joined Ignition Creative in a similar role.

Throughout this period, he served as a Post Production Supervisor for Netflix.

He left a three-year tenure as an editor at Lemonlight. He maintains a company (2cannons.com) with his wife. They produce & distribute films in China.

In 2024, Cannon became the Head of Post Production for Anastasia Beverly Hills.
