= Newport Harbor: The Real Orange County =

- Genre: Reality television; Teen drama
- Created by: Liz Gateley
- Starring: Chrissy Schwartz; Clay Adler; Allie Stockton; Grant Newman; Sasha Dunlap; Chase Cornwell; Taylor Geiney
- Narrated by: Chrissy Schwartz
- Opening theme: "Come Clean" by Hilary Duff
- Country of origin: United States
- Original language: English
- No. of seasons: 2
- No. of episodes: 12

Production
- Executive producer: Tony Disanto
- Running time: 30 minutes
- Production company: Go Go Luckey Productions

Original release
- Network: MTV
- Release: August 13, 2007 – January 2, 2008

Related
- Laguna Beach: The Real Orange County

Newport Harbor: The Real Orange County (or simply Newport Harbor) is an MTV reality television series, documenting the lives of several teenagers of affluent families in Newport Harbor, a seaside community located in Orange County, California, United States. It differs from the usual reality show in that it is structured as a traditional narrative (seen more commonly in fictionalized television dramas or soap operas) than a straightforward observant documentary style.

The series premiered on August 13, 2007, and concluded on January 2, 2008. The series was created as a successor to Laguna Beach: The Real Orange County to avoid cancelling the series for lack of a fourth season plotline. However, Newport Harbor proved to be unsuccessful and was cancelled after two seasons.

== Development ==
Laguna Beach: The Real Orange County was initially developed as a documentary of teens living in the wealthy, beachside community of the same name. The first two seasons were successful, which led to the creation of the spin-off, The Hills, though the third season's ratings took a massive dip after the original cast left the series and was replaced by a set of current high school students.

With a lack of interest in casting for the fourth season, MTV and the producers considered relocating, scouting numerous other wealthy Southern California towns, including San Marino, Anaheim Hills, Rancho Santa Fe, and Malibu before deciding to base the show in Newport Harbor, an area of the city of Newport Beach. This series was labeled a "love story show", since it seemed most of the series was based around Chrissy Schwartz and Clay Adler.

MTV decided to pull the plug on Newport Harbor due to under-performance of ratings. The show was officially cancelled on January 2, 2008.

== Cast ==
=== Main ===
- Chrissy Schwartz
- Clay Adler
- Allie Stockton
- Grant Newman
- Sasha Dunlap
- Chase Cornwell
- Taylor Geiney

=== Supporting ===
- Samantha Kuhns, Allie's friend
- Steve & Linda Schwartz, Chrissy's dad & mom
- Art & Carolyn Stockton, Allie's dad & mom
- Courtney Briglio, Chrissy & Sasha's friend
- Jasen Ruiz, Clay & Grant's friend
- Andrew Skjonsby, Clay & Grant's friend
- Matt "Krutch" Kretschmar, Chase's friend
- Kylie Cusick & Allie, Chrissy's sorority sisters
- Billy Hahn, Chrissy's friend

== Episodes ==
=== Series overview ===
Season	Episodes	Originally released	
Season	Episodes	First released	Last released
1	8	August 15, 2007	October 3, 2007
2	4	December 12, 2007	January 2, 2008

=== Season 1 (2007) ===
Filmed from February to August 2007.

No. overall	No. in season	Title	Original release date
-	-	"Get to Know the Cast"	August 13, 2007
1	1	"Crush... Interrupted"	August 15, 2007
2	2	"Pretty In Pink"	August 22, 2007
3	3	"Thrill of the Chase"	August 29, 2007
4	4	"Sealed With a Kiss"	September 5, 2007
5	5	"She's Out and I'm In?"	September 12, 2007
6	6	"The 'V' Word"	September 19, 2007
7	7	"You Are Not Replaceable"	September 26, 2007
8	8	"Nothing's Going to Be the Same"	October 3, 2007

=== Season 2: Home for the Holidays (2007–08) ===
Filmed from November to December 2007.

No. overall	No. in season	Title	Original release date
9	1	"Are We or Aren't We?"	December 12, 2007
10	2	"Caught In the Act"	December 19, 2007
11	3	"It's O-V-E... But Not R"	December 26, 2007
12	4	"All I Want for Christmas ..."	January 2, 2008

== Home media ==
The website Amazon.com had struck a deal with many companies to produce DVDs of certain shows, through the CreateSpace service. Using a concept similar to print on demand, Amazon made the discs, cover art, and disc art themselves. The complete series was released on Amazon's website on August 29, 2008, in a three disc set. Both seasons are also available for digital download on iTunes.

== See also ==
- Newport Beach, California
- The City
- Living on the Edge
- The O.C.
- Baldwin Hills
- Freshwater Blue
