= American High School (film) =

2009 film by Sean Patrick Cannon

- DVD cover
- Directed by: Sean P. Cannon
- Written by: Sean P. Cannon
- Produced by: Raquel Tolmaire
- Starring: Jillian Murray; Aubrey O'Day; Talan Torriero; Martin Klebba; Davida Williams; Brian Drolet; Alex Murrel
- Cinematography: Joe Passarelli
- Edited by: Michael Darrow
- Music by: James E. Foley
- Distributed by: Anchor Bay Entertainment
- Release date: April 7, 2009
- Running time: 86 minutes
- Country: United States
- Language: English

American High School is a 2009 American direct-to-DVD coming-of-age romantic comedy film written and directed by Sean Patrick Cannon and starring Jillian Murray, Aubrey O'Day, Talan Torriero and Martin Klebba. It was released on April 7, 2009, in the United States. Trini Lopez makes a guest appearance as the performer at the Prom.

== Plot ==
It is the final week of senior year at American High School and Gwen Adams considers divorcing her new husband Holden Adams, whom she married because her rival Hilary Weiss is also trying to be his girlfriend. She faces the problems created by Hilary's plot to become prom queen and decides to run for prom queen herself. The married couple are caught having sex by Principal Mann. The principal faces forced resignation and hatches a plan with Gwen, another teacher and some other students, to get her job back from Ms. Apple. She is later crowned Prom Queen (albeit by shredding Hilary's votes earlier), she dumps her husband and decides she is leaving town and so is now finally free of Hilary. As the film ends, Hilary is shown getting rejected by the male students because of her promiscuous behavior.

== Cast ==
- Jillian Murray as Gwen Adams
- Talan Torriero as Holden Adams
- Aubrey O'Day as Hilary Weiss
- Martin Klebba as Principal Mann
- Nikki Schieler Ziering as Ms. Apple
- Brian Drolet as Jonny Awesome
- Alex Murrel as Dixie
- Pat Jankiewicz as Mr. Seuss
- Hoyt Richards as Kip Dick
- Ashley Ann Cook as Zoey
- James E. Foley as Matt Mysterio
- Davida Williams as Trixie
- Maxie J. Santillan Jr. as Tee-Pee
- Cameron Goodman as Jo Awesome
- Madison Dylan as Candi
