= Blair Anderson (government official) =

United States government official

Blair Anderson is a United States government official who, as of 2016, is the Under Secretary for Policy in the United States Department of Transportation.

== Early life and education ==
Originally from Laguna Beach, California, Blair Anderson attended Laguna Beach High School. During high school, he played men's volleyball. He graduated with a Bachelor of Arts degree in ecology from Princeton University. At Princeton, he played intercollegiate volleyball.

== Career ==
From 2005 to 2013, Anderson served as a congressional aide in the office of United States Representative John W. Olver. Beginning in 2015, he worked as deputy administrator of the National Highway Traffic Safety Administration.

Anderson was appointed Under Secretary of Policy in the United States Department of Transportation in 2016, and confirmed by the United States Senate on July 14 of that year.

== Personal life ==
Anderson is married and has two children.
