= List of Laguna Beach: The Real Orange County episodes =

Laguna Beach: The Real Orange County, better known as simply Laguna Beach is a reality TV teen drama show that premiered and showed the lives of a cast of teenagers that consisted of mostly seniors, and some juniors, in September 2004 on MTV in the United States. After gaining popularity, the show returned for a second season. It concluded its third season in November 2006; the main cast from seasons 1 and 2 have since graduated, and season 3 began with a new cast of primarily high school juniors. The program, a reality TV series in genre, is presented in the form of a narrative, which is more common in drama series. All three seasons are presently available at the iTunes Store, in addition to the release of the first two seasons on DVD. The third season was released in the UK March 9, 2009.

== Series overview ==
Season	Episodes	Originally released	
Season	Episodes	First released	Last released
1	11	September 28, 2004	December 14, 2004
2	18	July 25, 2005	November 14, 2005
3	16	August 16, 2006	November 15, 2006

== Episodes ==
=== Season 1 (2004) ===
- Filmed from February to August 2004.

No.	Title	Original release date	Prod. code
1	"A Black & White Affair"	September 28, 2004	101
Welcome to Laguna Beach, where the life of 8 high school friends were born and raised.
2	"The Bonfire"	October 5, 2004	102
The love triangle between Stephan, Kristin and LC intensifies as each of them begin to feel the pressure.
3	"Fast Cars and Fast Women"	October 12, 2004	103
Stephen, LC, and Trey visit a fashion show in Los Angeles, where LC sees Stephen's attention turn from fashion to fashion models; Kristin's day of joyriding comes to an abrupt halt.
4	"18 Candles"	October 19, 2004	104
Morgan throws Christina an 18th-birthday party, without inviting Lo and LC; Morgan and Christina later head to New York City for their spring break trip.
5	"What Happens in Cabo"	October 26, 2004	105
At the spring break trip to Cabo, Stephen gets into a fight with Kristin, opening the door for him to hook up with LC; and matters are not improved by their staying in the same hotel.
6	"The Best Part of Breaking Up"	November 2, 2004	106
In the aftermath of events in Cabo, Kristin invites Stephen to a Blink-182 concert, hoping to reconcile; Trey, Dieter, Lo, and LC also attend the concert, and have problems of their own.
7	"The Last Dance"	November 9, 2004	107
As Prom rolls around, everyone begins to get caught up with what everyone's wearing and who's going with whom.
8	"Grin & Bear It"	November 16, 2004	108
The Seniors charter a yacht trip out to Catalina. Meanwhile, Lo has to bow out due to a family obligation.
9	"Graduation Day"	November 30, 2004	109
As graduation day is approaching, the seniors try to spend time with their families while also participating in a video documentary as they reflect on their senior year.
10	"The First to Go"	December 7, 2004	110
Finally finished with high school, the gang tries lives up their last summer together, but the reality of leaving Laguna starts to sink in.
11	"Dunzo"	December 14, 2004	111
As the summer draws to a close, Stephen must tie up some loose ends before heading off to San Francisco. Trey says his final goodbyes before moving to NYC. While Kristin begins to think about reinventing herself for her senior year.

=== Season 2 (2005) ===
- Filmed from December 2004 to August 2005.

No.	Title	Original release date	Prod. code
12	"Since You Been Gone"	July 25, 2005	201
13	"Since You Been Gone"	July 25, 2005	202
With Laguna's best and brightest away at college, a new crop of seniors rules the scene and plan to make their final year of high school count, no matter who gets hurt. Lauren, Stephen return to LB after their first semester in San Francisco. A new player blows into town: Jason.
14	"You Can't Trust Him"	August 1, 2005	203
Jessica worships Jason, but Alex H. and Kristin know he's bad news.
15	"It's Hard to Say Goodbye"	August 8, 2005	204
It's B-day time in LB for both Kristen and LC. Kristen and Talan flirt up a storm, while old feelings stir between Stephen and LC at her party south of the border.
16	"More Than Friends"	August 15, 2005	205
The drama between the seniors and juniors class gets cranked up.
17	"Winter Formal"	August 22, 2005	206
It's the Winter formal, and you can count on one thing: the drama will be hot!
18	"I Hate Valentine's Day"	August 29, 2005	207
Stephan asks an old friend to dinner, and Jason and Jessica have a disastrous dinner.
19	"Get Over Him"	September 5, 2005	208
Kristen, Alex. H, Talan and Jeff drag Jessica away from Laguna for a weekend of snowboarding in Mammoth to help her move on. Meanwhile, LC learns something about Stephen. Back in Laguna, Jason moves on to another girl.
20	"What Goes Around"	September 12, 2005	209
To bring the two cliques together, Alex H. and Alex M. organize a bonfire on the beach, however things get uncomfortable pretty fast.
21	"Cabo, Cabo, Cabo"	September 19, 2005	210
With Jason in Costa Rica for Spring break, the rest of the seniors head to Cabo for their annual Spring break , where the unexpected occurs.
22	"Lies and Goodbyes"	September 26, 2005	211
Kristen decides to visit Stephen in San Fran, but doesn't know that Talan's heart isn't the only one she's breaking.Tensions between Alex M and Casry begins to boils over.
23	"Don't Hate the Game"	October 3, 2005	212
As their tumultuous senior year is nearing an end, Jessica meets a new love interest that helps her move on. Meanwhile, in SF, LC answers a long-standing question about her and Stephen.
24	"Our Last Prom"	October 10, 2005	213
Prom time is here and Romance is in the air. Jeff decide to surprise Jessica and Alex H with a unforgettable Prom ask.
25	"Boyfriends Are Like Purses"	October 17, 2005	214
After her freshmen year of college ends, LC decides to throw a BBQ to kick off the start of summer. Kristen gets a wish of hers fulfilled.
26	"The End of the Beginning"	October 24, 2005	215
Graduation day arrives, and the seniors celebrate. LC and Jason continue their relationship.
27	"I Saw You Kiss Her"	October 31, 2005	216
LC organizes "Fight the Slide" fashion show/auction/concert benefit to raise money for recent landslide victim. It also brings back some old faces. Jason reverts back to his old ways.
28	"Nothing More to Say"	November 7, 2005	217
LC throws a farewell party before moving to LA, while also dodging Jason's attempts of apology. Summer has begun for the recent graduates, but they soon realize that it's their last.
29	"One Last Wave"	November 14, 2005	218
As their final summer draws to an end, it marks the end of an era as recent graduates begin to go for college and LC departs for L.A., and no one departs without shedding a few tears.

=== Season 3 (2006) ===
- Filmed from December 2005 to June 2006.

No.	Title	Original release date	Prod. code
30	"The Thrill of the Hunt"	August 16, 2006	301
Back on the sunny beaches of California, Laguna's next generation of juniors and seniors doesn't waste anytime ranking on the drama-meter.
31	"Who Wants to Date a Rock Star??"	August 23, 2006	302
Rocky throws Tessa a surprise birthday party but it's Chase who delivers Tessa the best present. Meanwhile, the Kyndra/Cameron relationship heats up behind Jessica's back.
32	"We're Gonna Crash a Party"	August 30, 2006	303
Christmas in Laguna heats up when Kyndra and Cami crash Rocky's holiday party. Meanwhile, Cameron gets defensive about his relationship with Jessica.
33	"Old Friends, New Crushes"	September 6, 2006	304
Breanna reaches out to her former best friend Raquel in hopes to repair their relationship, but things don't go smoothly. Meanwhile, Chase arranges for a double date so his pal Kelan can go after his long-time crush, Lexie.
34	"Kiss and Don't Tell"	September 13, 2006	305
When Tessa and Rocky travel to San Diego for a modeling gig for Tessa, Cameron decides to tag along. Sparks fly between him and Tessa, but will Jessica find out?
35	"Headed for Heartbreak"	September 20, 2006	306
It's Cameron's birthday but it's Tessa who is surprised when she realizes that Cameron has a totally different take on their hookup. Meanwhile, Kyndra rekindles her rocky romance with her ex-boyfriend, Tyler.
36	"Hook Ups and Cover-Ups"	September 27, 2006	307
Kyndra risks her relationship with Tyler when she gets a little too cozy with Cameron at Winter Formal. Will she be able to convince everyone nothing happened including Tyler’s little sister, Nikki, before she tells?
37	"Spies, Lies, and Alibis"	October 4, 2006	308
Kyndra tries to calm the rumor mill by hosting a Valentine’s Day dinner party with Tyler, but tensions flare when Cameron shows up. Meanwhile, Rocky takes it to another level with Alex on their romantic night out.
38	"First Date, Last Date"	October 11, 2006	309
In Laguna, it seems there are always new relationships sparking up as others fade away. It's no different now, as Tessa goes on a date with Cameron's friend Derek at the same time Jessica and Cameron head in different directions.
39	"It's, Like, Break-Up Season"	October 18, 2006	310
While schemers Kyndra and Cami put down Tessa and Derek's relationship, it seems there is also trouble in paradise for Raquel and Alex. After feeling pressure from Raquel, Alex decides to call it quits at the group's bonfire.
40	"The Three Day Rule"	October 25, 2006	311
Major tears erupt when Rocky and Alex see each other at a concert by Chase's band. Alex is not happy after seeing Rocky interact with other guys. Meanwhile, Tessa's new relationship starts to chill when Derek gives her the cold shoulder.
41	"Only in Cabo"	November 1, 2006	312
It's that time of year again when Laguna's students head down south of the border for surf, wave, and fun, but like always, the drama always seems to follow them.
42	"You Don't Just Get Me Back"	November 8, 2006	313
Everyone must find a date for the prom.
43	"Show Them What You've Got"	November 8, 2006	314
Open Air Stereo gives the performance of a lifetime and Rocky and Tessa snuggle up with old boyfriends.
44	"See You In A Decade"	November 15, 2006	315
45	"See You In A Decade"	November 15, 2006	316
Graduation day arrives, while some prepare to leave; others must stay. The remaining juniors begin to think about their senior year.
