= Laguna Beach High School =

Location
- 625 Park Avenue; Laguna Beach, California 92651; United States; 33°32′29″N 117°46′37″W

Information
- Type: Public high school
- Motto: Catching Waves to Success
- Established: 1934
- School district: Laguna Beach Unified School District
- Principal: Jason Allemann
- Grades: 9–12
- Enrollment: 791 (2026-2027)
- Color
- Athletics conference: CIF-SS Pacific Coast Conference
- Nickname: Breakers
- Website: lbhs.lbusd.org

Laguna Beach High School is a 4-year public high school located in Laguna Beach, California. It is the only high school in the Laguna Beach Unified School District. It is one of the smallest high schools in Orange County, made to hold 1000 students. It was established in 1934 and is accredited by the Western Association of Schools and Colleges.

== History ==
Before 1889, no high school existed in Orange county. That year Santa Ana started adding post-eighth grade courses to their regular instructional program. By 1892, the Santa Ana High School was formally accredited by the University of California as the county's first high school. Fullerton was established in 1893, Anaheim in 1898. Still, high school education was not required in California until state legislation in 1919 that mandated that all elementary school districts affiliate with a high school district by September 1921. Rather than join Santa Ana, the Laguna School District joined with four other elementary school districts to form the Tustin Union High School District. This new high school was located on the site of the current Tustin High School more than 20 miles from Laguna Beach. Laguna Beach finally established a separate high school district in 1933 and on Tuesday, September 11, 1934, Laguna Beach High School opened with an enrollment of 157 students in a new wing constructed as part of the existing Laguna Elementary School facility [1928]. In 1935, the K-5 portion of the school was relocated to a new school built across Park Avenue. North Gym opened in 1935, the 1st floor of the high school Library building opened in 1954 and the 2nd floor Science rooms were added in 1960. Dugger Gym and Guyer Field were added in 1962 and Administration was constructed in 1964 on the site of the old 1908 2-room schoolhouse. Major renovations occurred in 1993 with new classrooms, pool and a facelift. Another major remodel and expansion occurred in 2003–05. The school broke ground in 2026 on a new aquatics complex on the site of the current pool and completion is expected in late 2027.

== Student demographics ==
As of the 2023–24 school year, the ethnic makeup of the school is 71.7% White, 12.0% Hispanic, 0.8% African-American, 1.2% Filipino, 5.3% Asian, 0.0% Pacific Islander, 0.2% American Indian/Alaskan Native and 7.7% multiple/no response.

Four-year enrollment has varied from a low of 638 students in 1989–90 to a high of 1,200 in 1974–75.

== Recognition ==
Laguna was named a National Blue Ribbon School in 2008. It was also recognized as a California Distinguished School in 2007 and 2012, placing the school among the top 5% of the state.

== Athletics ==
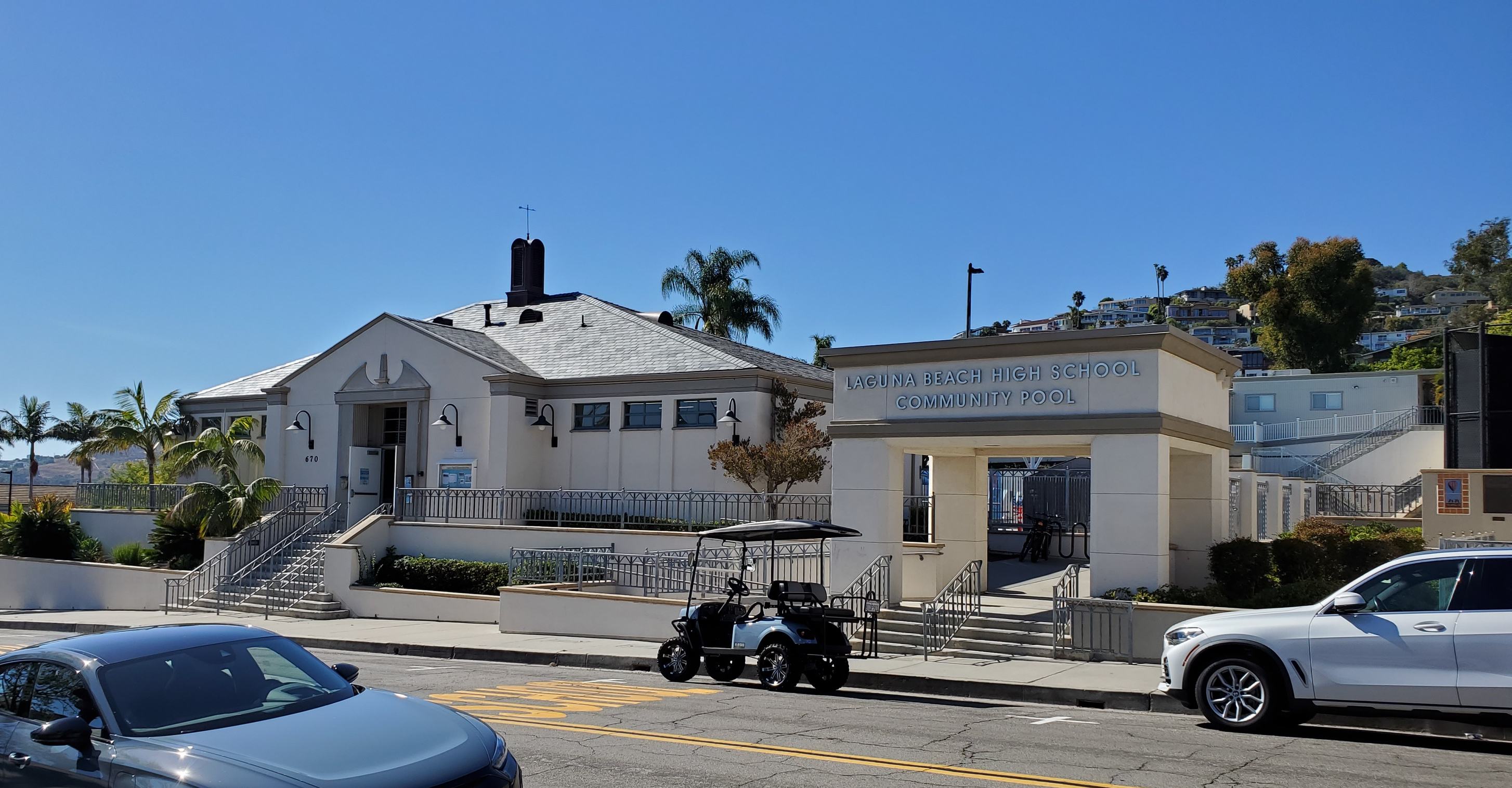
Recently demolished community poolhouse of Laguna Beach High School in California, United States

Laguna teams were originally called the Breakers but the community already had a reputation as an art colony even before the establishing of the Festival of Arts 1932 and the famous Pageant of the Masters 1935. Civic pride with Laguna's art community culminated in a student body vote on June 4, 1936, to change the nickname to "Artists" after only 19 months as the Breakers. In 2003, the student body voted to return to the "Breakers" nickname. Girls' Sports were initially under the Girls' Athletic Association with limited interscholastic competition. The Southern Section CIF initiated girls' team sport playoffs beginning with Volleyball in 1972. Boys' and Girls' league competition and sports administration were unified in 1974

Fall Sports: (With 1st CIF Season) include Football (1934) Boys' Water Polo (1964), Boys' Cross County (1961) Girls' Cross County (1974), Girls' Tennis (1974) Girls' Golf (1999) Girls' Flag Football (2023) Winter Sports: Boys' Basketball (1935), Boys' Soccer (1976), Girls' Basketball (1974), Girls' Soccer (1982), Girls' Water Polo (1998), Wrestling (2018) Spring Sports: Baseball (1938), Boys' Golf (1952), Girls Lacrosse (2018), Boys' Swimming (1962), Boys' Tennis (1935), Boys' Track (1935), Boys' Volleyball (1972), Girls' Swimming (1975), Girls' Track (1975), Softball (1982–2007, 2011–). Laguna also has a co-ed Surf team (1987) and Sand Volleyball (Girls: since Spring 2014, Boys: since Fall 2014).

Laguna Beach has success in sports until the rapid urbanization of Orange County in the late 1950s resulted in Laguna becoming the smallest public high school in the county. In Cross Country, the Breakers' boys' cross country team won the state championship in 1989, 2004, 2009 and 2018. Eric Hulst has been Laguna's only Boys' State Track champion winning the 2-mile (3200M) in 1975 and 1976 setting the State record in 1976. Rennie Durand was the Girls' 1982 State Track Champion in the 800M

Overall, the Breakers have won 52 Southern Section titles in Boys' and Girls' athletics, 8 State Regional CIF titles, and four State titles. Fourteen of the 52 section titles have been at the highest level. League affiliation for 2026-27: Football: Delta League of the Orange County Football Conference; Baseball, Beach Volleyball, Girls Lacrosse, Boys & Girls Soccer, Girls Tennis, Boys & Girls Water Polo, Wrestling: Pacific Coast League; Boys & Girls Basketball, Cross Country, Flag Football, Golf, Swimming, Boys Tennis, Track, Boys & Girls Volleyball : Pacific Hills League.

== MTV reality series ==
In 2004, MTV created a reality television show titled Laguna Beach: The Real Orange County, which aired for three seasons. The show follows the lives of several young Laguna Beach residents as they finish high school and begin the next chapter of their lives. It ran for three very successful seasons and became the second highest rated show on the network. It made Laguna alumni Lo Bosworth, Kristin Cavallari, Stephen Colletti, and Lauren Conrad into celebrities.

== Notable alumni ==
- Blair Anderson - Under Secretary for Policy in the U.S. Department of Transportation
- Damon Berryhill – Major League Baseball player
- Dain Blanton – Olympian 2000, gold medal beach volleyball
- Lo Bosworth - reality television personality
- Jason Derek Brown – one of FBI Ten Most Wanted Fugitives
- Katherine Cannon - Actress
- Kristin Cavallari - reality television personality
- Stephen Colletti - reality television personality
- Lauren Conrad - reality television personality
- Lexie Contursi - reality television personality
- Clyde Cook - president of Biola University
- Lucas Connor - musician (Younger Hunger)
- Mikal Cronin – musician and songwriter
- Tony Davia – musician (Younger Hunger)
- Annika Dries – Olympian 2012, gold medal women's water polo
- Dusty Dvorak – Olympian 1984, gold medal indoor volleyball
- Aria Fischer - Olympian 2016, 2020, gold medal women's water polo
- Makenzie Fischer - Olympian 2016, 2020, gold medal women's water polo
- Scott Fortune – Olympian 1988, gold medal indoor volleyball, 1992 bronze medal, 1996 Olympian
- David Folkenflik – media correspondent, National Public Radio
- Taylor Hawkins – drummer, member of the Foo Fighters
- Eric Hulst - distance runner
- Jun Falkenstein - Emmy and Peabody-winning Hollywood Director
- Rick Leach – tennis pro, 1990 Wimbledon doubles champion
- Billy Mohler – musician
- Tom Morey – inventor of the modern foam body board "Morey Boogie Board"
- Alex Murrel - reality television personality
- John Pitts – NFL player 1967–1975, first round draft pick - Buffalo Bills
- Casey Reinhardt - reality television personality
- Ty Segall – musician
- James Patrick Stuart – actor (All My Children)
- Reilyn Turner - soccer player
- Rachel Wacholder - model and beach volleyball player
- Paul J. Watford - United States Circuit Judge
- Alicia Leigh Willis – actress
- Nate Wood – musician
