= Winstar Communications =

American telecommunications company

- Company type: Public
- Traded as: Nasdaq: WCII
- Industry: Telecommunications
- Founded: 1993
- Founder: William J. Rouhana
- Defunct: 2001
- Fate: Liquidation via Chapter 7 bankruptcy
- Headquarters: New York, New York
- Revenue: $445.6 million (1999)
- Number of employees: 3,900 (1999)

Winstar Communications, Inc. (at some point WinStar Communications) was an American telecommunications company that provided broadband services to business customers. Winstar owned and operated a broadband network in 60 major markets in the United States, including each of the top 30 U.S. markets and ten markets internationally in Europe, Asia, and Latin America.

Winstar was a notable example of the internet and telecom bubbles of the late 1990s. At its peak in 2000, less than a year before its collapse, the company had a market capitalization in excess of $4.4 billion and revenues of $445.6 million for the year ended December 31, 1999.

Winstar also bought Fox Lorber Home Video from New Video in 1995. In 2001, Genius Products bought out Fox Lorber after Winstar was shuttered.

== History ==
The company was founded by William J. Rouhana in 1993 as a reseller of long-distance service. After winning auctions for radio spectrum, the firm became a Competitive Local Exchange Carrier and began selling wireless broadband service.

In 1994, Winstar completed an initial public offering, listing its stock on Nasdaq under the symbol "WCII". In the mid-1990s, Winstar acquired Fox Lorber Home Video.

Winstar stock soared by over 600% between 1996 and 2000 as revenue grew from $2.7 million in 1995 to over $445 million in 1999. The company also received positive research reports from analysts, such as Jack Grubman, contributing to the Global settlement.

=== Bankruptcy ===
Despite its growth, Winstar was unable to generate enough sales to cover debts from massive capital expenditures required to build out its infrastructure. Among its creditors were a number of banks and high yield bond investors as well as other large telecommunications players, including Lucent that had offered the company significant vendor financing.

Winstar filed for Chapter 11 bankruptcy protection in April 2001. The company previously laid off nearly half its work force the same month. The Chapter 11 (reorganization) cases were converted into Chapter 7 (liquidation) cases on January 24, 2002.

Private investment company Oak Point Partners acquired the remnant assets, consisting of any known and unknown assets that weren't previously administered, from the Winstar Communications, Inc., et al., Bankruptcy Estates on January 19, 2011.
