= Liz Gateley =

American television producer

Liz Gateley is an American television producer best known for creating the game-changing hit show Laguna Beach: The Real Orange County which launched on MTV in 2004. She also produced the 2020 Oscar-winning documentary Learning to Skateboard in a Warzone (If You’re a Girl). Gateley recently founded Damsel Media, a content company focused on Gen Z women. The Roku Channel recently announced commissioning a "Laguna Beach" Cast Reunion Special from Damsel Media. Prior to that, she was Head of Original Podcasts at Spotify Studios, starting in 2019 when Spotify started its podcast studio to develop and produced its own Original Podcasts. Gateley launched the video podcast What Now? with Trevor Noah, oversaw scripted podcasts including the DC Comics partnership which included Batman Unburied and Harley Quinn and The Joker: Sound Mind and produced the Webby 2020 Podcast of the Year, Wind of Change. She also oversaw TV Adaptations at Spotify, adapting the Spotify Playlist RapCaviar into a television series for Hulu as well as The Horror of Dolores Roach for Amazon Prime. Prior to Spotify, Gateley was EVP Head of Programming at Lifetime Television. At Lifetime, Gateley developed You (TV series), the scripted series starring Penn Badgley, oversaw "UnReal" and Executive Produced "Learning to Skateboard in a Warzone (If You’re a Girl)" which won an Oscar in 2020 for Best Documentary Short. She was also a founding partner and co-owner, along with Tony DiSanto, of DiGa, a studio and production company hybrid. In what Gateley describes as her "dream job", she is responsible for leading the development of new weekly and daily series for the channel including both scripted and reality projects.

Gateley is known for creating the hit reality series Laguna Beach: The Real Orange County, inspired by her childhood growing up in Palos Verdes, California. It was the first thing she pitched at MTV back in 2003, the summer in which she started, and she went on to serve as executive producer of that series as well as its spinoffs, The Hills and The City. Her next creation was 8th & Ocean, which also went on to become a hit series for MTV. During her 9 years at MTV, Gateley developed a diverse slate of hit series for the network, which most recently included Teen Mom and 16 and Pregnant, on which she also served as executive producer. Gateley has successfully expanded MTV programming to include hit shows such as The Hills, Randy Jackson Presents America's Next Best Dance Crew, The Buried Life, Rob Dyrdek's Fantasy Factory, Nitro Circus, The City, Human Giant and Run's House as well as the 2009 documentary, Britney: For the Record. She is also an executive producer for the former MTV and now, VH1 series Scream. In 2019, Gateley was appointed as Spotify's head of creative development in podcasts.

Projects in scripted development under Gateley's guidance at MTV include the series Teen Wolf, a thriller reinvention of the 1985 blockbuster film, "Awkward," and the critically acclaimed British hit series, Skins. Recent projects include two scripted comedy series, The Hard Times of RJ Berger and Warren the Ape, which aired in June 2010.

Prior to MTV and her current position at Lifetime, Gateley worked at Lifetime Television where she was responsible for the development of primetime and daytime scripted and reality original series and specials, including Strong Medicine, The Division, Intimate Portrait, and Weddings of a Lifetime. She now works as head of all programming. Before Lifetime, Gateley got her first shot in the entertainment industry while working at William Morris Agency in their agent trainee program. She is also an attorney who practiced corporate law.

Gateley graduated from Loyola Law School with a J.D. degree after earning a B. A. in Economics/Business from University of California, Los Angeles.

== Other works ==
- Scream (2015–2019) – executive producer
- Kesha: My Crazy Beautiful Life (2013) – executive producer
- The Hard Times of RJ Berger (2010) – executive producer
- Warren the Ape (2010) – executive producer
- Teen Mom (2009–2010) – executive producer
- The City (2008–2010) – executive producer
- Taking the Stage (2009–2010) – executive producer
- The Hills (2006–2010) – executive producer
- Paris Hilton's My New BFF (2008–2009) – executive producer
- Scarred (2007) – executive producer
- Maui Fever (2007) – executive producer
- Newport Harbor: The Real Orange County (2007) – executive producer
- Human Giant (2007) – executive producer
- 8th & Ocean (2006) – executive producer
- The Shop (2006) – executive producer
- Run's House (2005) – executive producer
- Stankervision (2005) – executive producer
- PoweR Girls (2005) – executive producer
- Laguna Beach: The Real Orange County (2004) – executive producer
