= Freshwater Blue =

2010 Australian reality TV series

- Genre: Reality
- Created by: Ben Alcott & Toby Yoshimura
- Directed by: Ben Alcott, Max Bourke
- Starring: Nicola Johnson; Luke Scott; Monique Sheehan; Annika Tyr-Egge; Joey Crutch; Lize Poole; Jesse Morgan; Alex Antonopolis; Rob Wentworth; Iona Frisbee (aka Twiby); Ruby Smith; Courtney Bliss
- Narrated by: Nicola Johnson
- Theme music composer: The Material
- Opening theme: "What Happens Next"
- Country of origin: Australia
- Original language: English
- No. of seasons: 1
- No. of episodes: 8

Production
- Executive producer: Toby Yoshimura
- Producer: Jayne Parker
- Production locations: Freshwater, New South Wales
- Cinematography: Ben Alcott
- Production company: Freehand Group

Original release
- Network: MTV Australia
- Release: 2 December 2010 – 20 January 2011

Freshwater Blue is an Australian reality-drama series created by Toby Yoshimura and Ben Alcott for MTV Australia. The series follows the lives of twelve friends who have completed their secondary education and face the challenges of friendship and relationship issues as well as becoming young adults. The show is set in the Northern Beaches suburb Freshwater. The show's opening theme song, "What Happens Next", was written and performed by American band The Material.

== Production ==
=== Development ===
Freshwater Blue was created by Toby Yoshimura who had previously worked as a producer for television network NBC. Yoshimura, who was trying to contrive a concept for a reality television show, acquired inspiration by a programme that was being developed in the United States, relating to Spring Break. It is also inspired by other MTV series from the US such as Laguna Beach: The Real Orange County, The Hills . Yoshimura pondered what Australian teenagers did when they finished high school and after further research came across the annual Schoolies week held in the Gold Coast. After travelling to Australia and discovering that Schoolies wasn't as untamed as Spring Break he opted to create a real life drama of what happens after school stating,

The show for me was a diary of a girl and her friends as she stumbles through[...] the most important time of her life, right after school and in between real life[...] it's real life decisions with alcohol and bikinis.

The programme was produced by production company, Freehand, and was broadcast online via the shows official website and social networking site Facebook. The show first aired on the official website on 2 March 2010 with each episode running for eight-ten minutes. On 25 October 2010 it was announced by MTV Australia that they had picked up the series with Rebecca Batties from the network stating "After seeing a webisode[..] the MTV team and I instantly loved it. We knew intrinsically that if we added MTV’s trademark production values, we could take it to a wider Australian youth audience[...]" There are no plans for a second season of this series.

== Cast ==
The cast of Freshwater Blue.

- Nicola Johnson
- Luke Scott
- Monique Sheehan
- Annika Tyr-Egge
- Joey Crutch
- Lize Poole
- Jesse Morgan
- Alex Antonopolis
- Rob Wentworth
- Emily Twiby
- Ruby Smith
- Ruth Williams
- Courtney Bliss

== Episodes ==
No.	Title	Original release date
1	"A Couple Week Break"	2 December 2010
We meet Nicola in the midst of painful break up then head back to where the story begins. As she and her friends head off for a night on the town, a jealous Rob creates a scene when he believes his girlfriend Lize, lies about a phone call.
2	"I Could Ruin Her Life" "Polar Opposites"	2 December 2010
We discover the animosity between Annika and Nicola. As polar opposites the pair can never see eye to eye. In the aftermath, Jesse and Monique try to fathom what it is about the two girls that has made them enemies.
3	"Schoolies"	9 December 2010
The gang head to schoolies week, pausing all their troubles for the fun and excitement on the Gold Coast. Jesse attempts to free himself from any major commitment to Ruby and Nick goes off the deep end after Alex comes clean about a recent fling.
4	"What Happens in Schoolies Stays in Schoolies"	16 December 2010
The group deals Nick's reaction to Alex's fling. Joey tries to cope with the fact her relationship is probably over. Will an early return from Queensland be enough to salvage Lize and Rob's relationship?
5	"He Bought a Ring the Other Day"	23 December 2010
Rob and Lize meet up for the first time in two weeks to discuss their future. Will they be prepared to turn things around? Courtney turns to Ruth for some advice. We find that even Annika has a weak spot.
6	"Grinding on Some Girl"	6 January 2011
Jesse’s Ex, Jen, is back on the scene. Jesse realises if he doesn’t say goodbye to his partying ways – he could lose her forever. A night out means Nicola has to confront another side to her long-term boyfriend Harry with disastrous results.
7	"Barbwire Balloon"	13 January 2011
Annika decides to head to Melbourne to assert her independence and heads to the tattoo parlour. Meanwhile Nicola is finding it hard to move on from Harry. Annika’s chat with her Mum leaves her more confused than ever.
8	"Good vs. Evil"	20 January 2011
It's party time! The girls organise a Dress Up party to celebrate the start of summer. And some questions are answered around Luke and Nicola's relationship.

== See also ==
- The Shire (TV series)
- Laguna Beach: The Real Orange County
- Newport Harbor: The Real Orange County
- The Hills
- The City
- Fade Street
