= Casey Reinhardt =

American model

Casey Reinhardt Brown
- Born: Casey Beau Reinhardt; July 1, 1986 (age 39); Beverly Hills, California, U.S.
- Education: Laguna Beach High School
- Alma mater: Pepperdine University
- Occupations: Television personality; actress; model; entrepreneur
- Years active: 2003–present
- Television: Laguna Beach: The Real Orange County
- Spouse: Sean Brown (m. 2016)
- Children: 3
- Relatives: Doug Reinhardt (brother)
- Website: caseyscupcake.com

Casey Beau Brown (née Reinhardt; born July 1, 1986) is an American television personality, actress, model, and entrepreneur. Born in Beverly Hills, California, she competed in numerous beauty pageants as a teenager, and later rose to prominence in 2005 after being cast in the reality television series Laguna Beach: The Real Orange County. The show documented the lives of her and her friends as they attended Laguna Beach High School. In 2009, Brown opened the bakery "Casey's Cupcakes" in the historic Mission Inn Hotel & Spa, located in Riverside, California. After winning an episode of the competition series Cupcake Wars in 2011, she opened additional locations throughout the region.

== Personal life ==
Brown was raised in Laguna Beach, California and Dana Point, California by her mother, Kelly Roberts, her late father, John Reinhardt, and her late stepfather, Duane Roberts, with her older brother Doug Reinhardt.

Brown studied Psychology and Pre-Law at Pepperdine University in Malibu, California, and is a member of the Kappa Kappa Gamma sorority. She graduated from Pepperdine University in 2010 with a degree in Psychology.

Casey was engaged to Sean Brown, the nephew of Nicole Brown Simpson, on August 12, 2015, and married him in February 2016. The wedding was attended by the children of Nicole and O. J. Simpson, who are first cousins to Sean through their late mother. They have three children together. Their daughter, Kensington Kelly, was born in August 2016, their sons, Sean Duane, born in January 2018, and Conrad Sean, born in July 2023.

== Business ventures ==
She started her own lip gloss named "Kiss By Casey", marketed on her website, in 2007.

Brown is the owner of Casey's Cupcakes, a boutique cupcake shop in Riverside, California. She opened Casey's Cupcakes in 2009 at the Mission Inn Hotel & Spa in Riverside, California. She won the "Walk of Fame" episode on Food Network's "Cupcake Wars" in 2011. Brown has said being on the show "was such a great experience, and really put me and my business on the map."

In November 2020, Brown launched the lifestyle website Luvey.

== Pageants ==
Brown has appeared in numerous beauty pageants. In 2003, she participated in the Miss California Teen USA, the Miss Orange County Teen USA (in which she was named Miss Congeniality and Miss Laguna Beach Teen USA) and the Hawaiian Tropic Teen Miss 2003 (in which she won Front Cover Girl, Photogenic Award, Personality Plus Award, Most Beautiful Hair Award, Most Beautiful Eyes Award, Best Smile Award, Best Model Award) pageants. In 2006 she competed in Miss Malibu (in which she won Most Photogenic).

== Charity work ==
In 2002, Brown founded the C.A.S.E.Y. Foundation (Children's Alliance for the Success and Education of Youth in Need), which helps promote the importance of education and the positive effects it has on building success. Brown speaks to children annually about self-esteem, education, and staying focused on their academics and extracurricular activities. She has also worked with other charities such as the Orangewood Children's Foundation, Olive Crest Children's Foundation, the Make-a Wish Foundation, the Kelly J. Roberts Private Foundation and the Riverside Humane Society Pet Adoption Center. In April 2006, she was the Honorary Youth Chair at the Black and White Ball for the Olive Crest Children's Foundation.

== Filmography ==
=== Film ===
Year	Title	Role	Notes
2010	Lure	Brooke	

=== Television ===
Year(s)	Title	Role	Notes
2005	Laguna Beach: The Real Orange County	Herself	Supporting role; 17 episodes
2009	The Hills	Herself	Lauren's friend, Doug's sister
2011	Cupcake Wars	Herself	Winner
2023	The Real Housewives of Orange County	Herself	Guest; 1 episode

=== Commercials / music videos ===
- Fun Facter, LLC commercial
- Head Automatica Music Video
