= Doug Reinhardt =

American actor and baseball player

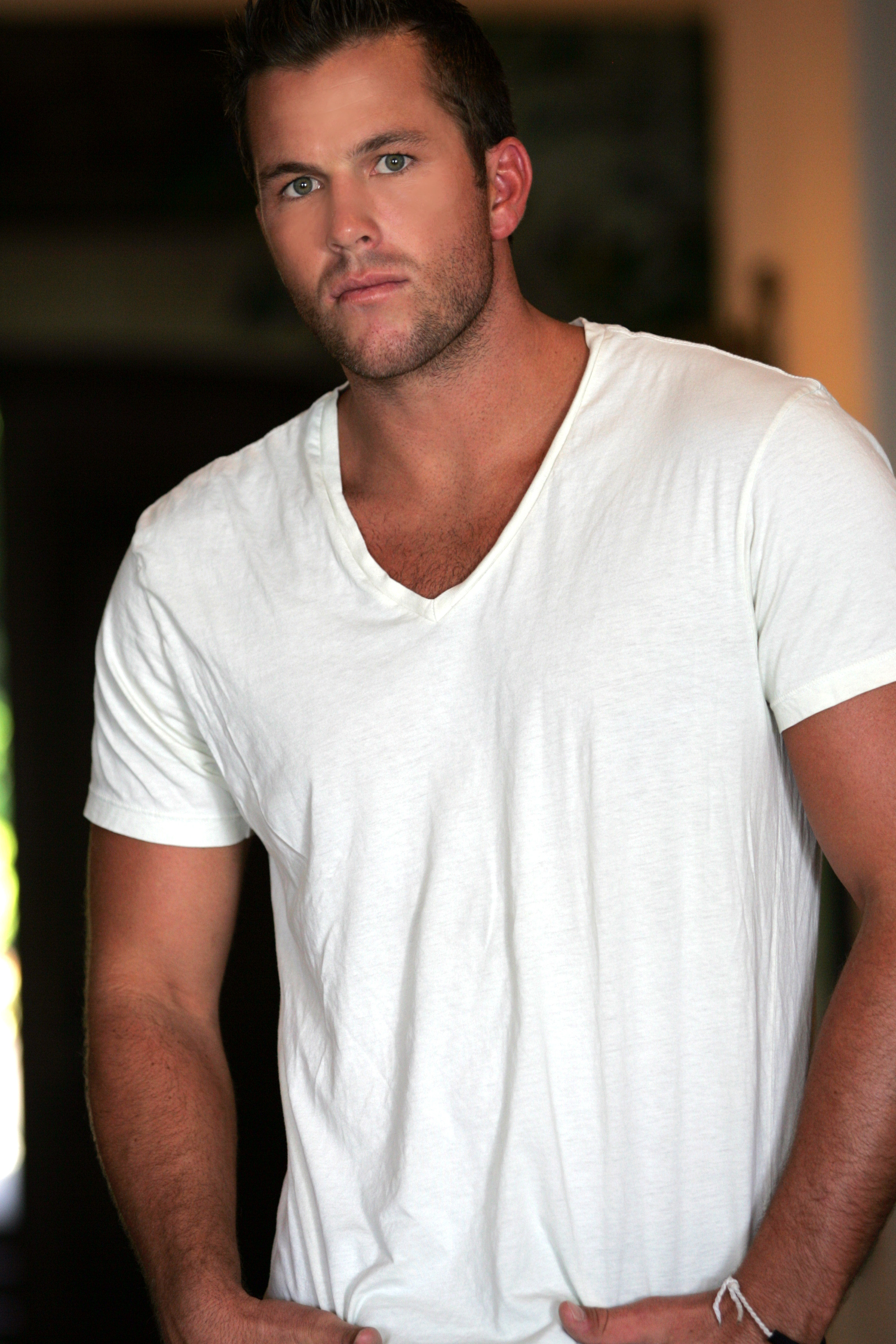
- Born: Doug Francis Reinhardt; October 22, 1985 (age 40); Torrance, California, U.S.
- Occupations: Baseball player; Sports agent; Television personality; Real Estate Developer and President of Entrepreneurial Corporate Group in Newport Beach, Ca
- Years active: 2004–present
- Television: The Hills
- Height: 6 ft 3 in (1.91 m)
- Relatives: Casey Reinhardt (sister)

Douglas Francis Reinhardt (born October 22, 1985) is an American former baseball player, sports agent, and television personality. He is best known for playing minor league baseball with the Los Angeles Angels of Anaheim and Baltimore Orioles organizations, and for his appearances on the hit television show The Hills.

== Early life ==
Reinhardt was born on October 22, 1985, in Torrance, California, to John and Kelly Reinhardt (now Kelly Roberts). He was raised in Laguna Beach, California with his sister, Casey Reinhardt, who is eight months younger. After his parents divorced, his mother married Duane Roberts, inventor of the frozen burrito and owner of the Mission Inn, a historic landmark hotel in Riverside, California.

He attended Santa Margarita Catholic High School, where he played both football and baseball. He turned down a baseball scholarship with the University of Southern California to sign with the Los Angeles Angels of Anaheim as their 10th round pick (293rd overall) out of high school. In 2008, he signed with the Baltimore Orioles and blew his knee out. His contract was up the following season.

He attended Pepperdine University as an undergraduate and was accepted to Pepperdine University School of Law before being offered the opportunity to work in baseball.

== Personal life ==
In 2013, he got engaged to Allie Lutz, who was featured on The Hills. He became a father in 2019 when he had identical twin boys with fiancé Mia Irons.

== Television appearances ==
- The Hills Recurring Season 4–5 (2008–2009)
- Paris Hilton's My New BFF (2009)
