= Living on the Edge (British TV series) =

Television series

- Country of origin: United Kingdom
- No. of series: 2
- No. of episodes: 18

Original release
- Network: MTV UK
- Release: 14 October 2007 – 2008

Living on the Edge is a British reality television show that first aired on 14 October 2007 on MTV UK. It documented the lives of several teenagers in Alderley Edge in Cheshire, a wealthy village in the North West of England. It is noted for attempting to purvey 'drama all the time'. It has been compared to the American reality television shows Laguna Beach: The Real Orange County and Newport Harbor: The Real Orange County. There are no plans for any future series.

== Overview ==
Living on the Edge is structured as a traditional narrative (seen more commonly in fictionalised television dramas or soap operas) than a straightforward observant documentary. Its slogan is "LA Lifestyle, Cheshire Postcode".

The theme tune for the show is "Shooting Star" by Air Traffic.

=== Series 1 ===
- UK premiere date: 14 October 2007
- Narrative voice: Esme Conway
- Number of episodes: 8

Participants: JUDDERS et al.

=== Series 2 ===
- UK premiere date: 12 October 2008
- Narrative voice: Rachael Zapolski
- Number of episodes: 10

Steven was the only returning participant from series 1. The new participants were: Rachael, Oz, Josh, Liv, Milly, Sasha, Jack, Owain, Sophie, Toby, Will and Matt.
