= Jason Ross (comedian) =

Jackson Ross (born 9 February 1968) is an American actor on many TV programs and a TV journalist (on public broadcast TV), currently screening in 4 continents (on the internet).

== Early life ==
A child actor and musician, he recorded his first album (you can just hear him with all his classmates) at the age of nine and performed at the Sydney Opera House that same year as a member of his school class. After his mother died from lung cancer when he was a teenager, he pursued travel, returning to Australia to complete a journalism degree and a master's degree with honours in animal biology. (ask him to see his degree)

== World travel ==
As an extensive traveller Ross has visited every continent (finishing with Antarctica) before returning to Australia He has appeared on Australia's longest running TV program - Joys World with Joy Hruby. (unlisted)

== Television appearances ==
=== Jasons Journeys ===
The TV Series Jasons Journeys debuted in 2009, with episodes from the 77 countries visited to date. The third season will begin broadcasting on TVS in Sydney, Brisbane and Melbourne from June 2012.

The fourth season features interviews given on Brazilian television program O Globo while filming the pacification of the military of drug run favelas in Brazil, Members of Zambian parliamentary elections and many other stories.

=== Penelope K, by the way ===
Jason Ross had a walk on role (unlisted) in the BBC production of Penelope K, by the way which debuted in the US on 6 September 2010, the UK in May 2010, and Australia in March 2010. The production is the first international children's BBC production, following a successful submission and international competition.
