= Vanessa Grigoriadis =

American journalist

Vanessa Maia Grigoriadis is an American journalist. Her work has been featured in The New York Times, Vanity Fair, and Rolling Stone among other publications.

== Background ==
Grigoriadis is of Greek descent and was born in New York City and raised in Upper West Side, Manhattan. When she was younger she played classical violin and danced. Grigoriadis graduated from Wesleyan University. She also spent a year studying the sociology of religion at Harvard University.

== Career ==
Grigoriadis is a generalist writer for The New York Times Magazine, and Vanity Fair. Her feature Power Girls reportedly inspired the MTV reality series PoweR Girls. Her work does not cover one specific topic. She has been working on and off for the New York magazine since she graduated from college. Here, she began working as an editorial assistant and eventually worked her way up to becoming a contributing editor at the age of 25. In 2003, she was a writer on the Style desk at the New York Times.

=== Blurred Lines ===
In 2014, Grigoriadis wrote a cover story on Emma Sulkowicz, the Columbia University student known for her play Mattress Performance.

Grigoriadis developed that as her first book, Blurred Lines: Rethinking Sex, Power, and Consent on Campus. Published in September 2017, the book is an exploration of the changing attitudes toward consent on college campuses across the United States.

== Awards and honors ==
Grigoriadis received the National Magazine Award in 2007 in profile writing for a profile of designer Karl Lagerfeld. She was nominated in 2008 for feature writing, a piece titled "Gawker and the Rage of the Creative Underclass". She was also nominated for a Mirror Award for a profile of Arianna Huffington.

== Bibliography ==
=== Books ===
- Blurred Lines: Rethinking Sex, Power, and Consent on Campus (2017)

=== Essays and reportage ===
- "Karl Lagerfeld, Boy Prince of Fashion", New York (2007 National Magazine Award winner)
- "Gawker and the Rage of the Creative Underclass", New York (2008 National Magazine Award nominee)
- "The Tragedy of Britney Spears", Rolling Stone
- "Tory Burch's Ext Factor", Vanity Fair
- "Blow Up the Box: Barry Diller's Story", New York
- "The Passion of Nicki Minaj", New York Times Magazine
- "An American Drug Lord in Acapulco", Rolling Stone
- "Hollywood's Rising Class", Vanity Fair
- "The ‘Sex Cult’ That Preached Empowerment", New York Times Magazine
