= Allen Grubman =

American entertainment lawyer

Allen J. Grubman
- Born: Crown Heights, Brooklyn, New York
- Education: City College of New York (BBA); Brooklyn Law School (JD)
- Occupation: Entertainment lawyer
- Years active: 1967–present
- Spouse: Debbie Grubman
- Children: Lizzie Grubman and Jennifer Grubman Rothenberg

Allen J. Grubman is an American entertainment lawyer.

== Early life and education ==
Grubman was born and raised in Crown Heights, in Brooklyn, New York.

He attended City College of New York, where he earned a B.B.A While attending Brooklyn Law School, where he earned a J.D., he worked in the mailroom at the William Morris Agency and as a CBS page.

== Career ==
After graduating from Brooklyn Law School in 1967, Grubman wrote to various lawyers, searching for a job. When attorney Walter Hofer agreed to meet with him, he recalled: "I didn't know what to say, so I tried to get him to like me. I said, 'I really want to work for you, but I don't come from a very wealthy family, so I can't afford to pay you very much to hire me.'" Hofer hired him to work as an associate at his music law firm for $125-per-week ($1,200 in current dollar terms).

Grubman subsequently started his own business. In the 1970s, he signed obscure disco artists who later became popular, and went on to represent a number of major stars. Grubman started a firm with fellow Brooklyn Law School graduates Paul Schindler ('71) and Arthur Indursky ('67) in 1974, and upon Schindler's departure the firm was known as Grubman Indursky & Shire. In 1982 he landed one of his biggest clients, Bruce Springsteen. His clients include superstars and top record companies and their executives. In 2005, the firm had grown to 30 attorneys.

In 1992 Business Week reported that Grubman was considered "the most powerful lawyer in the music business." In 2001, Newsweek called him "perhaps the music industry's wealthiest and most powerful attorney".

His clients have included Springsteen, Madonna, U2, John Mellencamp, Rod Stewart, Sean "Puffy" Combs, Luther Vandross, Elton John, Jennifer Lopez, Mariah Carey, and Andrew Lloyd Webber.

In May 2020, the hacker group REvil claimed to have hacked and downloaded a huge amount data from Grubman's law firm, and demanded $42 million ransom to prevent release of data. In 2022, he was inducted into the Rock and Roll Hall of Fame in the Ahmet Ertegun Award category for negotiating ground-breaking long-term agreements for his clients that allow them to maintain creative control of their work.

== Family ==
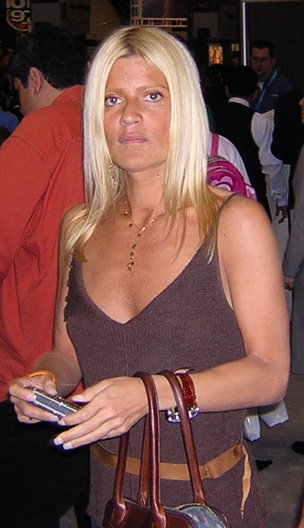
Daughter Lizzie Grubman

After graduating from law school, he met his first wife, Yvette Fischer Grubman. After 19 years of marriage, she divorced him in 1988. She died of cancer in 2001 at the age of 58.

They had two daughters, their elder being Lizzie Grubman, a celebrity publicist. Their younger daughter Jennifer Grubman Rothenberg holds a BA from Boston University and a J.D. from the Benjamin N. Cardozo School of Law, is President of Innovative Philanthropy, and is a member of the Board of Directors of Cardozo Law School.

Grubman remarried in 1991, at the New York Public Library. His second wife is Debbie Grubman (née Haimoff), a Manhattan real-estate broker. He is Jewish.
