= Planet Cake =

Australian television series

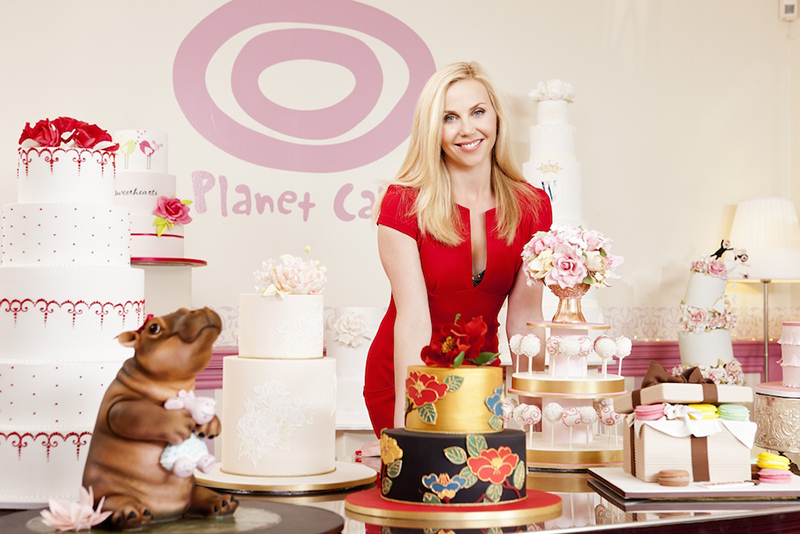
Paris Cutler at Planet Cake

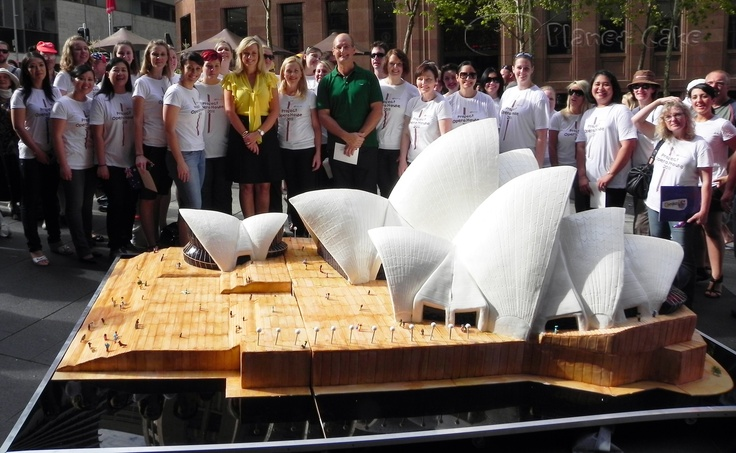
Planet Cake's famous Sydney Opera House Cake, which weighed over 1.3tons and required 32 cake decorators to make.

Planet Cake is a reality television series that follows the daily operations of one of Australia's most renowned cake businesses under the tight rein of Paris Cutler, known to her eclectic team of designers and decorators as The Cake Queen.

Paris Cutler gave up her career in the corporate world and bought Planet Cake in 2003 as an existing small store with only one staff member; she had a dream to put decorated cakes on the map both in Australia and globally and over the next 12 years made Planet Cake an internationally recognised brand.

Planet Cake has created over 12000 couture cakes, including cakes for A-list celebrities such as Nicole Kidman, Celine Dion, Rihanna, Katy Perry, Keith Urban, John Travolta and Lady Gaga to name a few, as well as for television and many magazines. They have also created a host of ‘stunt’ cakes, the most famous being a realistic replica of the Sydney Opera House for Australia Day 2011, which weighed over 1.3 tons and required 32 cake decorators to make.

In 2012, Paris and the Planet Cake team had their own TV show Planet Cake which aired on Foxtel's Lifestyle Food network; the show became one of the networks highest rating shows for the year and has now been shown in over 30 countries around the world. As a result, Planet Cake was awarded an Astra Award for Best Lifestyle Program in 2012. Paris has written four books Planet Cake a Guide for Beginners, Planet Cake Cupcakes, Planet Cake Celebrate and Planet Cake Kids all published by Murdoch Books and now translated into 7 different languages.

The Planet Cake School was launched in 2004 and provides training in cake decorating. They teach in eight locations in NSW, Australia and they also run classes in Doha, Qatar. Its courses cover a range of cake-decorating techniques, and more than 6000 students have attended its programs.

== See also ==
- List of Australian television series
- List of cooking shows
