= The Nest (Australian TV series) =

2008 Australian television series

- Genre: Observational documentary
- Developed by: Freehand Productions
- Country of origin: Australia
- Original language: English
- No. of seasons: 2
- No. of episodes: 8

Production
- Executive producer: Peter Abbott
- Producer: Paul Rudd
- Production location: Australia
- Running time: 60 minutes
- Production company: Freehand Productions

Original release
- Network: SBS
- Release: 2008 – 2009

The Nest was a 2008 Australian television series that explores adult children living with their parents. and offers insights into what a family means. Throughout the series, a financial expert and a relationship expert provided the families with guidance and support.

A second series began airing on SBS One in September 2009. The second series focuses on work/life family balance with three families who are workaholics and don't spend enough time with their kids. The series also examines long working hours. Performance expert Andrew May provides the families with revised family schedules.
