= Penelope K, by the way =

- Genre: Children's
- Created by: Michael Bourchier
- Starring: Amanda Bishop
- Voices of: Amanda Bishop (as Squirm)
- Narrated by: Amanda Bishop
- Opening theme: "Penelope K" (performed by David Collins)
- Composer: David Chapman
- Country of origin: Australia
- Original language: English
- No. of seasons: 1
- No. of episodes: 25

Production
- Executive producer: Michael Bourchier
- Running time: 12 mins
- Production companies: Blink Films; Freehand

Original release
- Network: CBeebies Australia
- Release: 21 June – 3 September 2010

Penelope K, by the way is an Australian television series for pre-school children (aged four to six). It was produced by Blink Films and Freehand and was the first-ever original commission for CBeebies Australia.

== About ==
In each episode, Penelope K (played by Amanda Bishop) is asked a general knowledge question by a child, which she answers by researching the contents and talking to characters inhabiting her Information Station.

Searching for answers she talks to her sock puppet called Squirm, a pair of fish named Hank and Frank and a shadow rabbit Tewey, while a band of musical instruments helps her find the answers through music.

== Production ==
The series was produced by much of the same team behind The Upside Down Show, David Collins performed the theme tune, Michael Bourchier was the executive producer of both shows and wanted to create a show starring Amanda Bishop, who played Mrs. Foil on The Upside Down Show and was chosen to play Penelope K. Bourchier said in a 2010 interview that he "knew she was a great physical comedian [from her work on Upside]. I conceived the idea for the show with her in mind."

== Episodes ==
- Episode 1: Rainbows
  - Through making shadows, Penelope learns that rainbows are made by light shining on rain.
- Episode 2: Tears
  - Penelope K tries to answer a question about what tears are made of.
- Episode 3: Worm
  - Penelope K investigates if worms have eyes.
- Episode 4: Biggest Animal
  - Penelope K investigates which is the world's biggest animal.
- Episode 5: Head
  - Penelope K investigates the question of how to see the back of your own head.
- Episode 6: Night
  - The probing question of what causes night really has Penelope K in a spin.
- Episode 7: Boomerang
  - Penelope K learns about boomerangs.
- Episode 8: Emu
  - Why would emus need feathers if not one of them has ever flown?
- Episode 9: Snails
  - Penelope K finds some puzzling facts when she investigates how snails get their shells.
- Episode 10: Elephant
  - Are elephants' trunks their noses, their hands or their mouths? Penelope K investigates.
- Episode 11: Dog Sniff
  - Penelope K explores a world of smells when she's asked why dogs sniff so much.
- Episode 12: Shoes
  - Penelope K and Detectives Hank and Frank investigate the mystery of a missing shoe.
- Episode 13: Milk
  - Penelope K investigates just what that delicious drink milk is and where it comes from.
- Episode 14: Tongue
  - Penelope K investigates why some people can curl their tongues and others can't.
- Episode 15: Eyebrows
  - A fact finding mission into why we have eyebrows leads Penelope K into a race.
- Episode 16: Clouds
  - To discover what clouds are made of Penelope K learns about evaporation and condensation.
- Episode 17: Butterflies
  - Penelope K discovers how butterflies can hide on leaves, bark and rocks.
- Episode 18: Egg
  - Penelope K finds conflicting information about eggs when she investigates their strength.
- Episode 19: Stars
  - Penelope K is star gazing. She tries to find out why the stars twinkle.
- Episode 20: Ants
  - Penelope K ponders how ants walk in a line and finds it has something to do with smell.
- Episode 21: Kangaroo
  - Penelope K investigates the uses of a kangaroos' pouch and gets a clue in the Know Dome.
- Episode 22: Gravity
  - Penelope K investigates why nothing flies off the Earth into space.
- Episode 23: Waves
  - Penelope K goes on a fascinating journey to discover how waves are made.
- Episode 24: Tiger
  - Penelope K pieces together the clues to discover why tigers have stripes.
- Episode 25: Wind
  - Even though wind is invisible, it's there because what it does can be seen, heard and felt
