= Andy Kessler (author) =

American businessman, investor, and author (born 1958)

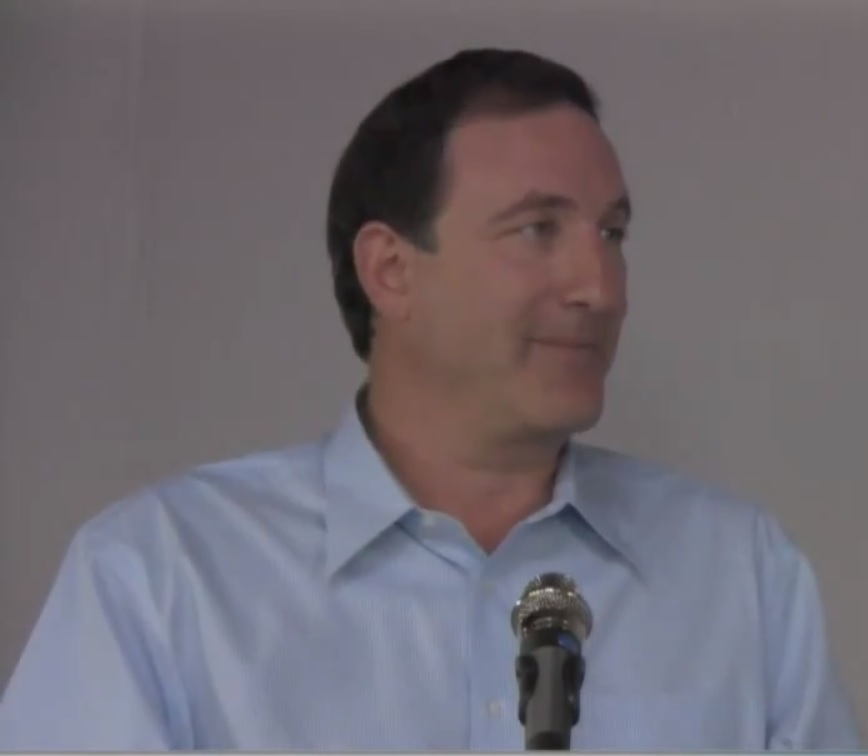
- Andy Kessler interviewed on Extraction Point in 2011
- Born: 1958 (age 67–68)
- Website: www.andykessler.com

Andy Kessler (born 1958) is an American businessman, investor, and author. He writes the "Inside View" column for The Wall Street Journal opinion page. Kessler has worked for about 20 years as a research analyst, investment banker, venture capitalist, and hedge fund manager. He has written for The Wall Street Journal, The New York Times, Wired, Forbes, The Weekly Standard, the Los Angeles Times, The American Spectator, and Thestreet.com.

== Early life ==
Raised in Bridgewater Township, New Jersey, Kessler attended Bridgewater-Raritan High School East. He has a BS in electrical engineering from Cornell University (1980) and an MSEE from the University of Illinois (1981).

== Career ==
=== Finance ===
From 1980 to 1985, Kessler worked for AT&T Bell Labs as a chip designer and programmer. In 1985, he joined Paine Webber in New York as an analyst of the electronics and semiconductor industry. In 1989, Kessler joined Morgan Stanley as a semiconductor analyst before moving to San Francisco in 1993. There he worked for Unterberg Harris as an investor, until starting Velocity Capital with Fred Kittler.

=== Writer ===
From January to March 2003, Kessler wrote and successfully self-published a book, Wall Street Meat: My Narrow Escape From the Stock Market Grinder, about working with Jack Grubman, Frank Quattrone, and Mary Meeker, after hearing that traditional publishing houses would take over a year to publish it.

Kessler's 2010 novel Grumby takes him into the world of super-hackers. The book is notable among books by well-known authors for being released first on Kindle and then in hardcover. This allowed Kessler to include a fictional cause for the flash-crash, which occurred just prior to publication, in the plot.

Among his many other writings, in an April 26, 2007 guest column in The New York Times, entitled "Trust Me", Kessler wrote in part: "There are plenty of things I don’t trust – like Wikipedia. I’ve watched my 15-year-old son and his friends take turns editing the page for the animated film 'Land Before Time,' flipping the gender of the character Littlefoot from he to she and back."

In March 2023, Kessler suggested in The Wall Street Journal that the Silicon Valley Bank "may have been distracted by diversity demands" in the lead up to its collapse.

== Awards ==
- 2019 Gerald Loeb Award for Commentary for his "Inside View" columns in The Wall Street Journal.

== Selected works ==
- Eat People and Other Unapologetic Rules for Game-Changing Entrepreneurs (2011) ISBN 1-59184-377-4
- Grumby: A Novel (2010) ISBN 0-9827163-2-X
- The End of Medicine: How Silicon Valley (And Naked Mice) Will Reboot Your Doctor (The New York Times Business Best Seller) (2006) ISBN 0-06-113029-X
- How We Got Here: A Silicon Valley and Wall Street Primer (A History of Technology and Markets) (2004) ISBN 0-9727832-2-9
- Running Money: Hedge Fund Honchos, Monster Markets and My Hunt for the Big Score (The New York Times Best Seller) (2004) ISBN 0-06-074065-5
- Wall Street Meat: My Narrow Escape from the Stock Market Grinder (Jack Grubman, Frank Quattrone, Mary Meeker, Henry Blodget and Me) (2003) ISBN 0-06-059214-1

== Personal ==
Kessler lives in California with his wife, Nancy, and four children.
