= Open Air Stereo =

- Origin: Laguna Beach, CA
- Genres: Rock
- Years active: 2001–2008, 2010–2016
- Label: Epic
- Website: http://www.openairstereo.com

Open Air Stereo is a rock band that originated in Laguna Beach, California.

== Biography ==
In early 2001, Chase Johnson, Kelan and Braeden Hurley, along with Ryah Arthur formed Stulpigeon, a band that played mostly covers of songs by groups such as Foo Fighters and Incubus. Drummer Nick Gross joined the band in 2002. In 2006, the group, now called Open Air Stereo, gained national exposure on the MTV reality show Laguna Beach: The Real Orange County. The band claims influences such as Rage Against the Machine, Muse, Incubus, Led Zeppelin and The Doors, evident in their older work, with their later work adopting a more pop punk-esque sound.

The band independently released a self-titled EP in April 2005. Following the success of their break-thru single, they signed to Epic Records. They have released two albums titled Primates and Living Proof.

== 2008-2016 ==
In March 2008, both Kelan Hurley (guitar) and Braeden Hurley (bass) left the band to pursue other passions according to the band's myspace, they have been replaced by Scott Pounds on guitar and Dan Pappas on bass.

On September 11, 2008 drummer Nick Gross posted on the group's official website this statement. "If you guys haven't noticed, Open Air Stereo has gone on an indefinite hiatus. The issues that happened remain closed to the public for the time being. OAS hopes to regroup sometime towards the end of the year, but nothing is for sure. We are very sorry to give you guys this news and we thank you all for such great support over the years. Cheers"

In October 2008, Chase Johnson was on the red carpet of Christian Audigier for Mercedes-Benz LA Fashion Week.

As of February 2009 drummer Nick Gross has joined California rapper Thrasher as part of his touring band and recorded on his EP as well. As of January 2010 Gross is no longer touring with Thrasher.

February 2010 Drummer Nick Gross is currently working with up and coming artist Lolene and is a part of her touring band.

As of March 2010 Chase Johnson has formed a new band called Hard James.

In late 2010, Chase Johnson and Nick Gross reconvened and reactivated Open Air Stereo. It also appears that Scott Pounds and Dan Pappas, who briefly replaced Kelan and Braeden Hurley right before the band's hiatus are back as well.

By 2016 "Open Air Stereo" had disbanded and Johnson and Gross had founded a new band named "Half the Animal".

== Open Air Stereo on Laguna Beach ==
The third season of Laguna Beach: The Real Orange County began filming in December 2005 and premiered in mid-August 2006. While Open Air Stereo was mentioned sparingly early in the season by the last two episodes placed a heavy emphasis on the circumstances and emotions surrounding the "band's" major-label signing with Epic Records. Members of the band have commented on how the show has affected its career trajectory. "It was always our main goal of getting on the show to gain more exposure for our band. We really cared about the show to be honest. It was weird how it all evolved. They had already been filming for a few weeks and were like "Fine, we will put your band on tv." According to Gross, "Whether it's the 'Real OC' or not, we knew it would be stupid to pass up an opportunity to reach out to more people and have them hear our "music", and we're going to make it work."

== Discography ==
Albums

- Primates (album) (2013)
- Living Proof (album)

EP

- Open Air Stereo (EP) (2005)

== Members ==
- Chase Johnson - vocals and percussion (2001–2008, 2010–Present)
- Nick Gross - drums (2001–2008, 2010–Present)
- Scott Pounds-guitar (2008,2010–Present)
- Evan Smith - bass (2011–Present)

== Former Members ==
- Kelan Hurley - guitar and vocals (2001–2008)
- Braeden Hurley - bass (2001–2008)
- Dan Pappas- bass (2008,2010–2011)
