= Tony DiSanto =

American television producer

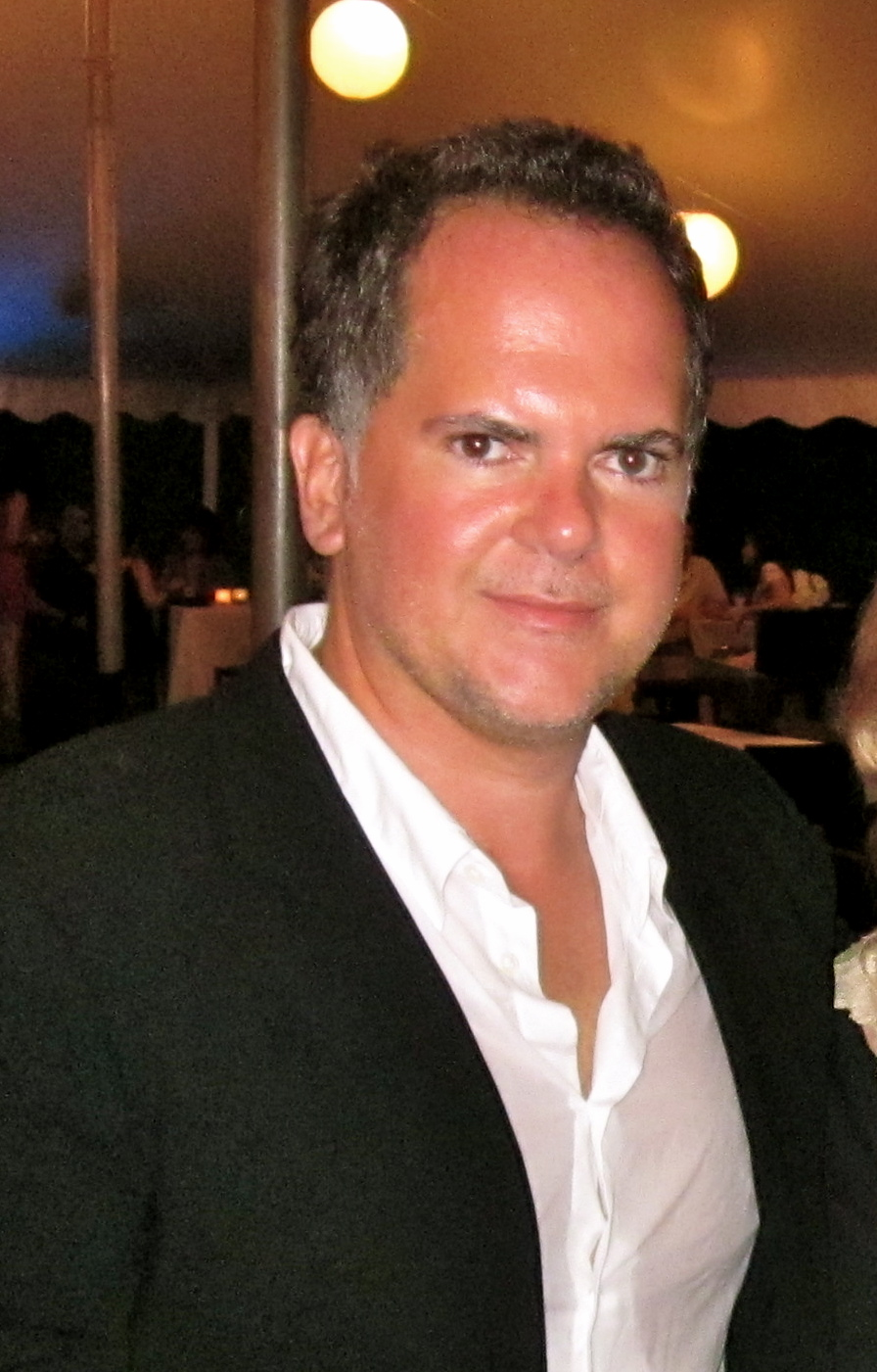
Tony DiSanto in 2010

Tony DiSanto is CEO of the Allyance Media Group, which he founded in 2018 with financier Matthew Bruderman. He also serves as President and Head of Content for DIGA Studios, which he founded with Liz Gateley in 2011. DIGA, a studio and production company hybrid, initially staked by IAC mogul Barry Diller and Electus founder Ben Silverman, was acquired by the Allyance Media Group in 2018..

From June 2009 through January 2010, DiSanto served as the President of Programming at MTV, supervising the development and production of all series, specials, and feature films for television. During his tenure as President, the network's ratings rose 30 percent with reality hits such as Teen Mom, 16 and Pregnant and Jersey Shore, three of the highest rated shows in cable television in 2010. DiSanto also ushered in a return to scripted programming at the channel with The Hard Times of RJ Berger, Teen Wolf and Skins, the latter two of which launched in 2011. Disanto is credited as an executive producer for the former MTV and now, VH1 series Scream.

DiSanto began his career as an intern at MTV. He graduated to directing commercial spots, music videos, and electronic press kits for bands. By 2003, as Head of Production, DiSanto was supervising special events as well as creating and executive producing shows. DiSanto's early efforts include creating Say What? Karaoke and Global Groove, and co-creating Total Request Live with Carson Daly.

DiSanto is a graduate of the Kanbar Institute of Film, Television and New Media of the Tisch School of the Arts at New York University.

== Other works ==
- Made (2003) – Executive producer
- Nick Cannon Presents Wild 'N Out (2005) – Executive producer
- The Shop (2006) – Executive producer
- Stankervision (2005) – Executive producer
- PoweR Girls (2005) – Executive producer
- Maui Fever (2007) – Executive producer
- Human Giant (2007) – Executive producer
- Nick Cannon Presents Short Circuitz (2007) – Executive producer
- Run's House
- 8th & Ocean
- Teen Wolf (MTV Series)
- The Andy Milonakis Show
- Laguna Beach: The Real Orange County
- The Hills
- The City (MTV Series)
- Warren the Ape
- America's Best Dance Crew
- The Ed Bassmaster Show
- Scream (MTV/VH1 Series)
- Stans
- Suburban Screams (2023) – Executive producer
