= Alex Murrel =

American singer and actress (born 1987)

- Also known as: Alex M.
- Born: Alexandra Leah Murrel; January 29, 1987 (age 39); Laguna Beach, California, United States
- Genres: Pop
- Occupations: Actress, singer, spokesperson, model, reality star
- Years active: 2003–2009
- Label: Warner
- Website: Alex's Myspace

Alexandra Leah Murrel (born January 29, 1987) is an American singer and actress. She rose to stardom in the hit MTV reality show Laguna Beach: The Real Orange County as the tough, carefree character on the show. She's now focused on her music career and has just signed to Warner Bros. Records and has released singles such as "What's It To You", "Best Friend", and "Hello", which has been featured on Laguna Beach: The Real Orange County. Now she studies at Chapman University.

In high school she was in drama club and chorus. Her first single "Hello" hit Laguna Beach radios and was featured on Laguna Beach: The Real Orange County. She performed the song at the Fight the Slide Benefit Auction. Her second single, "Best Friend", was only released once on the radio and is downloadable on iTunes. Her new songs "Now" and "What's It To You" were only released on Alex's Myspace page. Her debut album will be released this summer. Alex's song "Let It Come True" was featured in the 2009 movie American High School.

== Label drop ==
In early January 2009 Alex left her label due to company differences.

== Acting career ==
Alex made her acting debut in the comedy film American High School as Dixie, co-starring Laguna Beach co-star Talan Torriero and singer Aubrey O'Day.

=== Filmography ===
- 2005: Laguna Beach: The Real Orange County
- 2006: The Guardians
- 2009: American High School
- 2009: Action News 5
