= Lizzie Grubman =

American publicist

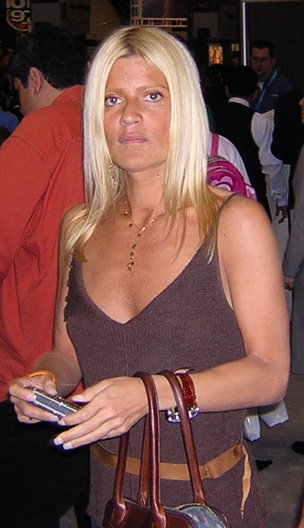
- Lizzie Grubman at the Digital Life 2005 technology convention at Javits Center in New York City.
- Born: Elizabeth Grubman; January 30, 1971 (age 55)
- Education: Northeastern University (attended, did not graduate)
- Occupations: Publicist, manager, socialite
- Spouse(s): Eric Gatoff (1995–1997); Chris Stern (2006-2020)
- Children: Harry Stern; Jack Stern
- Parent(s): Allen Grubman; Yvette Grubman

Elizabeth Grubman (born January 30, 1971) is an American publicist, manager and socialite. In 2002, Grubman served 38 days in jail for an incident where she intentionally backed a Mercedes SUV into a crowd, injuring 16 people.

== Early life ==
She is the daughter of entertainment lawyer Allen Grubman and his first wife, the late Yvette Grubman. Her parents divorced in 1988. Her mother had multiple sclerosis and died of ovarian cancer at 58 in 2001.

== Career ==
Grubman is well known as a publicist and manager. She founded her own company in 1996, and has represented Britney Spears, Jay-Z, and the Backstreet Boys.

The 2005 reality show PoweR Girls on MTV centered on a group of young publicists working for Grubman's PR firm. The title is a reference to a 1998 cover story in New York magazine that profiled Grubman and several of her rivals, noting that "Lizzie was clearly the most powerful girl of all.".

== Arrest & Trial ==
On 7 July 2001, Grubman was asked by a security guard in the Hamptons to remove her Mercedes from a fire lane. Grubman then intentionally backed her father's Mercedes-Benz SUV into a crowd of people outside of the Conscience Point Inn at 1976 North Sea Road in Southampton, New York, injuring 16 people.

Grubman was later charged in a 26-count indictment with felony crimes including second-degree assault, driving while intoxicated, and reckless endangerment. The subsequent trial garnered widespread media coverage, not only because of the particular circumstances of the crash, but because of what Richard Johnson, editor of the New York Post's Page Six, referred to as "the overreaching drama of class warfare." Grubman was alleged to have made an inflammatory statement before striking her victims with her vehicle: "Fuck you, white trash."

Later, allegations arose that she received "special treatment" at the hands of police, who did not perform a Breathalyzer test despite allegations, and later, criminal charges, that she was intoxicated at the time of the incident. In the criminal trial, Grubman faced up to eight years in prison, but served only thirty-eight days in jail and received five years' probation after reaching a plea bargain for leaving the scene of a car accident.

== Personal life ==
Grubman attended four high schools, including the New York City prep schools Horace Mann, Lenox, and Dwight. She briefly attended Northeastern University, but dropped out before completing her sophomore year.

In 1995, she married Eric Gatoff, an associate at her father's law firm. They divorced in 1997.
