= Jack Grubman =

American businessman

Jack Benjamin Grubman is an American former managing director of Salomon Smith Barney and the lead research analyst for the telecommunications sector.

== Personal life ==
He was born in Northeast Philadelphia, Pennsylvania, to Isador and Mildred Grubman, who was one of 12 children of Russian Jewish immigrants. His father worked for the City of Philadelphia Sanitation Department, while his mother worked at a home as dressmaker. He holds a bachelor's degree in mathematics (cum laude) from Boston University and a master's degree in probability theory from Columbia.

== Career ==
In 1977, he started work at AT&T. In 1985, he moved to PaineWebber. By 1994, he was making a million dollars a year and moved to Salomon Brothers. During this period, he was the most important analyst of the telecommunications industry during a time of great upward activity in the sector. In 1998 when Salomon Brothers became Salomon Smith Barney, he was the managing director and became Head of Global Telecommunications Research. As a result, Grubman became the highest paid analyst on Wall Street; earning $25 million per year from 1998 through 2002.

The sector reached a peak by 2001, however Grubman still made public statements calling for investors to buy. In March 2001, he listed ten stocks in the sector to buy of which five were selling for less than a dollar per share a year later. It was his activities during these years that led him into legal problems.

The commission found that from 1999 to 2001, Grubman had issued research reports and other documents that concealed material facts and which misled investors.

In 1999, he upgraded his opinion of AT&T stock from "neutral" to "buy". In a 2001 e-mail, Grubman explained the change was part of a plan to get his children into the 92nd Street YM-YWHA's preschool program.

Grubman was advising both telecoms firms such as Global Crossing and investors at the same time. This was an obvious conflict of interest. In April, 2003, the U.S. Securities and Exchange Commission banned Grubman from financial industry for life for misconduct. Grubman was also required to pay a $15 million fine. According to an article in Forbes, Grubman had a net worth of about $75 to $100 million after paying the fine.

In 2004, he was hired by Distinctive Devices as a consultant, a move that increased the stock price of the firm.

In 2003, he formed Magee Group, LLC. A consulting firm that specializes in advising and/or strategic consulting in both telecommunications and technology companies. Especially focusing on those companies developing enabling applications/technologies in the IP, wireless, broadband and next generation network areas.

As of August 2011, he was a managing partner at the Magee Group.
