= PoweR Girls =

- Starring: Lizzie Grubman

Original release
- Network: MTV
- Release: 2005

PoweR Girls is a 2005 MTV reality television series about press maven Lizzie Grubman mentoring a team of young hopeful publicists as they work their way in the world of celebrities, glamour and public relations to ultimately earn a permanent spot on Grubman's team (along with her respect).

== Plot ==
The show took its name from a 1998 New York Magazine cover story written by Vanessa Grigoriadis about Grubman. It followed Grubman and four young female assistants, Rachel Krupa, Ali Zweben, Kelly Brady, and Millie Monyo, doing the work of celebrity publicists in Manhattan: planning nightclub openings and album launches, mingling with celebrities and the press. The four competed for a permanent role in Lizzie Grubman Public Relations, relying on a combination of their skills and sex appeal. Grubman took the mentor role, paralleling Donald Trump in The Apprentice.

The show also featured various other characters through events, parties and day-to-day office activities. One featured character was then intern Anthony Berklich who showed-up in two of the episodes.

== Reception ==
The show debuted on MTV on March 10, 2005, to a poor response from critics. Six episodes were produced in the first season. The season finale was April 14.

As of October 2005, the New York Post reported that Grubman was said to be in talks with the various Viacom Networks to broadcast a second season of PoweR Girls, though nothing has been heard about it since.

== After filming ==
- Ali Zweben- Public Relations Manager of Intermix Boutique clothing store in Manhattan.
- Rachel Krupa - Head of Operations at the Los Angeles office of Berk Communications, Inc. and owner of her own boutique PR company, Krupa Consulting.
- Kelly Brady - continued working for Lizzie Grubman Public Relations. On September 30, 2006, she married Walter Zegers, a Manhattan investment banker, who had appeared as her boyfriend on the show.
- Millie Monyo - went on to start her own Interior Design and Event Planning Company and also works as a Public Relations Manager for Estée Lauder Global Communications.
- Anthony Berklich- went on to work at the television talk-shows "The View" and "The Daily Show with Jon Stewart".
