= Laguna Beach: The Real Orange County =

California-based reality television series in the United States

- Genre: Reality television
- Created by: Liz Gateley
- Starring: Lauren Conrad; Kristin Cavallari; Stephen Colletti; Trey Phillips; Christina Schuller; Morgan Olsen; Talan Torriero; Lo Bosworth; Jessica Smith; Alex Murrel; Jason Wahler; Taylor Cole; Tessa Keller; Chase Johnson; Raquel Donatelli; Cameron Brinkman; Kyndra Mayo; Lexie Contursi; Cami Edwards; Kelan Hurley; Breanna Conrad
- Narrated by: Lauren Conrad; Kristin Cavallari; Tessa Keller
- Opening theme: "Come Clean" by Hilary Duff
- Country of origin: United States
- Original language: English
- No. of seasons: 3
- No. of episodes: 43 (list of episodes)

Production
- Executive producer: Tony DiSanto
- Production locations: Laguna Beach, California
- Running time: 30 minutes
- Production company: Go Go Luckey Productions

Original release
- Network: MTV
- Release: September 28, 2004 – November 15, 2006

Related
- The Hills; Newport Harbor: The Real Orange County

Laguna Beach: The Real Orange County (or simply Laguna Beach) is an American reality television series that originally aired on MTV from September 28, 2004, until November 15, 2006. The series aired for three seasons and was primarily focused on the personal lives of several students attending Laguna Beach High School. Its premise was originated with Liz Gateley, while Tony DiSanto served as the executive producer.

The series was originally led by seniors Lauren Conrad, Lo Bosworth, Stephen Colletti, Morgan Olsen, Trey Phillips, Christina Schuller, and juniors Kristin Cavallari and Talan Torriero. The second season saw the additions of Jason Wahler, Taylor Cole, Alex Murrel and Jessica Smith. Upon its conclusion, all cast members departed from the series and were replaced by a group of current students. The third season was led by Cameron Brinkman, Tessa Keller, Breanna Conrad, Lexie Contursi, Raquel Donatelli, Cami Edwards, Kelan Hurley, Chase Johnson, and Kyndra Mayo.

== Conception ==
Created by Liz Gateley in 2004, Laguna Beach was originally planned to document the on-campus lives of a group of students as they completed their secondary education at Laguna Beach High School. However, after an incident during the halftime show of Super Bowl XXXVIII briefly exposed the breast of performer Janet Jackson, the school board questioned if the same network that produced the halftime show held the care necessary to operate in an academic setting. Subsequently, their contract was ended, effectively jeopardizing the feasibility of the series' concept.

Throughout its run, the series was led by eight (seasons 1–2), and nine (season 3) primary cast members, who were credited by their first names. Its original main cast members were Lauren Conrad, Kristin Cavallari, Stephen Colletti, Lo Bosworth, Morgan Olsen, Trey Phillips, Christina Schuller, and Talan Torriero. The second season saw the additions of Taylor Cole, Alex Murrel, Jessica Smith, and Jason Wahler. By the conclusion of season 2, all the first generation of students had graduated high school, and departed the series before production of the third season began. Consequently, the program was revamped to showcase an entirely new group of current students; it did not pan out like the previous two seasons as the audiences felt no connection to the new cast.

=== Storylines ===
In its series premiere, Laguna Beach first introduces Lauren Conrad, Lo Bosworth, Stephen Colletti, Morgan Olsen, Trey Phillips, and Christina Schuller, who were completing their senior year at Laguna Beach High School. Younger students Kristin Cavallari and Talan Torriero were shown to be finishing their junior year. The first season highlighted the love triangle involving rivals Conrad and Cavallari and their shared love interest, Colletti. The latter two eventually began a turbulent romantic relationship. Meanwhile, the close friendship between Bosworth and Conrad provided both with a stabilizing influence, similar to the bond between Olsen and Schuller. Phillips, an advocate for youth community involvement, coordinated a fashion show benefiting the Active Young America organization. Upon the seniors' graduation, they prepared to leave Laguna Beach and begin their college studies.

By the beginning of season two, Talan Torriero developed romantic feelings for both Cavallari and Cole, though both of them were uninterested in beginning a relationship with him. Meanwhile, Jason Wahler dated Smith, Murrel, and Conrad in separate periods during production, though his "player" tendencies placed a strain on each failed relationship. The season concluded as the recently graduated students prepared to leave for college.

During the third and final season, new students were introduced, such as Cameron Brinkman (who took over Jason's role as the "bad boy" that can get whatever he wants), Tessa Keller, Rocky Donatelli, Kyndra Mayo, Chase, Kelan Hurley and Cami Edwards, along with other additional cast members.

== Reception ==
=== Criticism ===
The Parents Television Council (PTC) argued that the sexually explicit and profane content in the series makes the show inappropriate for its intended audience. The PTC included the series in its 2004 study on profanity, violence, and sexual content on cable television. Although much of the profane language throughout the series is censored, the PTC pointed out that the context in which the censored words were used made them discernible, which in its view rendered the censorship useless. The PTC also criticized MTV for not including content indicators such as "L" (language) or "S" (sexual content) in addition to its television ratings for the show, a move that prevents parents from being able to effectively use the V-chip feature found on some televisions to control the broadcast of the show into their homes. MTV aired the show several times during daytime hours in addition to its regular timeslots around 10:00 PM (ET), and the PTC claimed that the adolescents whom MTV was targeting were being exposed to "excessive sexual and profane content through inaccurately rated programs."

A 2010 study published in the journal Economics Letters demonstrated that Laguna Beach: The Real Orange County caused an increase in crime in the Laguna Beach area. While Orange County Visitor and Convention Bureau president Charles Ahlers argued that the show had boosted the local economy and made Laguna Beach a desirable travel destination, several residents of Laguna Beach were opposed to the show, claiming it was more focused on teen drama and hedonistic behavior than the art and culture of the town. During filming days, traffic jams and tourists swarming local stores for a glimpse of the cast were frequent occasions.

=== Scripting allegations ===
Laguna Beach was often criticized for appearing to fabricate much of its storyline. In one instance, Cavallari claimed that producers exploited Colletti and Conrad's friendship to exaggerate the love triangle highlighted during the first season. She also alleged that she was treated poorly by producers, which "forced [her] to be a bitch", but stated that her distaste for Conrad was not fabricated.

== Episodes ==
Season	Episodes	Originally released	
Season	Episodes	First released	Last released
1	11	September 28, 2004	December 14, 2004
2	18	July 25, 2005	November 14, 2005
3	16	August 16, 2006	November 15, 2006

== Broadcast history ==
The first season of Laguna Beach: The Real Orange County premiered on September 28, 2004. The series continued to air on Tuesday evenings until its conclusion on December 14, 2004, at which point it had aired eleven episodes. The second season was expanded to seventeen episodes and premiered on July 25, 2005, in its new timeslot on Mondays. The finale aired on November 14, 2005. The third and final season premiered on August 16, 2006, and aired a total of fifteen episodes by its end on November 15, 2006. On July 2, 2007, Laguna Beach: The Real Orange County began rerunning on Noggin's teen block, The N. In July 2012, MTV aired a month-long morning marathon of Laguna Beach, titled "Retro Mania". The following year, the marathon was renamed "RetroMTV Brunch". In 2016, reruns aired on MTV's sister channel MTV Classic.

Laguna Beach: The Real Orange County entered off-network syndication in fall 2009, when Trifecta Entertainment & Media put the series into barter syndication and aired it on affiliates of Fox, MyNetworkTV, The CW and Independent stations. However, as of fall 2012, the show has left local syndication, along with Punk'd and The Hills.

=== Newport Harbor: The Real Orange County ===
After the third season of the revamped Laguna Beach failed to attain the success of the original format, producers began to search elsewhere for a potential fourth installment of the series. Newport Harbor: The Real Orange County premiered on August 13, 2007, and showcased a group of students attending Newport Harbor High School. The series was led by Chrissy Schwartz, Clay Adler, Chase Cornwell, Sasha Dunlap, Grant Newman, and Allie Stockton. However, the cast and the storylines failed to achieve viewer interest, the program was cancelled on January 2, 2008, after broadcasting twelve episodes.

== Distribution ==
Laguna Beach: The Real Orange County episodes aired regularly on MTV in the United States. Most episodes are approximately thirty minutes, and were broadcast in standard definition. The series' episodes are also available for download at the iTunes Store. Episodes were previously available for viewing through the official MTV website, though they have since become unavailable since the series' conclusion. The series, in addition to The Hills, were premiered in syndication in fall 2009. Since its debut, Paramount Pictures has released the first two seasons of Laguna Beach onto DVD, to regions 1, 2, and 4. Each product includes all episodes of the respective season, in addition to deleted scenes and interviews of series personnel.

== See also ==
- The Hills
- The City
- Baldwin Hills
- Audrina
- Newport Harbor: The Real Orange County
- Freshwater Blue
- Harlem Heights
- Living on the Edge
- The O.C.
- Very Cavallari
- The Hills: New Beginnings
