= List of The Hills cast members =

Original main cast members of The Hills

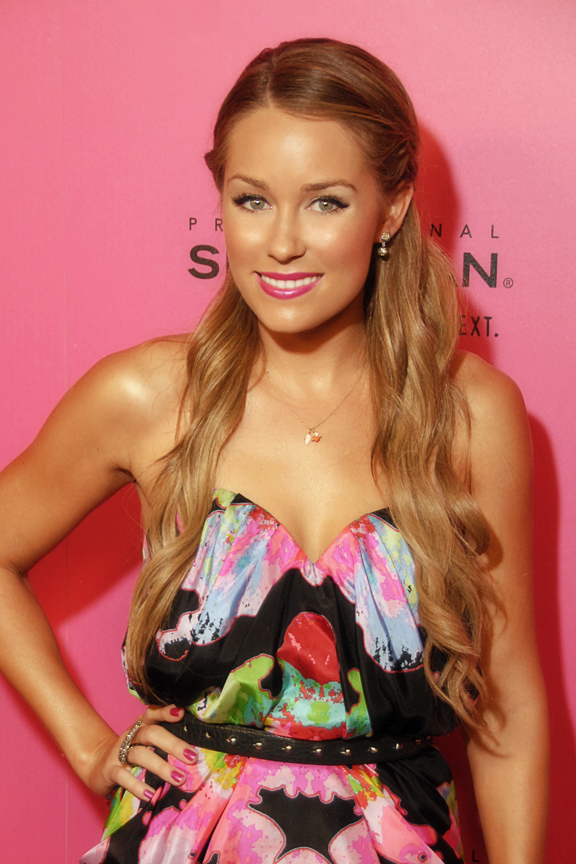
- Lauren Conrad
- (seasons 1–5)

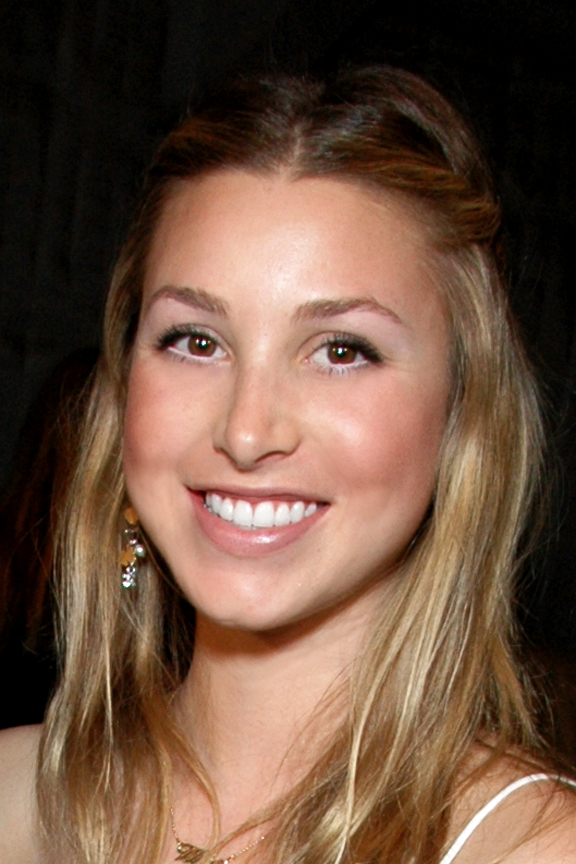
- Whitney Port
- (seasons 1–4)

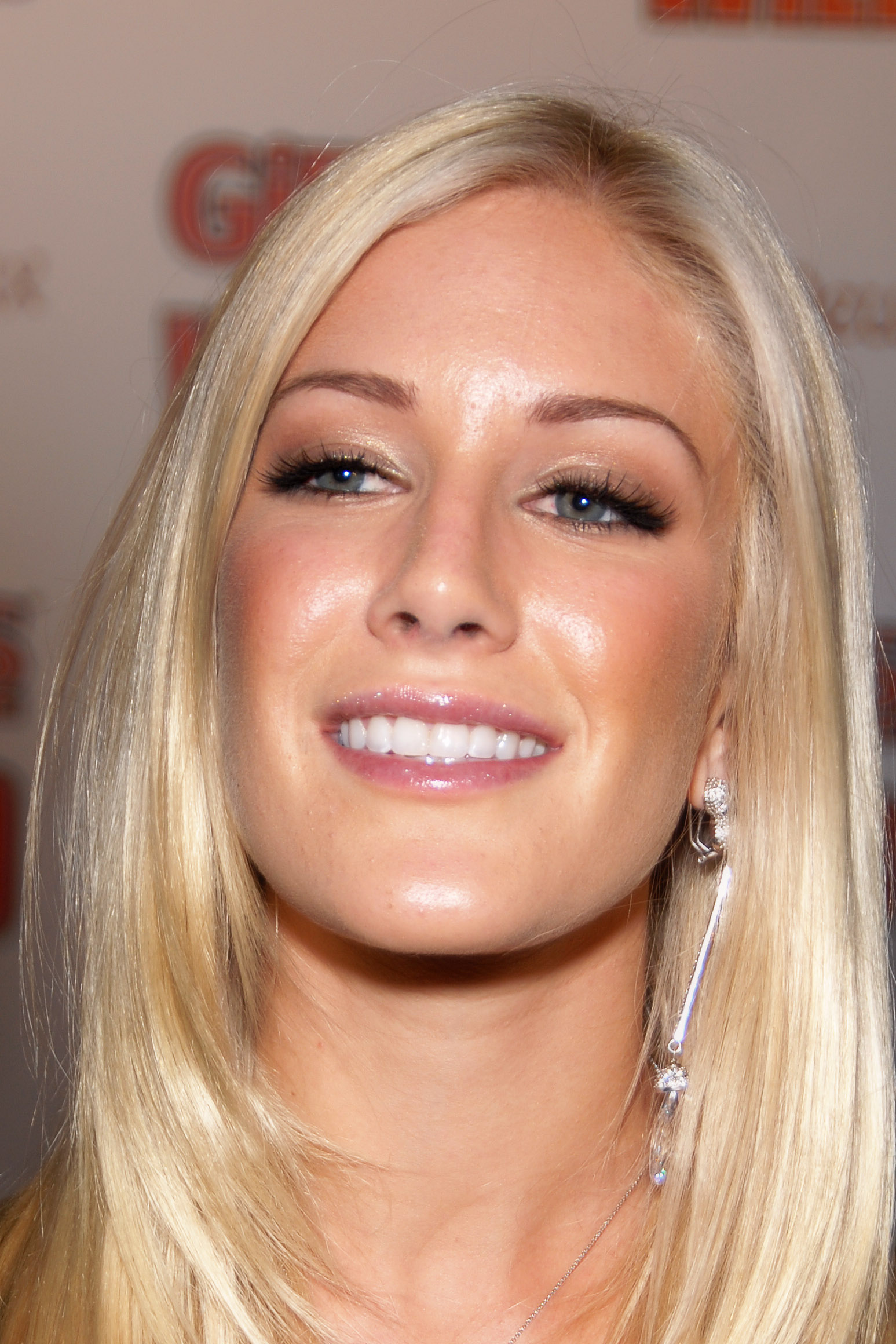
- Heidi Montag
- (seasons 1–6)

The Hills is an American reality television series that originally aired on MTV from May 31, 2006 until July 13, 2010. Developed as the spin-off of Laguna Beach: The Real Orange County, the series aired six seasons and focused on the personal and professional lives of several young women residing in Los Angeles, California. Its premise was originated with Adam DiVello, while Liz Gateley served as the executive producer.

Throughout its run, the series was generally led by four primary cast members (three in season 5), who were credited by their first names. Their storylines were largely developed by a number of supporting cast members. It originally focused on Lauren Conrad, who appeared in its predecessor, as she pursued a career in the fashion industry. It additionally placed emphasis on her housemate Heidi Montag and their friends Audrina Patridge and Whitney Port. Conrad's friend Lo Bosworth and Montag's boyfriend Spencer Pratt developed major positions as part of the supporting cast in the second season, while his sister Stephanie Pratt was added in the third. After moving to New York City, Port left the series upon the conclusion of the fourth season to launch her own spin-off The City.

Looking to pursue other career opportunities, Conrad left the series halfway through the fifth season, and was subsequently replaced by fellow Laguna Beach: The Real Orange County cast member Kristin Cavallari. Bosworth and the female Pratt joined Cavallari and Patridge as primary cast members in the sixth and final season, while Montag and her husband Pratt were removed from the show after four episodes.

== Main cast members ==
Main cast (appears in opening credits)
Supporting cast (3+ episodes)
Guest cast (1–2 episodes)

Cast member	Seasons						Ref(s)
Cast member	1	2	3	4	5	6	Ref(s)
Lauren Conrad	Main (Note: Conrad departs in "Something Old, Something New" (ep. 5.10).)	Main	Main	Main	Main	Guest (Note: Appears in alternate ending only.)	
Audrina Patridge	Main	Main	Main	Main	Main	Main	
Whitney Port	Main (Note: Port departs in "Mr. & Mrs. Pratt" (ep. 4.19), although she remains credited for the rest of the season.)	Main	Main	Main			
Heidi Montag	Main (Note: Montag departs in "This is Goodbye" (ep. 6.4), although she remains credited for the rest of the season.)	Main	Main	Main	Main	Main	
Kristin Cavallari					Main (Note: Cavallari appears as a guest star in "Something Old, Something New" (ep. 5.10), before being added to the opening credits from "It's On Bitch" (ep. 5.11).)	Main	
Lo Bosworth		Guest	Recurring (Note: Bosworth is initially credited onscreen as "Lauren's friend" (seasons 2–5), "Audrina's friend" (season 5), then just her first name, before being added to the opening credits from "Put on a Happy Face" (ep. 6.1).)	Recurring	Recurring	Main	
Stephanie Pratt			Recurring (Note: Pratt is credited onscreen as "Spencer's sister", before being added to the opening credits from "A New Bird" (ep. 6.5).)	Recurring	Recurring	Main	

Cast notes

== Supporting cast members ==
Supporting cast (3+ episodes)
Guest cast (1–2 episodes)

Cast member	Onscreen title	Seasons						Ref(s)
Cast member	Onscreen title	1	2	3	4	5	6	Ref(s)
Lisa Love	West Coast editor (Note: Also as "Lauren's Boss" and "West Coast editor, Teen Vogue" when outside the office.)	Recurring	Recurring	Recurring				
Jordan Eubanks	Heidi's boyfriend	Recurring						
Brian Drolet	Jordan's roommate	Recurring						
Brent Bolthouse	Nightlife & events producer	Recurring	Guest	Recurring	Recurring	Guest		
Jason Wahler	Lauren's ex-boyfriend (Note: Later as "Lauren's boyfriend" (season 1) and "Lauren's ex" (season 3).)	Recurring	Guest	Recurring				
Elodie Otto	Event coordinator (Note: Also as "Heidi's co-worker".)	Recurring	Recurring	Recurring				
Kelly Cutrone	Publicist for Jennifer Nicholson (Note: Later as "Owner, People's Revolution" (seasons 3–5).)	Guest		Recurring	Recurring	Recurring		
Spencer Pratt	Heidi's boyfriend (Note: Later as "Heidi's fiancé" (season 5) and "Heidi's husband" (seasons 3, 5–6).)		Recurring	Recurring	Recurring	Recurring	Recurring	
Jen Bunney	Lauren's friend (Note: Also as "Heidi's friend" (seasons 3, 5).)		Recurring	Recurring		Guest		
Chiara Kramer	Audrina's co-worker (Note: Also as "Epic intern".)		Recurring	Recurring	Recurring	Guest		
Brody Jenner	Spencer's friend (Note: Also as "Lauren's date" (season 2), "Lauren's friend" (seasons 3–5) and "Kristin's ex-boyfriend" (seasons 5–6).)		Recurring	Recurring	Recurring	Recurring	Recurring	
Emily Weiss	New York intern		Recurring					
Justin "Bobby" Brescia	Audrina's ex (Note: Also as "Audrina's boyfriend" (seasons 3–4) and "Audrina's ex-boyfriend" (seasons 5–6).)			Recurring	Recurring	Recurring	Recurring	
Frankie Delgado	Lauren's friend (Note: Also as "Brody's friend".)		Cameo	Recurring	Recurring	Recurring	Recurring	
Taylor "Sleazy T" Mosher	Brody's friend		Cameo	Guest		Recurring	Recurring	
Kimberly Brandon	Event coordinator (Note: Also as "Heidi's co-worker" (season 5).)			Recurring	Recurring	Guest		
Holly Montag	Heidi's sister		Cameo	Guest	Recurring	Recurring	Recurring	
Casey Patridge	Audrina's sister		Cameo	Guest	Recurring	Guest		
Doug Reinhardt	Lauren's friend (Note: Also as "Lauren's date".)				Recurring	Guest		
Charlie Smith	Spencer's friend (Note: Later as "Brody's friend" (season 6).)					Recurring	Recurring	
Stacie Hall	Bartender (Note: Also as "The bartender" (season 5) and "Kristin's friend" (seasons 5–6).)					Recurring	Recurring	
Jayde Nicole	Brody's girlfriend (Note: Also as "Brody's ex-girlfriend".)					Recurring		
Ryan Cabrera	Audrina's date (Note: Later as "Audrina's boyfriend".)						Recurring	
McKaela Line	Brody's date (Note: Later as "Brody's friend".)						Recurring	
Allie Lutz	McKaela's friend						Recurring	

Cast notes

== Cast crossovers ==
The Hills franchise includes its predecessor, Laguna Beach: The Real Orange County, and its spin-offs Newport Harbor, The City and The Hills: New Beginnings. Several cast members have appeared on multiple shows.

Main cast (receives star billing at some point in the series)
Supporting cast (3+ episodes)
Guest cast (1–2 episodes)

Cast member
Cast member	Laguna Beach (2004–06)	The Hills (2006–10)	The City (2008–10)	The Hills: New Beginnings (2019–21)
Stephen Colletti	Main	Guest		
Lauren Conrad	Main	Main	Guest	
Kristin Cavallari	Main	Main		Guest
Lo Bosworth	Main	Main		
Jason Wahler	Main	Recurring		Main
Jen Bunney	Recurring	Recurring		
Heidi Montag	Recurring	Main		Main
Audrina Patridge		Main		Main
Whitney Port		Main	Main	Main
Stephanie Pratt		Main		Main
Spencer Pratt		Recurring		Main
Brody Jenner		Recurring		Main
Justin "Bobby" Brescia		Recurring		Main
Frankie Delgado	Cameo	Recurring		Main
Kelly Cutrone		Recurring	Recurring	
Jay Lyon		Guest	Main	
Roxy Olin		Guest	Main	
