= The Hills season 3 =

The Hills
- Season 3
- DVD cover
- Starring: Lauren Conrad; Heidi Montag; Audrina Patridge; Whitney Port
- No. of episodes: 28

Release
- Original network: MTV
- Original release: August 13, 2007 – May 12, 2008

Season chronology
- ← Previous; Season 2 Next → Season 4

The third season of The Hills, an American reality television series, consists of 28 episodes and was broadcast on MTV. The first portion aired from August 13, 2007, until December 10, 2007, while the second portion aired from March 24, 2008, until May 12, 2008. The season was filmed from April 2007 to March 2008 in Los Angeles, California, with additional footage in Crested Butte, Colorado; Las Vegas, Nevada; and Paris, France. The executive producer was Liz Gateley.

The Hills focuses on the lives of Lauren Conrad, Audrina Patridge, Whitney Port, and Heidi Montag. During the season, Conrad ended her friendship with Montag after suspecting that she and her boyfriend Spencer Pratt fabricated rumors of a sex tape involving herself and ex-boyfriend Jason Wahler. The ensuing feud between the three became a central focus of the series, and was carried through each subsequent season. Meanwhile, Patridge resumed a relationship with her on-again/off-again boyfriend Justin Brescia.

== Synopsis ==
Lauren's and Hedi's feud reaches an all time high. At Teen Vogue, Whitney struggled with her new position as the Direct Supervisor to the interns after a break-up with a longtime boyfriend. and Lauren got a second chance with Lisa Love by being sent to Paris to assist with the Bal des Débutantes with Whitney by her side. After realizing that staying behind the scenes at Teen Vogue wasn't for her, Whitney got a new job working for the fashion PR firm, People's Revolution, and brought Lauren along with her. Lauren continued to stay close with her childhood friend, Lo Bosworth, and the two decided to buy a house together in Hollywood and invited Audrina to live with them, even though Lo felt uneasy about their decision. Additionally, Audrina spent more time with former flame, Justin, which made the situation in the house ever more uneasy. The two had a dramatic break-up but eventually reunited. Meanwhile, Heidi continued to climb the corporate ladder at Bolthouse Productions and struggled with her engagement to Spencer. The two went on a "relationship vacation", and Spencer consequently moved in with his sister, Stephanie, who managed to put herself in the midst of the 'Lauren vs Heidi' feud after befriending Lauren while taking a class at FIDM together. In the season finale, Heidi put her job at Bolthouse in jeopardy after going home with Spencer, who surprised her during a business trip to Las Vegas, and Audrina argued to Lauren that it was Lo who was pulling their friendship apart.

== Cast ==
Cast member	Notes
Main cast
Lauren Conrad	Attends FIDM pursuing Fashion Design, interns for Teen Vogue
Audrina Patridge	Lauren's best friend, works for Epic Records
Whitney Port	Lauren's close friend and co-worker at Teen Vogue
Heidi Montag	Lauren's former roommate, works for Bolthouse Productions
Supporting cast
Lo Bosworth	Lauren's best friend from Laguna Beach
Spencer Pratt	Heidi's boyfriend
Brody Jenner	Spencer's friend, Lauren's love interest
Justin Brescia	Audrina's on-again/off-again boyfriend
Frankie Delgado	Lauren and Brody's friend
Lisa Love	Senior editor for Teen Vogue, Lauren and Whitney's boss
Brent Bolthouse	Head event producer at Bolthouse Productions, Heidi's boss
Kelly Cutrone	Head of People's Revolution, Lauren and Whitney's boss
Elodie Otto	Heidi's former co-worker from Bolthouse Productions
Chiara Kramer	Audrina's friend at co-worker at Epic Records
Kimberly Brandon	Heidi's friend and co-worker at Bolthouse Productions

== Ratings ==
The season premiere averaged over 3.6 million viewers, up 44% from the season two premiere. The first half of season 3 made The Hills MTV's number one show and on cable among P12-34, reaching a total of 100 million viewers both online and on television. The second half, which premiered in March, was the highest rated cable telecast of the year among P12-34, with an average of 4.7 million viewers.

== Episodes ==
No. overall	No. in season	Title	Original release date	Prod. code
Part 1
23	1	"You Know What You Did"	August 13, 2007	301-30
Heidi and Spencer settle into their new apartment whilst Lauren and Audrina settle as roommates. Lauren suspects that Heidi and Spencer were responsible for rumors of her and Jason having a sex tape. The former roommates come to blows at Frankie's birthday party and their friendship is eventually over. Whitney gets a job at Teen Vogue.
24	2	"Big Girls Don't Cry"	August 14, 2007	302-30
Lauren heads to Laguna Beach to get advice from her mother over her recent situation. Audrina meets up with a former fling, Justin. Spencer proposes to Heidi. Note: Whitney does not appear in this episode.
25	3	"Truth and Time Tells All"	August 20, 2007	303-30
Lauren is not impressed after dinner with Justin Bobby. Spencer and Heidi come to disagreements about the apartment.
26	4	"Meet the Parents"	August 27, 2007	304-30
Heidi and Spencer travel to Colorado to meet Heidi's parents. Lauren, Lo and Audrina attend Brody's barbecue where Lauren tearfully reflects on her friendship with Heidi and Justin breaks Audrina's heart. Note: Whitney does not appear in this episode.
27	5	"Rolling with the Enemy"	September 3, 2007	305-30
Spencer severs ties with Brody after learning that he has gotten close to Lauren. Audrina gives Justin another chance, to Lauren and Lo's surprise.
28	6	"Second Chances"	September 10, 2007	306-30
With everything under control in Lauren's life, she gets a call from Jason who wants to catch up. Heidi gets a chance to move up at Bolthouse.
29	7	"They Meet Again"	September 17, 2007	307-30
Spencer, Heidi, Lauren and Jason come face to face over dinner at Ketchup. Elodie gives Heidi some home truths.
30	8	"For Better or Worse"	September 24, 2007	308-30
Jason reveals that he has a new girl and invites Lauren to meet her. To everyone's surprise, the two get engaged. Spencer reveals he hasn't told his parents about the wedding. Whitney is in charge of a Teen Vogue shoot. Guest stars: The Red Jumpsuit Apparatus
31	9	"What Happens in Vegas..."	October 1, 2007	309-30
It's Brody's birthday and the gang head to Las Vegas to celebrate. Lauren and Brody share a kiss and the girls get into an argument about Justin Bobby. Elodie gets revenge on Heidi by spoiling Heidi's anniversary plans with Spencer and nearly destroying her career at Bolthouse. Note: Whitney does not appear in this episode.
32	10	"What Goes Around..."	October 15, 2007	310-30
Jen Bunney makes a return and makes amends with Lauren. The sex tape drama resurfaces and the blame is put on Brody for allegedly starting it.
33	11	"No More Mr Nice Guy"	October 22, 2007	311-30
When Lauren goes on a date with a Teen Vogue model, it leads Brody to question the status of his and Lauren's relationship. Heidi and Spencer argue over her work commitments.
34	12	"Stress and the City"	October 29, 2007	312-30
Ahead of the Young Hollywood event, Whitney and Lauren head to New York where Lauren assists Marc Jacobs and Whitney presents her ideas at an official meeting. Spencer is eager to smooth things over with Brody. Note: Audrina does not appear in this episode.
35	13	"Young Hollywood"	November 5, 2007	313-30
It is the night of the Young Hollywood party- will it go without a hitch? Heidi and Spencer celebrate her birthday. Guest stars: Hilary Duff
36	14	"Forgive and Forget"	November 12, 2007	314-30
Lauren and Heidi have another confrontation at the Declare Yourself event, where Heidi makes it clear she believes the sex tape is real and tries to claim that she is innocent in the entire matter, and Lauren makes it clear Heidi is a liar and a bad person. Heidi then tries to apologize and make excuses for Spencer, but Lauren is not interested in Heidi's half-assed efforts to be nice, and tells her "I want to forgive you--and I want to forget you" before Heidi gets the hint and goes away. Audrina and Justin struggle in their 'relationship'. Guest stars: Sean Kingston
37	15	"With This Ring..."	November 19, 2007	315-30
Heidi and Spencer constantly fight about their wedding as Spencer just wants to elope. Whitney goes on a date with a trainer.
38	16	"A Night at the Opera"	November 26, 2007	316-30
It is a drama-filled night at Opera nightclub. Spencer's sister Stephanie comes to town and has a fiery confrontation with Lauren. Audrina catches Justin with another girl and it looks like the end, yet again. Note: Whitney does not appear in this episode.
39	17	"Once a Player"	December 3, 2007	317-30
Stephanie tells Spencer that Heidi might not be ready for a wedding. Audrina goes on a date with an Australian guy and brings him to Lauren's Halloween party. Lauren and Brody's relationship is still in question.
40	18	"When One Door Closes"	December 10, 2007	318-30
The first half of the season comes to a close as Lauren gets the chance to go with Whitney to Paris for the Crillon ball, which means putting a possible relationship with Brody on hold. Heidi leaves Spencer and the two go on a break.
Part 2
41	19	"Paris Changes Everything"	March 24, 2008	319-60
Lauren and Whitney work together in Paris for the Crillon Ball. Lauren gets news that Brody has found a girlfriend. Spencer follows Heidi to Colorado to win her back. Note: This episode is 60 minutes long. Audrina does not appear in this episode, but her voice is heard during a phone call with Lauren.
42	20	"Back to LA"	March 31, 2008	320-30
Lauren and Whitney return to LA. Whitney decides it's time to leave Teen Vogue. Heidi and Spencer go on a break and Spencer moves in with Stephanie.
43	21	"An Unexpected Friend"	March 31, 2008	321-30
Whitney has her first assignment with People's Revolution. Lauren learns that Stephanie is in her class at FIDM and they strike a friendship, to Audrina and Lo's surprise.
44	22	"When Spencer Finds Out..."	April 7, 2008	322-30
Stephanie comes to Lauren's birthday party, at a club where Heidi's co-worker is at the door. When Heidi and Spencer learn of this, Stephanie gets caught in the middle of Lauren and Heidi's feud.
45	23	"Just Be Careful"	April 8, 2008	323-30
Whitney continues to impress Kelly Cutrone at People's Revolution and gets help from Lauren. Heidi turns to Audrina, to Lauren's anger.
46	24	"Girls Night Out"	April 14, 2008	324-30
Heidi, Audrina and Stephanie go on a girls night out where Heidi and Spencer have a confrontation. Lauren is offered a job at People's Revolution.
47	25	"A New Roommate"	April 21, 2008	325-30
Lauren and Lo consider moving into a house together with Audrina. Heidi and Lauren have another encounter. Audrina seems ready to reunite with Justin.
48	26	"A Date with the Past"	April 28, 2008	326-30
It's the night of the housewarming party and Lauren's old friend, Stephen, is invited, causing her to reminisce about their past. Stephanie is torn between her loyalty to Heidi and her friendship with Lauren. Guest star: Stephen Colletti
49	27	"No Place Like Home"	May 5, 2008	327-30
Audrina begins to feel left out at home because of Lo and Lauren's friendship. Heidi is ready for the next step at work, which would mean leaving Spencer. Stephanie stands up to Spencer and kicks him out of her apartment. Note: Whitney does not appear in this episode.
50	28	"The Next Move Is Yours"	May 12, 2008	328-30
Tension continues to grow at Lauren's house and she confronts Audrina about it. Spencer chases Heidi to Las Vegas and puts her career at risk.
