= List of The Hills episodes =

The Hills is an American reality television series that originally aired on MTV from May 31, 2006, until July 13, 2010. Developed as the spin-off of Laguna Beach: The Real Orange County, the series aired six seasons and focused on the personal and professional lives of several young women residing in Los Angeles, California. Its premise was originated with Adam DiVello, while Liz Gateley served as the executive producer.

The Hills' first season commenced airing on May 31, 2006. The series continued to air on Wednesday evenings until its conclusion on August 2, 2006, at which point it had aired ten episodes. The second season was expanded to twelve episodes and premiered on January 15, 2007, in its new timeslot on Mondays. The finale aired on April 2, 2007. The third season began airing on August 13, 2007, where it remained in the timeslot of the previous season. Initially, the season was to air eighteen episodes, but was later expanded to a total of twenty-eight by its finale on May 12, 2008. The fourth season premiered on August 18, 2008, at which time it was moved back to its original Monday schedule. It consisted of twenty episodes, and concluded on December 22, 2008.

Airing of the fifth season was divided into two sections, Part I under the lead of original narrator Lauren Conrad, and Part II after Kristin Cavallari was confirmed as her replacement. Part I premiered on April 6, 2009, in the same timeslot, and concluded after ten episodes on May 31, 2009. Part II premiered on September 29, 2009, and continued to air on Tuesday evenings. The season aired a total of twenty episodes, each half spawning ten, before finishing on December 1, 2009. The sixth season also aired on Tuesdays and premiered on April 27, 2010. Twelve episodes later, the series ended its run after a total of 102 episodes on July 13, 2010. In July 2012, MTV aired a month-long morning marathon of The Hills, titled "Retro Mania". The following year, the marathon was renamed "RetroMTV Brunch", and culminated with the airing of an alternate series finale ending in August 2013.

== Series overview ==
| Season | Episodes | | Originally released | |
| Season | Episodes | | First released | Last released |
|---|---|---|---|---|
| 1 | 10 | | May 31, 2006 | August 2, 2006 |
| 2 | 12 | | January 15, 2007 | April 2, 2007 |
| 3 | 28 | 18 | August 13, 2007 | December 10, 2007 |
| 3 | 28 | 10 | March 24, 2008 | May 12, 2008 |
| 4 | 20 | | August 18, 2008 | December 22, 2008 |
| 5 | 20 | 10 | April 6, 2009 | May 31, 2009 |
| 5 | 20 | 10 | September 29, 2009 | December 1, 2009 |
| 6 | 12 | | April 27, 2010 | July 13, 2010 |

== Episodes ==
=== Season 1 (2006) ===
| No. overall | No. in season | Title | Original release date | Prod. code |
|---|---|---|---|---|
| 1 | 1 | "New City, New Drama" | May 31, 2006 | 101-30 |
| 2 | 2 | "A Change Of Plans" | June 7, 2006 | 102-30 |
| 3 | 3 | "An Unexpected Call" | June 14, 2006 | 103-30 |
| 4 | 4 | "Lauren And Jason, Take Two" | June 21, 2006 | 104-30 |
| 5 | 5 | "Jason's Birthday" | June 28, 2006 | 105-30 |
| 6 | 6 | "Boyfriends And Work Don't Mix" | July 5, 2006 | 106-30 |
| 7 | 7 | "Somebody Always Has To Cry" | July 12, 2006 | 107-30 |
| 8 | 8 | "You Can't Just Be With Me?" | July 19, 2006 | 108-30 |
| 9 | 9 | "Love Is Not A Maybe Thing" | July 26, 2006 | 109-30 |
| 10 | 10 | "Timing Is Everything" | August 2, 2006 | 110-30 |

=== Season 2 (2007) ===
| No. overall | No. in season | Title | Original release date | Prod. code |
|---|---|---|---|---|
| 11 | 1 | "Out With the Old..." | January 15, 2007 | 201-30 |
| 12 | 2 | "When You Least Expect It" | January 22, 2007 | 202-30 |
| 13 | 3 | "The Best Night Ever" | January 29, 2007 | 203-30 |
| 14 | 4 | "Who Do You Trust?" | February 5, 2007 | 204-30 |
| 15 | 5 | "One Big Interruption" | February 12, 2007 | 206-30 |
| 16 | 6 | "You Have Chosen" | February 19, 2007 | 206-30 |
| 17 | 7 | "With Friends Like These..." | February 26, 2007 | 207-30 |
| 18 | 8 | "Enough is Enough" | March 5, 2007 | 208-30 |
| 19 | 9 | "New Year, New Friends" | March 12, 2007 | 209-30 |
| 20 | 10 | "Apology Not Accepted" | March 19, 2007 | 210-30 |
| 21 | 11 | "Everyone Falls" | March 26, 2007 | 211-30 |
| 22 | 12 | "Goodbye For Now" | April 2, 2007 | 212-30 |

=== Season 3 (2007–08) ===
| No. overall | No. in season | Title | Original release date | Prod. code |
|---|---|---|---|---|
Part 1
| 23 | 1 | "You Know What You Did" | August 13, 2007 | 301-30 |
| 24 | 2 | "Big Girls Don't Cry" | August 14, 2007 | 302-30 |
| 25 | 3 | "Truth and Time Tells All" | August 20, 2007 | 303-30 |
| 26 | 4 | "Meet the Parents" | August 27, 2007 | 304-30 |
| 27 | 5 | "Rolling with the Enemy" | September 3, 2007 | 305-30 |
| 28 | 6 | "Second Chances" | September 10, 2007 | 306-30 |
| 29 | 7 | "They Meet Again" | September 17, 2007 | 307-30 |
| 30 | 8 | "For Better or Worse" | September 24, 2007 | 308-30 |
| 31 | 9 | "What Happens in Vegas..." | October 1, 2007 | 309-30 |
| 32 | 10 | "What Goes Around..." | October 15, 2007 | 310-30 |
| 33 | 11 | "No More Mr Nice Guy" | October 22, 2007 | 311-30 |
| 34 | 12 | "Stress and the City" | October 29, 2007 | 312-30 |
| 35 | 13 | "Young Hollywood" | November 5, 2007 | 313-30 |
| 36 | 14 | "Forgive and Forget" | November 12, 2007 | 314-30 |
| 37 | 15 | "With This Ring..." | November 19, 2007 | 315-30 |
| 38 | 16 | "A Night at the Opera" | November 26, 2007 | 316-30 |
| 39 | 17 | "Once a Player" | December 3, 2007 | 317-30 |
| 40 | 18 | "When One Door Closes" | December 10, 2007 | 318-30 |
Part 2
| 41 | 19 | "Paris Changes Everything" | March 24, 2008 | 319-60 |
| 42 | 20 | "Back to LA" | March 31, 2008 | 320-30 |
| 43 | 21 | "An Unexpected Friend" | March 31, 2008 | 321-30 |
| 44 | 22 | "When Spencer Finds Out..." | April 7, 2008 | 322-30 |
| 45 | 23 | "Just Be Careful" | April 8, 2008 | 323-30 |
| 46 | 24 | "Girls Night Out" | April 14, 2008 | 324-30 |
| 47 | 25 | "A New Roommate" | April 21, 2008 | 325-30 |
| 48 | 26 | "A Date with the Past" | April 28, 2008 | 326-30 |
| 49 | 27 | "No Place Like Home" | May 5, 2008 | 327-30 |
| 50 | 28 | "The Next Move Is Yours" | May 12, 2008 | 328-30 |

=== Season 4 (2008) ===
| No. overall | No. in season | Title | Original release date | Prod. code |
|---|---|---|---|---|
| 51 | 1 | "We'll Never Be Friends" | August 18, 2008 | 401-30 |
| 52 | 2 | "Drama Follows Them" | August 25, 2008 | 402-30 |
| 53 | 3 | "Better Off as Friends" | September 1, 2008 | 403-30 |
| 54 | 4 | "Boys Make Girls Cry" | September 7, 2008 | 404-30 |
| 55 | 5 | "Something Has to Change" | September 8, 2008 | 405-30 |
| 56 | 6 | "You Always Miss a Best Friend" | September 15, 2008 | 406-30 |
| 57 | 7 | "When Lauren's Away" | September 22, 2008 | 407-30 |
| 58 | 8 | "Don't Act Innocent" | September 29, 2008 | 408-30 |
| 59 | 9 | "If She Never Met Spencer" | October 6, 2008 | 409-30 |
| 60 | 10 | "Who to Choose?" | October 13, 2008 | 410-30 |
| 61 | 11 | "You'll Never Have This..." | October 20, 2008 | 411-30 |
| 62 | 12 | "I Want You to Be With Me" | October 27, 2008 | 412-30 |
| 63 | 13 | "It's Her Move" | November 3, 2008 | 413-30 |
| 64 | 14 | "Back to New York" | November 10, 2008 | 414-30 |
| 65 | 15 | "One Last Chance" | November 17, 2008 | 415-30 |
| 66 | 16 | "You Did This" | November 24, 2008 | 416-30 |
| 67 | 17 | "It's About Trust" | December 1, 2008 | 417-30 |
| 68 | 18 | "Dream Boy, Dream Job" | December 8, 2008 | 418-30 |
| 69 | 19 | "Mr. and Mrs. Pratt" | December 15, 2008 | 419-30 |
| 70 | 20 | "I Heidi Take Thee Spencer..." | December 22, 2008 | 420-45 |

=== Season 5 (2009) ===
| No. overall | No. in season | Title | Original release date | Prod. code |
|---|---|---|---|---|
Part 1
| 71 | 1 | "Don't Cry on Your Birthday" | April 6, 2009 | 501-30 |
| 72 | 2 | "Everything Happens for a Reason" | April 6, 2009 | 502-30 |
| 73 | 3 | "I'm Done with You" | April 13, 2009 | 503-30 |
| 74 | 4 | "Crazy in Love" | April 20, 2009 | 504-30 |
| 75 | 5 | "I Always Had a Little Crush" | April 27, 2009 | 505-30 |
| 76 | 6 | "Playmates Bring the Drama" | May 4, 2009 | 506-30 |
| 77 | 7 | "Keep Your Enemies Closer" | May 11, 2009 | 507-30 |
| 78 | 8 | "Father of the Bride" | May 18, 2009 | 508-30 |
| 79 | 9 | "Hi Lauren, It's Spencer" | May 25, 2009 | 509-30 |
| 80 | 10 | "Something Old, Something New" | May 31, 2009 | 510-60 |
Part 2
| 81 | 11 | "It's on Bitch!" | September 29, 2009 | 511-30 |
| 82 | 12 | "Mess with Me, I Mess with You" | October 6, 2009 | 512-30 |
| 83 | 13 | "Strike One" | October 13, 2009 | 513-30 |
| 84 | 14 | "Old Habits Die Hard" | October 20, 2009 | 514-30 |
| 85 | 15 | "Sorry Boo, Strike Two" | October 27, 2009 | 515-30 |
| 86 | 16 | "I'm Done with You (2)" | November 3, 2009 | 516-30 |
| 87 | 17 | "Onto the Next" | November 10, 2009 | 517-30 |
| 88 | 18 | "Can't Always Get What You Want" | November 17, 2009 | 518-30 |
| 89 | 19 | "Mr. Right Now" | November 24, 2009 | 519-30 |
| 90 | 20 | "The Boys of Summer" | December 1, 2009 | 520-30 |

=== Season 6 (2010) ===
| No. overall | No. in season | Title | Original release date | Prod. code | US viewers (millions) |
|---|---|---|---|---|---|
| 91 | 1 | "Put on a Happy Face" | April 27, 2010 | 601-30 | 2.738 |
| 92 | 2 | "Rumor Has It" | May 4, 2010 | 602-30 | 2.126 |
| 93 | 3 | "Elephant in the Room" | May 11, 2010 | 603-30 | 2.165 |
| 94 | 4 | "This Is Goodbye" | May 18, 2010 | 604-30 | 2.134 |
| 95 | 5 | "A New Bird" | May 25, 2010 | 605-30 | 1.998 |
| 96 | 6 | "Ghost from the Past" | June 1, 2010 | 606-30 | 1.962 |
| 97 | 7 | "The Company You Keep" | June 8, 2010 | 607-30 | 1.922 |
| 98 | 8 | "Between a Rocker and a Hard Place" | June 15, 2010 | 608-30 | N/A |
| 99 | 9 | "Break-up to Make-up" | June 22, 2010 | 609-30 | N/A |
| 100 | 10 | "Welcome to the Jungle" | June 29, 2010 | 610-30 | 1.803 |
| 101 | 11 | "Loves Me Not" | July 6, 2010 | 611-30 | 1.975 |
| 102 | 12 | "All Good Things..." | July 13, 2010 | 612-30 | 2.95 |
