= The Hills season 4 =

The Hills
- Season 4
- DVD cover
- Starring: Lauren Conrad; Heidi Montag; Audrina Patridge; Whitney Port
- No. of episodes: 20

Release
- Original network: MTV
- Original release: August 18 – December 22, 2008

Season chronology
- ← Previous; Season 3 Next → Season 5

The fourth season of The Hills, an American reality television series, consists of 20 episodes and was broadcast on MTV. It aired from August 18, 2008, until December 22, 2008. The season was filmed from April to December 2008 in Los Angeles, California, with additional footage in New York City, New York; Las Vegas, Nevada; Italy; and Cabo San Lucas, Mexico. The executive producer was Liz Gateley.

The Hills focuses on the lives of Lauren Conrad, Audrina Patridge, Whitney Port, and Heidi Montag. During the season, Conrad's distaste for Montag's boyfriend Spencer Pratt continues to inhibit reconciliation between the women. Meanwhile, Patridge is concerned that her new housemate Lo Bosworth is straining her relationship with Conrad. The season finale saw Port relocate to New York City to accept employment with Diane von Fürstenberg, while Montag and Pratt elope.

Upon the conclusion of the season, Port was commissioned her own spin-off series The City, which originally chronicled the lives of her and friends Olivia Palermo, Jay Lyon, Erin Lucas, and Adam Senn. Additionally, rumors were widespread that Conrad wished to leave the series to pursue other career opportunities, though she made her final appearance on the series during the mid-season finale of the following season.

== Synopsis ==
The fourth season continues as tension builds between housemates Lauren Conrad, Audrina Patridge, and Lo Bosworth. Patridge expresses concern that Bosworth is becoming a distancing factor between herself and Conrad. Before Patridge moves into a separate residence, the women tearfully mend their friendship. However, their friendship is briefly strained after Patridge hears false speculation that Conrad was involved with her on-again/off-again boyfriend Justin Brescia. Conrad became involved in a romantic relationship with her former boyfriend Doug Reinhardt, though the pair eventually separated and instead became friends.

As part of her duties with Kelly Cutrone's PR firm People's Revolution, Whitney Port finds herself often travelling to New York City and living a bi-coastal lifestyle. She eventually moves to the city after receiving employment with Diane von Fürstenberg, at which point she is commissioned her own spin-off series The City.

Meanwhile, to the dismay of her boyfriend Spencer Pratt, Heidi Montag allows her sister Holly to temporarily live with them after moving from their hometown of Crested Butte, Colorado. Pratt eventually convinces Heidi to ask Holly to find another residence. In celebration of her absence, he visits Montag at her work event with Bolthouse Productions, where she is terminated after becoming visibly intoxicated. However, Pratt later becomes enraged after Conrad and Bosworth welcome Holly to stay with them, as he and Montag were still feuding with the former regarding earlier sex tape rumors. Afterwards, Pratt surprises Montag with a vacation to Cabo San Lucas, where they decide to elope. Upon returning to Los Angeles, Conrad and Montag appear to come to common terms and become friends again out of spite of suspicions over Spencer. The season concludes as Pratt chooses not to legalize their marriage after deciding to gift Montag with her dream wedding.

== Cast ==
All four main cast members retain their positions during the fourth season of the series. Lauren Conrad serves as the series' narrator and focal point, and continues to attend the Fashion Institute of Design & Merchandising (FIDM). Along with her friend Whitney Port, she remains employed by Kelly Cutrone's PR firm People's Revolution. Audrina Patridge is housemates with Conrad, and works for Epic Records. Heidi Montag remains estranged with her former friends Conrad and Patridge, and is employed by event planning company Bolthouse Productions.

The aforementioned women's storylines were largely developed by a number of supporting cast members. Lo Bosworth is Conrad's best friend and third housemate, though Patridge sees her as a distancing factor in her friendship with Conrad. Justin Brescia, nicknamed "Justin Bobby" by Bosworth, returns as Patridge's on-again/off-again boyfriend. Brody Jenner, Frankie Delgado, and Doug Reinhardt are mutual friends with the majority of the cast. Having dated during their teenage years, Reinhardt also briefly dated Conrad in the beginning of the season.

Montag and her boyfriend Spencer Pratt are disliked by the majority of the cast, who look to disassociate themselves with the couple's antagonistic antics. However, Conrad is friends with their sisters Holly Montag and Stephanie Pratt, through whom Montag attempts to revive their friendship. In the workplace, Cutrone is featured as Conrad and Port's boss, while Brent Bolthouse serves as Montag's boss. Kimberly Brandon and Chiara Kramer are shown as Montag and Patridge's respective co-workers and friends.

== Episodes ==
No. overall	No. in season	Title	Original release date	Prod. code
51	1	"We'll Never Be Friends"	August 18, 2008	401-30
Lauren puts together a birthday party for Audrina, but Lo is very up-front about not being thrilled about the party planning or what Audrina's friends are like; Audrina later is blunt when she says Lo ignores or insults her and says they'll never become friends. Later, she goes out for dinner with her ex-boyfriend Doug, who expresses an interest in rekindling their relationship. Meanwhile, after her personal affairs ruined a business trip in Las Vegas, Heidi tries to redeem herself at Bolthouse Productions. Her sister Holly moves into town and stays with her and Spencer, much to his displeasure.
52	2	"Drama Follows Them"	August 25, 2008	402-30
Lauren attends Stephanie's birthday party and is shocked by Heidi and Spencer's surprise appearance. Afterwards, Spencer expresses his disapproval of her friendship with Lauren, and threatens to sever ties with her if their companionship continues. Audrina and Lo attempt a reconciliation, but find it difficult to begin their friendship. Meanwhile, Whitney begins living a bi-coastal lifestyle after receiving a significant promotion at People's Revolution.
53	3	"Better Off as Friends"	September 1, 2008	403-30
During a business trip in New York City, Whitney flirts with male model Alex. Stephanie finds herself in conflict with Spencer after their earlier discussion regarding her friendship with Lauren, while Brody cautions Lauren of his distrust in Stephanie. Lauren ends her relationship with Doug after failing to rekindle the feelings they shared during their adolescence, and suggests that a friendship would be more successful. Note: Audrina does not appear in this episode.
54	4	"Boys Make Girls Cry"	September 7, 2008	404-30
After Heidi tells Spencer that Holly will be living with them longer than originally expected, he threatens to leave their apartment. During a trip to Las Vegas, Lauren struggles to salvage her friendship with Audrina, while Brody tells Stephanie that she is dishonest and unwelcome in their social group. The following morning, Frankie informs the women that Brody and Doug got into a fight last evening and are currently in jail. Note: Whitney does not appear in this episode.
55	5	"Something Has to Change"	September 8, 2008	405-30
Brody and Doug clarify that they pressed charges against an attacker during a casino altercation. Upon arriving home, Lauren and Audrina agree to repair their struggling friendship during a teary conversation. During a work event, Lauren and Whitney dress a then up-and-coming Lady Gaga during a performance. Heidi notices that Holly has been avoiding her and is dismayed to learn that Spencer told Holly that she was unwelcome in their apartment.
56	6	"You Always Miss a Best Friend"	September 15, 2008	406-30
Audrina wants to bond with Lauren and Lo, and becomes increasingly irritated with Justin's apparent disinterest in their relationship. Heidi sees Holly's rekindled friendship with Lauren as an opportunity for the pair to reunite. However, Stephanie is concerned that Heidi will disown Holly, similar to her experience with Spencer after befriending Lauren.
57	7	"When Lauren's Away"	September 22, 2008	407-30
Lauren leaves for a family vacation in Italy. Stephanie goes on a dinner date with Doug, despite being cautioned by Audrina and Spencer that it may end her friendship with Lauren. Meanwhile, Audrina and Justin run into Heidi and Spencer in a nightclub, where the women renew their friendship. Upon returning home, Lauren is shocked after learning of the happenings in her absence. Note: Whitney does not appear in this episode.
58	8	"Don't Act Innocent"	September 29, 2008	408-30
Stephanie claims that she was being used by Doug to seek revenge against Lauren, though they continue to make plans together. Lauren brings Whitney to Doug's party, where she becomes increasingly irritated by Stephanie and Doug's relationship. After flying into town, Heidi's mother Darlene is disappointed to learn that she and Spencer had reunited. After she and Spencer fail to make peace during a lunch outing, Darlene tells Heidi that she seems increasingly less devoted to her family.
59	9	"If She Never Met Spencer"	October 6, 2008	409-30
Audrina is tired of Justin's commitment issues and goes out for dinner with another man. She later tells Justin that their relationship needs work, though he fails to take her seriously. Looking for a reunion, Heidi writes Lauren a letter asking for her forgiveness. Lauren feels bad that Heidi has lost most of her friends, but is displeased that Heidi tries to blame all of her problems on Spencer instead of taking responsibility for her own actions.
60	10	"Who to Choose?"	October 13, 2008	410-30
Audrina is torn between Justin and her former love interest Corey. While Lauren encourages her to try a new relationship, Audrina and Justin continue to see each other. Meanwhile, Spencer is concerned that Heidi did not tell him of her letter to Lauren, and threatens to move out of their apartment if Holly remains. Heidi later asks Holly to find another place to stay, to Holly's dismay.
61	11	"You'll Never Have This..."	October 20, 2008	411-30
The group celebrates Brody's birthday with a trip to Cabo San Lucas. Audrina worries that Justin will talk with other women during the vacation, and tries to make him jealous by flaunting her relationship with Corey. Heidi and Spencer invite Stephanie and her new boyfriend Cameron on a double date, though Spencer criticizes Cameron's friendship with Brody and tells him of Stephanie and Doug's dating. Note: Whitney does not appear in this episode.
62	12	"I Want You to Be With Me"	October 27, 2008	412-30
During an outing with Lauren and the group, Stephanie is displeased that Cameron refused to confront Brody. She begins to rethink their connection after he opts out of another lunch with Heidi and Spencer. Meanwhile, Audrina is surprised that Justin confesses his desire to salvage their relationship. Note: Whitney does not appear in this episode.
63	13	"It's Her Move"	November 3, 2008	413-30
Audrina prepares to move into another house, which she hopes will strengthen her bond with Justin. Before leaving the house, she and Lauren promise to maintain their friendship. Heidi is fired from her position at Bolthouse Productions after becoming drunk during a company event.
64	14	"Back to New York"	November 10, 2008	414-30
When traveling to New York City with Lauren for a business trip, Whitney quickly bonds with a singer named Jay. Spencer talks to an annoyed Brent in an attempt to salvage Heidi's employment with the company, though after his efforts fail, Heidi returns to the office to apologize for his behavior. Note: Audrina does not appear in this episode.
65	15	"One Last Chance"	November 17, 2008	415-30
Looking to prove his commitment, Justin invites Audrina on a vacation to Mexico to apologize for their earlier trip. Spencer is furious to learn that Holly is now living with Lauren and Lo, while Heidi blames him for getting fired from Bolthouse Productions and her damaged relationship with her sister.
66	16	"You Did This"	November 24, 2008	416-30
Lauren is enraged to learn that Audrina believes rumors that she and Justin hooked up with each other. Heidi is rehired in a lesser capacity than her previous position, and continues to struggle balancing her relationships with Holly and Spencer. A fight begins during a dinner meeting with Lauren, Lo, and Audrina, where Lauren angrily tells Audrina that Justin is "disgusting" and she would never hook up with him, Audrina tries to claim again that Lauren has "flirted" with Justin in the past and Audrina's mention of Lauren treating her like she did Heidi and Spencer leads to Lauren yelling at her "You're way worse than Heidi!" before leaving the restaurant in tears. Note: Whitney does not appear in this episode.
67	17	"It's About Trust"	December 1, 2008	417-30
Spencer pressures Stephanie into visiting their grandmother, who favors Spencer over Stephanie. Audrina recognizes that the rumors about Lauren and Justin were false and feels bad about ruining her friendship with Lauren, who wonders whether she should forgive Audrina or end their friendship altogether. Audrina apologizes to Lauren and explains that she has trust issues and that's why she believed bad information instead of taking Lauren at her word, and Lauren says she shouldn't trust Justin completely and everyone else not at all.
68	18	"Dream Boy, Dream Job"	December 8, 2008	418-30
Whitney interviews for a position with Diane von Fürstenberg in New York City, and reunites with Jay. Lauren is upset that her parents are moving out of their mansion in Laguna Beach, giving her no reason to visit her hometown. Stephanie is tired of Cameron's immaturity and breaks up with him.
69	19	"Mr. and Mrs. Pratt"	December 15, 2008	419-30
An intoxicated Heidi and Spencer elope during a surprise vacation to Mexico. Whitney accepts a job offer from Diane von Fürstenberg, and makes her final appearance on the series after sharing a tearful goodbye with Lauren before moving to New York City. Note: This episode marks Whitney's final appearance on the series, though she continues to receive star billing for the remainder of the season.
70	20	"I Heidi Take Thee Spencer..."	December 22, 2008	420-45
Heidi's family, friends, and co-workers disapprove of her elopement with Spencer. Her mother Darlene worries that Heidi would sacrifice her dream wedding by simply legalizing it in a courthouse. After running into each other at a work event, Lauren comforts a visibly upset Heidi and the pair appears to come to common terms. Stephanie eventually convinces Spencer to call of the plans and gift Heidi with a traditional church wedding. Meanwhile, Audrina and Justin travel to Palm Springs for vacation, where he gives her a commitment ring.
