= The Hills season 1 =

The Hills
- Season 1
- DVD cover
- Starring: Lauren Conrad; Heidi Montag; Audrina Patridge; Whitney Port
- No. of episodes: 10

Release
- Original network: MTV
- Original release: May 31 – August 2, 2006

Season chronology
- Next → Season 2

The first season of The Hills, an American reality television series, consists of 10 episodes and was broadcast on MTV. It aired from May 31, 2006, until August 2, 2006. The season was filmed from August 2005 to July 2006 in Los Angeles, California, with additional footage in New York City. The executive producer was Liz Gateley.

The Hills focuses on the lives of Lauren Conrad, Audrina Patridge, Whitney Port, and Heidi Montag. During the season, Conrad moves from Laguna Beach to Los Angeles. Accompanied by her best friend and housemate Montag, the pair attend the Fashion Institute of Design & Merchandising, though the latter left the college after receiving employment from Bolthouse Productions. Conrad befriends Port through an internship with Teen Vogue, while Montag develops a companionship with Patridge after learning that she lives in their apartment building.

== Synopsis ==
Lauren's road to independence was documented shortly after leaving Laguna Beach and moving to Los Angeles with her then best friend, Heidi Montag. The friends discovers that the LA lifestyle is not all it's cracked up to be, after learning the harsh reality of balancing social life, love, and careers, as old flames resurface, new friendships are formed, and secrets are exposed. All while, they are working toward the goals and ambitions they set for themselves in high school.

== Cast ==
Cast member	Notes
Main cast
Lauren Conrad	Attends FIDM pursuing Fashion Design, interns for Teen Vogue
Audrina Patridge	Lauren and Heidi's new friend, works for Quixote Studios
Whitney Port	Lauren's close friend and co-worker at Teen Vogue
Heidi Montag	Lauren's best friend and roommate, works for Bolthouse Productions
Supporting cast
Lisa Love	Senior editor for Teen Vogue, Lauren and Whitney's boss
Jordan Eubanks	Heidi's boyfriend
Brian Drolet	Jordan's roommate, Audrina's brief love interest
Brent Bolthouse	Head event producer at Bolthouse Productions, Heidi's boss
Jason Wahler	Lauren's boyfriend, previously appeared in Laguna Beach
Elodie Otto	Heidi's co-worker at Bolthouse Productions

== Episodes ==
No. overall	No. in season	Title	Original release date	Prod. code
1	1	"New City, New Drama"	May 31, 2006	101-30
19 year old Lauren has the opportunity of a lifetime: to move to L.A. with her best friend, Heidi, so they both can attend The Fashion Institute of Design & Merchandising. Lauren has an opportunity to interview for a killer internship at Teen Vogue. It all seems like a fashionista's dream when Lauren gets the internship, they are both admitted to FIDM and one of Lauren's first assignments is to work a high-profile celebrity party. The only problem is that Heidi's immaturity makes Lauren think this move may have been a big mistake.
2	2	"A Change Of Plans"	June 7, 2006	102-30
As Lauren begins to take school and her internship more seriously Heidi spends more time skipping class and when she gets an interview for her "dream job" she threatens to quit school for good if she gets hired.
3	3	"An Unexpected Call"	June 14, 2006	103-30
Both Lauren and Heidi continue to move forward with their new jobs even though, at times, they don't like what they are asked to do. When Lauren comes home after a short trip to New York, she gets an unexpected call from an old friend. Audrina looks for love. Note: Whitney does not appear in this episode.
4	4	"Lauren And Jason, Take Two"	June 21, 2006	104-30
Lauren decides to start spending time with Jason but she's keeping her guard up. And still very unhappy with her job, Heidi is on the verge of quitting. Note: Audrina does not appear in this episode.
5	5	"Jason's Birthday"	June 28, 2006	105-30
Lauren and Jason's relationship seems to be back in full swing but when Jason spends his entire birthday dinner ignoring her, Lauren thinks maybe she made a mistake taking him back.
6	6	"Boyfriends And Work Don't Mix"	July 5, 2006	106-30
Heidi's spot at Bolthouse comes into conflict with her anniversary plans and Whitney lands on the runway for Teen Vogue.
7	7	"Somebody Always Has To Cry"	July 12, 2006	107-30
Lauren's New Year's Eve plans go down the tubes when Jason gets jealous of a boy from her past. Note: Audrina and Whitney do not appear in this episode.
8	8	"You Can't Just Be With Me?"	July 19, 2006	108-30
Lauren and Whitney scope out male models for Teen Vogue and Jason plans a birthday surprise for Lauren.
9	9	"Love Is Not A Maybe Thing"	July 26, 2006	109-30
Sick of the fighting, Heidi decides to end her relationship with Jordan.
10	10	"Timing Is Everything"	August 2, 2006	110-30
When Lauren gets offered an internship in Paris, her summer plans with Jason are called into question. Audrina and Heidi decide to spend the summer partying.
