= The Hills season 2 =

The Hills
- Season 2
- DVD cover
- Starring: Lauren Conrad; Heidi Montag; Audrina Patridge; Whitney Port
- No. of episodes: 12

Release
- Original network: MTV
- Original release: January 15 – April 2, 2007

Season chronology
- ← Previous; Season 1 Next → Season 3

The second season of The Hills was broadcast between January 15 and April 2, 2007. The season continues to follow the lives of Lauren Conrad, Heidi Montag, Audrina Patridge and Whitney Port in Los Angeles as they face new challenges at work and school, with romances threatening to damage their friendships. The season was filmed from August 2006 through March 2007.

== Synopsis ==
Lauren makes a decision on her relationship with Jason, and begins to focus all of her energy at work where she found herself "teamed up" with Whitney against the New York intern, Emily Weiss, who occasionally visits the Los Angeles offices. Whitney gets a job opportunity of lifetime. Meanwhile, After being spotted with Spencer Pratt, Heidi soon learned that Spencer was being unfaithful and declared their relationship to be over. Despite this, the two eventually got back together and Lauren subsequently turned to Audrina for friendship.

== Cast ==
Cast member	Notes
Main cast
Lauren Conrad	Attends FIDM pursuing fashion design, interns for Teen Vogue
Audrina Patridge	Lauren's best friend, works for Epic Records
Whitney Port	Lauren's close friend and co-worker at Teen Vogue
Heidi Montag	Lauren's roommate, works for Bolthouse Productions
Supporting cast
Brent Bolthouse	Head event producer at Bolthouse Productions, Heidi's boss
Lisa Love	Senior editor for Teen Vogue, Lauren and Whitney's boss
Spencer Pratt	Heidi's boyfriend
Jen Bunney	Lauren and Heidi's friend, previously appeared in Laguna Beach
Elodie Otto	Heidi's friend and co-worker at Bolthouse Productions
Chiara Kramer	Audrina's friend and co-worker at Epic Records
Brody Jenner	Spencer's friend, Lauren's love interest
Emily Weiss	Teen Vogue intern from New York, jokingly known as "Super Intern"
Lo Bosworth	Lauren's best friend, previously appeared in Laguna Beach

== Episodes ==
No. overall	No. in season	Title	Original release date	Prod. code
11	1	"Out With the Old..."	January 15, 2007	201-30
The summer is over and Lauren and Jason have broken up. Lauren decides to focus her attention on getting back into Lisa Love's good graces at Teen Vogue. Heidi and Audrina's friendship suffers from the arrival of Spencer Pratt, Heidi's new boyfriend, who seems to be a player.
12	2	"When You Least Expect It"	January 22, 2007	202-30
Lauren and Whitney cover a major fashion show and Heidi learns the result of her pregnancy test. Audrina rejects Spencer when he asks her out on a date. Lauren goes on her first date with Brody.
13	3	"The Best Night Ever"	January 29, 2007	203-30
It is Heidi's birthday and at her party, Audrina shows up to try to make amends, only to be rejected.
14	4	"Who Do You Trust?"	February 5, 2007	204-30
Heidi and Audrina finally put aside their differences about Spencer over dinner. Spencer comes to blows with Heidi's co-worker Max over her work attire. Their romance is put to the test, however, when Heidi unexpectedly catches Spencer at a club with some Playmates and it seems like their relationship is over.
15	5	"One Big Interruption"	February 12, 2007	206-30
Heidi confronts Spencer on his flirting behaviour but after warnings from her girlfriends that he cannot be trusted, Heidi gives him another chance. Lauren and Whitney are threatened by the arrival of super intern Emily at Teen Vogue.
16	6	"You Have Chosen"	February 19, 2007	206-30
Heidi and Lauren have a major argument about Spencer as Lauren feels like she is losing Heidi as a friend.
17	7	"With Friends Like These..."	February 26, 2007	207-30
It is Jen's 21st birthday and heartbreak is headed for The Hills. Spencer and Heidi set Jen up with Brody, further driving a wedge into Heidi and Lauren's friendship. It is clear that Lauren needs to evaluate her friendships.
18	8	"Enough is Enough"	March 5, 2007	208-30
Heidi tries to spend more time with Lauren and save their friendship but she leave her at the last minute, choosing to go away with Spencer. As a result, Lauren turns to Audrina. Whitney tries to move up the ranks at Teen Vogue but it is not easy.
19	9	"New Year, New Friends"	March 12, 2007	209-30
It is a new year in the Hills and Lauren wants to celebrate it with her best friends, including Lo from Laguna. Spencer asks Heidi to move in with him. Heidi begins to feel left out after Lauren spends most of the night with Audrina and it is Lo who breaks the news to Lauren about Spencer's ideas.
20	10	"Apology Not Accepted"	March 19, 2007	210-30
Heidi throws a surprise birthday party for Lauren. Jen tries to apologize to Lauren for everything but Lauren rejects her.
21	11	"Everyone Falls"	March 26, 2007	211-30
Whitney gets the chance of a lifetime at Teen Vogue, modeling for a Good Morning America shoot in time for the Oscars. However, she trips and worries that she has let Lisa down but she gets a stamp of approval from Amy Astley and even Anna Wintour. Heidi says no to Spencer's offer.
22	12	"Goodbye For Now"	April 2, 2007	212-30
Whitney heads to New York for a Teen Vogue job interview, competing with others. Heidi agrees to move in with Spencer, which could spell the end for her and Lauren's friendship. Audrina becomes Lauren's roommate.
