= New City, New Drama =

- The Hills episode
- Episode no.: Season 1 Episode 1
- Narrated by: Lauren Conrad
- Production code: 101-30
- Original air date: May 31, 2006
- Running time: 21 minutes (without commercials)

Episode chronology
← Previous —	Next → "A Change of Plans"
- The Hills (season 1)

"New City, New Drama" is the pilot episode of The Hills, the first spin-off of Laguna Beach: The Real Orange County. It originally aired on MTV on May 31, 2006. In the episode, Lauren Conrad and Heidi Montag move into an apartment in Los Angeles. Conrad befriends fellow Teen Vogue intern Whitney Port, while Montag bonds with their neighbor Audrina Patridge. Conrad is later scolded after Montag and her companions arrive uninvited to a corporate event.

"New City, New Drama" was produced by Tony DiSanto, Adam DiVello, Liz Gateley, Colin Nash, and Andrew Perry. The episode received generally favorable reviews from critics, who appreciated its plotline and production. According to Nielsen ratings, it was watched by 2.9 million viewers. The episode was released on DVD on February 13, 2007, packaged with the remainder of the first season.

== Plot ==
Lauren and her housemate Heidi move into their shared apartment in Los Angeles. Shortly after arriving, Lauren's interview for an internship with Teen Vogue is unexpectedly changed to an earlier time. While Lauren meets with the magazine's West Coast editor Lisa Love, Heidi befriends their neighbor Audrina. That evening, the women, Heidi's boyfriend Jordan Eubanks, and his roommate Brian Drolet eat dinner at the sushi restaurant Geisha House.

The following morning, Lauren and Heidi meet with the administrators at the Fashion Institute of Design & Merchandising. While Lauren impresses her superiors, they question if Heidi is prepared for college. Upon returning home, Blaine Zuckerman calls Lauren on behalf of Teen Vogue and offers her an internship with the magazine. On her first day, she befriends another intern Whitney, and the two begin preparing for the launch party of Teen Vogue's "Hollywood" edition.

As Lauren and Whitney learn that they will be working during the party, Heidi wants to attend the event, which Lauren is unwilling to risk her internship for. Nonetheless, as Heidi, Audrina, Jordan, and Brian arrive unexpectedly that evening, Lauren and Whitney allow the group in. Blaine and Lisa scold Lauren for an argument between Heidi and Jordan, in addition to allowing the group to sit in a reserved seating area. Lisa tells her that they will "discuss this on Monday".

== Production ==
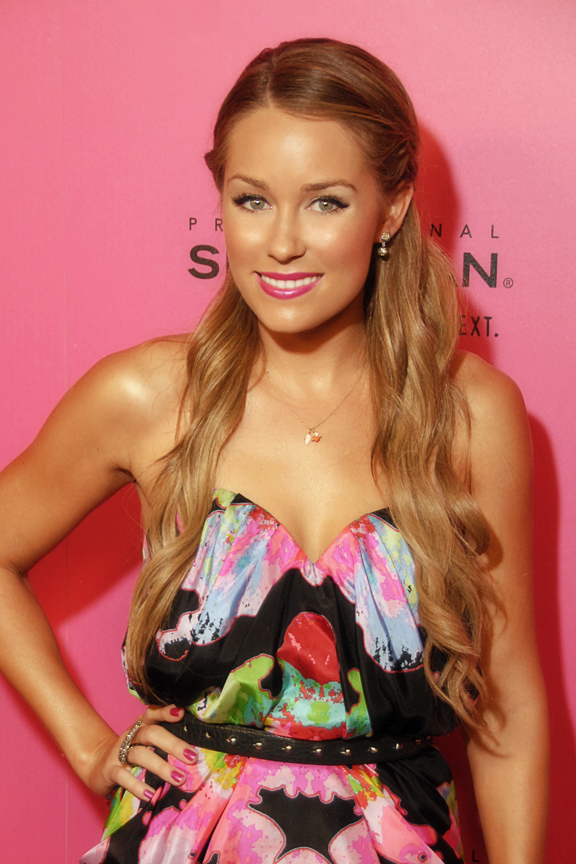
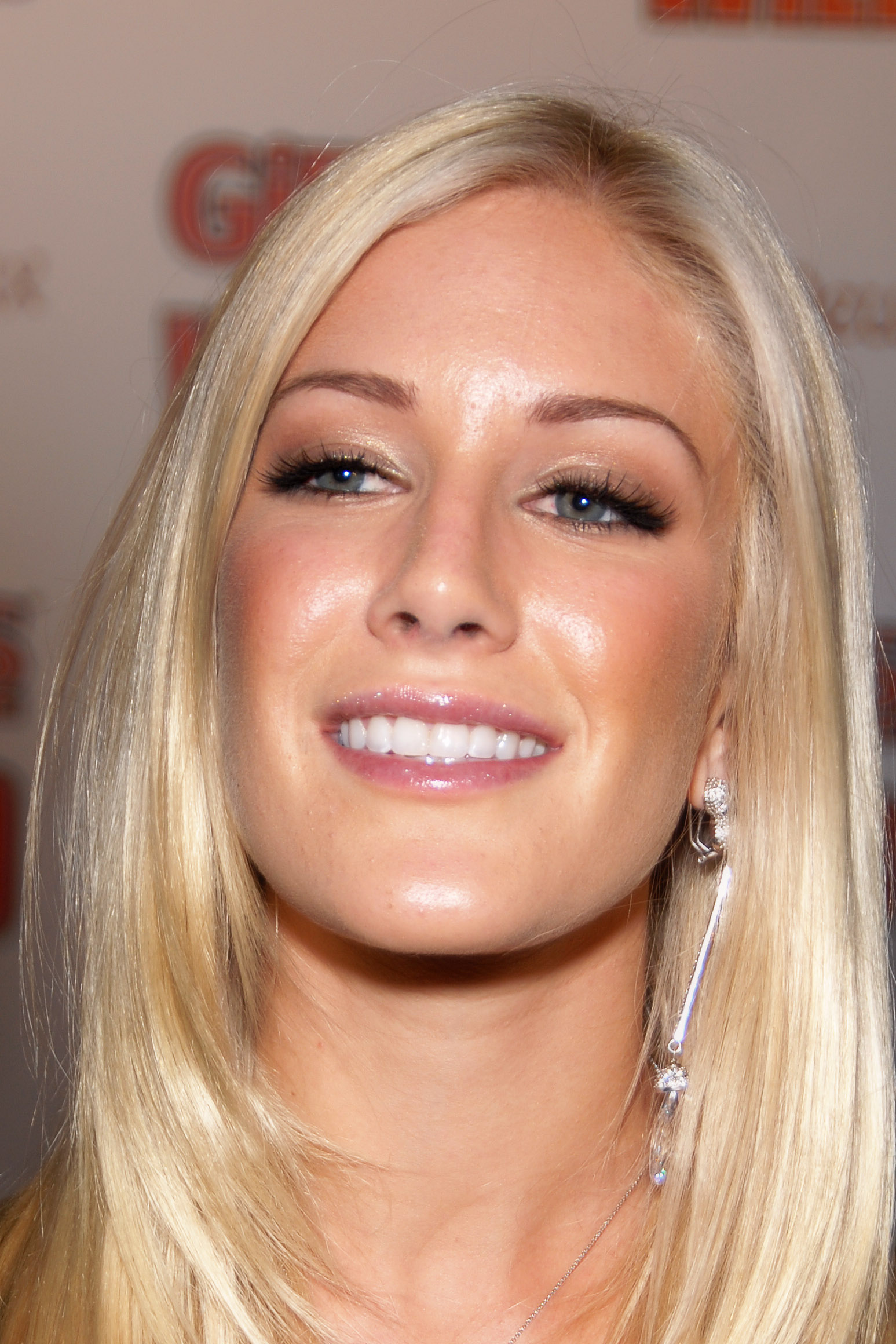
Lauren Conrad (left) and Heidi Montag (right) were the first women introduced on "New City, New Drama"

After the first two seasons of Laguna Beach: The Real Orange County enjoyed continued ratings success, MTV approved production of the spin-off series The Hills in 2005. Like its predecessor, the reality television program was filmed in a narrative format more commonly seen in soap operas. Conrad, who served as the parent series' first season narrator, became the focal point of the show as she moved to Los Angeles to pursue a career in the fashion industry.

The pilot episode introduced three additional primary cast members. Montag, who was previously featured on Laguna Beach in a limited capacity, became Conrad's housemate by the time production had begun on the first season of The Hills. On the series, it was depicted as if Montag had befriended Patridge by her own doing, though Patridge claimed that a producer offered her a position on the series to become friends with Conrad and Montag. Port was introduced to the series as Conrad's co-intern at Teen Vogue.

"New City, New Drama" was produced by Tony DiSanto, Adam DiVello, Liz Gateley, Colin Nash, and Andrew Perry. The latter four individuals had previously served as producers for Laguna Beach. DiVello and Gateley served as the series' executive producers until its conclusion in July 2010.

== Reception and release ==
"New City, New Drama" was met with generally favorable reviews from critics, who appreciated its plotline and production. Kelly West from Television Blend noted that The Hills commented that MTV "[keeps] things simple", noting the similarities it shares with Laguna Beach, but given the network's success with reality programming since the 1990s, opined that the series was "sure to be as much of a hit" as its predecessor. Writing for The New York Times, Virginia Heffernan enjoyed watching "charmed" work experiences and the "hammy deadbeat" Montag, further stating that she saw the program as being more fictional than reality. Kara Medalis of the Pittsburgh Post-Gazette said that she missed Kristin Cavallari from Laguna Beach, but enjoyed Montag as "the new troublemaker in [Conrad's] life".

In its original broadcast in the United States on May 31, 2006, "New City, New Drama" was watched by 2.9 million viewers. The remainder of the season maintained a steady viewership of about two million viewers for each weekly episode, and was subsequently picked up for a second season. In the country, the first season was released as a two-disc DVD set on February 13, 2007.
