= You Know What You Did =

- The Hills episode
- Lauren (left) and Audrina (center) sever ties with Heidi (right) over the sex tape rumors.
- Episode no.: Season 3 Episode 1
- Narrated by: Lauren Conrad
- Production code: 301-30
- Original air date: August 13, 2007
- Running time: 21 minutes (without commercials)

Episode chronology
| ← Previous "Goodbye For Now" | Next → "Big Girls Don't Cry" |
- The Hills (season 3)

"You Know What You Did" is the first episode of the third season of The Hills. It originally aired on MTV on August 13, 2007. In the episode, Lauren Conrad ends her friendship with former housemate Heidi Montag after suspecting that Heidi and her boyfriend Spencer Pratt fabricated rumors of a sex tape involving Lauren and her ex-boyfriend Jason Wahler. The ensuing feud between the women becomes a central focus of the series, and is carried through each subsequent season in which Conrad appears.

"You Know What You Did" was produced by Tony DiSanto, Adam DiVello, Liz Gateley, Sara Mast, Andrew Perry, Jason Sands, Robyn Schnieders, Sean Travis, Michael "Spike" Van Briesen, and Rick Van Meter. The episode was met with generally favorable reviews from critics, who felt that the changed dynamic between Conrad and Montag was entertaining for television. It was additionally notable for Conrad's delivery of the titular line "You know what you did!" when speaking to Montag, which has since been recognized as an iconic moment from the series.

According to Nielsen ratings, "You Know What You Did" was watched by 3.6 million viewers in its original airing. The episode was released on DVD on July 19, 2008, packaged with the third season set.

== Plot ==
The third season of The Hills begins with Whitney Port becoming Lauren's boss, after being promoted within Teen Vogue. On their first day returning to work, Lauren informs Whitney of false speculation regarding a sex tape involving herself and her ex-boyfriend Jason Wahler. Lauren comments that she has not spoken with Heidi since she moved into an apartment with Spencer, and the women become suspicious of her possible involvement with the rumors. Meanwhile, Heidi and Spencer are planning their housewarming party; Spencer plans on inviting several of his friends, while Heidi was only planning on inviting Lauren, Whitney, and Audrina Patridge. Visiting Audrina at Epic Records unannounced, she delivers invitations for Audrina and Lauren. Audrina accepts the invitations, although later tells her co-worker that she believes that Heidi and Spencer were speaking badly of Lauren and were responsible for spreading the sex tape rumors.

Lauren and Whitney decline their invitations to the housewarming party, and instead plan an impromptu outing at the club Les Deux. Meanwhile, during the housewarming party, Jenn Bunney makes a brief appearance at the apartment, although Heidi is disappointed after realizing that Lauren will not be attending. Unaware that they will run into Heidi and Spencer, Lauren and Audrina attend a birthday party for their friend Frankie Delgado the following day. As Lauren leaves for the bathroom after Heidi gives her a letter, Heidi tells Audrina that she is unsure of the reason for the tension between them. Audrina finds Lauren in the bathroom and they read the letter together, which details Heidi's interest in rekindling their friendship. Angered that Heidi will not acknowledge the sex tape rumors, Lauren decides to exit the club.

At the recommendation of Spencer, Heidi confronts Lauren before she is able to leave the club. Lauren and Audrina get into an argument with Heidi and Spencer outside of Les Deux, where Lauren delivers the now-famous quote "You know what you did!", elaborating that "You started a sick little rumor about me! You're a sad, pathetic person." The following morning, Heidi explains to her co-worker Elodie Otto that she was unaware of said speculation, and still wants to reconcile with Lauren. Meanwhile, Lauren tells Whitney that she is saddened by the idea of losing her friend, although admits that she has benefited from their separation.

== Production ==
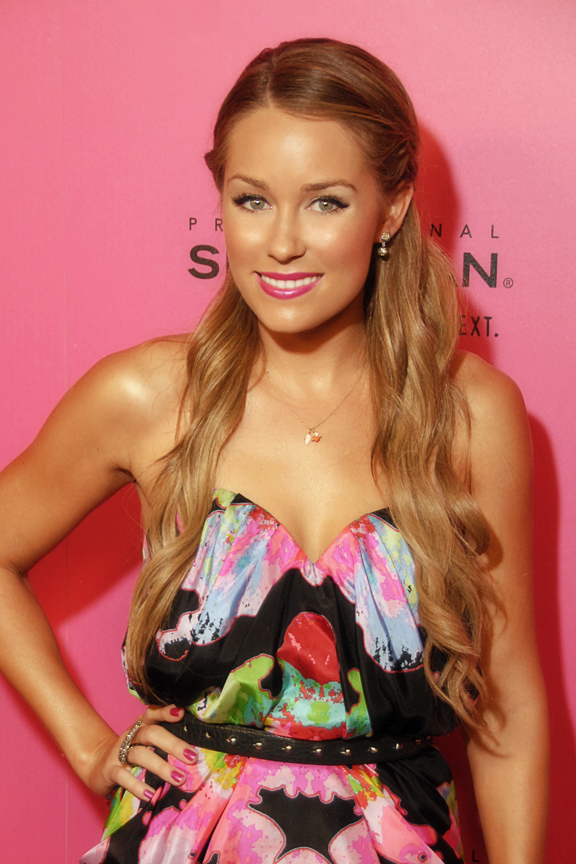
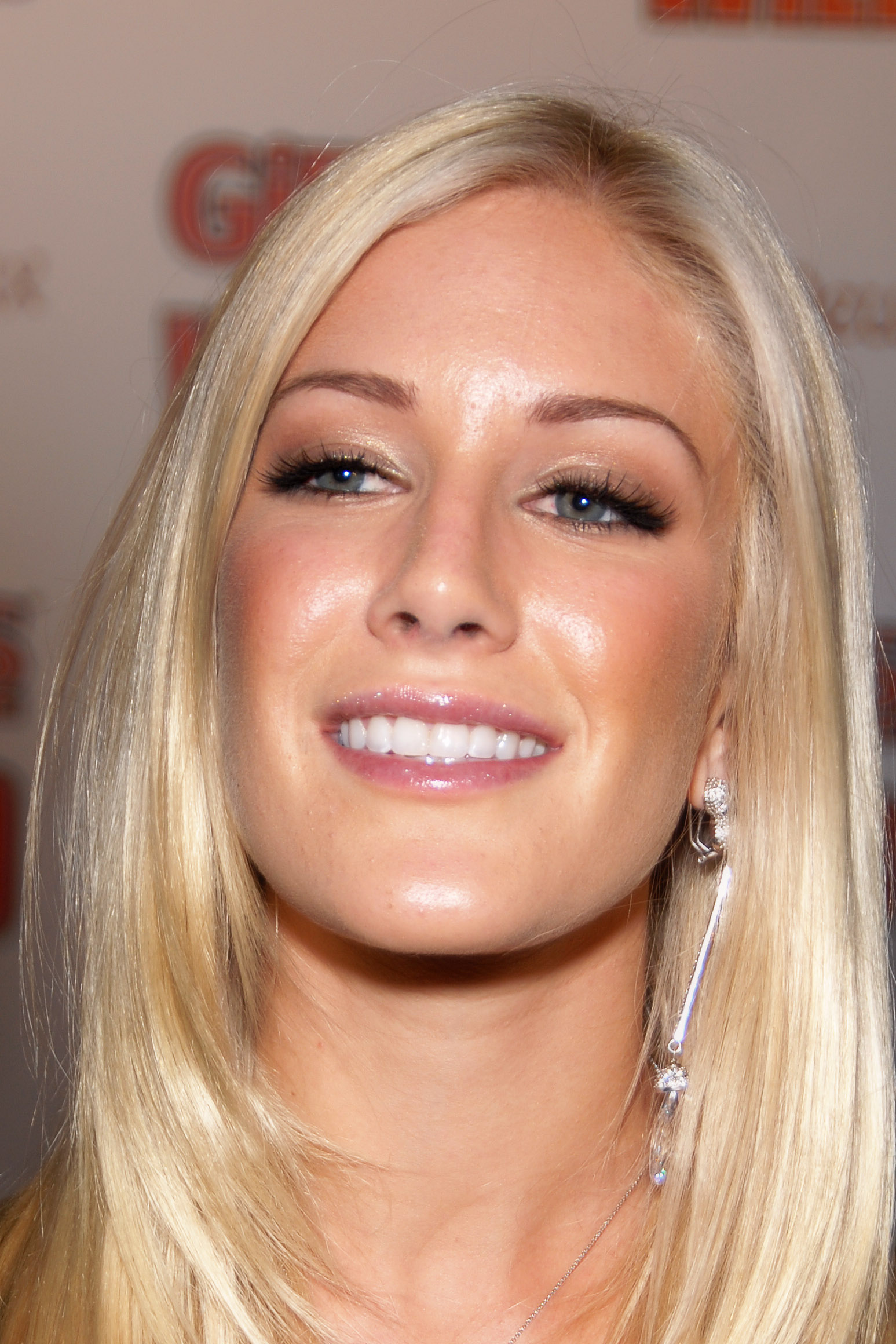
"You Know What You Did" marked the beginning of a feud between Conrad (left) and Montag (right) that was carried through each subsequent season in which Conrad appears

"You Know What You Did" was produced by Tony DiSanto, Adam DiVello, Liz Gateley, Sara Mast, Andrew Perry, Jason Sands, Robyn Schnieders, Sean Travis, Michael "Spike" Van Briesen, and Rick Van Meter. Rumors of a sex tape involving Conrad and Wahler, in addition to stories alleging that she invaded his house to retrieve it, surfaced in April 2007. Conrad adamantly denied both reports, commenting that "if I ever tried to get something back from Jason, it was probably just photo albums and stuff" and the producers "videotape my life five days out of the week. I don't need additional footage, you know?"

The president of entertainment for MTV, Brian Graden, commented that the series benefits from the media coverage it receives in between seasons, which he described as a "six-month commercial for the show that doesn't give away the narrative in full." He elaborated that MTV wants "viewers to watch Lauren and the girls as the characters we know instead of in a show about being the stars of The Hills"; the sex tape rumors were consequently presented like a personal conflict between the women, and was intentionally not addressed as a highly publicized controversy.

The ensuing feud between Conrad and Montag received extensive media attention since its beginning; Conrad was doubtful of the possibility of a reconciliation, noting that "I can see us getting to not hating each other but I don't think we would ever go back to being best friends." When addressing speculation that the conflict was fabricated for television, Conrad stated that "I wouldn't fight for the camera. If anything I would try not to." In a separate interview, she revealed that she almost quit the program before the season began, stating "it wasn't so much about the filming, but I didn't want to do a show with the other people on it", which was assumed to be alluding to Montag and Pratt.

== Release and reception ==
"You Know What You Did" was met with generally favorable reviews from critics, who felt that the changed dynamic between Conrad and Montag was entertaining for television. Writing for Entertainment Weekly, Jennifer Armstrong provided a favorable review; she opined that the conflict between Conrad and Montag made for the "most mature season ever" and offered a disclaimer that the term "maturity" was "being relative here, of course." A writer for The Hollywood Gossip stated that the episode "didn't disappoint", and felt that the storyline clearly categorized Patridge and Port as being part of "Team Lauren" and Pratt as being part of "Team Heidi" in the "epic war".

Virginia Heffernan from The New York Times felt that the deterioration of Conrad and Montag's friendship was "more convincing than Friends and just about any other comedy about female relationships because — as anyone who has ever been a young woman knows — undying friendships die." Writing for Los Angeles Times, Denise Martin was complimentary of the fact that the conflict was "unsullied" despite the extensive media coverage it received before the season began, and added that it was "better than anything you'd get on All My Children." Furthermore, Conrad's delivery of the titular line "You know what you did!" when speaking to Montag has been recognized as an iconic moment from the series; the staff from Us Weekly ranked the scene as the most memorable event from the program when recapping highlights from its six seasons in July 2010.

In its original broadcast in the United States on August 13, 2007, "You Know What You Did" was watched by 3.6 million viewers. Consequently, it became the series' most-viewed episode at the time of its first airing; as August 2007, the episode was the network's highest-rated broadcast that year. It was surpassed by "Paris Changes Everything", which served as the premiere for the second half of the season, on March 17, 2008; it attracted 4.8 million viewers in its original airing. In the United States, the third season was released as a four-disc DVD set on July 19, 2008.
