= Twentyfourseven =

American television series

- Genre: Reality
- Created by: Greg Carney; Kevin Tancharoen
- Country of origin: United States
- Original language: English
- No. of seasons: 1
- No. of episodes: 8

Production
- Executive producers: Jesse Ignjatovic; Ken Mok; Kevin Tancharoen; Rod Aissa
- Production company: 10 by 10 Entertainment

Original release
- Network: MTV
- Release: December 6, 2006 – February 21, 2007

Twentyfourseven is a documentary-style reality show on MTV that documented the lives of seven male friends seeking fame and fortune in Hollywood. The show was described as a "real" version of Entourage, in the same manner that Laguna Beach is the "real" version of The O.C.. The show aired for eight episodes from December 6, 2006 to February 21, 2007.

twentyfourseven aired on Wednesday nights in the Ten Spot block after The Real World. The show faced low ratings and critical derision, and some viewers were suspicious that certain portions of the show were staged for dramatic effect; for instance, Greg Cipes was described as a singer new to the Los Angeles music scene, despite his acting in small live-action roles and voicing characters for animated series for several years.

In a rare move, MTV canceled the series without explanation after three episodes. Though the network refrained from airing any repeats, the series' subsequent episodes premiered each Wednesday afternoon on MTV.com. The iTunes Store hosted the show as well, but iTunes did not post any new episodes after its cancellation.

== Principal cast ==
- Matt Baker – actor
- Chris Carney – lead singer, The Prom Kings
- Greg Carney – club promoter, executive producer
- Greg Cipes – musician/surfer
- Frankie Delgado – club promoter/musician
- Ty Hodges – actor/producer
- Greg Whitman – music producer
