= Frankie Delgado =

Mexican-American actor and producer

- Born: May 30, 1981 (age 45); Tijuana, Mexico
- Occupations: Actor; producer; television personality
- Spouse: Jennifer Acosta (m. 2013)
- Children: 3

Frankie Delgado (born May 30, 1981) is a Mexican-American actor, producer and television personality. He is known for appearing on the reality television series, The Hills.

== Career ==
Delgado first appeared in twentyfourseven, a 2006 MTV television series. In 2007 he began appearing on The Hills, another MTV series, in a total of 41 episodes.

He has also briefly appeared on the series, Keeping Up with the Kardashians, Bromance and Vai Anitta.

As of October 2016, Delgado has collaborated with several night clubs and lounges in Los Angeles and Las Vegas.

In 2017, he participated as an actor and producer in the horror film, Del Playa, loosely based on the events of the 2014 Isla Vista massacre.

At the 2018 MTV Video Music Awards, MTV announced a reboot of The Hills entitled The Hills: New Beginnings, which premiered in 2019. Delgado was announced as part of the cast of the new series.

== Personal life ==
Delgado married Jennifer Acosta in June 2013, after getting engaged to her in 2012; the couple met in summer 2009. Their daughter, Isabella Amalia, was born on May 4, 2014. Their son, Francis Franco, was born on December 16, 2016. Their second son, River Patrick, was born on July 2, 2022.

== Filmography ==
=== As actor ===
Year	Title	Role	Notes
2016	Stars Are Already Dead	Robin	Film
2016	Sprout	Tinhorn Server	TV pilot
2017	Del Playa	Officer Martinez	Film
2019	10 Minutes Gone	Ricky	Film
2019	Be Like Trees	Frankie	Independent film

=== As himself ===
Year	Title	Notes
2006	twentyfourseven	1 episode
2007–2008	Keeping Up With The Kardashians	3 episodes
2007–2010	The Hills	41 episodes
2008	Bromance	3 episodes
2018	Vai Anitta	1 episode
2018	Home With You	Music video for Madison Beer
2019, 2021	The Hills: New Beginnings	Main cast member; 25 episodes

=== As producer ===
Year	Title	Notes
2008	Bromance	
2017	Del Playa	Executive Producer
2018	The 5th Quarter	Associate Producer for one episode
