= Lo Bosworth =

American TV personality

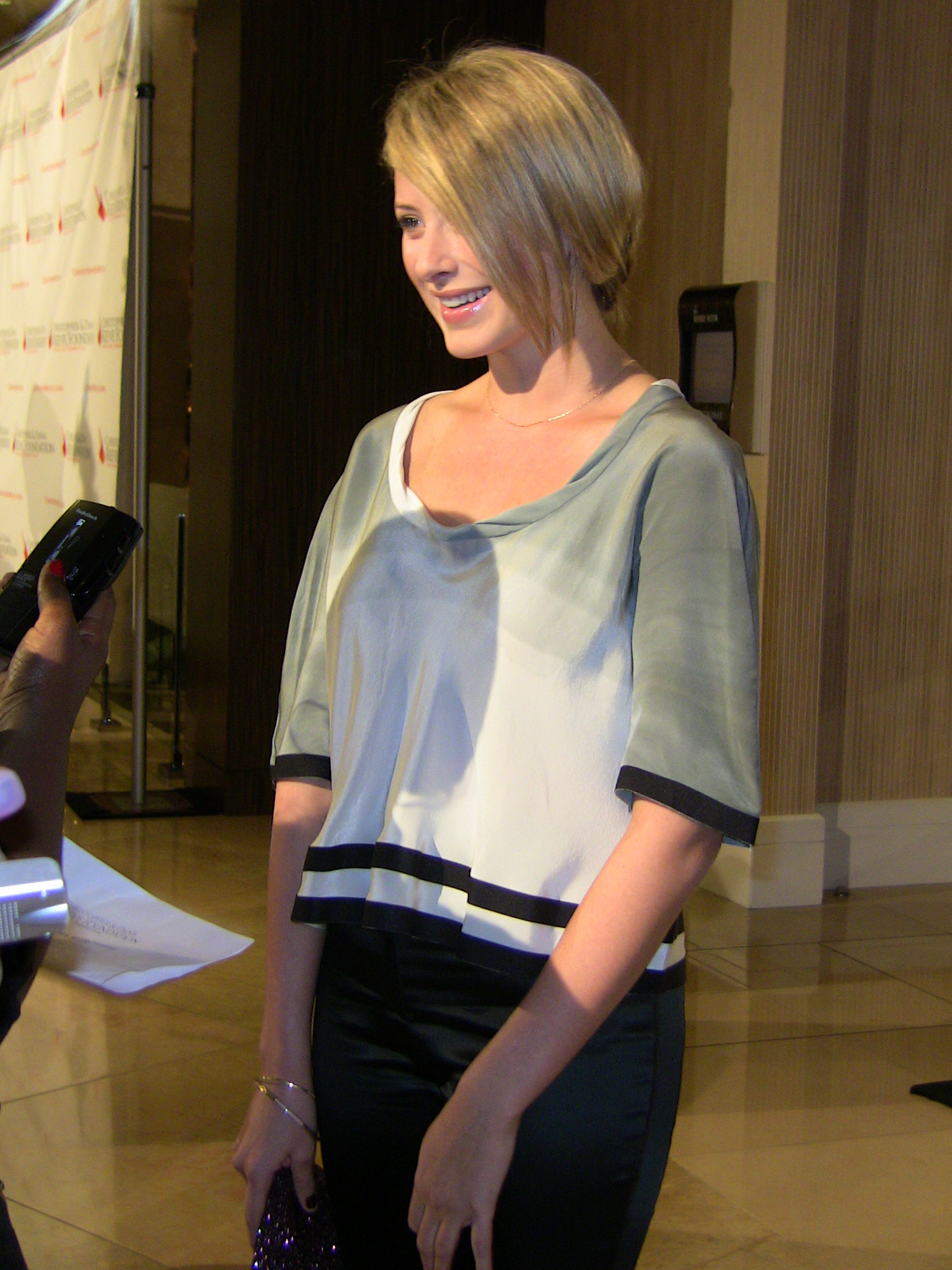
- Bosworth, pictured in December 2008
- Born: Lauren Ogilvie Bosworth; September 29, 1986 (age 39); Laguna Beach, California, U.S.
- Education: University of California, Santa Barbara; University of California, Los Angeles (BA); International Culinary Center
- Occupation: Businesswoman
- Years active: 2004–present
- Spouse: Dom Natale (m. 2025)
- Children: 1
- Website: thelodown.com

Lauren Ogilvie "Lo" Bosworth (born September 29, 1986) is an American former reality television personality, founder and CEO of Love Wellness, and author. Bosworth rose to prominence as a cast member of Laguna Beach: The Real Orange County and The Hills, which documented the lives of her and her friends.

== Early life ==
Bosworth was born on September 29, 1986, and grew up in Laguna Beach, CA, before moving to Los Angeles, CA.

== Career ==
=== Reality television ===
Bosworth appeared on MTV's Laguna Beach: The Real Orange County in 2004, which followed her during her senior year of high school during the first season. She was featured alongside best friend Lauren Conrad and former classmates Kristin Cavallari and Stephen Colletti. She made few appearances during the second season.

After the success of Laguna Beach, MTV developed The Hills, a spin-off series documenting the lives of Conrad and her friends (Heidi Montag, Audrina Patridge, and Whitney Port) in Los Angeles, California. During production of the first season, Bosworth and Conrad were not on speaking terms, which was briefly mentioned on the series as a fight caused by their mutual friend Jen Bunney that lasted nearly two years. After the two reconciled, Bosworth became a supporting cast member during The Hills' second season, first appearing on the series on March 12, 2007.

The third season premiered on August 13, 2007. The season saw Bosworth become housemates with Conrad, and Audrina Patridge as the three moved into a new home, though Patridge eventually moved into her own apartment. The fourth season premiered on August 18, 2008, during which Conrad and Bosworth adopted a dog they named Chloe. The season also saw Bosworth reveal more of her personal life, also allowing cameras into her workplace. The first half of the fifth season premiered on April 6, 2009. Conrad made her final appearance on the series on May 31, 2009, at Heidi Montag and Spencer Pratt's wedding. The second half of the season premiered on September 29, 2009, with former Laguna Beach castmate Kristin Cavallari hired as Conrad's replacement.

The sixth and final season premiered on April 27, 2010. Despite rumors of not returning after the fifth season, Bosworth became a main cast member for the season. She was shown to be dealing with workplace drama, as well as moving in with her boyfriend, Scott. The series concluded on July 13, 2010.

=== Other ventures ===
In 2010, Bosworth launched a website, The Lo Down by Lo Bosworth. She also wrote a book of the same name; it was released in January 2011. In late 2013, Bosworth started her own beauty channel on YouTube, which has grown rapidly since it was created.

In 2016, Bosworth founded Love Wellness.

== Personal life ==
Bosworth attended the University of California, Santa Barbara and later transferred to UCLA where she graduated in June 2008 with a bachelor's degree in art history. While in college, she joined the Kappa Kappa Gamma sorority. Additionally, she graduated with a culinary degree from the International Culinary Center in New York City, after expressing her passion for studying farm-to-table cuisine.

Bosworth married investor Dom Natale on July 20, 2025, at her family home in Laguna Beach. A few days later, she announced that they are expecting their first child. On January 16, 2026, she gave birth to their daughter.

== Filmography ==
Year	Title	Role	Notes
2004–05	Laguna Beach: The Real Orange County	Herself	Main cast member
2007–10	The Hills	Herself	Main cast member
2012	I'm Positive	Executive producer	TV documentary

== Published works ==
- The Lo-Down (2011)
