= Brent Bolthouse =

American businessman

- Born: December 18, 1969 (age 56); Sierra Madre, California, United States
- Occupations: Entrepreneur, event producer, DJ, actor, photographer
- Website: thebungalow.com

Brent Bolthouse is an American entrepreneur, event producer, DJ, actor and photographer from California. He has appeared on MTV's The Hills.

== Career ==
=== 1989-2005: Early career and Bolthouse Productions beginnings ===
In 1987, Bolthouse moved to Los Angeles from Joshua Tree, California. He began working as a club promoter at Opus Lily in 1989, the same year Bolthouse Productions was founded. His early career included promoting the Roxbury, The Viper Room, and the House of Blues. He also opened the Los Angeles clubs Babylon, Opium Den Sunset Blvd.’s Coffee House and the venue Avalon of which he is still currently a partner. Bolthouse is also a partner and co-owner of the Body English night club at the Hard Rock Hotel in Las Vegas. In 1991, Bolthouse partnered with his current business partner Jenifer Rosero.

=== 2005-2010: SBC Bolthouse, SLS & Bolthouse Vox Events ===
In late 2005, Bolthouse Productions and Sam Nazarian’s SBE Entertainment Group announced a partnership to develop, promote, and operate night clubs, supper clubs, restaurants, lounges, and bars. Together with SBE, Bolthouse collaborated on nightlife venues and fine dining establishments including the Hyde Lounge, the nightclub Area, Foxtail, Katsuya, and Chef Michael Mina XIV Restaurant, as well as designer Philippe Starck. However, this partnership was terminated in 2009.

In 2008, Bolthouse began work on the newly opened luxury hotel SLS Hotel Beverly Hills which features the four-star restaurant Bazaar by José Andrés. Upcoming projects include the in-development Sahara Hotel and Casino in Las Vegas. Also in 2008, Bolthouse began co-hosting a weekly radio show “Feel My Heat” on Indie 103.1 with Danny Masterson. The show has been rated by Rolling Stone as number one in the Indie category. Bolthouse is also a DJ. Notable events that he has DJ'd include the Nylon Hot Hollywood Party, Sundance 2009, The Ray-Ban Awards, Victoria's Secret Fashion Show After-Party and Prada Store opening on Rodeo Drive. He also appeared in Jessica Simpson's video "A Public Affair" as a DJ.

In early 2009, Bolthouse Productions partnered with VOX Entertainment to form Bolthouse VOX Events. Clients have included HBO, Mercedes-Benz, T-Mobile, Vanity Fair and Prada. Later, in March 2009, Bolthouse VOX announced a joint venture with Wolfgang Puck Catering through which Bolthouse VOX events can be catered by Wolfgang Puck. Bolthouse Productions and Vox have since gone their separate ways.

=== 2010-Present: Neon Carnival, Partnership with Best Events & The Bungalow Santa Monica ===
In 2011, Bolthouse Productions partnered with LA-based production company Best Events to pursue creative opportunities, including establishing the Warwick lounge on Sunset Boulevard which opened in 2013. The offices are located in a residential duplex in the Fairfax District in Los Angeles, with Bolthouse Productions in one space and Best Events in the other. The current Bolthouse Productions is small and has less than 5 in-office employees.

In August 2012, Bolthouse opened a restaurant and bar called The Bungalow at the Fairmont Miramar Hotel & Bungalows in Santa Monica, CA. It was announced in September 2014 that Bolthouse would be expanding the brand and opening a new location at Pacific City in Huntington Beach. The second location is set to open in 2016. As of November 2015, The Bungalow Huntington Beach will serve Bear Flag Fish Co. as its exclusive culinary partner.

In November 2018 it was announced that The Bungalow Hospitality Group would be expanding its portfolio by partnering with chef and restaurateur Chef Michael Mina and the MINA Group on the launch of The Bungalow in Long Beach, CA and San Diego, CA.

Bolthouse founded Neon Carnival, a festival which takes place in Coachella Valley.

== Filmography ==
=== Film ===
Year	Title	Role	Other notes
1992	Waxwork II: Lost in Time	Cabbie #2	
1992	Hellraiser III: Hell on Earth	CD	
1993	Warlock: The Armageddon	Guard	
1993	Deadly Exposure	Manager	
1993	Full Eclipse	Dr. Bobby Rose	
1995	The Immortals	Dan	
1996	Cityscrapes: Los Angeles	Tat	
1999	Desperate but Not Serious	Steve	

=== Television ===
Year	Title	Role	Other notes
2006–2009	The Hills	Self	21 episodes
2007–2010	Entourage	Self	2 episodes
