= Lisa Love (editor) =

American journalist

- Born: January 10, 1955 (age 71); Cincinnati, Ohio; United States
- Children: 2

Lisa Love (born February 10, 1955) is an American fashion journalist and former model. Love notably served as West Coast director of Vogue from 1990 to 2018 and starred as herself in The Hills.

== Early life and education ==
Love was born in Cincinnati in February 1955, however days after her birth she moved to Rome. Her father was in charge of advertising at Procter & Gamble. In 1966, the family moved to London. She would later live in Geneva.

Love studied painting at the School of the Museum of Fine Arts in Boston. In 1975, Love attended a residency at the Skowhegan School of Painting and Sculpture.

== Career ==
In 1971, Love interned at the Metropolitan Museum of Art. Around 1975 when working in Boston as an artist, she met and worked with Arthur Elgort. After this she moved to Paris to pursue modelling fulltime. Love would feature on the cover of L'Officiel in 1979.

Love moved to Los Angeles in 1982 and worked as a chauffeur for Andy Warhol when he visited the city.

In 1987, joined Interview as West Coast editor. She exited the magazine in 1990 to serve as West Coast director for Vogue. Later, Love would serve as West Coast Editor at Teen Vogue. She also assisted at the Met Gala. In 2018, Love exited her positions at Vogue and Teen Vogue, joining Condé Nast consultancy agency CNX. Love now serves as creative director of the Academy Museum Gala and contributing editor of events and experiences at Vogue.

== Personal life ==
Since childhood, Love has been friends of photographer Pamela Hanson. In 1971, Love was in a relationship with American filmmaker Michel Negroponte.

Love has two children, Natalie Love and fashion model Laura Love.

== Filmography ==
Year	Title	Role	Notes
2002	Adaption	Orlean dinner guest	
2006–2008	The Hills	as Herself	TV series, 19 episodes
2008	The City	as Herself	TV series, 1 episode (archival footage)
2010	Promises Written in Water	Grieving Woman	
2014	The Annual Princess Grace Awards Gala	as Herself	TV Special
2016	The Fashion Fund	as Herself	TV series, 1 episode
2018	Entertainment Tonight Canada	as Herself	TV series, 1 episode
2019	The Hills: New Beginnings	as Herself	TV series, 1 episode (archival footage)
