= The Hills (TV series) =

American reality television series

- Genre: Reality television
- Created by: Adam DiVello
- Starring: Lauren Conrad; Heidi Montag; Audrina Patridge; Whitney Port; Kristin Cavallari; Lo Bosworth; Stephanie Pratt
- Narrated by: Lauren Conrad; Kristin Cavallari
- Theme music composer: Natasha Bedingfield; Danielle Brisebois; Wayne Rodrigues
- Opening theme: "Unwritten" by Natasha Bedingfield
- Country of origin: United States
- Original language: English
- No. of seasons: 6
- No. of episodes: 102 (list of episodes)

Production
- Executive producers: Liz Gateley; Sean Travis
- Production locations: Los Angeles, California
- Camera setup: Multiple
- Running time: 20–43 minutes
- Production companies: Done and Done Productions

Original release
- Network: MTV
- Release: May 31, 2006 – July 13, 2010

Related
- Laguna Beach: The Real Orange County; The City; The Hills: New Beginnings; Audrina; Very Cavallari

The Hills is an American reality television series that aired for six seasons on MTV from May 31, 2006, until July 13, 2010. Developed as a spin-off of Laguna Beach: The Real Orange County, the series focused on the personal and professional lives of several young women and men residing in Los Angeles, California. Its premise was conceived by Adam DiVello, while Liz Gateley and Sean Travis served as executive producers.

The series originally focused on Lauren Conrad, who had already appeared in Laguna Beach: The Real Orange County, as she pursued a career in the fashion industry. It additionally placed emphasis on her housemate, Heidi Montag, and their friends Audrina Patridge and Whitney Port. Conrad's friend Lo Bosworth and Montag's boyfriend Spencer Pratt developed major positions as part of the supporting cast in the second season, while his sister Stephanie Pratt was added in the third. Port left the series at the conclusion of the fourth season, moving to New York City and starring in her own spin-off, The City, which aired for two seasons.

Looking to pursue other career opportunities, Conrad left the series halfway through the fifth season, and was subsequently replaced by fellow Laguna Beach: The Real Orange County cast member Kristin Cavallari. Bosworth and Stephanie Pratt joined Cavallari and Patridge as primary cast members in the sixth and final season, while Montag and her husband Pratt were removed from the series after displaying erratic behavior. Conrad briefly returned to the series during an alternate ending for its finale.

The Hills received moderately favorable reviews from critics and has been recognized as a "guilty pleasure" by several media outlets. However, the series was often criticized for tending towards a narrative format more commonly seen in scripted genres including soap operas, and appearing to fabricate much of its storyline. The show has produced several spin-offs, as well as distributed all seasons to DVD. Since its conclusion, the special The Hills: That Was Then, This Is Now, starring Conrad, was aired on August 2, 2016, and the sequel series The Hills: New Beginnings premiered on June 24, 2019.

== Conception ==
In 2004, the reality television series Laguna Beach: The Real Orange County premiered on MTV. The program was created by Liz Gateley and documented the lives of several students attending Laguna Beach High School as they completed secondary education. The series proved among the network's most successful programming, though the entire original cast left after the second season and were replaced by another group of teenagers for the following season.

Television producer Adam DiVello developed the spin-off program The Hills to follow one of its predecessor's original cast members, Lauren Conrad, as she moved to Los Angeles to pursue a career in the fashion industry.

== Series synopsis ==
=== Overview and casting ===
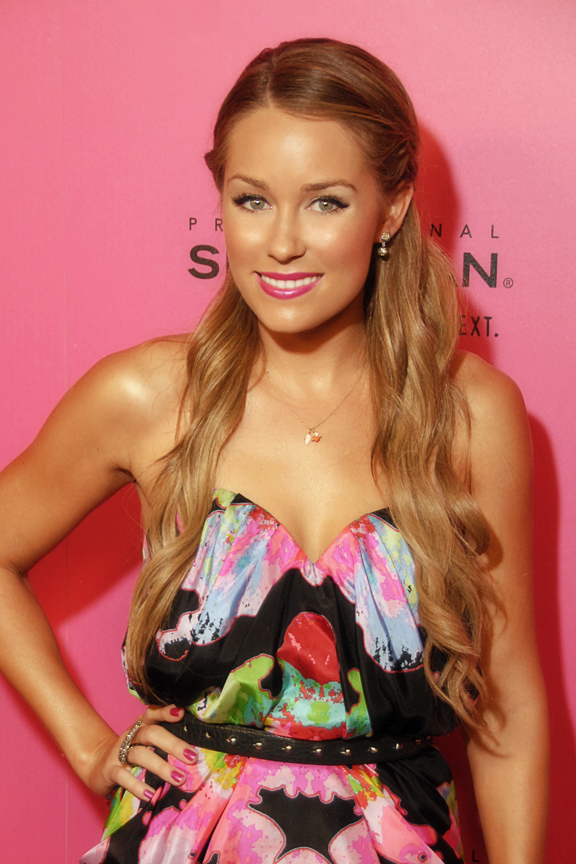
Lauren Conrad served as the series' central focus for the first five seasons.

The Hills chronicles the lives of several young women and men living in Los Angeles, California. Every installment commences with a voice-over narrative from series leads Lauren Conrad (seasons 1–5) or Kristin Cavallari (seasons 5–6), foreshadowing the theme of the episode. Each season concludes with a finale, typically involving a major event such as a progressing relationship or a personnel departure. Most installments revolve around the women's everyday lives, with the intention of balancing coverage of their personal and professional endeavors.

Throughout its run, the series was led by three (season 5) and four (seasons 1–4, 6) primary cast members, who were credited by their first names. Its original main cast members were Conrad, Heidi Montag, Audrina Patridge, and Whitney Port. Upon the conclusion of the fourth season, Port moved to New York City after receiving employment with Diane von Fürstenberg and was commissioned to star in the spin-off The City.

During this time, Conrad wished to leave the series to pursue other career opportunities, though she filmed ten episodes in the following season to close her storylines. After departing halfway through the fifth season, she was replaced by Cavallari, a fellow former Laguna Beach: The Real Orange County cast member. The sixth and final season saw Conrad's friends Lo Bosworth and Stephanie Pratt, who were respectively featured as supporting roles since the second and third seasons, become primary cast members. Halfway through the season, Montag left the series after the cast looked to disassociate themselves from her uncharacteristic antics.

The aforementioned women's storylines were largely developed by a number of supporting cast members. Spencer Pratt, originally credited as "Heidi's boyfriend" and later "Heidi's husband", was added in the second season. Also that season, Brody Jenner was introduced as "Spencer's friend". After establishing a friendship with Conrad, he became known as "Lauren's friend". Jenner was later credited as "Kristin's ex-boyfriend" when Cavallari assumed Conrad's position in the fifth season.

In the third season, Frankie Delgado was established as "Brody's friend". His title was adjusted as "Lauren's friend" the following season, and was eventually reverted to "Brody's friend" during the fifth season. Since the third season, Justin-Bobby was recognized as "Audrina's ex", "Audrina's boyfriend", or "Audrina's ex-boyfriend" Holly Montag, credited as "Heidi's sister", was added to the series in the fourth season.

In the fifth season, Stacie Hall was introduced to the series as "bartender" when working at The Dime, and later became "the bartender" after the conflict between herself, Montag, and Pratt came to fruition. After the conflict settled, Hall remained on the series as "Kristin's friend".

=== Timeline of cast members ===
Name	Seasons						
Name	1	2	3	4	5a	5b	6
Name	Main cast members						
Lauren Conrad	Main						Guest (Note: Appeared in an alternate version of the series finale, which was not aired by MTV until three years after the show ended.)
Audrina Patridge	Main						
Whitney Port	Main						
Heidi Montag	Main						
Kristin Cavallari					Guest	Main	
Lo Bosworth		Guest	Recurring				Main
Stephanie Pratt			Recurring				Main
	Notable supporting cast members						
Jordan Eubanks	Recurring						
Brian Drolet	Recurring						
Jason Wahler	Recurring	Guest	Recurring				
Jen Bunney		Recurring			Guest		
Spencer Pratt		Recurring					
Brody Jenner		Recurring					
Frankie Delgado		Guest	Recurring				
Justin "Bobby" Brescia			Recurring				
Holly Montag				Recurring			
Stacie Hall					Recurring		

=== Storylines ===
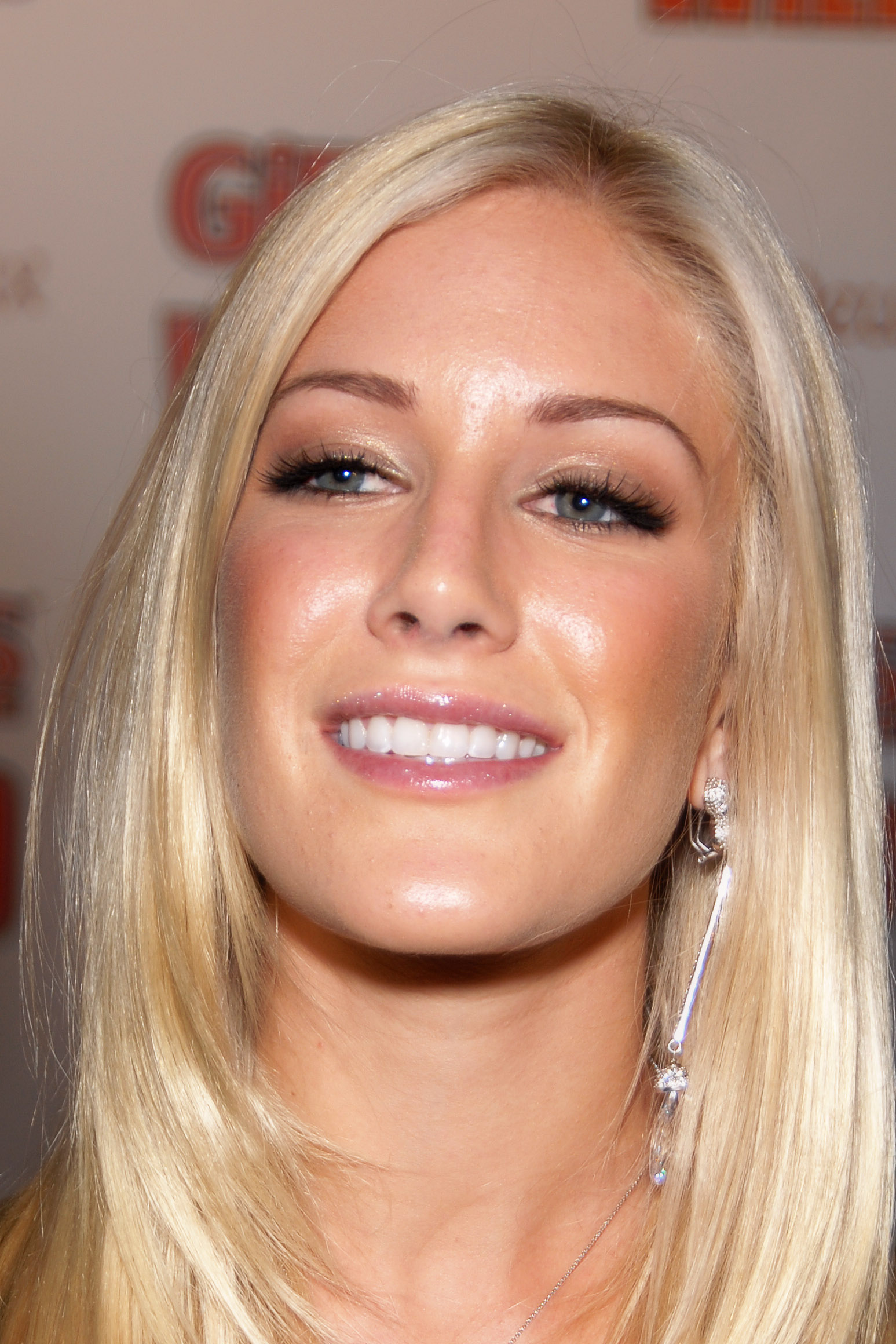
Heidi Montag began a relationship with Spencer Pratt, which ended her friendship with Lauren Conrad.

In its series premiere, The Hills first introduced Lauren Conrad, who moved from Laguna Beach, California to Los Angeles to pursue a career in the fashion industry. She and her housemate Heidi Montag originally planned to attend the Fashion Institute of Design & Merchandising, though the latter left the college after receiving employment with Bolthouse Productions. Montag befriended their neighbor Audrina Patridge, while Conrad bonded with her fellow Teen Vogue intern Whitney Port. The remainder of the first season highlighted romantic relationships, including Montag's and Patridge's brief relationships with Jordan Eubanks and Brian Drolet respectively. The season concluded with Conrad's rejection of a summertime internship in Paris to reunite with her former boyfriend Jason Wahler. Consequentially, Port was offered and accepted the position in Conrad's place.

By the beginning of the second season, Conrad and Wahler had ended their relationship, while Montag began dating Spencer Pratt. Montag increasingly spent more time with Pratt and neglected her friendship with Conrad, which placed a strain on the pair's friendship. Consequentially, Conrad strengthened her relationship with her friend Lo Bosworth and took a romantic interest in Pratt's friend Brody Jenner. Montag and Pratt moved into an apartment together in the season finale, at which point Patridge became Conrad's new housemate.

In the third season, Conrad ended her friendship with Montag after suspecting that she and Pratt fabricated rumors of a sex tape involving herself and Wahler. The ensuing feud between the women became a central focus of the series and was carried through each subsequent season in which Conrad appeared. Montag and Pratt became engaged, while Patridge resumed a turbulent romantic relationship with her friend Justin "Justin Bobby" Brescia. After Conrad established companionships with Jenner and his friend Frankie Delgado, Pratt severed ties with both men.

In light of the building feud, Spencer's sister Stephanie Pratt initially took a disliking to Conrad. However, she later apologized to Conrad for an earlier confrontation, and the pair became friends. Their relationship put a burden on Pratt's relationship with her brother and Montag, who reacted by beginning to alienate her. Conrad and Port eventually left their positions at Teen Vogue after receiving employment from Kelly Cutrone's PR firm People's Revolution. By the end of the season, Conrad and Patridge had left their apartment and purchased a home, with new housemate Bosworth becoming a distancing factor between the former two.

The fourth season saw Patridge reconcile with Bosworth and repair her relationship with Conrad before moving into a separate residence. Holly Montag moved from her hometown of Crested Butte, Colorado into her sister and Pratt's apartment, which created tension between the sisters and Pratt. Montag was later fired from her job with Bolthouse after becoming drunk during a company event. While vacationing in Mexico, an intoxicated Montag and Pratt elope. In the season finale, Conrad and Montag appear to have reconciled, though Conrad's suspicions regarding the rumors continued to inhibit a reconciliation. Port eventually relocated to New York City to accept a position with Diane von Fürstenberg.

As the fifth season began, Spencer Pratt developed a flirtatious bond with a local bartender Stacie Hall, to the dismay of Montag. Per Montag's request to salvage their relationship, Pratt agreed to attend couples' therapy. As they became re-engaged and decided to officially marry, Conrad initially declined an invitation to the wedding. In an attempt to change her mind, Pratt called Conrad and apologized for spreading the rumors. After much additional deliberation, Conrad made her final appearance on the series during the mid-season finale, where she attended the nuptials and reconciled with Montag.

Kristin Cavallari caught the bouquet at the wedding and assumed the series' lead beginning in the second half of the season. She began a causal relationship with Brescia, at which point Patridge severed ties with him. Afterwards, the women developed a feud that continued through the remainder of the season. Meanwhile, Montag and Pratt purchased a new house and clashed over the decision to begin a family; Montag wished to have children, while Pratt opposed the thought.

Before filming for the sixth season commenced, Montag garnered significant criticism after undergoing ten cosmetic surgery procedures in one day. In the premiere, she traveled to her hometown Crested Butte to unveil the results to her family. After unexpectedly receiving much disapproval, she and her husband Pratt alienated themselves from their relatives. Having later displayed additional instances of erratic and unusual behavior, their respective sisters decided to exclude them from their lives. Having dated several years prior, Cavallari and Jenner become flirtatious once more, though the former was taken aback after the latter started seeing another woman.

Meanwhile, Stephanie Pratt struggled to begin dating after being arrested for driving under the influence, but later became involved in a relationship. Patridge became involved in a brief relationship with singer Ryan Cabrera and settled as friends with Brescia, while Bosworth moved in with her boyfriend Scott.

During the final episode of the series, Cavallari decides to move to Europe. In the final scene, Jenner is shown to be watching the limousine bringing Cavallari to the airport travel down her street. With the camera on Jenner, the Hollywood Hills backdrop is pulled away, while the camera pans back to reveal that the entire scene was filmed on a backlot. In reality, the vehicle had not driven off and Cavallari stepped out of the vehicle to hug Jenner.

An alternate ending to the series was broadcast in August 2013. The scene depicts Jenner returning to his apartment after seeing Cavallari's limousine off to Europe. Lauren Conrad is revealed to be sitting on his couch, and comforts him that "it's hard to say goodbye" to a "friend of [his]", before the camera focuses on a smiling Conrad.

== Reception ==
=== Critical response ===
The Hills received lukewarm reviews among critics. The series' first season holds a score of 52 out of 100 on Metacritic, indicating "mixed or average reviews", based on eight reviews. Robert Abele of LA Weekly complimented the program for being "insanely watchable", while Variety's Brian Lowry criticized the storylines as being "as old as they come". The second season garnered more favorable feedback, with Virginia Heffnernan of The New York Times opining that Conrad "now registers as charm". After the falling-out between Conrad and Montag in the third season, Heffernan also commented that The Hills "is more convincing than Friends and just about any other comedy about female relationships because—as anyone who has ever been a young woman knows—undying friendships die".

The decision to replace the departing Conrad with Cavallari halfway through the fifth season was met with a mixed response. Tim Stack of Entertainment Weekly expressed interest in the route the series would take, writing that the latter would "be fully prepared to stir things up". After the premiere of the first episode under her lead, a writer from PopSugar criticized Cavallari's "sassy, bad-girl attitude" for lacking originality and preferred Conrad for "[keeping] it real". In contrast, Amy Kaufman from Los Angeles Times opined that Cavallari was more intriguing than Conrad, whose storylines she felt had been overshadowed as the series progressed.

The original series finale during the sixth season garnered a generally negative critical response. Emily Exton from Entertainment Weekly described it as "probably a bit confusing" for the series' earlier viewers, in light of the casting adjustments in later seasons. A writer for Gawker criticized that "as the camera zooms out into the South California nothingness, nothing has changed, and neither audience nor cast is for the better". However, a writer from People was more positive, feeling that the conclusion was a "surprise twist".

Similarly, critics were ambivalent towards the alternate finale. Jenna Mullins from E! praised Conrad's return as being "shocking and glorious at the same time", and felt that "clearly [viewers] should all prefer the ending with Lauren Conrad". Kaitlin Reilly from Bustle described the suggestion of another love triangle involving Conrad and Cavallari to "[feel] vaguely like the ending to a horror movie" in that "it's starting again", but nonetheless appreciated the ending as "a wink to loyal fans". Billy Niles from Zap2It noted that there was "no winking nod to a soundstage", and opined that "nothing that freaking awesome happened". Sonya Sorich of the Ledger-Enquirer preferred the original conclusion, commenting that the revised clip was not as "startling" as the first. Lindsey Weber from Vulture suggested that the footage felt like a "total soap opera" in that it seemingly acknowledged that portions of the series were fabricated.

During its run, The Hills received several accolades from media outlets. It was recognized at number 82 on Entertainment Weekly's list of the 100 New TV Classics. The series has been labeled as a guilty pleasure by writers for HuffPost, MSN, and BuzzSugar.

=== Scripting allegations ===
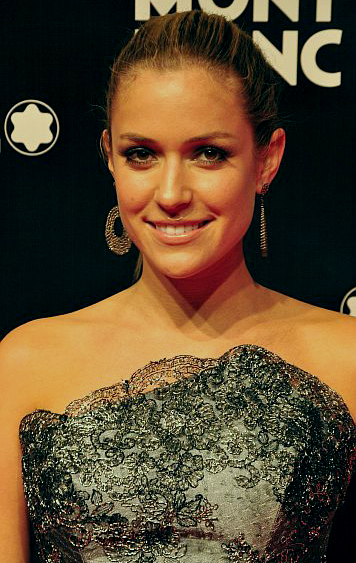
Kristin Cavallari acknowledged that much of her involvement in The Hills was scripted.

The Hills was often criticized for appearing to fabricate much of its storyline. In one instance, the president of entertainment for MTV, Brian Graden, commented that the series benefits from the media coverage it receives in between seasons, which he described as a "six-month commercial for the show that doesn't give away the narrative in full." He elaborated that MTV wants "viewers to watch Lauren and the girls as the characters we know instead of in a show about being the stars of The Hills"; the sex tape rumors were consequently presented like a personal conflict between the women and was intentionally not addressed as a highly publicized controversy.

In 2008, Patridge noted that a producer offered her a position on the series to become friends with Conrad and Montag. She later appeared on an episode of Chelsea Lately, where Chelsea Handler suggested the program was improvised. When pressed further, Patridge replied, "We're put in situations where however we'd react and that's what comes up [on TV]", and additionally stated that the series was unscripted. In 2008, Montag and Pratt acknowledged that their Mexican elopement was "entirely symbolic", while their civil ceremony was filmed after office hours without a county court judge present. Additionally, the Associated Press noted that neither person had filed for a marriage record at the time. An additional source of suspicion arose during the fifth season, where Conrad was shown to be moving out of her house the day prior to Montag and Pratt's nuptials. However, Conrad and Bosworth had actually left the property several months prior in January, leading to speculation that addressing the wedding as "the next day" was pre-planned.

After leaving The Hills, Conrad appeared on The View in June 2009, where she was asked how she felt about her apology from Pratt involving the sex tape rumors. She replied, "To be perfectly honest, I wasn't on the other line of that call [...] I didn't even know about it until [afterwards], so no, I didn't get an apology, he's lying". At Montag and Pratt's wedding, it was depicted on the series as if Conrad and Cavallari were displeased with each other's presence, though the latter commented that they gave each other "a big hug, and that's it". She also stated that when she joined The Hills, "It's work! And drama sells. I think that's why they're bringing me in, because I know what works".

In February 2011, Cavallari told Access Hollywood that the cast followed a "schedule" of events to be filmed on a given day, adding, "We only filmed The Hills three days a week, and we did three different scenes each day and a change of clothes to film a specific scene [...] They were pushing it as far as they could go without an actual script... They give you a schedule like, 'You have lunch with Heidi [Montag] at 3 to talk about the party coming up' or whatever the situation may be". She had earlier commented that she felt viewers "need to understand it's all entertainment" and she "would never put [her] close friends or a real relationship on a show".

Cavallari later told Ryan Seacrest that her relationships with Jenner and Brescia were fabricated, and make a point of saying that it was very difficult for her to pretend to be romantically interested in the "unattractive" and "unlikable" Brescia. In October 2012, in an interview with Allure, Conrad stated that while "the story told wasn't a dishonest one, the way [the producers] did it sometimes was". She elaborated that scenes would be reenacted if cameras were not present for a significant occurrence between cast members, and commented that her relationship with Jenner was "pretty brief" and "definitely [edited] to drag it out". In July 2013, when discussing the filming of several alternate finale endings, MTV acknowledged that "maybe the term 'reality TV' didn't perfectly apply to The Hills". A 2016 online article from Glamour magazine outlined 7 completely fabricated storylines on the show, including the fact that Spencer and Audrina never had any romantic interactions and the way that Spencer and Heidi lived in his parents' house and couldn't afford any house of their own, let alone the mansion that they pretended to reside in (https://www.glamour.com/story/7-storylines-on-the-hills-that-were-actually-totally-fake).

=== U.S. television ratings ===
The first season of The Hills maintained a steady viewership of about two million viewers for each weekly episode. During the third season, the series achieved its most-viewed episode, "Paris Changes Everything", on March 17, 2008; it had attracted 4.8 million viewers in its original airing. However, the fourth season premiere experienced a 25 percent ratings decline, attracting 2.6 million viewers, compared to the 3.8 million viewers of the third-season finale. The second half of the fifth season, also Cavallari's first episode as the lead, premiered to 2.1 million viewers, suffering a 30 percent drop from the premiere of the first half. The series finale on July 13, 2010 aired to three million viewers, becoming the peak viewership of the season.

== Episodes ==
Season	Episodes		Originally released	
Season	Episodes		First released	Last released
1	10		May 31, 2006	August 2, 2006
2	12		January 15, 2007	April 2, 2007
3	28	18	August 13, 2007	December 10, 2007
3	28	10	March 24, 2008	May 12, 2008
4	20		August 18, 2008	December 22, 2008
5	20	10	April 6, 2009	May 31, 2009
5	20	10	September 29, 2009	December 1, 2009
6	12		April 27, 2010	July 13, 2010

== Broadcast history ==
The Hills' first season commenced airing on May 31, 2006. The series continued to air on Wednesday evenings until its conclusion on August 2, 2006, at which point it had aired ten episodes. The second season was expanded to twelve episodes and premiered on January 15, 2007, in its new timeslot on Mondays. The finale aired on April 2, 2007. The third season began airing on August 13, 2007, where it remained in the timeslot of the previous season. It is the longest season in the series' history, having broadcast twenty-eight episodes by its finale on May 12, 2008. The fourth season premiered on August 18, 2008, during the Monday schedule. It consisted of twenty episodes, and concluded on December 22, 2008.

Airing of the fifth season was divided into two sections, Part I under Conrad's lead, and Part II after Cavallari was confirmed to join the series. Part I premiered on April 6, 2009, in the same timeslot, and concluded after ten episodes on May 31, 2009. Part II premiered on September 29, 2009, and continued to air on Tuesday evenings. The season aired a total of twenty episodes, split into two equal halves, before finishing on December 1, 2009. The sixth season also aired on Tuesdays and premiered on April 27, 2010. Twelve episodes later, the series ended its run after a total of 102 episodes on July 13, 2010. On July 30, 2007, The Hills began airing on The N and ran there until 2008. In July 2012, MTV aired a month-long morning marathon of The Hills, titled "Retro Mania". The following year, the marathon was renamed "RetroMTV Brunch", and culminated with the airing of an alternate series finale on August 9, 2013. On August 13, 2016, reruns started to air on MTV's new sister channel MTV Classic. As of December 30, 2016, the series has been removed from the schedule.

The Hills entered off-network syndication in 2009, and the fall of that year, Trifecta Entertainment & Media put it into barter syndication and aired it on affiliates of Fox, MyNetworkTV, The CW, and Independent stations. However, in fall 2012, the show left local syndication along with Punk'd and Laguna Beach due to lack of ratings.

== Spin-offs ==
=== The City ===
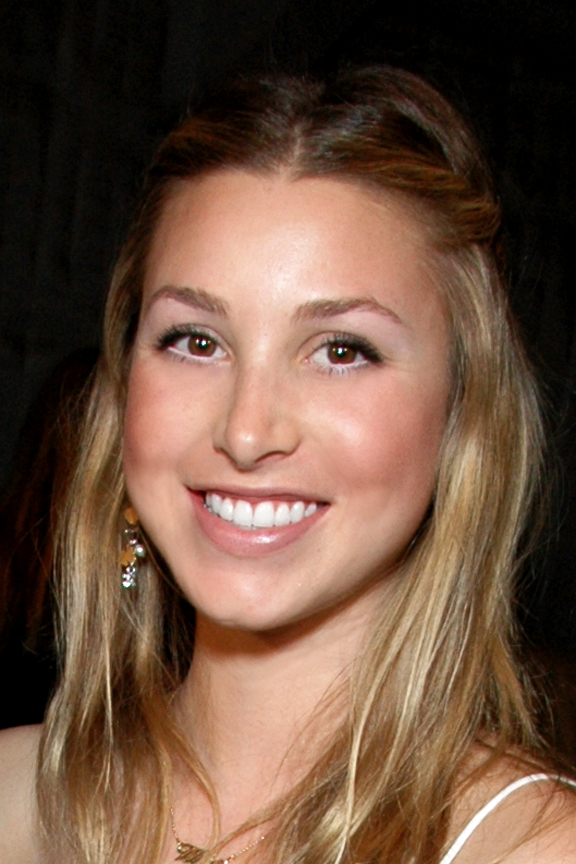
Whitney Port's spin-off aired two seasons.

Beginning in 2008, cast member Whitney Port starred in her own spin-off series The City. The program premiered on December 29, 2008, one week after the fourth-season finale of The Hills. When she appeared on the original series' earlier seasons, she limited the exposure of her personal life, commenting that focusing on her career would make people "take [her] seriously".

However, during production of The City, Port wanted to feature her private life to emphasize that "[her] head is still screwed on straight". During the first half of the debut season, the program highlighted her transition to New York City after receiving employment from Diane von Fürstenberg. However, Port later left her position and returned to People's Revolution with Kelly Cutrone.

The series underwent several casting adjustments for the second half of the first season. Port and Olivia Palermo remained, and the program saw the addition of Port's friend Roxy Olin and Palermo's co-worker Erin Kaplan. The revamped cast remained for the second season, which premiered after the sixth season of The Hills on April 27, 2010. The season documented the deterioration of Port and Olin's friendship, which culminated with the latter moving out of their shared apartment. The season concluded on July 13, 2010, the same evening as the series finale of The Hills.

In October 2010, Port confirmed that The City would not be renewed by MTV.

=== The Hills: New Beginnings ===
At the 2018 MTV Video Music Awards, MTV announced a reboot of The Hills entitled The Hills: New Beginnings. The Hills: New Beginnings will reunite original cast members, alongside their children, friends, and returning favorites, and follow their personal and professional lives while living in Los Angeles. It premiered on June 24, 2019. Heidi Montag, Spencer Pratt, Stephanie Pratt, Audrina Patridge, Whitney Port, Jason Wahler, and Frankie Delgado are all set to return. It was revealed by People that Lauren Conrad, the original star of The Hills, will not be returning for the reboot. Us Weekly confirmed that Kristin Cavallari, who replaced Conrad as star of The Hills in season six, and Lo Bosworth, who was a main cast member for season six, will also not be returning. Us Weekly also reported that Cory in the House star Kyle Massey has been added to the cast, as well as two bloggers; however, this was denied by other sources.

=== Other spin-offs ===
Aside from The City, The Hills spawned two additional related series and one proposed program. Cutrone received her own spin-off program Kell on Earth, which premiered on February 1, 2010, on Bravo. It chronicled the daily operations at People's Revolution as well as her private life,

That September, Conrad filmed a pilot episode for a program that would have focused on her professional endeavors, though MTV passed on the project after Conrad preferred not to feature her personal life. Patridge was commissioned the VH1 program Audrina in 2011, which focused on herself and her family. However, the series was canceled after its debut season due to underwhelming ratings.

In May 2022, MTV announced The Hills: Next Gen which was to feature an all-new cast of twentysomethings. However, this never materialized.

== Soundtrack ==
The Hills: The Soundtrack

Studio album by Various artists
- Released: February 13, 2007
- Genres: Pop; Pop rock
- Length: 43:15
- Label: Epic
- Producer: Butch Walker

The soundtrack was released on February 13, 2007.

Track listing

No.	Title	Artists	Length
1.	"Unwritten"	Natasha Bedingfield	3:41
2.	"Boston"	Augustana	4:02
3.	"One Girl Revolution"	Superchick	3:10
4.	"Long Way to Happy"	Pink	3:09
5.	"Rich Girls, Poor Girls"	Everybody Else	4:19
6.	"Walking in L.A."	Missing Persons	2:59
7.	"A Beautiful Life"	Lindsay Lohan	4:07
8.	"I Just Wanna Live"	Good Charlotte	2:55
9.	"Loose Ends"	Imogen Heap	3:23
10.	"Little Razorblade"	The Pink Spiders	4:22
11.	"Replace You"	Samantha Moore	3:50
12.	"Ordinary Superstar"	Danielle Mckee	3:28
13.	"Leavin'"	Jag Star	3:50
14.	"Beautiful in Los Angeles"	Garrison Starr	3:28

== Distribution ==
The Hills episodes aired regularly on MTV in the United States. Most episodes are approximately thirty minutes, and broadcast in standard definition. The series' episodes are also available for download at the iTunes Store. The series was available to watch on Hulu from 2016 to September 2023. Episodes are currently available for viewing through the official MTV website, with a cable provider log in. The series has been available to watch through Paramount+ since it launched in March 2021. The series, in addition to Laguna Beach: The Real Orange County, were premiered in syndication in fall 2009.

Since its debut, Paramount Pictures has released all six seasons of The Hills onto DVD, across seven installments. The first, second, fourth, and sixth seasons' sets each have three discs, while that of the third season includes four. The fifth season's release was divided into Part I and Part II, and are packaged with two discs apiece.
