= It's On Bitch =

- The Hills episode
- Episode no.: Season 5 Episode 11
- Narrated by: Kristin Cavallari
- Production code: 511-30
- Original air date: September 29, 2009
- Running time: 21 minutes (without commercials)

Episode chronology
| ← Previous "Something Old, Something New" | Next → "Mess with Me, I Mess with You" |
- The Hills (season 5)

"It's On Bitch" is the eleventh episode of the fifth season of The Hills. It originally aired on September 29, 2009, on MTV. In the episode, Kristin Cavallari and Audrina Patridge begin a feud involving the latter's ex-boyfriend Justin Brescia, while newlyweds Heidi Montag and Spencer Pratt disagree about having children. It is the first episode in which Cavallari appears as the series' lead, and also marks the first episode in which her predecessor Lauren Conrad does not appear.

"It's On Bitch" was produced by Adam DiVello, Liz Gateley, Kristofer Lindquist, Sara Mast, and Sean Travis. After the season was retroactively divided into Part I and Part II, respectively separating installments featuring Conrad and Cavallari, the episode became the premiere of Part II.

"It's On Bitch" was met with generally mixed reviews from critics, who were ambivalent towards the decision to replace Conrad with Cavallari. According to Nielsen ratings, it was watched by 2.1 million viewers. The episode was released on DVD on April 27, 2010, packaged with the remainder of Part II of the fifth season.

== Plot ==
Newlyweds Heidi and Spencer plan a "welcome back party" upon returning from their honeymoon. Audrina, Lo, and Stephanie become concerned after learning that Kristin was invited, recalling earlier confrontations between her and Lauren. Brody's girlfriend Jayde Nicole is concerned that he still has residual feelings for Kristin, though he dismisses their relationship as being too young and maintains that they are still friendly.

Audrina is dismayed to see that Justin is flirting with Kristin during the party, and Stephanie tells Justin to be respectful of Audrina. Kristin learns of the conflict, and begins yelling at Audrina and Stephanie. As the developing fight almost becomes physical, Kristin yells "if it's going to be like this it's on, bitch!" as the others walk away.

The following day, Audrina rejects an invitation to Frankie's birthday party when she realizes that Kristin will be in attendance. Lo and Stephanie are shocked that Justin tells Kristin that he and Audrina were not officially a couple, but decide against confronting Kristin. Audrina is saddened after hearing of Justin's comments, and is worried that he and Kristin are seeing each other. During a later date with Justin, Kristin confesses that she thought he still has feelings for Audrina, and understands that Audrina looks at her as a threat.

Meanwhile, while looking for houses with Heidi, Spencer is alarmed that she wants have children. Heidi is excited to decorate a nursery in a suburban neighborhood, but is upset that Spencer secured another, more modern rental property without her prior knowledge. She tells him that they should have selected a home together, though Spencer refuses to take her concerns seriously.

== Production ==
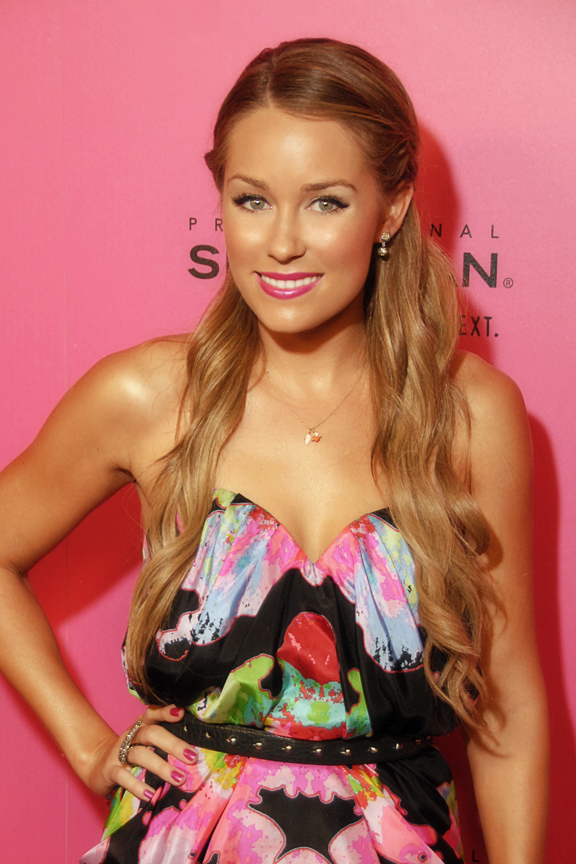
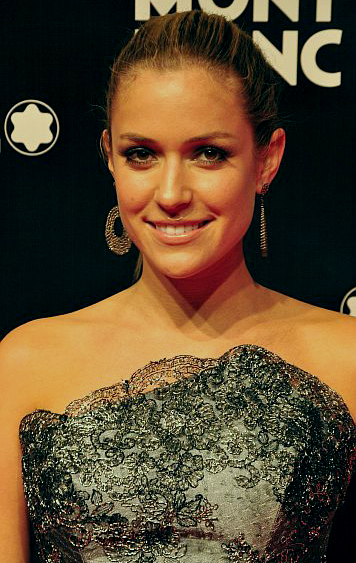
"It's On Bitch" was the first episode in which Lauren Conrad (left) did not appear. After the mid-season finale, it marked the second appearance of Kristin Cavallari (right).

"It's On Bitch" was produced by Adam DiVello, Liz Gateley, Kristofer Lindquist, Sara Mast, and Sean Travis. The episode was filmed throughout May and June 2009.

The series' original lead Lauren Conrad first indicated that she wished to leave The Hills upon the conclusion of its fourth season in December 2008, looking to pursue other career opportunities. She commented that "five years on TV is a really, really long time", adding that she was "ready to walk away". However, per the producers' requests, Conrad filmed ten episodes for the fifth season, in which she closed her storylines. She added that the season was potentially its last, stating that series personnel felt her presence would "give the show some sort of closure".

The tenth episode of the season, "Something Old, Something New", aired on May 31, 2009, and was initially billed as the fifth-season finale. However, in April 2009, MTV announced an extension of the season, and confirmed Cavallari as Conrad's replacement the following month. Consequentially, the first ten episodes of the season were retroactively labeled Part I, while Cavallari's forthcoming episodes were titled Part II. In January 2014, Patridge revealed that the conflict between her and Cavallari had been fabricated at the producers' request, elaborating that "[she] had to leave early for another event, [they] were there for about three hours and [the producers] were like, 'You can't leave until you and Kristin get into a fight.' ... It was about Justin and [they] did it and [they] got to leave."

== Reception and release ==
"It's On Bitch" was met with generally mixed reviews from critics, who were ambivalent towards the decision to replace Conrad with Cavallari. A writer from PopSugar criticized Cavallari's "sassy, bad-girl attitude" for lacking originality and preferred Conrad for "[keeping] it real". Rachel Krasnow from the Weekend Watchers was disappointed in the "overdone" and "ridiculous" scenes involving Cavallari and Brescia, and suggested that they had been staged by producers. Brian Moylan from Jezebel felt that Conrad's departure "doomed the show" and added that he "just [doesn't] get The Hills" despite "[watching] a lot of really trashy television".

In contrast, Amy Kaufman from Los Angeles Times opined that Cavallari was more intriguing than Conrad, whose storylines she felt had been overshadowed as the series progressed. Tracie Egan Morrissey of Jezebel commented that she "kind of [loves] Kristin", and was glad to see her replacing Conrad. Julie Miller from Movieline was critical of the episode's "staged showdowns", but nonetheless noted that the series "continues to compel" like professional wrestling and enjoyed a scene in which Jenner became irritated with Nicole, labeling it the sole genuine reaction of the episode. Writing for Homorazzi, Patrick "loved this episode", and expressed an interest in the love triangle that seemingly develops between Cavallari, Jenner, and Nicole. Furthermore, a writer from The Hollywood Gossip opined that The Hills "can annoy the crap out of you sometimes" but "still entertains" despite appearing to be heavily scripted.

In its original broadcast in the United States on September 29, 2009, "It's On Bitch" was watched by 2.1 million viewers. In doing so, it suffered a 30-percent ratings drop from the season premiere "Don't Cry on Your Birthday", which garnered three million viewers on April 6, 2009. In the country, Season 5, Part II was released as a two-disc DVD set on April 27, 2010.
