= All Good Things... (The Hills) =

- The Hills episode
- Episode no.: Season 6 Episode 12
- Narrated by: Kristin Cavallari
- Production code: 612-30
- Original air date: July 13, 2010
- Running time: 21 minutes (without commercials)

Guest appearance
- Lauren Conrad (alternate ending)

Episode chronology
← Previous "Loves Me Not"	Next → —
- The Hills (season 6)

"All Good Things..." is the series finale of The Hills. It originally aired on MTV on July 13, 2010. In the episode, Lo Bosworth moves into a house with her boyfriend, while Stephanie Pratt begins a romantic relationship. Audrina Patridge finds a house in Hermosa Beach, and Kristin Cavallari decides to leave Los Angeles and move to Europe. The series' final scene reveals that her departure to the airport was filmed in a studio backlot, responding to longtime speculation that the program was scripted.

"All Good Things..." was produced by Adam DiVello, Michael Friedman, Liz Gateley, Josh Lansky, Kristofer Lindquist, and Sara Mast. In addition to being the final episode, it serves as the twelfth installment of the sixth season. The episode received mixed reviews from critics, who were ambivalent towards the final scene. According to Nielsen ratings, it was watched by 3 million viewers, becoming the peak viewership of the season. The episode was released on DVD on September 21, 2010, packaged with the remainder of the sixth season.

Upon the conclusion of their month-long morning marathon of The Hills, titled "RetroMTV Brunch", MTV aired an alternate ending to the series on August 9, 2013. The scene replaced the original backlot clip with footage of Jenner and Lauren Conrad talking in his apartment. Critics appreciated Conrad's return, but also felt that the revision was less shocking than the original clip.

== Plot ==
As Audrina, Lo, Stephanie find themselves content with their lives, Kristin is unsure whether she should pursue her future endeavors. Brody believes that he can maintain a friendship with Kristin, though Frankie and Taylor are concerned that she may still have romantic feelings towards him. That evening, Kristin tells Stacie that she has decided to move to Europe, wanting to have a "new beginning", though Stacie is concerned that she is seeking revenge against Brody.

Meanwhile, Audrina purchases a home in Hermosa Beach, while Stephanie begins a romantic relationship with Josh. To the surprise of the guests, Brody attended Kristin's farewell party that evening. He confesses that he is saddened by her move, but she maintains that the decision is in her best interest. The next day, after much prior deliberation, Lo moves into her boyfriend Scott's house and begins unpacking her belongings.

Brody visits Kristin and Stacie as they pack the last of her belongings before leaving for the airport. After giving their final goodbyes, Brody sees Kristin's limousine off while it drives off her street. As Kristin looks out of the window, a montage of archived footage from the series' earlier seasons is shown. In the final scene of the series, with the camera on Brody, the Hollywood Hills backdrop is pulled away, while the camera pans back to reveal that the entire scene was filmed on a backlot. In reality, the vehicle had not driven off and Kristin stepped out of the vehicle to hug Jenner.

An alternate ending to the series was broadcast in August 2013. The scene depicts Brody returning to his apartment after seeing Kristin's limousine off to Europe. Lauren Conrad is revealed to be sitting on his couch, and comforts him that "it's hard to say goodbye" to a "friend of [his]", before the camera focuses on a smiling Lauren.

== Production ==
"I pushed a lot to air it. I really liked the one with Lauren. It was her story that I started the show with and followed her with Laguna Beach. I always wanted to end it on her face and her being happy. I think that big smile across her face tells exactly how she’s feeling. I think it was just a nice way to end it with her saying 'Goodbye is hard to do.' But yeah, I was in favor of airing this one, but you don’t always have a say in what airs."

— DiVello discusses his preference of an alternate finale in which Conrad was featured.

"All Good Things..." was produced by Adam DiVello, Michael Friedman, Liz Gateley, Josh Lansky, Kristofer Lindquist, and Sara Mast. The sixth season was first announced in December 2009, and was confirmed to be the final season in March 2010. Upon the announcement, speculation arose that original focal point Lauren Conrad would return for the finale. Her former boss Lisa Love suggested that a scene could be filmed of the pair reuniting in Paris, while series creator DiVello wished to see Conrad getting married, presumably to her then-boyfriend Kyle Howard. Cavallari stated that it would be "amazing" to see Conrad return, adding that her appearance would provide the program with "closure". Ultimately, Conrad did not appear in the final episode, but was featured in the live aftershow, The Hills Live: A Hollywood Ending.

DiVello stated that two versions of the final installment were filmed. He provided the MTV with both episodes, and added that he was unaware which version had been selected until it was broadcast. In July 2010, Jenner stated that he had filmed an alternate ending of the series with Conrad, where "I [would] come back home, and basically Lauren's at my place [and I tell her about saying goodbye to a friend]. We filmed this whole lovey-dovey scene as if me and Lauren had been together this entire time", which she confirmed that September.

Upon the conclusion of their month-long morning marathon of The Hills, titled "RetroMTV Brunch", MTV aired the alternate ending to the series on August 9, 2013, which was revealed to be the clip Conrad and Jenner had previously mentioned. DiVello had stated that he preferred the second ending, and upon learning that MTV had not selected it as the original finale, persuaded the network to broadcast the clip.

== Reception and release ==
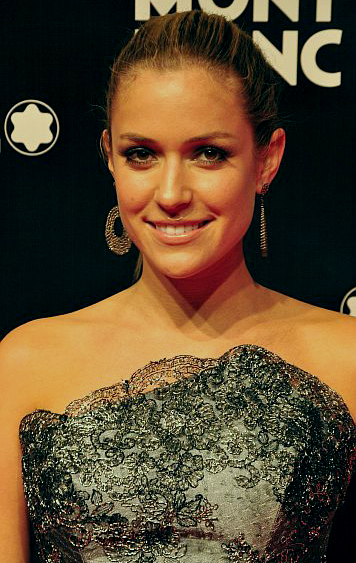
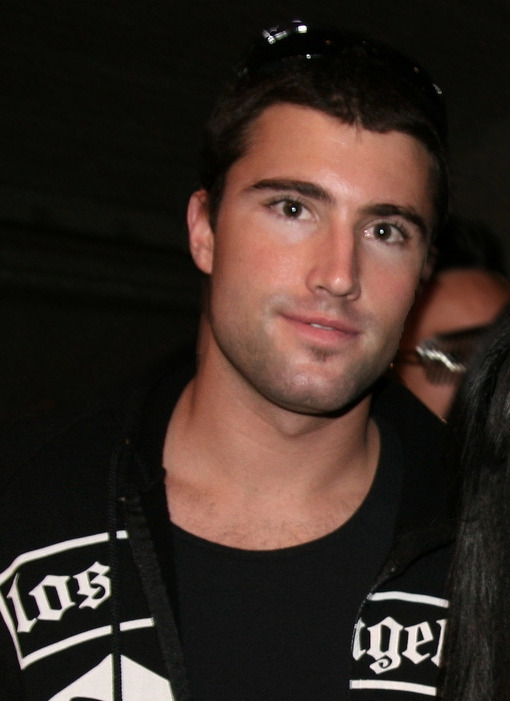
Kristin Cavallari (left) and Brody Jenner (right) were featured in the original final scene of "All Good Things..."

"All Good Things..." was met with generally mixed reviews from critics, many of whom were ambivalent towards the final scene. Despite criticizing the episode's recurring theme of moving on, Emma Rosenblum from Vulture appreciated the ending as an "interesting twist". Andy Dehnart of Reality Blurred felt that, from a production standpoint, the final scene was "really well-done" and appeared realistic despite being filmed in a backlot. In contrast, Chadwick Matlin was displeased to see producers "capitalizing" on the controversy surrounding longtime scripting allegations, which he felt exploited its naive teenage fanbase. A writer for Daily News described the episode as "bittersweet" and "emotional", but felt that the program "overstayed its welcome". Megan Friedman from Time called the ending "surprisingly smart", but felt it did not leave an impact on viewers who were already skeptical of the series' truthfulness.

Similarly, critics were ambivalent towards the alternate finale. Jenna Mullins from E! praised Conrad's return as being "shocking and glorious at the same time", and felt that "clearly [viewers] should all prefer the ending with Lauren Conrad." Kaitlin Reilly from Bustle described the suggestion of another love triangle involving Conrad and Cavallari to "[feel] vaguely like the ending to a horror movie" in that "it's starting again", but nonetheless appreciated the ending as "a wink to loyal fans". Billy Niles from Zap2It noted that there was "no winking nod to a soundstage", and opined that "nothing that freaking awesome happened." Sonya Sorich of the Ledger-Enquirer preferred the original conclusion, commenting that the revised clip was not as "startling" as the first. Lindsey Weber from Vulture suggested that the footage felt like a "total soap opera" in that it seemingly acknowledged that portions of the series were fabricated.

In its original broadcast in the United States on July 13, 2010, "All Good Things..." was watched by 3 million viewers. In doing so, it became the peak viewership of the season. In the country, the sixth season was released as a two-disc DVD set on September 21, 2010.
