= The Hills season 5 =

The Hills
- Season 5
- DVD Cover art for Part I (left) and Part II (right)
- Starring: Lauren Conrad; Kristin Cavallari; Heidi Montag; Audrina Patridge
- No. of episodes: 20

Release
- Original network: MTV
- Original release: April 6 – December 1, 2009

Season chronology
- ← Previous; Season 4 Next → Season 6

The fifth season of The Hills, an American reality television series, consists of 20 episodes and was broadcast on MTV. Part I was aired from April 6, 2009, until May 31, 2009, while Part II was aired from September 29, 2009, until December 1, 2009. The season was filmed primarily in Los Angeles, California, with additional footage in Crested Butte, Colorado, Oahu, Hawaii, and Las Vegas, Nevada. Part I was filmed from January to April 2009, while Part II was filmed from May to November 2009. The executive producer was Liz Gateley.

The Hills focuses on the lives of Lauren Conrad, Audrina Patridge, and Heidi Montag. During Part I, Montag and her boyfriend Spencer Pratt nearly ended their turbulent relationship before deciding to marry. The spring finale saw Conrad attend the wedding and reconcile with Montag before making her final appearance on the series. During Part II, Conrad was replaced by fellow former Laguna Beach: The Real Orange County cast member Kristin Cavallari, whose interest in Justin Brescia resulted in a feud with Patridge.

Despite widespread rumors that Conrad wished to leave the series upon the conclusion of the fourth season, producers persuaded her to film ten additional episodes in the beginning of the fifth season to close her storylines. After Cavallari was announced as her replacement, ten additional episodes were ordered to the season. Though her contract confirmed the production of two seasons beyond the fifth, However, the series ended up getting a sixth season renewal that reported to be the final.

== Synopsis ==
The fifth season continues as Lauren Conrad's distaste of estranged friend Heidi Montag's boyfriend Spencer Pratt inhibits a reconciliation between the women. Montag becomes dismayed after learning that Pratt has begun a flirtatious relationship with a local bartender Stacie Hall. After he reluctantly agrees to her ultimatum of attending couples' therapy, they became engaged and decide to marry. Under the impression that their relationship has been repaired, Montag provided Conrad with an invitation to the ceremony, though Conrad initially rejects the offer, feeling that her attendance would justify a relationship that she disapproved of. After receiving a telephone apology from Pratt regarding earlier sex tape rumors, Conrad makes her final appearance on the series during the mid-season finale, where she attended the nuptials and reconciled with Montag.

The second half of the season continues as Kristin Cavallari assumes the lead position in Conrad's absence. She becomes involved in a feud with Audrina Patridge after beginning a relationship with her ex-boyfriend Justin Brescia. Upon returning from their honeymoon, Montag expresses an interest in beginning a family, while Pratt is adamantly against having children. The season concludes as Patridge severs ties with Brescia, while Montag and Pratt decide against having children for the time being, instead choosing to wait for the coming years.

== Cast ==
During the fifth season, Lauren Conrad serves as the series' narrator and focal point. She continues to attend the Fashion Institute of Design & Merchandising and work for Kelly Cutrone's PR firm People's Revolution. Audrina Patridge remains Conrad's close friend, and is employed by Epic Records. Heidi Montag is depicted as Patridge's friend, continues to mend her estranged relationship with former housemate Conrad, and holds a position with Bolthouse Productions.

As in seasons' past, the aforementioned women's storylines are largely developed by a number of supporting cast members. Lo Bosworth is Conrad's best friend and housemate. Montag and her boyfriend Spencer Pratt are disliked by the majority of the cast, who look to disassociate themselves with the couple's antagonistic antics. However, Conrad is friends with their sisters Holly Montag and Stephanie Pratt, through whom Montag attempts to revive their friendship. Brody Jenner, Frankie Delgado, and Doug Reinhardt are mutual friends with the majority of the cast.

Justin Brescia and Jayde Nicole serve as Patridge and Jenner's respective on-again/off-again partners. Stacie Hall was depicted as a flirtatious bartender that strained Montag and the male Pratt's relationship. Charlie Smith was shown to be close friends with the male Pratt. In the workplace, Cutrone is featured as Conrad's boss, while Brent Bolthouse serves as Montag's boss. Kimberly Brandon and Chiara Kramer are shown as Montag and Patridge's respective co-workers and friends.

After Kristin Cavallari became the series' focal point in the second half of the season, the dynamic between cast members was adjusted in response to Conrad's absence. Cavallari herself was friends with Montag and Hall. Patridge became Cavallari's nemesis after their feud began, while Brescia became Cavallari's brief love interest. The storyline was also modified to depict Jenner as Cavallari's former boyfriend, and began to portray a romantic tension.

== Critical reception ==
=== Scripting allegations ===
The Hills was often criticized for appearing to fabricate much of its storyline, and was particularly criticized during the fifth season. One source of suspicion arose when Conrad was shown to be moving out of her house the day prior to Montag and Pratt's nuptials. However, Conrad and Bosworth had actually left the property several months prior in January, leading to speculation that addressing the wedding as "the next day" was pre-planned.

After leaving The Hills, Conrad appeared on The View in June 2009, where she was asked how she felt about her apology from Pratt involving the sex tape rumors. She replied, "To be perfectly honest, I wasn't on the other line of that call. That was filmed and I wasn't on the other end, so I didn't know about it until, so, no, I never did get an apology. He's lying". At Montag and Pratt's wedding, it was depicted on the series as if Conrad and Cavallari were displeased with each other's presence, though the latter commented that they gave each other "a big hug, and that's it".

Cavallari also stated that when she joined The Hills, "It's work! And drama sells. I think that's why they're bringing me in, because I know what works". Cavallari later told Ryan Seacrest that her relationships with Jenner and Brescia were fabricated.

=== U.S. television ratings ===
The second half of the fifth season, also Cavallari's first episode as the lead, premiered to 2.1 million viewers, suffering a 30-percent drop from the premiere of the first half.

== Episodes ==
| No. overall | No. in season | Title | Original release date | Prod. code |
|---|---|---|---|---|
Part 1
| 71 | 1 | "Don't Cry on Your Birthday" | April 6, 2009 | 501-30 |
Lo and Audrina throw Lauren a surprise party, and Heidi shows up uninvited. Spencer gets in a fist-fight at a bar with Stephanie's ex-boyfriend, Cameron, for telling Stephanie about Spencer's flirting with Stacie, the bartender. Lauren and Heidi have a tearful discussion before the party ends.
| 72 | 2 | "Everything Happens for a Reason" | April 6, 2009 | 502-30 |
Heidi finds out about the fight and has a conversation with Stacie. With no other people to turn to, Spencer phones Brody. Unsure what to do about the relationship, Heidi leaves for Colorado.
| 73 | 3 | "I'm Done with You" | April 13, 2009 | 503-30 |
After catching Spencer at a nightclub with Stacie, Heidi delivers an ultimatum. Also, Lauren puts her reputation on the line when she gets Stephanie an internship at People's Revolution. Note: Audrina does not appear in this episode.
| 74 | 4 | "Crazy in Love" | April 20, 2009 | 504-30 |
Spencer agrees to a couples therapy session and confesses that he's "in a nightmare". Meanwhile, Stephanie has a hard time handling work at People's Revolution. While the boys gear up for Hawaii, Brody and Audrina recognize a mutual attraction.
| 75 | 5 | "I Always Had a Little Crush" | April 27, 2009 | 505-30 |
The girls surprise the boys' trip to Hawaii, and Audrina makes a move on Brody when he takes his shirt off at the beach. Heidi's ex-boyfriend, Colby, comes to visit in Los Angeles and shocks Spencer about being a virgin.
| 76 | 6 | "Playmates Bring the Drama" | May 4, 2009 | 506-30 |
Audrina is heartbroken when Jayde, Brody's girlfriend, confronts her about Hawaii, and her effort to get support from Brody crashes and burns when he makes it plain he understands Jayde's anger and he's going to be by her side. Brody later tells Lauren that mending fences with Audrina is not a priority for him and won't become one for a while. Meanwhile, Heidi intercepts a text message from Stacie to Spencer and goes to the nightclub to confront her.
| 77 | 7 | "Keep Your Enemies Closer" | May 11, 2009 | 507-30 |
Lauren trusted Stephanie with an important task at People's Revolution that she didn't follow through on. Kelly finds out and wants Lauren to fire her. Heidi meets up with Stacie and calls her a "rude, home-wrecking slut" while Stacie laughs in her face about what a loser Spencer is and how "lucky" Heidi is to have him. Audrina breaks it off with Justin before he's able to confront her about Hawaii.
| 78 | 8 | "Father of the Bride" | May 18, 2009 | 508-30 |
Spencer tries to save his relationship with Heidi by asking her cowboy father's permission to get married. Lauren fires a devastated Stephanie from her internship at People's Revolution, and Stephanie's clueless response leads to her getting eyerolls from Lauren and an angry public verbal smackdown from Kelly when they show up at the same event. Stephanie also tries to convince Lauren to forgive Heidi before her wedding, and Lauren is uninterested in it.
| 79 | 9 | "Hi Lauren, It's Spencer" | May 25, 2009 | 509-30 |
Lauren is surprised to hear that Lo and Audrina are thinking about attending Heidi's wedding. Heidi goes to visit Lauren at her job at People's Revolution to take her a wedding invitation. Lauren honestly tells her that she doesn't understand why Heidi would want her there and tell her she thinks Heidi is making a huge mistake in marrying Spencer because of "the person that he is". Though she still holds a grudge toward Spencer, Spencer finds the courage to call her and apologize for Heidi's sake. Note: Lauren Conrad later confirmed that she never received an apologetic phone call from Spencer, adding that she has no idea who Spencer was actually talking to during his staged fake apology.
| 80 | 10 | "Something Old, Something New" | May 31, 2009 | 510-60 |
It's Heidi and Spencer's wedding day, and Lauren has a change of heart about the invitation. Surprisingly, someone else is invited as well. After the ceremony, Lauren quietly leaves the church and drives away from The Hills for a final time. Note: The one-hour Spring finale marks Lauren's final appearance on the series and Kristin's first.
Part 2
| 81 | 11 | "It's on Bitch!" | September 29, 2009 | 511-30 |
Kristin starts a war when she makes a move for Justin in front of Audrina. While house-hunting with Heidi, Spencer buys a house without her approval.
| 82 | 12 | "Mess with Me, I Mess with You" | October 6, 2009 | 512-30 |
Kristin tries to make things right with Audrina while continuing to pursue Justin, and Heidi volunteers to baby-sit for the neighbors, which Spencer does not appreciate. Guest stars: Vedera Note: Lo's title is changed to simply "Lo", though she isn't a lead role yet.
| 83 | 13 | "Strike One" | October 13, 2009 | 513-30 |
Kristin is irritated when Justin stands her up at a surprise birthday party for Brody, who gets into another fight with Jayde. Heidi continues to put pressure on Spencer to have kids. Audrina goes to lunch with a mutual friend of her and Justin.
| 84 | 14 | "Old Habits Die Hard" | October 20, 2009 | 514-30 |
Justin apologizes to Kristin with a home-cooked meal but tells Audrina he'll always have feelings for her. Plus, Heidi and Spencer become concerned about Holly's excessive drinking.
| 85 | 15 | "Sorry Boo, Strike Two" | October 27, 2009 | 515-30 |
Heidi and Stephanie sit Holly down for an intervention when she continues drinking. Plus, Kristin gets upset with Justin's head games, and Brody and Jayde get into a fight that leads them to reconsider their relationship.
| 86 | 16 | "I'm Done with You (2)" | November 3, 2009 | 516-30 |
Kristin and Audrina meet face-to-face, and Justin finds himself in hot water. Plus, Spencer finally gives Heidi "babies" for her birthday. Note: This episode marks the first and only time in the show's history to repeat an episode title.
| 87 | 17 | "Onto the Next" | November 10, 2009 | 517-30 |
Audrina gets her heart broken when Justin ends things for good, it's a war of the exes over Brody, and Spencer considers drastic measures to stop Heidi's baby obsession.
| 88 | 18 | "Can't Always Get What You Want" | November 17, 2009 | 518-30 |
Jayde and Brody try to rekindle their relationship, and a distraught Kristin is left on the back burner, again. Meanwhile, Heidi is going to extreme lengths to get what she wants, a baby.
| 89 | 19 | "Mr. Right Now" | November 24, 2009 | 519-30 |
Kristin and Justin's romance reloads when he joins her in Vegas, and Spencer freaks when he uncovers Heidi's pregnancy scheme.
| 90 | 20 | "The Boys of Summer" | December 1, 2009 | 520-30 |
Spencer confronts Heidi about the pregnancy test. Jayde bothers Brody to take a step in their newfound relationship such as moving in together while they're at a friend's wedding, but her insistence that Brody is fortunate she even took him back after the drama with Audrina backfires as he first says he won't discuss it there, and later confirms to his friends he's happily single again. Audrina and Justin have a heated discussion at the beach where Justin claims they were never really a couple and Audrina calls him a selfish, self-centered person who will end up alone and loveless. Kristin and Justin decide to take their relationship to the next level, but she wants him to be completely serious this time.
