= The Hills season 6 =

The Hills
- Season 6
- DVD cover
- Starring: Kristin Cavallari; Heidi Montag; Audrina Patridge; Lo Bosworth; Stephanie Pratt
- No. of episodes: 12

Release
- Original network: MTV
- Original release: April 27 – July 13, 2010

Season chronology
- ← Previous; Season 5

The sixth and final season of The Hills, an American reality television series, consists of 12 episodes and was broadcast on MTV. It aired from April 27, 2010, until July 13, 2010. The season was filmed primarily in Los Angeles, California, with additional footage in Crested Butte, Colorado; Miami, Florida; and Costa Rica, between January and July 2010. Its executive producer was Liz Gateley. This was the only season not to feature the series' original lead Lauren Conrad in any capacity. Fans and critics widely declared it to be the worst season of the series, as the "reality" portion of its reality-TV genre became strained and the scripted stories were seen as increasingly ridiculous, along with the general unhappiness with Kristin Cavallari as the show's "lead character" instead of Lauren.

The Hills focuses on the lives of Kristin Cavallari, Audrina Patridge, Lo Bosworth, Heidi Montag, and Stephanie Pratt. After receiving widespread criticism after having ten cosmetic surgery procedures in one day, Montag unveils the results to her family. After their underwhelming responses, she and her husband Spencer Pratt begin to alienate their family and friends. Meanwhile, Cavallari has become friends with Audrina after feuding with her during the prior season, and resumes a flirtatious relationship with her best friend and ex-boyfriend, Brody Jenner. Audrina finds herself conflicted with her relationship with her on-again/off-again boyfriend Justin Brescia, while Bosworth and the female Pratt are depicted as mutual friends of all.

The series finale garnered media attention after it depicted the final scene being filmed in a studio backlot, responding to longtime speculation that the series was scripted. Three years after the show's finale, and after the conclusion of their month-long morning marathon of The Hills, titled "RetroMTV Brunch", MTV aired an alternate ending to the series on August 9, 2013. The scene replaced the original backlot clip with footage of Jenner and Conrad talking in his apartment.

== Synopsis ==
Kristin and Audrina have revealed to have become friends according to the girls. She also comes to terms with her fading summer romance with Justin. However, after she left the girls abandoned in Miami, rumors about her wild partying and possible drug abuse surface. Meanwhile, Heidi makes a trip to Colorado to show her family the results of her ten plastic surgery procedures. Her entire family disapproves of her surgery, and after returning to Los Angeles, she and Spencer start to alienate their friends and family.

Audrina starts dating her old friend, Ryan Cabrera, when Justin shows interest in being a part of her life once again. Brody meets McKaela Line, and the two begin to date and upset Kristin with their public affection towards each other. Later, McKaela brings her friend Allie Lutz around with her, much to Kristin's disapproval, as the two despise each other. Stephanie starts dating again after her DUI. Lo must make a major decision in her relationship with her boyfriend, Scott.

== Cast ==
Cast member	Notes
Main cast
Kristin Cavallari	LA girl
Audrina Patridge	Kristin, Lo, Heidi and Stephanie's friend, works for Epic Records
Heidi Montag	Kristin, Audrina, and Stephanie's friend (episodes 1–4)
Lo Bosworth	Kristin and Audrina's friend
Stephanie Pratt	Spencer's sister (series regular from episode 5)
Supporting cast
Spencer Pratt	Heidi's husband (episodes 1–4)
Brody Jenner	Kristin's ex-boyfriend and love interest
Holly Montag	Heidi's sister
Stacie Hall	Kristin's friend
Frankie Delgado	Brody's friend
Charlie Smith	Spencer's friend
Ryan Cabrera	Audrina's boyfriend
McKaela Line	Brody's brief love interest, Lo's co-worker
Justin "Bobby" Brescia	Audrina's ex-boyfriend
Allie Lutz	McKaela's best friend, Kristin's enemy

=== Speidi's absence ===
The fourth episode of the season, "This Is Goodbye", which aired on May 18, 2010, marked the final appearance of Heidi Montag and Spencer Pratt from The Hills.

== Episodes ==
No. overall	No. in season	Title	Original release date	Prod. code	US viewers (millions)
91	1	"Put on a Happy Face"	April 27, 2010	601-30	2.738
For the first time since her extensive plastic surgeries, Heidi reveals the new look to her family. Lo, Stephanie, and Audrina confront Kristin about her partying ways after a rocky Super Bowl weekend in Miami. Meanwhile, Brody's attraction to Audrina resurfaces.
92	2	"Rumor Has It"	May 4, 2010	602-30	2.126
Following her DUI, Stephanie tries to reconcile with her brother, Spencer. Kristin blames Stephanie for the rumors about drug use with some egging on from Brody, leading an angry Stephanie to deny her accusations and say there are a lot of people who notice Kristin's behavior before walking away from her. Brody feels jealous of Audrina's new relationship. Heidi reveals her surgically-enhanced new self to her horrified friends.
93	3	"Elephant in the Room"	May 11, 2010	603-30	2.165
Kristin urges Audrina to commit to Ryan, then moves in to get closer to Brody and Spencer has a full-on rage attack at a birthday party for Enzo, leading to Holly telling Heidi that she won't come back if he's around and trading insults with a screaming, unhinged Spencer. Note: Stephanie and Lo do not appear in this episode.
94	4	"This Is Goodbye"	May 18, 2010	604-30	2.134
Kristin, Audrina, Holly, Lo, and Stephanie all agree to Spencer and Heidi from their lives for good after Spencer picks a fight with Audrina at a club and then nearly melts down when Brody confronts him and says he'll kick Spencer's ass if he doesn't shut up. Audrina and Ryan get into an argument over Brody. Brody and Kristin hook-up before deciding to stay single. Note: This episode marks Heidi and Spencer's final appearance on the series, though Heidi continues to receive star billing for the remainder of the season.
95	5	"A New Bird"	May 25, 2010	605-30	1.998
Brody puts his friendship with Kristin on the line when he starts seeing Lo's sorority sister McKaela. Lo sets Stephanie up on a double date. Ryan gives Audrina's friends another chance. Note: Stephanie is now credited as a main cast member.
96	6	"Ghost from the Past"	June 1, 2010	606-30	1.962
Audrina bumps into old flame Justin Bobby while Ryan's on tour and Kristin embarks on a 'manhunt' to try to get over Brody.
97	7	"The Company You Keep"	June 8, 2010	607-30	1.922
Brody and Kristin use McKaela's friendship with conniving Allie Lutz to push her out of Brody's life.
98	8	"Between a Rocker and a Hard Place"	June 15, 2010	608-30	N/A
Audrina's relationship with Ryan is put to the test when he meets Justin for the first time. Brody sides with Kristin when Allie picks a fight with her.
99	9	"Break-up to Make-up"	June 22, 2010	609-30	N/A
It's Audrina's birthday and the gang, including Justin, board a boat at Marina Del Ray to celebrate. Elsewhere, Kristin has another run in with Allie at a club where a fight erupts. Also Audrina breaks up with Ryan and Kristin laughs at McKaela's pain.
100	10	"Welcome to the Jungle"	June 29, 2010	610-30	1.803
In the 100th episode, the gang travels to Costa Rica, where drama ensues between Brody and Kristin. Kristin meets a bartender named Will, and sparks fly. Stephanie deals with the "joys" of nature. Justin pursues Audrina, who does not give in. Note: Lo does not appear in this episode.
101	11	"Loves Me Not"	July 6, 2010	611-30	1.975
Heidi's mom returns, as she and Holly try to deal with the loss of Heidi in their lives. Stephanie meets a new man, while Kristin makes a big move for Brody, but it seems she is too late. Note: Audrina does not appear in this episode.
102	12	"All Good Things..."	July 13, 2010	612-30	2.95
In the series finale, Kristin must decide if she's going to make a major change in her life, which may force Brody to make a decision about their relationship. Audrina chooses a new, independent life without Justin, but will that be the right choice? Lo weighs whether or not to take the next step with her boyfriend, and Stephanie, for the first time, believes that she's found true happiness. Note: In the final scene, Brody sees Kristin off to Europe. As he looks on as she rides away, the Hollywood Hills backdrop is removed, revealing the lights and cameras. After Kristin's limo turns around and the director says "it's a wrap", the camera pans from a film studio in California. Thus, the series confronts the common question of whether certain elements of the show, or the entire show itself, are real, fake, or a combination of both. Lauren later revealed that she and Brody had filmed an alternate ending to the series. In 2011, the finale was ranked #21 on the TV Guide Network special, TV's Most Unforgettable Finales.

== Aftershow ==
At the beginning of the season, there was much speculation that original cast member Lauren Conrad (who left the series after Season 5, Part 1) would make an appearance for the last season. Despite the crew's effort to persuade her to appear, Conrad confirmed that she would not be appearing on the series, saying, "I really liked how I got to leave the show. I felt like it was on a positive note and I feel like they wrapped up my storyline."

However, MTV later announced that the entire The Hills cast from the beginning would reunite on a one-hour live special, The Hills Live: A Hollywood Ending. The event followed the series' finale and its spin-off show The City's series finale. Despite being advertised that the whole cast would appear on the special, Heidi Montag did not appear on the special.
