= Something Old, Something New (The Hills) =

- The Hills episode
- Lauren (left) reconciles with Heidi (right) before her wedding.
- Episode no.: Season 5 Episode 10
- Narrated by: Lauren Conrad
- Cinematography by: Rachel Morrison
- Production code: 510-60
- Original air date: May 31, 2009
- Running time: 42 minutes (without commercials)

Guest appearance
- Kristin Cavallari

Episode chronology
← Previous "Hi Lauren, It's Spencer..."	Next → "It's On Bitch"
- The Hills (season 5)

"Something Old, Something New" is the tenth episode of the fifth season of The Hills. It originally aired on MTV on May 31, 2009. In the episode, Heidi Montag and Spencer Pratt prepare for their upcoming wedding, while Lauren Conrad and Lo Bosworth move out of their house. After much deliberation, Conrad decides to attend the nuptials, where she reconciles with Montag after being estranged with one another since the third season. It is the final episode in which Conrad appears, and also marks the entrance of her replacement Kristin Cavallari.

"Something Old, Something New" was produced by Adam DiVello, Liz Gateley, Kristofer Lindquist, Sara Mast, and Sean Travis. After the season was retroactively divided into Part I and Part II, respectively separating installments featuring Conrad and Cavallari, the episode became the conclusion of Part I. Additionally, it is the second episode in the series' history with a one-hour running time, the first being "Paris Changes Everything" in the third season.

"Something Old, Something New" was met with generally mixed reviews from critics, who felt that Cavallari's introduction overshadowed Conrad's departure. According to Nielsen ratings, it was watched by 2.7 million viewers in its original airing. The episode was released on DVD on October 6, 2009, packaged with the remainder of Part I of the fifth season.

== Plot ==
Lauren and Lo decide to host a farewell party as they prepare to move out of their house. As wedding preparations continue, Stephanie becomes upset after learning that Heidi has chosen her sister Holly as her maid-of-honor. During the bridal shower, Stephanie assumes the responsibilities after she becomes increasingly displeased with Holly's poor performance. After she makes amends with Spencer, Darlene gives him her blessing for the nuptials. While out for dinner, Brody tries to convince Lauren to attend the wedding, knowing that Heidi would appreciate her presence. In a later outing, Spencer tells Brody of his couples' therapy sessions with Heidi, but is displeased that he is not taken seriously. At the fashion public relations firm People's Revolution, Lauren tells Kelly that she will be leaving the company, which Kelly advocates as a smart decision that will help her to determine her next career endeavors.

As an intoxicated Holly displays erratic behavior at Heidi and Spencer's rehearsal dinner, Stephanie is dismayed by her lack of responsibility. After Spencer explains that her behavior was inappropriate, Holly tearfully leaves the restaurant. The next morning, she apologizes to Heidi for her actions, and confirms that an invitation has been sent to a special guest. Charlie later tells Spencer that he invited Stacie, the bartender that Heidi clashed with for flirting with Spencer, to the wedding. Meanwhile, Brody and Stephanie make peace at Lauren and Lo's farewell party, while Lauren tells Stephanie that she will not be attending the ceremony.

The following morning, the day of the wedding, Heidi and Spencer are getting ready, while guests begin entering the church. Lauren surprises Heidi in her dressing room and explains that Heidi's happiness is important to her. Meanwhile, Kristin Cavallari unexpectedly walks into the church and sits next to Justin, to the surprise of the attendees. After leaving Heidi, Lauren appears displeased after Lo tells her that Kristin is seated across from them. After the wedding has finished, Kristin tells Lo that she needs help finding a boyfriend, and to Audrina's disapproval, adds that Justin seems to be a "stand up guy". Lauren makes her final appearance on the series quietly leaving the church, while Kristin catches Heidi's bouquet.

== Production ==
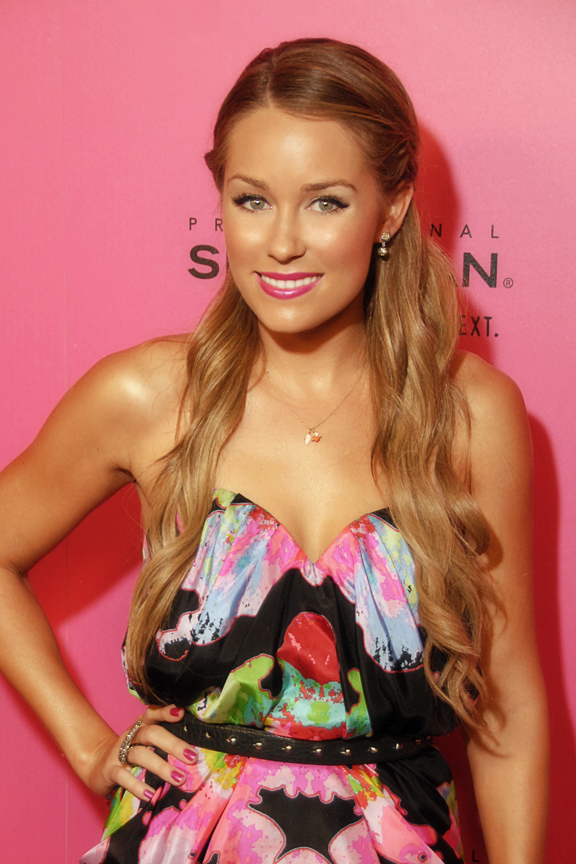
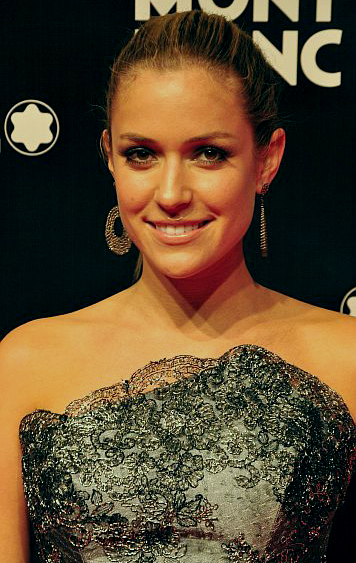
"Something Old, Something New" marked the departure of Lauren Conrad (left) and the introduction of Kristin Cavallari (right).

"Something Old, Something New" was produced by Adam Divello, Liz Gateley, Kristofer Lindquist, Sara Mast, and Sean Travis. The episode became the second in the series' history with a one-hour running time, preceded by "Paris Changes Everything" in the third season. Despite presenting Conrad and Bosworth's house departure as taking place the evening prior to Montag and Pratt's nuptials, the former event was filmed in January 2009, while the latter took place on April 25, 2009.

Conrad first indicated that she wished to leave The Hills upon the conclusion of its fourth season in December 2008, looking to pursue other career opportunities. She commented that "five years on TV is a really, really long time", adding that she was "ready to walk away". However, per the producers' requests, Conrad filmed ten episodes for the fifth season, in which she closed her storylines. She added that the season was potentially its last, stating that series personnel felt her presence would "give the show some sort of closure". In the July 2009 issue of Cosmopolitan, Conrad stated that producers had pressured her into a reconciliation with Montag throughout the season, adding that she was displeased when they would not allow otherwise.

"Something Old, Something New" was initially billed as the fifth-season finale. However, in April 2009, MTV announced an extension of the season, and confirmed Cavallari as Conrad's replacement the following month. Consequentially, the first ten episodes of the season were retroactively labeled Part I, while Cavallari's forthcoming episodes were titled Part II.

== Reception and release ==
"Something Old, Something New" was met with generally mixed reviews from critics, many of whom were ambivalent towards Conrad's departure and Cavallari's introduction. Emma Rosenblum from New York was pleased with Conrad's exit, commenting that she was emotional watching her "moving on and distancing herself from the follies of her overexposed youth". However, she opined that Cavallari's appearance at the wedding "does not bode well for the future of The Hills". A writer for Entertainment Weekly described the reconciliation between Conrad and Montag an "ideal end" to the series, and noted Cavallari's addition as a "questionable choice". Furthermore, it was included on the magazine's list of "25 TV Shows That Missed Cue for a Graceful Exit". In contrast, Jim Cantiello of MTV News noted that Conrad "came to the realization that she had been replaced", and complimented the manner in which Cavallari was integrated into the series. Carrie Bell from People was pleased that "the bitch [Cavallari] is back and [she could] already tell it’s going to make for some great trashy TV".

In its original broadcast in the United States on May 31, 2009, "Something Old, Something New" was watched by 2.7 million viewers. It experienced a 10-percent ratings drop from the season premiere "Don't Cry on Your Birthday", which garnered 3 million viewers on April 6, 2009. In the country, Season 5, Part I was released as a two-disc DVD set on October 6, 2009.
