= Very Cavallari =

2018 American reality television series

- Genre: Reality television
- Starring: Kristin Cavallari; Jay Cutler; Kelly Henderson; Brittainy Taylor; Reagan Agee; Colby Dee Coskery; Wirth Campbell
- Country of origin: United States
- Original language: English
- No. of seasons: 3
- No. of episodes: 30

Production
- Production locations: Nashville, Tennessee
- Camera setup: Multiple
- Running time: 39–46 minutes

Original release
- Network: E!
- Release: July 8, 2018 – March 19, 2020

Related
- Laguna Beach: The Real Orange County; The Hills

Very Cavallari is an American reality television series that premiered on July 8, 2018, on E!. The series follows Kristin Cavallari and her life in Nashville, Tennessee, with her then-husband Jay Cutler, as she launches the flagship store for her jewelry line, Uncommon James.

== Production ==
Very Cavallari was announced in April 2018. The series is set in Nashville, Tennessee. The series premiered on July 8, 2018. On August 23, 2018, it was announced that Very Cavallari was renewed for a 10-episode second season. On May 3, 2019, the series was renewed for a third season that premiered on January 9, 2020. On November 4, 2019, it was announced that a holiday special titled A Very Merry Cavallari would premiere on December 15, 2019.

On May 19, 2020, Cavallari announced that she would not continue doing the show, effectively ending it after three seasons.

== Cast ==
- Kristin Cavallari
- Jay Cutler
- Kelly Henderson (seasons 1–2; guest, season 3)
- Brittainy Taylor
- Reagan Agee (seasons 1–2)
- Justin Anderson
- Austin Rhodes
- Colby Dee Coskery
- Wirth Campbell
- Shannon Ford (seasons 1–2)
- John Gurney (seasons 1–2)
- Taylor Long Monaco (seasons 1–2)

== Episodes ==
=== Series overview ===
Season	Episodes	Originally released	
Season	Episodes	First released	Last released
1	8	July 8, 2018	August 26, 2018
2	10	March 3, 2019	May 12, 2019
3	11	December 15, 2019	March 19, 2020

=== Season 1 (2018) ===
No. overall	No. in season	Title	Original release date	U.S. viewers (millions)
1	1	"I'm CEO, Bitch"	July 8, 2018	0.35
2	2	"Sunday Not So Funday"	July 15, 2018	0.40
3	3	"Boss Moves"	July 22, 2018	0.38
4	4	"The Ginger Snaps"	July 29, 2018	0.42
5	5	"Back to the Hills"	August 5, 2018	0.61
6	6	"Beach, Please"	August 12, 2018	0.51
7	7	"New York State of Mind"	August 19, 2018	0.52
8	8	"Ready, Set, Launch"	August 26, 2018	0.53

=== Season 2 (2019) ===
No. overall	No. in season	Title	Original release date	U.S. viewers (millions)
9	1	"Don't Want No Llama Drama"	March 3, 2019	0.41
10	2	"Shake Ya Palm Palms"	March 10, 2019	0.34
11	3	"Bring Your Jay to Work Day"	March 17, 2019	0.40
12	4	"You Can't Ship With Us"	March 24, 2019	0.35
13	5	"Pass the Popcorn"	March 31, 2019	0.55
14	6	"The One Where Jay Goes Crazy"	April 7, 2019	0.54
15	7	"Best Frenemies Forever"	April 21, 2019	0.38
16	8	"Cabo, Here We Come!"	April 28, 2019	0.52
17	9	"Beaches Gone Wild"	May 5, 2019	0.35
18	10	"Nothing's Set in Stone"	May 12, 2019	0.38

=== Season 3 (2019–20) ===
No. overall	No. in season	Title	Original release date	U.S. viewers (millions)
19	–	"A Very Merry Cavallari"	December 15, 2019	0.38
20	1	"Uncommon Beginnings"	January 9, 2020	0.34
21	2	"Out With the Old"	January 16, 2020	0.32
22	3	"Crystal Clear"	January 23, 2020	0.39
23	4	"Home Wasn't Built in a Day"	January 30, 2020	0.34
24	5	"Work Life Balance"	February 6, 2020	0.32
25	6	"Just Like The Old Days"	February 13, 2020	0.33
26	7	"Red Carpet Ready"	February 20, 2020	0.35
27	8	"Roughing It"	February 27, 2020	0.27
28	9	"Ciao Bella!"	March 5, 2020	0.34
29	10	"Read Between the Wines"	March 12, 2020	0.38
30	11	"New Store, New Chapters"	March 19, 2020	0.39
