= Jay Cutler =

American football player (born 1983)

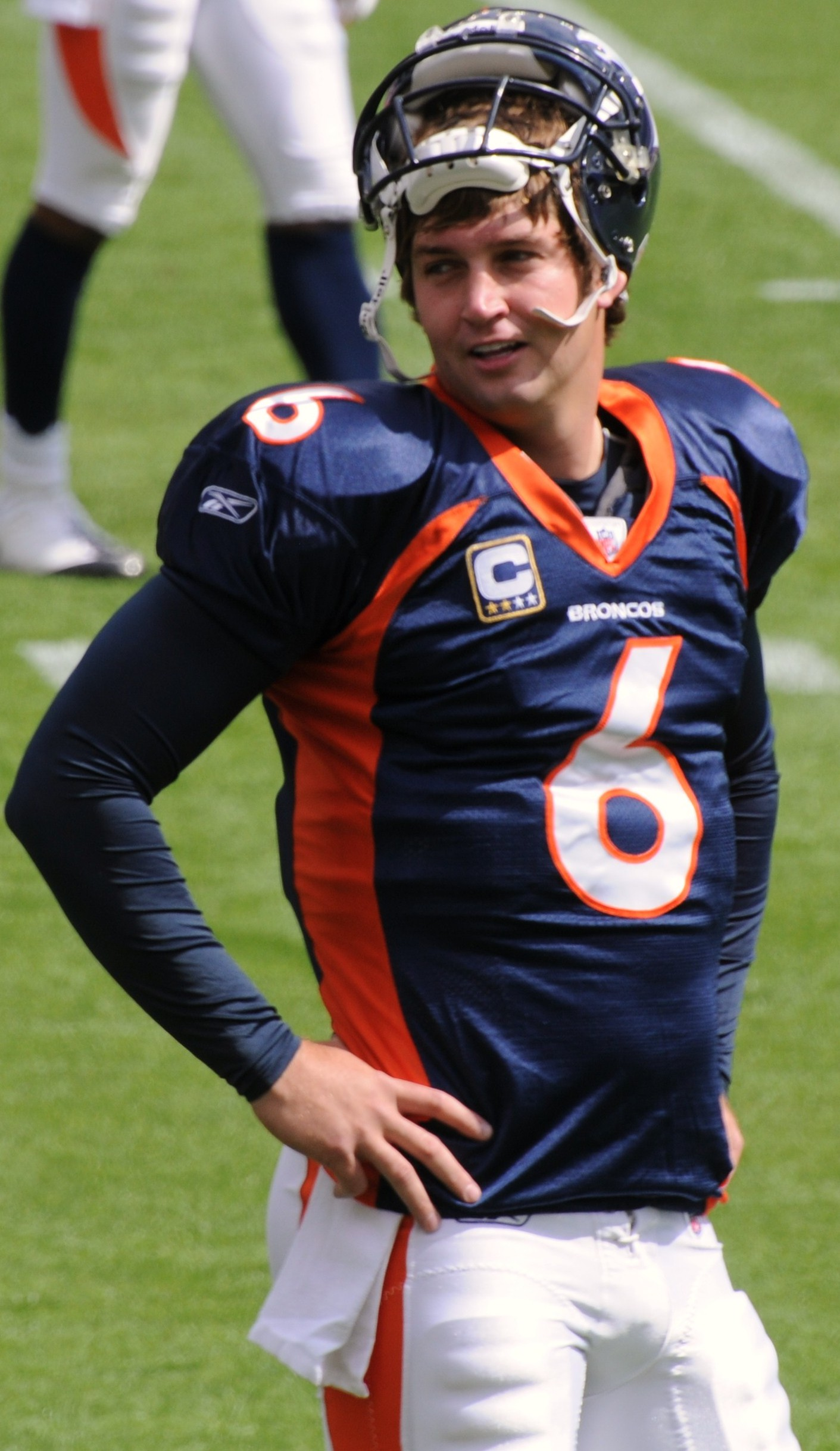
- Cutler with the Denver Broncos in 2008

No. 6
- Position: Quarterback

Personal information
- Born: April 29, 1983 (age 43); Santa Claus, Indiana, U.S.
- Listed height: 6 ft 3 in (1.91 m)
- Listed weight: 231 lb (105 kg)

Career information
- High school: Heritage Hills (Lincoln City, Indiana)
- College: Vanderbilt (2001–2005)
- NFL draft: 2006: 1st round, 11th overall pick

Career history
- Denver Broncos (2006–2008); Chicago Bears (2009–2016); Miami Dolphins (2017)

Awards and highlights
- Pro Bowl (2008); 100 greatest Bears of all-time; SEC Offensive Player of the Year (2005); First-team All-SEC (2005)

Career NFL statistics
- Passing attempts: 4,920
- Passing completions: 3,048
- Completion percentage: 62.0%
- TD–INT: 227–160
- Passing yards: 35,133
- Passer rating: 85.3
- Stats at Pro Football Reference

Jay Christopher Cutler (born April 29, 1983) is an American former professional football quarterback who played in the National Football League (NFL) for 12 seasons. A member of the Chicago Bears for most of his career, he is the franchise leader in passing yards, passing touchdowns, attempts, and completions.

Cutler played college football for the Vanderbilt Commodores, winning SEC Offensive Player of the Year in 2005. He was selected by the Denver Broncos in the first round of the 2006 NFL draft. During his three seasons with the Broncos, he earned Pro Bowl honors in 2008. The following year, Cutler was traded to the Bears, where he played eight seasons. His most successful season was in 2010 when he led the Bears to a division title and NFC Championship Game appearance. After being released by Chicago, Cutler spent his final year with the Miami Dolphins. He was named among the 100 greatest Bears of all-time in 2019.

== Early life ==
Cutler was born in Santa Claus, Indiana, in 1983. Cutler attended Heritage Hills High School in Lincoln City, Indiana. He started three years as a quarterback for the Patriots football team, amassing a combined 26–1 record in his junior and senior years, including a perfect 15–0 during his senior year. Cutler and his team outscored opponents 746–85, including a 90–0 shutout at Pike Central. During his senior year, Cutler connected on 122 of 202 passes (60.4%) for 2,252 yards with 31 touchdowns, while rushing 65 times for 493 yards with 11 touchdowns. He also started at safety for three years, intercepting nine passes as a senior, 12th overall in the state. His team's perfect record during his senior year included the school's first 3A state championship, where Heritage Hills beat Zionsville in overtime, 27–24. The most notable play of the game occurred when Cutler lateraled the ball to the halfback, Cole Seifrig, who then passed it to Cutler who ran it into the end zone. Cutler also played strong safety in the state championship and made 19 tackles.

Cutler was named a first-team All-State selection by the Associated Press as a senior. In addition to playing football in high school, he was a first-team all-state selection in basketball, scoring 1,131 points; he co-holds the school record for FGs made (16) in a game and garnered honorable mention all-state accolades as a shortstop in baseball.

Cutler grew up as a Chicago Bears fan during his youth in Indiana.

== College career ==
Cutler attended Vanderbilt University in Nashville, Tennessee. He redshirted in his 2001 freshman season and subsequently started all 45 career games that he played for the Commodores, the most starts by a quarterback in school history. He did not miss a game in college due to injury. The Commodores were 11–34 during his tenure, including going 5–27 versus the SEC. In 2002, Cutler set the school record for touchdowns and rushing yards by a freshman and rushed for more yards than any other Southeastern Conference quarterback that year. The Associated Press honored him with a first team freshman All-SEC selection. In 2004, as a junior, Cutler completed 61.0 percent of his passes, setting a school record, while throwing for 1,844 yards with 10 touchdowns and a career-low five interceptions.

The 2005 season, Cutler's final year of play at Vanderbilt, was his most successful. As an 11-game starter, he completed 273 of 462 passes (59.1%) for 3,073 yards and threw 21 touchdowns and nine interceptions, as he became the first Commodore to win the SEC Offensive Player of the Year (coaches and media) since 1967. With his senior-season performance, Cutler became the second Commodore to throw for more than 3,000 yards in a season, while his 273 completions and 21 touchdowns ranked second on the school's single-season list. He led the Commodores to victories over Wake Forest, Arkansas, Ole Miss, Richmond and Tennessee. The Commodores also scored the second most points ever (42) laid upon the Florida Gators at their current home field at Ben Hill Griffin Stadium. Vanderbilt nearly upset the 13th-ranked Gators before falling 49–42 in the second overtime after a controversial excessive celebration call prevented the Commodores from going for 2 at the end of regulation. Reflecting on Cutler's college career, former Denver Broncos safety John Lynch said, "If this guy can take a bunch of future doctors and lawyers and have them competing against the Florida Gators, this guy is a stud."

Cutler ended his career by leading Vanderbilt past Tennessee, 28–24, their first over the Volunteers since 1982 (the year before Cutler was born) and the first in Knoxville since 1975. Cutler passed for three touchdowns and 315 yards, becoming the first quarterback in school history to record four consecutive 300-yard passing performances. Cutler's final play in college was the game-winning and streak-ending touchdown pass to teammate Earl Bennett against Tennessee. A finalist for the Johnny Unitas Golden Arm Award (nation's top senior quarterback), Cutler was a first-team All-SEC pick by the league's coaches and led the conference with a school-record 3,288 yards of total offense.

While at Vanderbilt, Cutler was a three-year captain and four-year starter, setting school career records for total offense (9,953 yards), touchdown passes (59), passing yards (8,697), pass completions (710), pass attempts (1,242), and combined touchdowns (76).

Cutler graduated from Vanderbilt in 2005 with a bachelor's degree in human and organizational development. In 2016, Cutler was inducted into the Vanderbilt Athletics Hall of Fame.

== Professional career ==
=== Pre-draft ===
Pre-draft measurables
| Height | Weight | Arm length | Hand span | 40-yard dash | 10-yard split | 20-yard split | 20-yard shuttle | Three-cone drill | Bench press | Wonderlic |
|---|---|---|---|---|---|---|---|---|---|---|
| 6 ft 3 1/4 in (1.91 m) | 226 lb (103 kg) | 31 1/2 in (0.80 m) | 9 3/8 in (0.24 m) | 4.77 s | 1.62 s | 2.78 s | 4.26 s | 7.10 s | 23 reps | 26 |
All values from NFL Combine

Cutler was ranked by many experts as the third-best quarterback prospect in the 2006 NFL draft after Matt Leinart of USC and Vince Young of Texas. ESPN's Chris Mortensen and Ron Jaworski tabbed him as the best quarterback available in the draft, and some scouts believed he had better arm strength than Young and Leinart comparing him to Brett Favre for his gunslinger attitude. At the 2006 NFL Scouting Combine, Cutler completed 23 repetitions of a 225-pound bench press (more than some linemen) and ran a 40-yard dash in 4.77 seconds.

=== Denver Broncos ===
==== 2006 season ====
Cutler was selected, with the 11th pick of the first round of the draft by the Denver Broncos, who traded their 1st- and 3rd-round picks to the St. Louis Rams to move up. Many believed Cutler was chosen by the Broncos due to the lackluster performance in the previous season's AFC Championship Game of Jake Plummer. After the pick by Denver, Cutler said, "We had no warning. I think I knew about 15 seconds before everyone else did." Cutler, as predicted by most, was the third quarterback chosen, after Young (3rd overall) and Leinart (10th). He is the third first-round pick to come from Vanderbilt, preceded by Will Wolford and Bill Wade. On July 27, 2006, Cutler agreed to terms on a six-year $48 million contract, which included $11 million in bonuses.

After a strong training camp in 2006, Cutler was promoted from third to second on the Broncos' quarterback depth chart ahead of Bradlee Van Pelt. He passed for more yards than any other rookie in the preseason.

On November 27, head coach Mike Shanahan officially announced that Cutler would replace Jake Plummer as starting quarterback despite a 7–4 record because, "I think he gives us the best chance to win now." The controversial decision capped weeks of speculation and rumors about Cutler's impending promotion to a starting role.

Cutler took his first NFL snap on December 3 (Week 13), and, after some initial jitters (0–3 with a sack and fumble), completed his first touchdown to tight end Stephen Alexander in the second quarter. In the fourth quarter, he threw a memorable 71-yard touchdown to fellow-rookie Brandon Marshall to tie the game 20–20. It was one of the longest touchdown passes for a debut in NFL history and was also the second-longest pass play between two rookies in Broncos history. He also had two interceptions and took three sacks in the loss.

On December 10, in a road loss against the San Diego Chargers, Cutler connected with tight end Tony Scheffler for two touchdowns in a span of 48 seconds, which is tied for fastest in league history that two rookies produced a pair of scoring passes.

Cutler's first win came in his third start on December 17, which was a 37–20 road victory over the Arizona Cardinals. He finished the game 21-of-31 with 261 yards, two touchdowns, an interception, and a QB rating of 101.7, the highest for a Broncos' rookie since John Elway in 1983. One touchdown traveled 65 yards in the air, and was recorded as a 54-yard touchdown to Javon Walker on the Broncos' third play of the game. Shanahan said to the media, "You saw what he could do today. It doesn't take a genius out there to figure out this guy is very composed, can make all the throws and plays with a lot of confidence."

Cutler then led the Broncos to a Christmas Eve win over the Cincinnati Bengals, 24–23, in his fourth start on the season. He went 12-of-23 with 179 yards, two touchdowns and one interception. He also directed the Broncos on a 99-yard drive in the third quarter that culminated on a Mike Bell two-yard touchdown run. As a result of the two passing touchdowns in the game against the Bengals, Cutler became the first rookie QB in NFL history to throw for at least two touchdowns in each of his first four games played. He also became the second rookie in league history (fifth player overall) to throw at least two touchdown passes in each of his first four starts.

The Broncos' quest to clinch a playoff berth came up short in the final game of the season when they fell at home, 26–23, in overtime to the San Francisco 49ers. The loss dropped the Broncos to 9–7 overall and 4–4 at home. Despite sustaining a concussion in the first half, Cutler finished 21 of 32 with 230 yards and a touchdown and led Denver on a game-tying touchdown drive in the closing minutes of regulation to force overtime.

In five games, Cutler finished with a record of 2–3 and went 81-of-137 for 1,001 yards, nine touchdowns, and five interceptions, earning a franchise rookie record passer rating of 88.5. He posted the second-highest touchdown percentage (6.6) and third-highest TD-to-INT ratio (1.8) among NFL rookies since 1970 with at least 125 passing attempts.

==== 2007 season ====
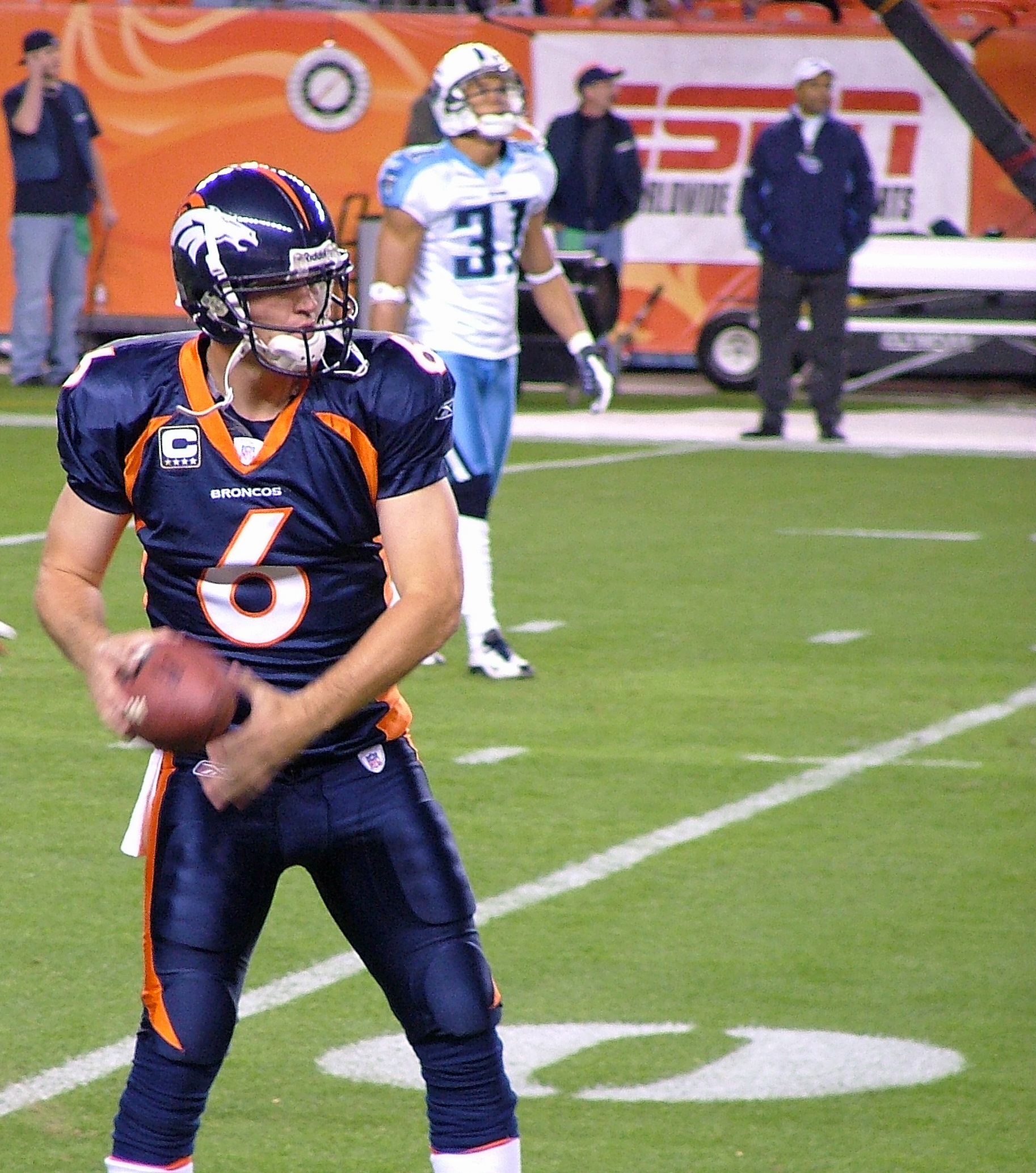
Cutler preparing for the Titans in a 2007 MNF game.

The 2007 NFL season marked Cutler's first full season as the starting quarterback for the Broncos. In the first game of the season against the Buffalo Bills, Cutler led Denver to a comeback win on a 12-play, 42-yard drive culminating in a Jason Elam 42-yard field goal as time expired. Cutler's pass attempts (39), completions (23), and yards (304) for the game were career-highs at the time. He led Denver to their second straight comeback win the next week in the home opener against the Oakland Raiders. Late in regulation, Cutler moved the team 78 yards in 15 plays for the game-tying field goal with 2:18 remaining. The game went into overtime, where he engineered a 52-yard drive that led to another game-winning field goal by Elam. Cutler had a touchdown pass during the game, making him the first Broncos passer to begin his Broncos career with at least one touchdown pass in his first seven starts. The streak reached nine games through losses to Jacksonville and Indianapolis (which featured his first career rushing touchdown), but ended with a 41–3 home loss to the San Diego Chargers in the fifth game of the season.

After the bye week in Week 6, the 2-3 Broncos beat the 4–1 Pittsburgh Steelers, 31–28. Cutler had a passer rating of 106.7 and career highs of 75.9% passes completed, three touchdown passes, 41 rushing yards (including a long run of 31 yards), earning NBC Sunday Night Football's Horse Trailer Player of the Game (with Elam). Cutler finally had an interception-free game in his 12th start against the 6–1 Green Bay Packers, in which he drove 89-yards for a game-tying field goal in the last 2:27 of regulation, before losing in overtime, 19–13, on Green Bay's first play from scrimmage. In week 8, Cutler had just four attempts against the Detroit Lions before leaving with a leg injury; backup Patrick Ramsey floundered in a 44–7 loss. Cutler returned the next week in a 27–11 victory at Kansas City.

In Week 10, the 4–5 Broncos faced the 6–3 Tennessee Titans (and fellow 2006 draftee Vince Young for the first time) on Monday Night Football. Cutler posted a career-second-best 137.0 passer rating in a 34–20 victory. He was the first Broncos quarterback since Elway in 1995 to throw two 40+ yard touchdowns in a game (of the team's franchise-record four 40+ yard touchdowns that night), and the 5–5 Broncos moved into a tie with San Diego atop the AFC West. However, the Broncos won only one of the next five games, a 41–7 Chiefs blowout. In that game, Cutler passed for four touchdowns and a then-career-best rating of 141.0. But that bright spot came between two pairs of losses; in the four games Cutler had five interceptions, took 12 sacks, twice had a rating under 50.0, and culminated in 23–3 loss to San Diego that eliminated the Broncos from the playoffs. Cutler salvaged a 7–9 record with a 22–19 overtime win over Minnesota, eliminating them as well.

Denver missed the playoffs for a second straight year. Cutler started all 16 games, completing 297-of-467 passes (63.6%) for 3,497 yards, 20 touchdowns and 14 interceptions. He was the NFL's 12th-ranked passer (88.1) and also had the tenth-most passing yards (3,497). Furthermore, Cutler was the league's ninth-best third-down passer, with a 92.1 passer rating (73-of-125 for 901 yards, eight touchdowns, and three interceptions). It was the seventh most passing yards in Broncos history, and third-best completion percentage. Like his predecessor Plummer, Cutler showed mobility with 44 rushes for 205 yards (4.7 yards per carry) and a touchdown on the season.

In late 2007, various experts suggested Cutler was the young quarterback most likely to reach the elite status along the lines of Peyton Manning and Tom Brady. Cutler, Brandon Marshall, and Tony Scheffler went to Atlanta together to train and work on timing for the 2008 season.

==== 2008 season ====
Before the 2008 regular season began, Cutler and tight end Daniel Graham were voted offensive captains by Broncos teammates.

Cutler started the season with a 41–14 Monday Night Football victory over Oakland. He completed 16-of-24 passes for 300 yards and two touchdowns, The next week, Cutler and the Broncos defeated the Chargers in Denver, 39–38. Cutler went 36-of-50, with 350 yards passing and a career-best-tying four touchdowns, including one to Eddie Royal on 4th and Goal with 0:24 left, followed by a game-winning two-point conversion again to Royal. This occurred one play after Cutler fumbled, but an inadvertent whistle by referee Ed Hochuli before the Chargers recovered gave the Broncos the ball back. In Week 3, Cutler had 264 yards and two touchdowns in a 34–22 home win over New Orleans. Cutler threw two interceptions for the first time in the Broncos' first defeat, 33–19 at Kansas City. Despite this, he finished September first in the AFC in completions (102), passing yards (1,275), and attempts (157), second in yards per attempt (8.12), third in passing touchdowns (9) and quarterback rating (98.6), and fifth in completion percentage (65.0%), winning AFC Offensive Player of the Month honors for the first time in his career.

The Broncos edged out Tampa Bay 16–13 behind Cutler's 23-of-34 performance with 227 yards, one touchdown and no interceptions. The Broncos were 4–1 and leading AFC West. But then followed a 24–17 loss to the Jacksonville Jaguars, where Cutler passed for just 192 yards, two touchdowns and one interception. Cutler injured his index finger on the first play of a 41–7 drubbing at New England; he ended the night with 168 yards and two interceptions. After a bye week, the Broncos suffered their third straight defeat, 26–17 to Miami, behind Cutler's 24-of-46 passing for 307 yards, two touchdowns and season-high three interceptions. During the 1–4 skid, Cutler had all seven of the Broncos' touchdowns.

In game 9, the Broncos found themselves down 23–10 at Cleveland, but in the 4th quarter Cutler threw a career-long 93-yard touchdown to Royal followed by touchdown passes to Graham and the game-winner to Marshall with 1:14 left. Cutler finished the game going 24-of-42 with 447 yards (career-high), three touchdowns and one interception, and received AFC Offensive Player of the Week honors for the first time in his career. The next week, Cutler threw another late 4th quarter touchdown to Graham for a 24–20 win at Atlanta.

In game 11, Cutler's streak of games with a touchdown ended at 11 as he went 16-of-37 for 204 yards and an interception in a 31–10 loss to Oakland. He did, however, reach 3,000 yards on the season, tying John Elway by reaching this mark in 11 games. In a windy Game 12 against the New York Jets, Cutler went 27-of-43 with 357 yards, two touchdowns and one interception in the 34–17 victory. The 7–5 Broncos had a three-game road win streak, three-game home loss streak, and three-game lead on San Diego (who had their own three-game losing streak) with four games remaining.

Cutler began December completing a season high 80% of his 40 passes for 286 yards, two touchdowns, and one interception in a 24–17 win over the Chiefs. The win came via a 95-yard drive and go-ahead touchdown pass to Marshall for Cutler's fourth rally of the season. However, Cutler was just 21-of-33 with 172 yards, one touchdown, and one interception in a 30–20 loss to Carolina, and despite 359 yards and 2 rushing touchdowns, had no passing touchdowns and one interception in a 30–23 loss to Buffalo. This set up a winner-takes-the-division season finale against the Chargers. Cutler went 33-of-49 with 316 yards, one touchdown, and two interceptions, but it wasn't enough to counteract the Chargers' seven touchdowns and Denver lost 52–21, failing to reach the playoffs for the third straight season.

Cutler finished the season with career-highs in passing completions (384), passing attempts (616), passing yards (4,526), passing touchdowns (25), interceptions (18), rushing attempts (57) and rushing touchdowns (2). At the time, his passing yards, completions and attempts were all single-season franchise records for the Broncos. He also had the most 300-yard passing games (8) in team history. For the season, Cutler ranked third in the NFL in completions (first in the AFC), second in passing attempts (first in the AFC), third in passing yards (first in the AFC) and seventh in passing touchdowns (third in the AFC). He was selected as the FedEx Air Player of the Week for his performances during Weeks 10, 13 and 14. He finished third in fan voting for AFC quarterbacks in the 2009 Pro Bowl, and was officially selected as a reserve. Before the game in Hawaii, fellow Pro Bowlers Peyton Manning, Nick Mangold, and Kris Dielman threw him into a pool, ruining his blood sugar monitor. A replacement one was found at a drugstore, and Cutler played without incident.

=== Chicago Bears ===
==== 2009 season ====
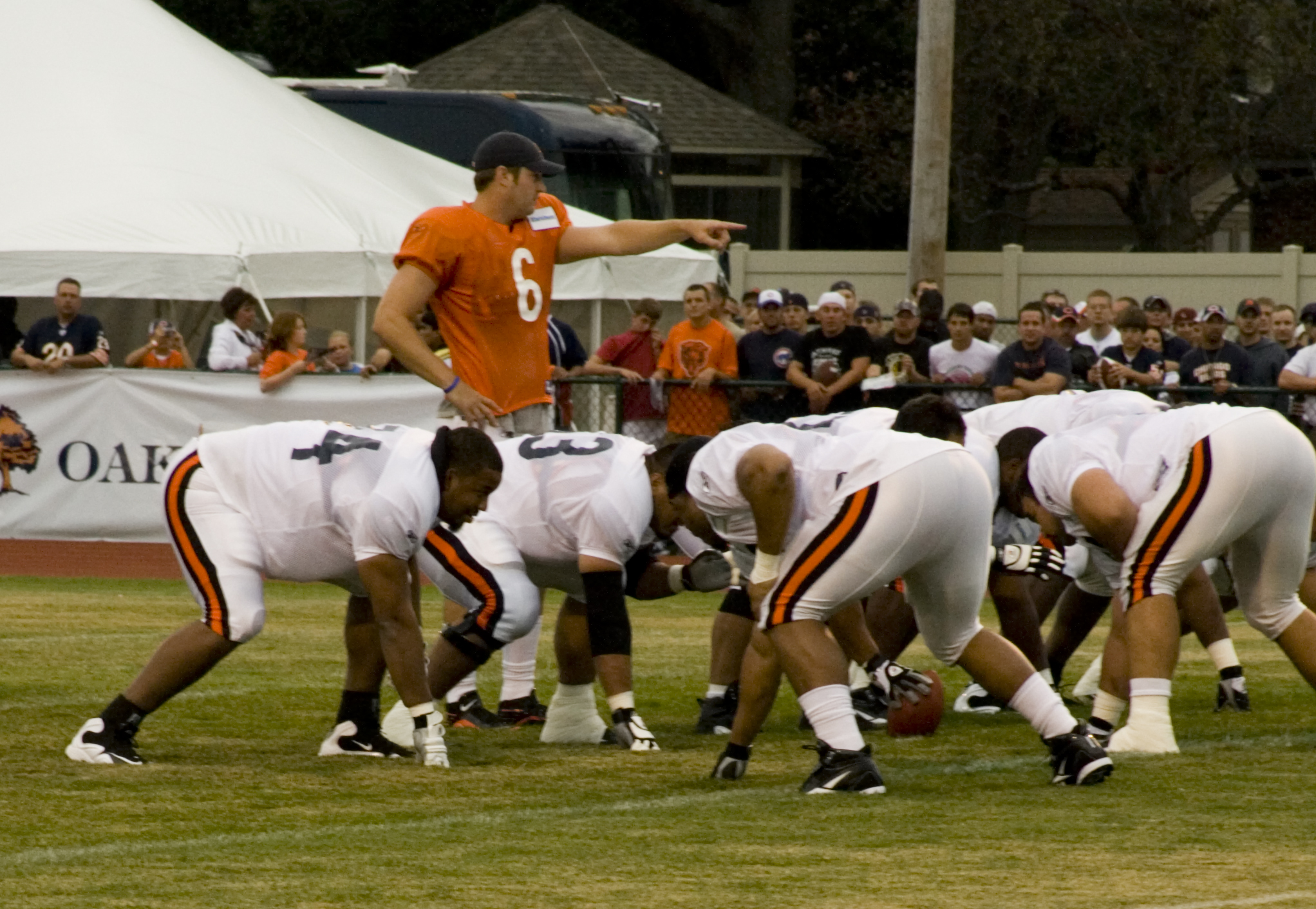
Cutler points out the mike linebacker during training camp, 2009

Despite Cutler making the Pro Bowl, Shanahan was fired after the 2008 season. The Broncos hired New England Patriots offensive coordinator Josh McDaniels as their new head coach, who purged Shanahan's staff in favor of his own assistants. Cutler objected to the firings, particularly of offensive coordinator Jeremy Bates, and claimed Broncos owner Pat Bowlen had assured him the offense would remain intact. Bowlen denied having such a conversation. Rumors eventually surfaced of Cutler potentially being traded in exchange for New England quarterback Matt Cassel, while McDaniels stressed "we are not trading Jay Cutler – period." The tension between Cutler and McDaniels culminated in the former officially requesting a trade.

On April 3, 2009, Cutler was traded with the Broncos' fifth-round selection in the 2009 NFL draft pick to the Chicago Bears for quarterback Kyle Orton, the Bears' first- and third-round selections in 2009, and first-round pick in the 2010 NFL draft. On October 20, Cutler and the Bears came to terms on a two-year contract extension worth $30 million, running through 2013.

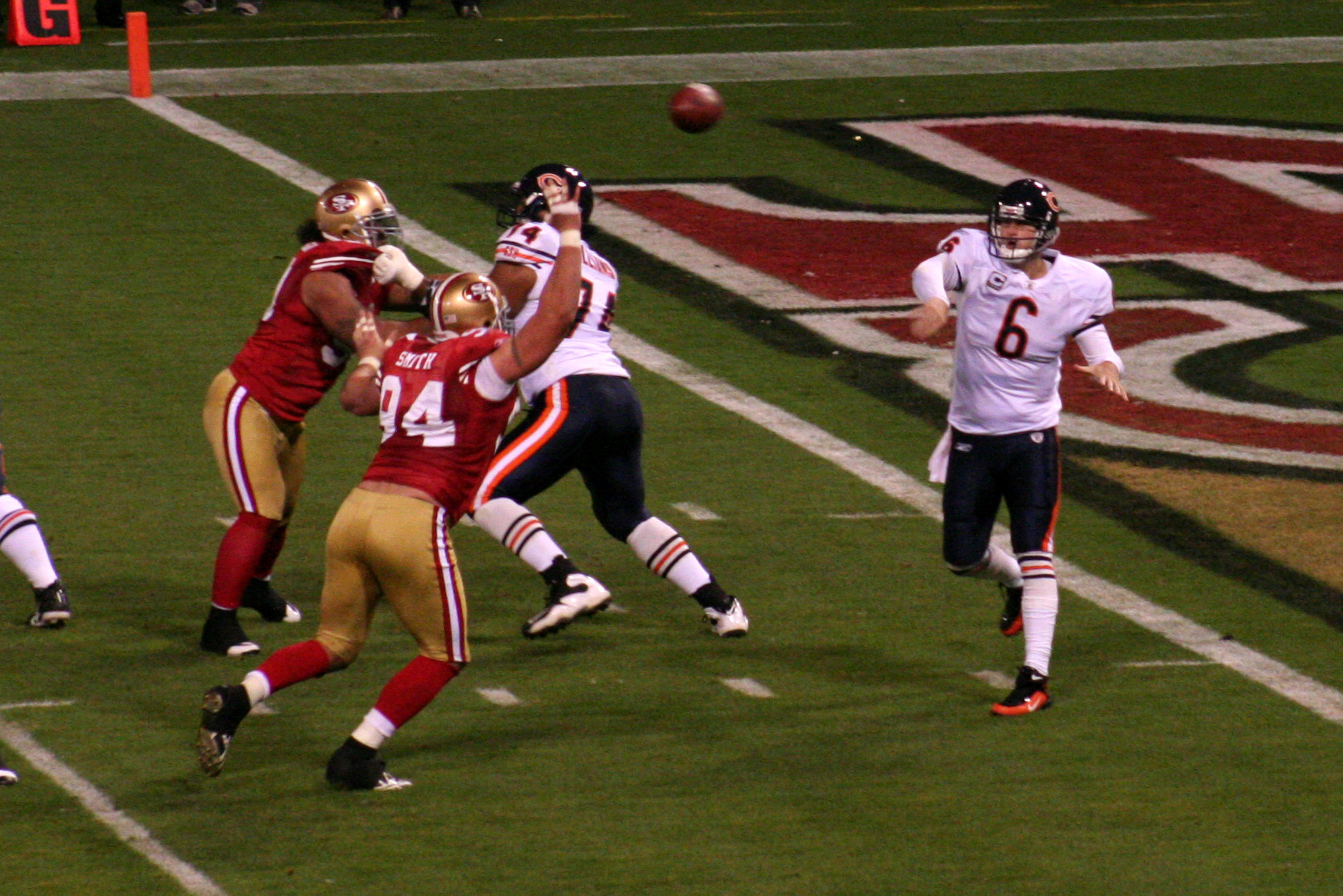
Cutler passes in a game against the San Francisco 49ers in 2009

Cutler was the subject of most of the praise and criticism during the Bears' mercurial season. He began the season with 4 INTs in a loss to Green Bay, followed by seven touchdowns to one interception in three straight wins with a 100+ passer rating. The Bears lost eight of the next ten games behind Cutler's 11 touchdowns vs NFL-leading 20 interceptions. This included a Week 9 loss to San Francisco where Cutler threw a career-high five interceptions and no touchdowns, and a Game 14 loss to Baltimore where Cutler had career-worsts of 94 yards and a passer rating of 7.9. But Cutler again reversed direction in Game 15 against Brett Favre and division rival Minnesota, where he threw four touchdowns, including a go-ahead late in the 4th quarter, and the 31-yard game-winner to Devin Aromashodu in overtime. He earned Offensive Player of the Week for his effort against the Vikings. He then ended the season with another four-touchdown outing and win over Detroit.

Cutler finished the season with 27 touchdowns, league-leading 26 interceptions, 3,666 yards passing, and career-worst passer rating of 76.8.

==== 2010 season ====
The Bears hired Mike Martz, famed for developing the St. Louis Rams' "Greatest Show on Turf", as offensive coordinator ahead of the 2010 season. Though Martz was critical of Cutler as an analyst, both professed excitement about working together.

Cutler led the Bears to a 3–0 start, throwing six touchdowns and only two interceptions. However, in Week 4, Cutler was sacked nine times in the first half against the New York Giants, missing the rest of that game and the next with a concussion. He returned to six sacks in a loss to Seattle and four interceptions—all by DeAngelo Hall—in a loss to Washington, leaving the Bears at 4–3 at their bye week.

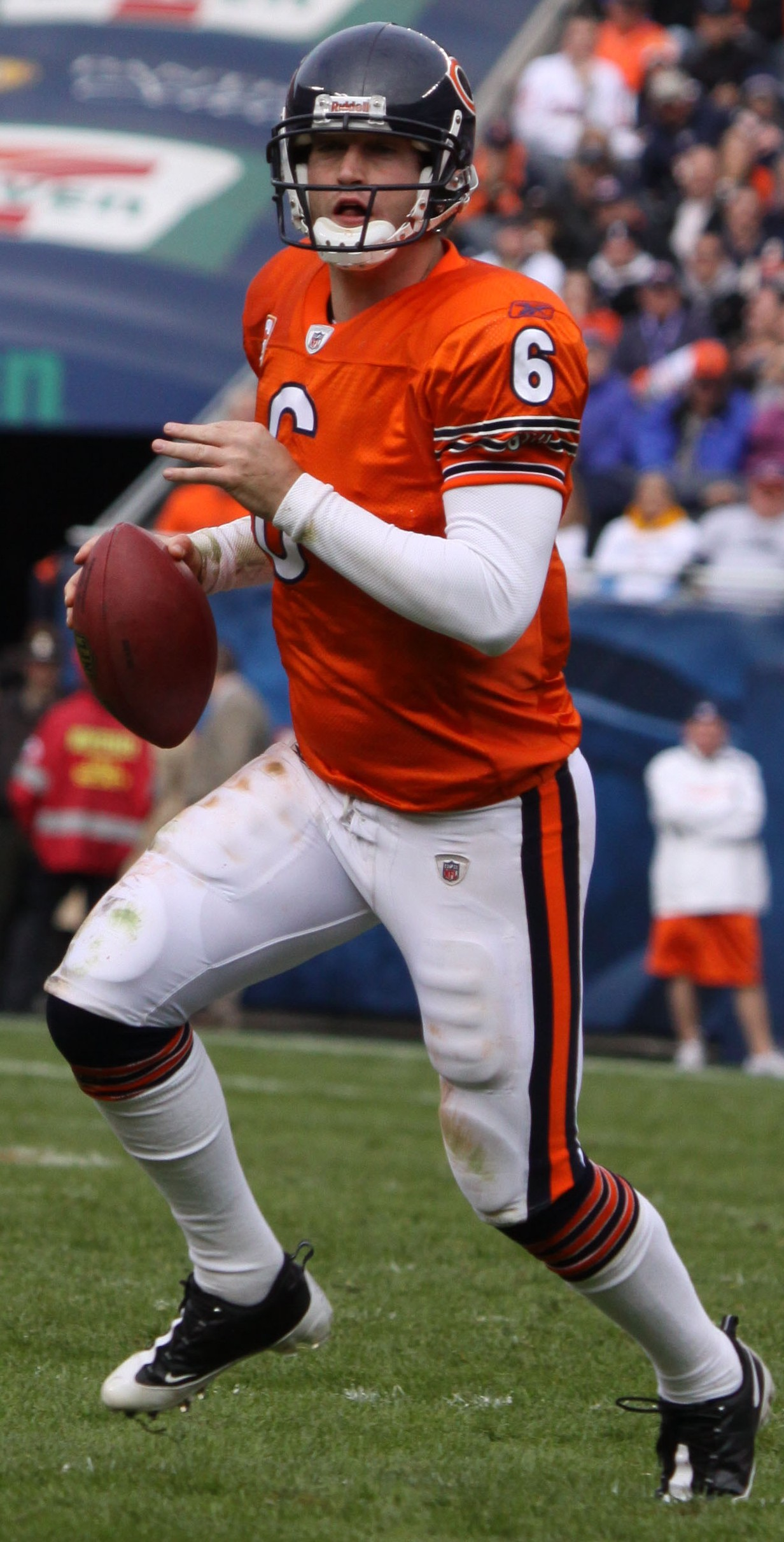
Cutler in 2010

Martz retooled the offensive line and showed more commitment to the running game, allowing Cutler to escape the next three games with just six sacks total. He won those three, followed by then-career-bests of four touchdowns and rating of 146.2 in a win over the 7–3 Eagles (winning NFC Player of the Week), and an 80.8% completion percentage in a win over Detroit. After a 152-yard, no-touchdown, two-interception loss to New England, Cutler won back-to-back games with three touchdowns, one interception, and 100+ ratings in each, before dropping the season finale to Green Bay. The Bears finished with an 11–5 record, the NFC North title, and a first-round bye. Despite taking a league-leading 52 sacks, Cutler finished the season with 3,274 passing yards, 23 touchdowns, 16 interceptions, 232 rushing yards, and 4 comeback victories.

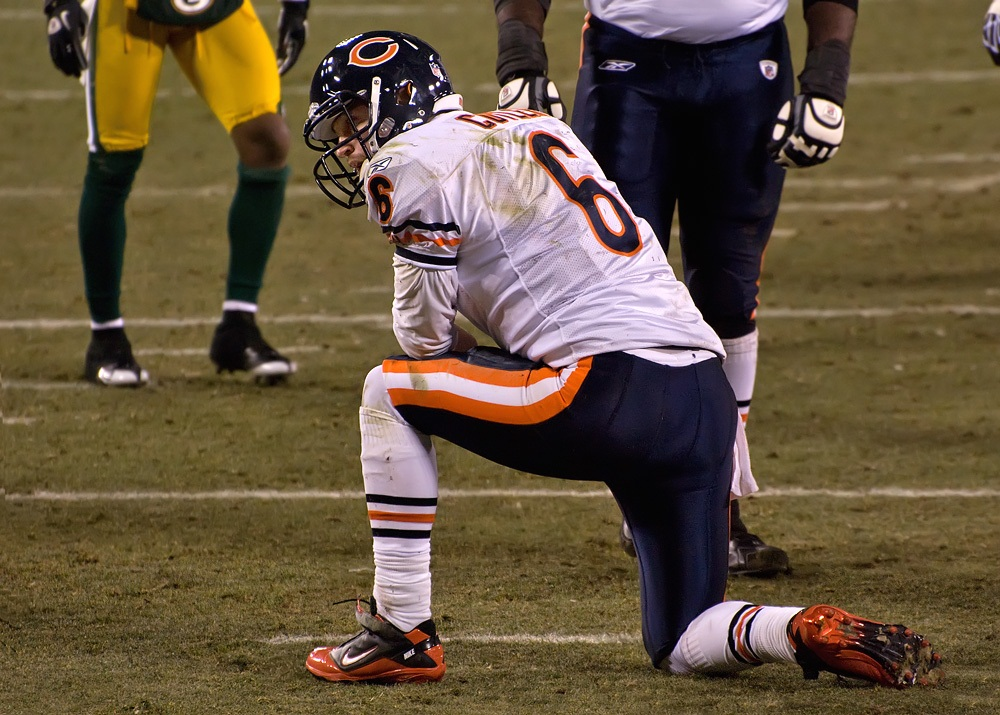
Cutler on January 2, 2011, against the Green Bay Packers.

In Cutler's playoff debut against the Seahawks, he had 274 passing yards, two passing touchdowns, 43 rushing yards, and two rushing touchdowns in the Bears' 35–24 win, making him the second quarterback in NFL history since Otto Graham in 1954 and 1955 to score two touchdown passes and two touchdown runs in a playoff game.

In the NFC Championship Game, Cutler completed 6-of-14 passes for 80 yards and an interception, before a knee injury sidelined him early in the third quarter of a 21–14 loss Green Bay. The Bears did not make an immediate announcement about Cutler's condition, allowing speculation to grow. In possibly the NFL's first player-on-player social media attack, Cutler was being criticized seconds after the injury by Maurice Jones-Drew, Darnell Dockett, Deion Sanders, and Mark Schlereth. Bears coach Lovie Smith later clarified that he, and not Cutler, made the decision after consulting the medical and training staff. The following day, an MRI revealed Cutler had sprained his MCL. Hall of Fame quarterback Troy Aikman commented that the widespread reaction reflected hostility towards Cutler's career-long polarizing attitude. Bears teammates defended Cutler, and his critics themselves became the targets of insults from other players like Packers players Aaron Rodgers ("disrespectful"), LeRoy Butler ("stupid"), and B. J. Raji ("pretty wrong and a lot of times it has a lot to do with jealousy").

==== 2011 season ====
Throughout 2011, Martz was commonly criticized for aggressive play-calling in a pass-happy offense, leading to unnecessary wear on a quarterback returning from injury. The frustration led to Cutler being caught on microphone asking a player to go to Martz on the sideline and, "Tell him I said fuck him!" during Week 6 against the Vikings.

In the season opener against the Atlanta Falcons, Cutler started the season off on a good note with 312 passing yards, two touchdowns, and one interception in the 30–12 win. In Week 2 against the New Orleans Saints, Cutler was sacked 6 times and kicked in the throat. By Week 10, Cutler had a rating of 85.7 (12th in the league) and the Bears were 6–3. However, on November 20, Cutler broke the thumb on his throwing hand tackling San Diego's Antoine Cason after an interception. He played through the final drive for the win, but the injury required season-ending surgery.

Under backups Caleb Hanie and Josh McCown, the Bears lost six of their remaining seven games and missed the playoffs. Overall, in his shortened 2011 season, Cutler had 2,319 passing yards, 13 touchdowns, and seven interceptions.

==== 2012 season ====
Before the season, the Bears replaced Martz with Mike Tice, hired Bates as quarterbacks coach, and acquired Marshall from the Miami Dolphins. Unlike Martz, Tice allowed Cutler to call audibles at the line of scrimmage.

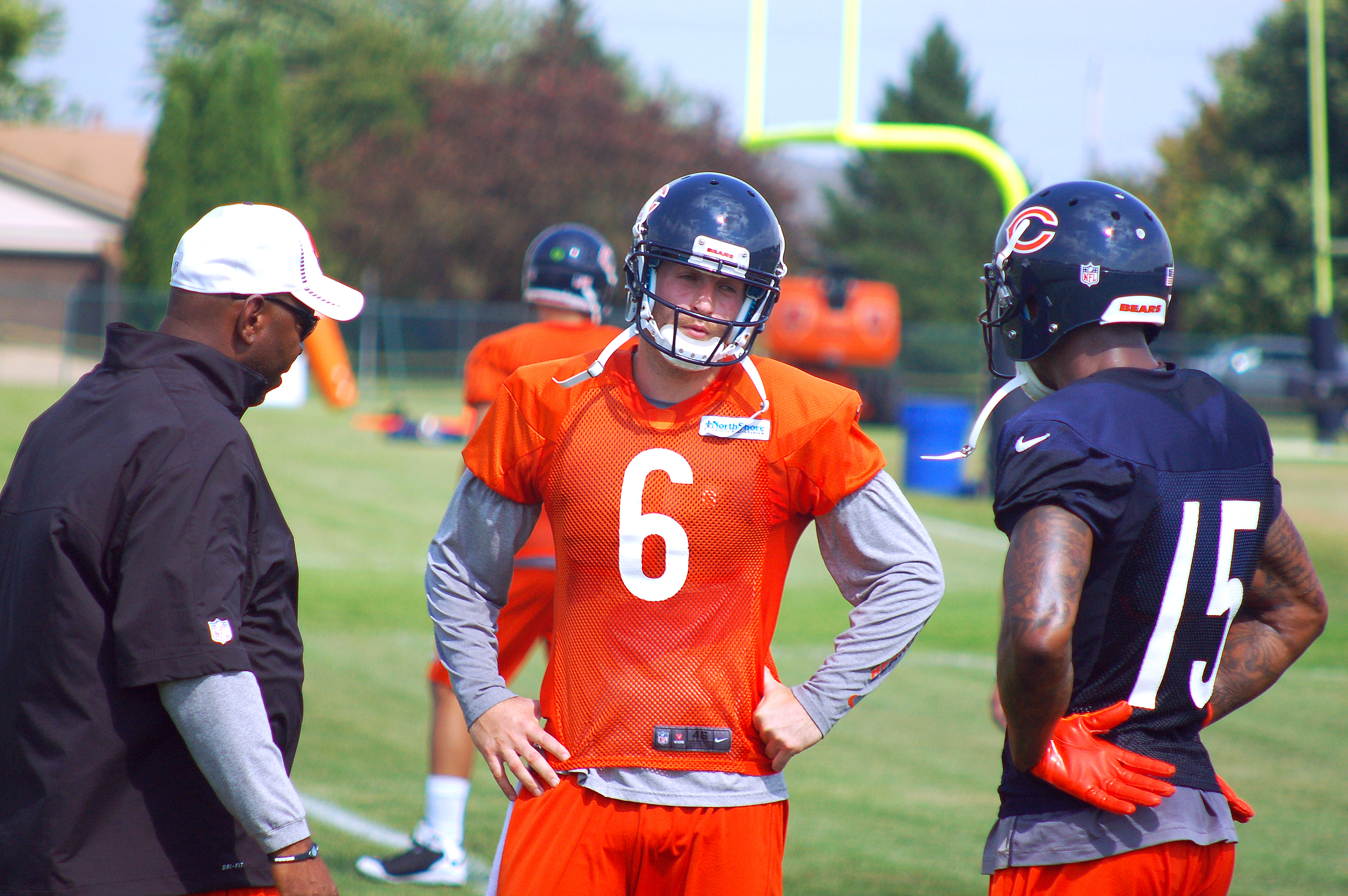
Cutler talking to Brandon Marshall at Bears training camp in 2012

Cutler started his season by throwing an interception returned for a touchdown by the Indianapolis Colts' Jerrell Freeman. He bounced back from a 4.9 first-quarter passer rating to finish the game 21-of-35 for 333 yards, two touchdowns, and a 98.9 passer rating, in a 41–21 victory. In Week 2, Cutler was sacked seven times and threw four interceptions against Green Bay, yelling at his porous offensive line and bumping left tackle J'Marcus Webb; he had a 28.2 passer rating in the 23–10 loss. The line responded by surrendering just five sacks in the next three games, all wins, the second a 34–18 win over Dallas where Cutler was 18 of 24 for 275 yards, two touchdowns, no interceptions, and the third-best passer rating of his career (140.1). After close wins over Detroit and Carolina, Cutler had three touchdowns and no interceptions with a rating of 138.1 in a 51–20 blowout of Tennessee, bringing the Bears to 7–1 on the season, and Cutler's personal record in games with a 100+ QB rating to 25–0.

In Week 10 against the Houston Texans, Cutler joined Michael Vick and Alex Smith as the third NFL quarterback out with a concussion that day. His replacement Jason Campbell lost that game and the next. Cutler returned for a Week 12 win over the Minnesota VIkings. Despite a 119.6 passer rating against the Seattle Seahawks in week 13, the Bears lost in overtime, which was followed by two close losses to Minnesota and Green Bay. Cutler finished the season with two solid performances in easy wins over the Cardinals and Lions. Despite a 10–6 record, the Bears missed the playoffs.

Cutler again finished the season in the top five for sacked taken, but led the league in fourth-quarter passer rating with 114.7. In just four seasons, he was already the Bears' all-time team leader in passer rating (81.9) and completions (1,034), and second in yards (12,292), touchdowns (82), and completion percentage (59.6%). His reunion with Marshall led to franchise records of 118 receptions for 1,508 yards, and the seventh-year receiver's first All-Pro selection.

==== 2013 season ====
New head coach Marc Trestman developed a successful strategy to better protect his quarterback, and in the first six games Cutler was sacked only nine times compared to 23, 19, and 19 in the previous three seasons. Under the new scheme, Cutler began the season with three consecutive games with a 90+ passer rating for the first time since 2009. In each of those wins, he threw touchdowns in the 4th quarter, including game winners in Week 1 against Cincinnati and Week 2 against Minnesota. He threw three interceptions in a Week 4 loss to Detroit. In Week 5, Cutler was sacked three times and fumbled in the first 16 minutes of the game, then rebounded for 358 yards, two touchdowns, and a season-high 128.1 passer rating in defeat. He threw two touchdowns in a Week 6 win over the New York Giants. Through the first six games, he had a career best 95.2 passer rating, five multiple touchdown games, and a franchise-record 1,630 passing yards.

However, against the Washington Redskins the following week, his 100th career start, Cutler tore a groin muscle when sacked by Chris Baker, breaking Jim Harbaugh's franchise record for most times sacked. McCown was solid in relief, barely losing that Redskins game in a 45–41 shootout, and after the bye-week tossing two touchdowns in a 27–21 win at Green Bay. Cutler was medically cleared to return early for the Week 10 game against Detroit, where he had 250 yards, one touchdown, and one interception before a hit from Stephen Tulloch in the second quarter finally drove him from the game on the Bears' last drive. McCown drove 74 yards in 90 seconds for a touchdown, but the two-point conversion failed and the Bears lost 21–19.

Cutler missed the next four games with his injury and McCown played well in his absence, leading to some controversy when Cutler was reinstated as the starting QB in Week 15. Cutler threw two interceptions in the first half against the Cleveland Browns, one returned for a touchdown, but ended with a 102.2 passer rating and three touchdowns. In the next week's 54–11 loss to the Philadelphia Eagles, Cutler ended up with 14,687 career passing yards for the Bears, one more than Sid Luckman's franchise record. The season finale was a winner-takes-the-division matchup at home against Green Bay. Despite Cutler's 15-of-24 passing for 226 yards, two touchdowns, and one interception for a 103.8 passer rating, the Bears lost 33–28 on a last-minute Hail Mary, missing the playoffs with an 8–8 record. Cutler ended the season completing 224 of 355 passes for 2,621 yards, 19 touchdowns, 12 interceptions, and a career-high 89.2 passer rating.

On January 2, 2014, Cutler signed a seven-year deal, keeping him with the Bears through the 2020 NFL season.

==== 2014 season ====
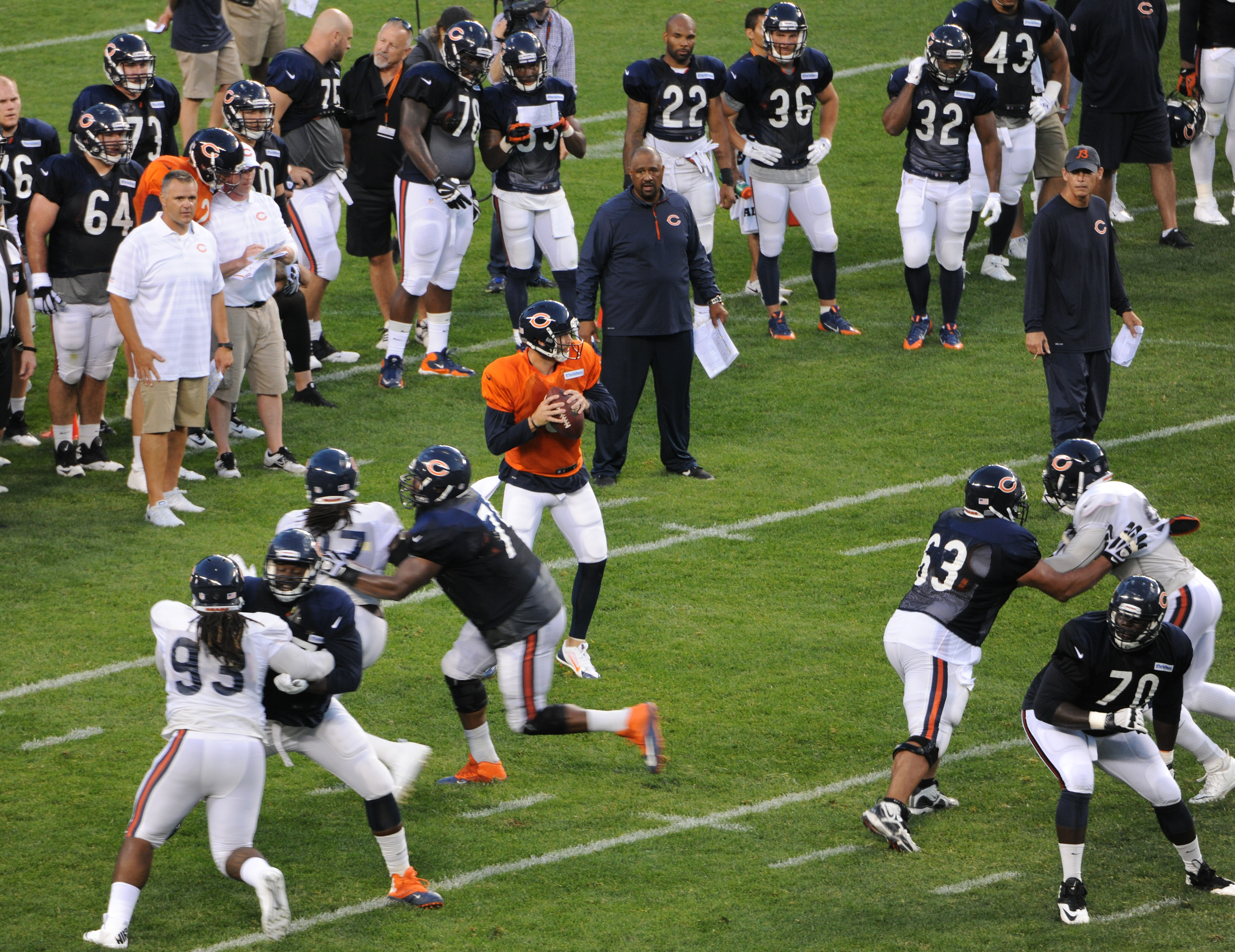
Marc Trestman looks on as Cutler practices in 2014.

Cutler and the Bears struggled to a 5–11 record in Trestman's second year as head coach. The Bears opened the season with an overtime loss to the Buffalo Bills, in which Cutler threw two touchdowns and interceptions for 349 yards. The next week, the team overcame a 17-point deficit behind Cutler's four touchdown passes to defeat the San Francisco 49ers; Cutler had made just 8 of 18 passes for 38 yards before taking a late hit from Quinton Dial, after which he completed all but one of his next 16 attempts for 138 yards and the touchdowns. The next week, he led the Bears to a 27–19 victory against the New York Jets, tallying 225 passing yards, two touchdowns and no interceptions.

In both Weeks 4 and 5, Cutler threw two touchdowns and two interceptions in defeats to the Packers and Panthers. In Week 6, Cutler recorded a career-high 381 passing yards, defeating Atlanta 27–13. Cutler recorded just 190 yards in a loss to Miami, then threw three touchdowns but suffered a lopsided 51–23 defeat to the New England Patriots, and threw two interceptions in an even worse 55–14 loss to the Packers. The 3–6 Bears drew criticism from former Bears linebacker Brian Urlacher, who suggested that general manager Phil Emery shouldn't have re-signed Cutler: "Financially, he is one of the elite guys in the NFL... He just hasn't produced like an elite quarterback."

Cutler and the Bears rebounded with two consecutive wins. He threw three touchdowns, two interceptions, and 330 yards against the Vikings, and 130 yards and one passing touchdown against Tampa Bay. That would be the last win of the season. Cutler started the Thanksgiving Day game against Detroit with two passing touchdowns, but the Bears stumbled for the remainder of the game en route to 34–17 loss. He finished the game with two touchdowns, two interceptions, and 280 yards. The Bears suffered their eighth loss of the season to the Dallas Cowboys, in which Cutler threw 341 yards, two touchdowns and one interception, mathematically eliminating the Bears from the playoffs. Under criticism, offensive coordinator Aaron Kromer partially blamed Cutler's audibles and impromptu play calling for the poor record, but later apologized to Cutler and the Bears organization in a press conference. The next week, Cutler threw two touchdowns, three interceptions, and just 194 yards for a season-low 55.8 passer rating in a loss to the Saints.

Trestman demoted Cutler in favor of Jimmy Clausen, but Cutler returned when Clausen suffered a concussion in the loss to Detroit. In the Bears' season finale against the Vikings, Cutler completed 23 of 36 passes for 172 yards, and a 63 passer rating in the loss.

Cutler described the 2014 season as the most disappointing of his career due to high expectations entering the year. In 15 games, he accrued 3,812 passing yards, a career-high 28 passing touchdowns, but led the NFL with 18 interceptions. Despite the turnovers, Cutler's 2014 season remains one of the best statistical passing seasons in Chicago Bears history. He ranks third all time in single-season passing yards and second in passing touchdowns by a Bears quarterback. He set the all-time Bears record for all-purpose yards in a single season with 4,003, which was later broken by Caleb Williams in 2024.

==== 2015 season ====
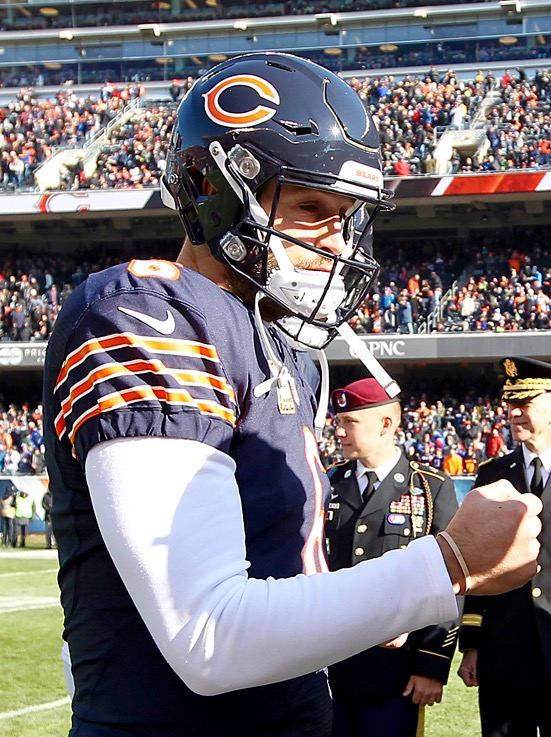
Cutler in 2015

The Bears hired John Fox as their new head coach on January 19. Both Fox and GM Ryan Pace were initially lukewarm on Cutler, but reluctantly decided to keep Cutler as the starter. Tight end Martellus Bennett indicated his teammates were similarly unenthusiastic. New offensive coordinator Adam Gase also expressed reservations about the upcoming season, but both otherwise enjoyed working together throughout the offseason.

Cutler began the season with a lackluster 225 yards in a loss to Green Bay, tossing a last-minute touchdown to Bennett to bring his rating up to 67.5. He began Week 2 against the Cardinals with 8 straight completions, but then threw an interception and injured his hamstring failing to stop safety Tony Jefferson from returning it for a touchdown. Without Cutler, the Bears lost 48–23 to the Cardinals, and were shutout 26–0 in Week 3 at Seattle. Cutler returned against Oakland, throwing two first half touchdowns, and drove 48 yards in the last 2:05 to set-up a game-winning field goal. In Week 5, Cutler threw two touchdowns in the final 3:05 for a dramatic 18–17 victory over the Chiefs and a tie of Jim McMahon's record for the most wins in team history. In Week 6, Cutler was just short of a third consecutive comeback: despite a season-best 353 yards, a 4th quarter touchdown and 2-point conversion, followed by a 69-yard drive in 17 seconds for a game-tying field goal, the Bears lost in overtime to the Lions. After the bye, in Week 8 Cutler again scored a go-ahead touchdown late in the 4th quarter, but the Vikings rallied for two late scores and a 23–20 win. In Week 9 against San Diego, Cutler threw yet another late 4th quarter touchdown, which both won the game 22–19, and set the Bears franchise record for touchdowns as a Bear (139). In Week 10, Cutler had a stellar performance in a 37–13 win against St. Louis, going 19-for-24 for 258 yards, three touchdowns (two of them for 80+ yards for the only time in franchise history) and no interceptions; his 151.0 passer rating was a career-best.

That would be the season's high point for both the 4–5 Bears and Cutler. Despite a 265-yard performance against the eventual Super Bowl 50 champion Denver Broncos on November 22, 2015, the Bears lost 17–15. They proceeded to go 2–5 the rest of the season, four of the losses by less than 7 points. Cutler had three unremarkable games in narrow losses to Denver and San Francisco, with a narrow win at Green Bay in between. In the Broncos game, Cutler led a 65-yard, potential game-tying drive, but Bears running back Jeremy Langford was stopped on the two-point conversion attempt, and the Bears lost 17–15. In Week 14, Cutler threw for 315 yards and two touchdowns against Washington, including a 50-yard completion with two minutes remaining, but Robbie Gould missed the game-tying field goal in a 24–21 loss. The next week, Cutler was sacked five times and threw an interception in a 38–17 loss to Minnesota, then had just 156 yards but a 100.2 passer rating in a win over Tampa Bay. In the season finale against Detroit, Cutler had two touchdowns, but three interceptions including one deep in Lions territory at the 2 minute warning to seal the 24–20 loss.

Despite his receiving unit being plagued by injuries, Cutler had one of his best seasons as he ended 2015 with 3,629 passing yards, 21 touchdowns, 11 interceptions, and career highs in passer rating (92.3) and completion percentage (64.4). The 11 interceptions were the lowest in his career and resulted in an interception percentage of 2.3, the lowest in a season when he has started at least 12 games, while 21 touchdowns were his second-most since 2011 and the 3,629 yards were the third-most in his career. On third down, Cutler had a 103.2 passer rating (fourth in the NFL) after completing 91 of 141 passes for 1,242 yards, seven touchdowns and two interceptions.

==== 2016 season ====
With Gase's departure to become the head coach of the Miami Dolphins, quarterbacks coach Dowell Loggains was promoted to offensive coordinator. In Cutler's first two games, he was sacked eight times and had two interceptions in losses to the Houston Texans (where he injured his right thumb but completed the game), and Philadelphia Eagles (where he re-aggravated his injury and was replaced by Brian Hoyer). He missed the next five games before making his return against the Vikings, where he completed 20 of 31 passes for 252 yards, a touchdown and a 100.5 passer rating en route to a 20–10 victory. Tight end Zach Miller praised Cutler's performance in his return, adding that he delivered a halftime speech to motivate his teammates. Cutler fumbled and threw two interceptions (including a pick-6) in a loss to Tampa Bay. Cutler sustained a labrum injury in his throwing shoulder on November 20, in a loss to the Giants, and missed the rest of the season. In his five games in 2016, Cutler recorded 1,059 passing yards, four touchdowns, five interceptions, and a 78.1 passer rating.

On March 9, 2017, Cutler was released by the Bears through a $2 million buyout clause, after the guaranteed years in his seven-year contract had run out. After Cutler's lackluster performances and injuries, the move was expected for months, as the Bears decided to award a $45 million contract to Mike Glennon.

In May, Cutler announced his retirement from professional football and was hired by Fox Sports to be a commentator.

=== Miami Dolphins ===
On August 3, 2017, Dolphins quarterback Ryan Tannehill suffered a season-ending injury, and the team reached out to the retired Cutler. On August 7, Cutler signed a one-year, $10 million contract with the Dolphins, reuniting him with Gase.

In Week 2, the Dolphins won their first game against the Los Angeles Chargers, 19–17. Cutler was 24-of-33 for 230 yards with a touchdown to wide receiver Kenny Stills in the road victory. In a Week 7 game against the New York Jets, Cutler suffered multiple cracked ribs. He was replaced by Matt Moore during the game and was ruled out for the following week's game against the Baltimore Ravens. He returned in Week 9 to face the Oakland Raiders. In the 27–24 loss, he was very efficient going 34-of-42 for 311 yards and a touchdown. In Week 11, Cutler suffered a concussion, which caused him to miss the team's next game. Cutler had his best performance of the year on Monday Night Football against New England as he outplayed Tom Brady and the Dolphins upset the Patriots. This was Cutler's first and only win against Brady in his career. Cutler threw three touchdowns in the win.

On December 27, he said he would probably only continue his NFL career if he can be a starter, stating, "I wouldn't want to move again or go somewhere just to back up." He started 14 games and finished with 2,666 passing yards, 19 touchdowns, and 14 interceptions for the Dolphins in the 2017 season. The Dolphins did not make the playoffs and Cutler went 6–8 as a starter. Many teammates praised Cutler during the season; Stills described him as "a good man. [...] People in other places have kind of given him a hard time. I got to know him as a man and as a player and I appreciate him. I like him. I'm thankful for the experience of playing with him, catching some balls from him."

== Career statistics ==
=== NFL ===
Legend
| | Led the league |
| **Bold** | Career high |

==== Regular season ====
| Year | Team | Games | | | Passing | | | | | | | | Rushing | | | | Sacks | | Fumbles | |
| Year | Team | GP | GS | Record | Cmp | Att | Pct | Yds | Avg | TD | Int | Rtg | Att | Yds | Avg | TD | Sck | Yds | Fum | Lost |
|---|---|---|---|---|---|---|---|---|---|---|---|---|---|---|---|---|---|---|---|---|
| 2006 | DEN | 5 | 5 | 2−3 | 81 | 137 | 59.1 | 1,001 | 7.3 | 9 | 5 | 88.5 | 12 | 18 | 1.5 | 0 | 13 | 85 | 8 | 2 |
| 2007 | DEN | 16 | 16 | 7−9 | 297 | 467 | 63.6 | 3,497 | 7.5 | 20 | 14 | 88.1 | 44 | 205 | 4.7 | 1 | 27 | 153 | 11 | 4 |
| 2008 | DEN | 16 | 16 | 8−8 | **384** | **616** | 62.3 | **4,526** | 7.3 | 25 | 18 | 86.0 | **57** | 200 | 3.5 | **2** | 11 | 69 | 5 | 2 |
| 2009 | CHI | 16 | 16 | 7−9 | 336 | 555 | 60.5 | 3,666 | 6.6 | 27 | **26** | 76.8 | 40 | 173 | 4.3 | 1 | 35 | 204 | 9 | 1 |
| 2010 | CHI | 15 | 15 | **10−5** | 261 | 432 | 60.4 | 3,274 | 7.6 | 23 | 16 | 86.3 | 50 | 232 | 4.6 | 1 | **52** | **352** | 10 | **6** |
| 2011 | CHI | 10 | 10 | 7−3 | 182 | 314 | 58.0 | 2,319 | 7.4 | 13 | 7 | 85.7 | 18 | 55 | 3.1 | 1 | 23 | 159 | 7 | 3 |
| 2012 | CHI | 15 | 15 | **10−5** | 255 | 434 | 58.8 | 3,033 | 7.0 | 19 | 14 | 81.3 | 41 | **233** | **5.7** | 0 | 38 | 250 | 8 | 4 |
| 2013 | CHI | 11 | 11 | 5−6 | 224 | 355 | 63.1 | 2,621 | 7.4 | 19 | 12 | 89.2 | 23 | 118 | 5.1 | 0 | 19 | 132 | 5 | 3 |
| 2014 | CHI | 15 | 15 | 5−10 | 370 | 561 | **66.0** | 3,812 | 6.8 | **28** | 18 | 88.6 | 39 | 191 | 4.9 | **2** | 38 | 223 | **12** | **6** |
| 2015 | CHI | 15 | 15 | 6−9 | 311 | 483 | 64.4 | 3,659 | 7.6 | 21 | 11 | **92.3** | 38 | 201 | 5.3 | 1 | 29 | 150 | 8 | 5 |
| 2016 | CHI | 5 | 5 | 1−4 | 81 | 137 | 59.1 | 1,059 | **7.7** | 4 | 5 | 78.1 | 5 | 24 | 4.8 | 0 | 17 | 104 | 6 | 2 |
| 2017 | MIA | 14 | 14 | 6−8 | 266 | 429 | 62.0 | 2,666 | 6.2 | 19 | 14 | 80.8 | 15 | 25 | 1.7 | 0 | 20 | 154 | 6 | 0 |
| Career | | 153 | 153 | 74−79 | 3,048 | 4,920 | 62.0 | 35,133 | 7.1 | 227 | 160 | 85.3 | 382 | 1,675 | 4.4 | 9 | 322 | 2,035 | 95 | 38 |

==== Postseason ====
| Year | Team | Games | | | Passing | | | | | | | | Rushing | | | | Sacks | | Fumbles | |
| Year | Team | GP | GS | Record | Cmp | Att | Pct | Yds | Avg | TD | Int | Rtg | Att | Yds | Avg | TD | Sck | Yds | Fum | Lost |
|---|---|---|---|---|---|---|---|---|---|---|---|---|---|---|---|---|---|---|---|---|
| 2010 | CHI | 2 | 2 | 1–1 | 21 | 42 | 50.0 | 354 | 8.4 | 2 | 1 | 84.8 | 10 | 53 | 5.3 | 2 | 5 | 28 | 2 | 0 |
| Career | | 2 | 2 | 1–1 | 21 | 42 | 50.0 | 354 | 8.4 | 2 | 1 | 84.8 | 10 | 53 | 5.3 | 2 | 5 | 28 | 2 | 0 |

=== College ===
| Season | Team | Passing | | | | | | | | | Rushing | | | |
| Season | Team | Cmp | Att | Pct | Yds | Y/A | TD | Int | Sck | Eff | Att | Yds | Avg | TD |
|---|---|---|---|---|---|---|---|---|---|---|---|---|---|---|
| 2001 | Vanderbilt | Redshirt | | | | | | | | | | | | |
| 2002 | Vanderbilt | 103 | 212 | 48.6 | 1,433 | 6.8 | 10 | 9 | 17 | 112.4 | 123 | 393 | 3.2 | 9 |
| 2003 | Vanderbilt | 187 | 327 | 57.2 | 2,347 | 7.2 | 18 | 13 | 16 | 127.7 | 115 | 299 | 2.6 | 1 |
| 2004 | Vanderbilt | 147 | 241 | 61.0 | 1,844 | 7.7 | 10 | 5 | 24 | 134.8 | 109 | 349 | 3.2 | 6 |
| 2005 | Vanderbilt | 273 | 462 | 59.1 | 3,073 | 6.7 | 21 | 9 | 23 | 126.1 | 106 | 215 | 2.0 | 1 |
| Career | | 710 | 1,242 | 57.2 | 8,697 | 7.0 | 59 | 36 | 80 | 125.9 | 453 | 1,256 | 2.8 | 17 |

== Career highlights ==
=== Awards and honors ===
NFL

- Pro Bowl (2008)
- AFC passing yards leader (2008)
- AFC Offensive Player of the Month (September 2008)
- AFC Offensive Player of the Week – (Week 10, 2008)
- Two-time NFC Offensive Player of the Week – (Week 16, 2009; Week 12, 2010)
- Six-time FedEx Air Player of the Week – (Week 10, 2008; Week 13, 2008; Week 14, 2008; Week 16, 2009; Week 1, 2010; Week 9, 2017)

College

- The Sporting News third-team freshman All-American (2002)
- Associated Press first-team freshman All-SEC (2002)
- First-team All-SEC (2005)
- SEC Offensive Player of the Year (2005)
- Johnny Unitas Golden Arm Award finalist (2005)
- Maxwell Award Semifinalist (2005)
- Davey O'Brien Award Finalist (2005)
- Manning Award Finalist (2005)
- Sammy Baugh Trophy Finalist (2005)
- Vanderbilt Athletics Hall of Fame (2016)

State Hall of Fames

- Indiana Football Hall of Fame (2022)

=== Records ===
==== Chicago Bears franchise records ====
As of 2022, Jay Cutler held at least 12 Bears franchise records, including:

- Completions: career (2,020), season (384 in 2008)
- Pass Attempts: career (3,271), season (615 in 2008)
- Passing Yards: career (23,443)
- Passing TDs: career (154), playoff game (2 on January 16, 2011, against the Seattle Seahawks; with 3 others)
- Sacked: career (251), game (9 on October 3, 2010, against the New York Giants; with 2 others)
- Pass Yds/Game: career (229.8) (minimum 1,500 attempts)
- 300+ yard passing games: career (16), season (4 in 2014; with Brian Hoyer and Mitchell Trubisky)

Other franchise records (as of 2022)

- Highest Completion Percentage in a Single Season: 66.0% (2014) (15 starts)
- Most Career 4th Quarter Comeback Wins: 16 (2009–2016)
- Most Career Game Winning Drives: 18 (2009–2016)
- Most Wins: 51 (2009–2016)

==== Vanderbilt records ====
Vanderbilt University school career records:

- Total offense: 9,953
- Combined touchdowns: 76

== In the media ==
An animated representation of Cutler briefly appeared in the South Park episode "Guitar Queer-O." The show is set in Colorado and the characters are avid Broncos fans. Two characters, Stan and Kyle, meet Cutler and say, "Nice to meet you. I mean, you kinda suck, but my dad says you might be good some day." Cutler himself later responded to the episode, saying, "It was cool. I thought it was funny. They can make fun of me if they want to."

Cutler, along with former Broncos tight end Tony Scheffler and former Broncos backup quarterback Preston Parsons, took part in an episode of Oprah's Big Give filmed in Denver in 2007. The episode aired on ABC on March 9, 2008.

In 2011, after the Bears lost five straight games while Cutler was out with a thumb injury, Chicago recording artist Magic 1 recorded "Cutty Come Back", a parody of the song "Baby Come Back".

An internet meme, called "Smokin' Jay Cutler", portrays pictures of Cutler in an apathetic state with a cigarette photoshopped into his mouth. Cutler commented he is aware of the meme and "gets a kick out of that". Aaron Rodgers of the Green Bay Packers performed a smoking gesture to reference the meme during a 38–14 win over the Bears in 2014.

In 2013, Cutler played himself in an episode of the comedy show The League alongside his then-wife, Kristin Cavallari, who appeared in one other episode of the show.

Cutler regularly appeared on the show Very Cavallari between 2018 and 2020.

He became a panelist on the weekly highlight show Inside the NFL in 2023.

== Personal life ==
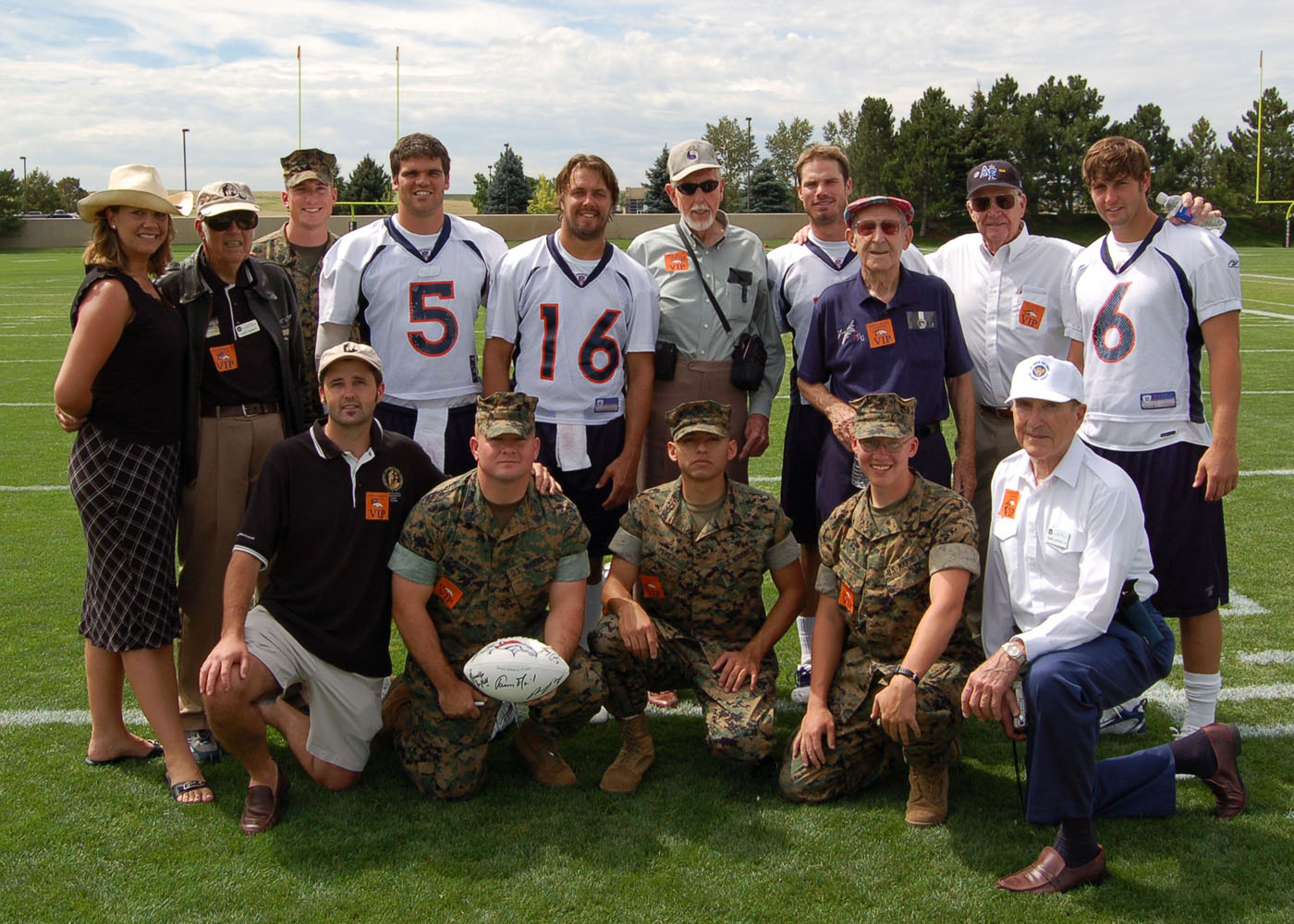
Cutler (#6, top row, far right) with Broncos teammates and Marines from Buckley Air Force Base in 2006.

=== Health ===
On May 1, 2008, Cutler announced that he was diagnosed with type 1 diabetes and needs daily insulin shots. He is responding well with the insulin treatments.

Cutler works with Dedicated to Diabetes, which is a Denver-based organization that aims to improve public knowledge about diabetes.

=== Marriage and children ===
Cutler began dating Kristin Cavallari in September 2010 and became engaged to her in April 2011. They called off the engagement in July 2011, but subsequently confirmed their reconciliation that November. Cutler and Cavallari married on June 7, 2013, in Nashville, Tennessee. They have two sons and one daughter. Despite the birth of his first son coming the day before the Bears played their preseason opener against the Denver Broncos, Cutler dressed for the game, though he did not play.

According to the Chicago Tribune, Cutler and Cavallari are on record as not having vaccinated their children.

In April 2020, the couple announced that they were getting a divorce, with Cavallari saying the split came as a result of the two simply "growing apart." In May 2021, the couple had not finalized their divorce due to financial issues. In June 2022, it was reported that their settlement had been finalized and the couple was officially divorced.

In 2023, Cutler revealed on Instagram that he was dating Samantha Robertson. One year later in 2024, People reported that Cutler and Robertson were engaged.

=== Business ventures ===
In 2021, Cutler launched a meat subscription service called CUTS and his podcast "Uncut" a few months later. In 2022, Cutler launched Gratis Brewing, which is based in Nashville. He also is a founding partner in Outsider.com, a digital media lifestyle company.

Cutler was dropped from an advertising campaign for Uber Eats following his social media postings on the efficacy of COVID-19 vaccines and the use of face masks in schools.

=== Politics ===
Cutler supported Mitt Romney in the 2012 United States presidential election, and Donald Trump in 2016 and 2020.

Following the 2020 election, Cutler created and then deleted a post on his Instagram account questioning Joe Biden's victory.

=== Driving while intoxicated conviction ===
On October 17, 2024, Cutler was arrested in Franklin, Tennessee, on suspicion of driving while intoxicated and possessing a firearm while under the influence. It was also reported that he attempted to flee the scene and pay the driver of the car he crashed into $2,000 to not call the police, and later refused sobriety testing. He was released from Williamson County Jail after posting a $5,000 bond. Cutler has been charged with DUI-first offense, possession of a handgun-under the influence, failure to exercise due care to avoid a collision and implied consent.

On August 26, 2025, Cutler was sentenced to four days in jail as part of a plea deal with prosecutors. As part of the agreement, prosecutors dismissed the weapons possession charge, and Cutler entered a guilty plea to driving under the influence. He was ordered to surrender a pistol found in his car at the time of the accident, pay a $350 fine and attend a DUI safety class, in addition to being placed on unsupervised probation for one year. His Tennessee drivers license was also revoked.
