= Get This Party Started =

- Genre: Reality
- Directed by: Tony Sacco
- Presented by: Ethan Erickson; Kristin Cavallari
- Composer: Lindsay Tomasic
- Country of origin: United States
- Original language: English
- No. of seasons: 1
- No. of episodes: 2

Production
- Executive producer: Allison Grodner
- Producers: Missy Bania; Alexis Brown; Debbie Ganz; Lisa Ganz; Jenny Hope; Leyla Johnson; Don Luciano; Jeff Anderson Munkres; Erica Paige; Scott Schwartz; Danny Shaner; Shawn Sheridan; Robyn Williams
- Editors: Chris Jones; Brian Waingrow
- Running time: 45–48 minutes

Original release
- Network: UPN
- Release: February 7 – February 14, 2006

Get This Party Started is an American reality television series hosted by Ethan Erickson and Kristin Cavallari in early February 2006, which aired on UPN. It was the final show to premiere on UPN before the network shut down in September 2006 when it merged with The WB to form The CW.

== Synopsis ==
The series set out to throw surprise parties for deserving people by their friends and family. Hosts Ethan Erickson and Kristin Cavallari worked with Lara Shriftman, a special events coordinator, and a team of celebrity event planners to create a unique and extravagant party for a different person each week. The program was scheduled in the lowest-rated time slot of the 2005-06 television season in UPN's 9:00 pm–10:00 pm Tuesday slot, where Sex, Love & Secrets had failed before. Get This Party Started garnered low ratings and was canceled by the network after only two episodes.

The show ended up rated 156th, last out of the 156 programs which aired on the six major American broadcast networks in the 2005–06 season.
