= Wild Cherry (film) =

2009 film by Dana Lustig

- Theatrical release poster
- Directed by: Dana Lustig
- Written by: Grant Vetters; David Kolbowicz; Chris Charney
- Produced by: Gavin Wilding; Kyle Bornais; Byron A. Martin
- Starring: Tania Raymonde; Rumer Willis; Kristin Cavallari; Ryan Merriman; Tia Carrere; Rob Schneider
- Cinematography: Michael Marshall
- Edited by: Michael Doherty
- Music by: Chris Ainscough
- Production companies: Redwood Palms Pictures; Rampage Entertainment; Farpoint Films
- Distributed by: Anchor Bay Entertainment; Image Entertainment
- Release dates: April 10, 2009 (Canada); May 15, 2009 (United States)
- Running time: 85 minutes
- Countries: United States; Canada
- Language: English
- Budget: $3.5 million

Wild Cherry is a 2009 teen comedy film directed by Dana Lustig and starring Tania Raymonde, Rumer Willis, Kristin Cavallari, Ryan Merriman, Tia Carrere, and Rob Schneider.

== Plot ==
Helen McNichol, a high school senior, decides to lose her virginity to Stanford Prescott, her jock boyfriend. However, she learns that her name is written in the high school football team's secret "Bang Book" and it is Stanford's job to deflower her. The tables are turned and the battle begins when she and her two best friends, Katelyn Chase and Trish Van Doren, form a pact to maintain their virginity, embarrass the team and foil the plot against them. Helen gets Stanford by ramming him off of a go-cart track and then she, along with Katelyn and Trish, trick him and his two best friends (who are also Katelyn's and Trish's boyfriends) into accidentally making out with each other.

At a party, they slip a sex pill into the punch, giving Stanford and his friends erections. Helen confronts Katelyn and Trish about the sex pills and blames them for everything. Visiting Stanford at the hospital, Helen tries to apologize and make it up to him, but he turns her down and tells her to go away. Heartbroken about her breakup with Stanford, Helen initially decides not to go to his football game, but after a talk with her father Nathan about how people make mistakes in life, she changes her mind.

At the football game, Helen apologizes to Katelyn and Trish and they forgive her. Soon Stanford's team begins losing the game. During halftime, Helen takes the microphone and apologizes for everything and helps Stanford and his team into realizing why they are losing and Stanford forgives her. When the next match comes, Stanford and his team follow Helen's advice and defeat the other team. Everyone then goes to the victory party where Helen and Stanford finally have sex. Helen comes home after the party and sees Nathan sitting on a closed toilet playing a trombone through the window in which she smiles at.

== Cast ==
- Tania Raymonde as Helen McNichol
- Rumer Willis as Katelyn Chase
- Kristin Cavallari as Trish Van Doren
- Tia Carrere as Ms. Haumea
- Rob Schneider as Nathan McNichol
- Elle King as Sabrina
- Ryan Merriman as Stanford Prescott
- Jesse Moss as Brad "Skeets" Skeetowski
- John White as Franklin Peters
- Tegan Moss as Hannah

== Production ==
Film production took place in Winnipeg, Manitoba, from May 7 to May 29, 2008. School scenes were filmed at Technical Vocational High School.
