= Kristin Cavallari =

American television personality (born 1987)

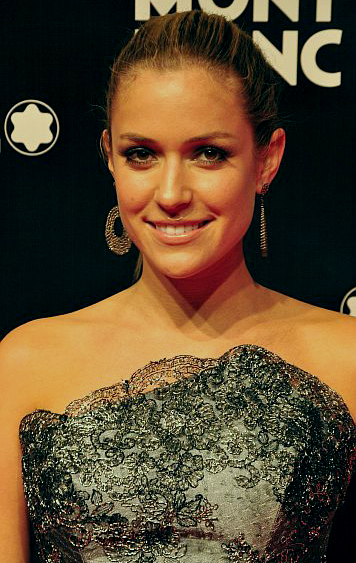
- Cavallari in 2010
- Born: Kristin Elizabeth Cavallari; January 5, 1987 (age 39); Denver, Colorado, U.S.
- Other name: Kristin Cutler
- Education: Loyola Marymount University (attended)
- Occupations: Television personality; fashion designer; businesswoman; author; actress
- Years active: 2004–present
- Spouse: Jay Cutler (m. 2013; div. 2022)
- Children: 3
- Website: kristincavallari.com

Kristin Elizabeth Cavallari (born January 5, 1987) is an American television personality, fashion designer and businesswoman. She first rose to fame in 2004 as a cast member on the popular MTV reality television series Laguna Beach: The Real Orange County (2004–2005), then on the spin-off MTV reality television series The Hills (2006–2010), and was later given her own E! reality series in which to star, Very Cavallari (2018–2020). She also starred as an actress on television shows and in films, including National Lampoon's Van Wilder: Freshman Year. In 2017, Cavallari founded the company Uncommon James, which sells jewelry, homeware, and beauty products.

== Early life ==
Kristin Elizabeth Cavallari was born in Denver, Colorado, to Judith Eifrig and Dennis Cavallari. She was their second child. Her older brother, Michael Cavallari, died from hypothermia following a car crash in 2015. She is of Italian heritage through her father and of German heritage through her mother.

After her parents divorced, Cavallari moved with her mother from Denver to Barrington, Illinois, a suburb of Chicago, where she lived until her freshman year of high school, when she moved to Laguna Beach, California, to live with her father and brother. She graduated from Laguna Beach High School in 2005.

She then briefly attended Loyola Marymount University in Los Angeles, but dropped out to pursue her acting career.

== Career ==
=== Reality television ===
Cavallari was in her junior year of high school when the first season of Laguna Beach: The Real Orange County began production. At the time, she was involved in an on-and-off relationship with high school senior Stephen Colletti. Cavallari's romance with Colletti caused a rivalry with another cast member, Lauren Conrad, which was covered in the show. In April 2026, a 20th anniversary reunion special was released reuniting the original cast of the show.

After Laguna Beach, Cavallari moved to Los Angeles and signed on the UPN reality television series Get This Party Started, which premiered in February 2006 and was canceled after airing two episodes.

In 2009, Cavallari joined the cast of the Laguna Beach spin-off series, The Hills, making her first appearance on the series during the fifth season's midseason finale at Heidi Montag and Spencer Pratt's wedding, where she caught the bouquet. For the second half of the season, Cavallari replaced Conrad as a main cast member and narrator. Despite originally signing a deal with MTV to appear in two additional seasons following the fifth, the sixth and final season concluded in July 2010. In 2021, Cavallari made two final guest appearances on the second season of The Hills' sequel, The Hills: New Beginnings.

Following The Hills, Cavallari appeared on various reality competition shows as a guest and as a contestant on the 13th season of ABC's Dancing with the Stars, partnering with two-time champion Mark Ballas. She was the third to be eliminated. In 2012, Cavallari began commentating the Academy Awards for E! and in 2014, she co-hosted the half-hour fashion and lifestyle trends show The Fabulist. She was also one of the judges responsible for crowning Miss Universe 2014, Paulina Vega.

In April 2018, E! announced a reality show starring Cavallari, Very Cavallari, which premiered that July and followed her opening the flagship store for Uncommon James. In May 2020, after three seasons, Cavallari announced that she was ending her series.

=== Acting ===
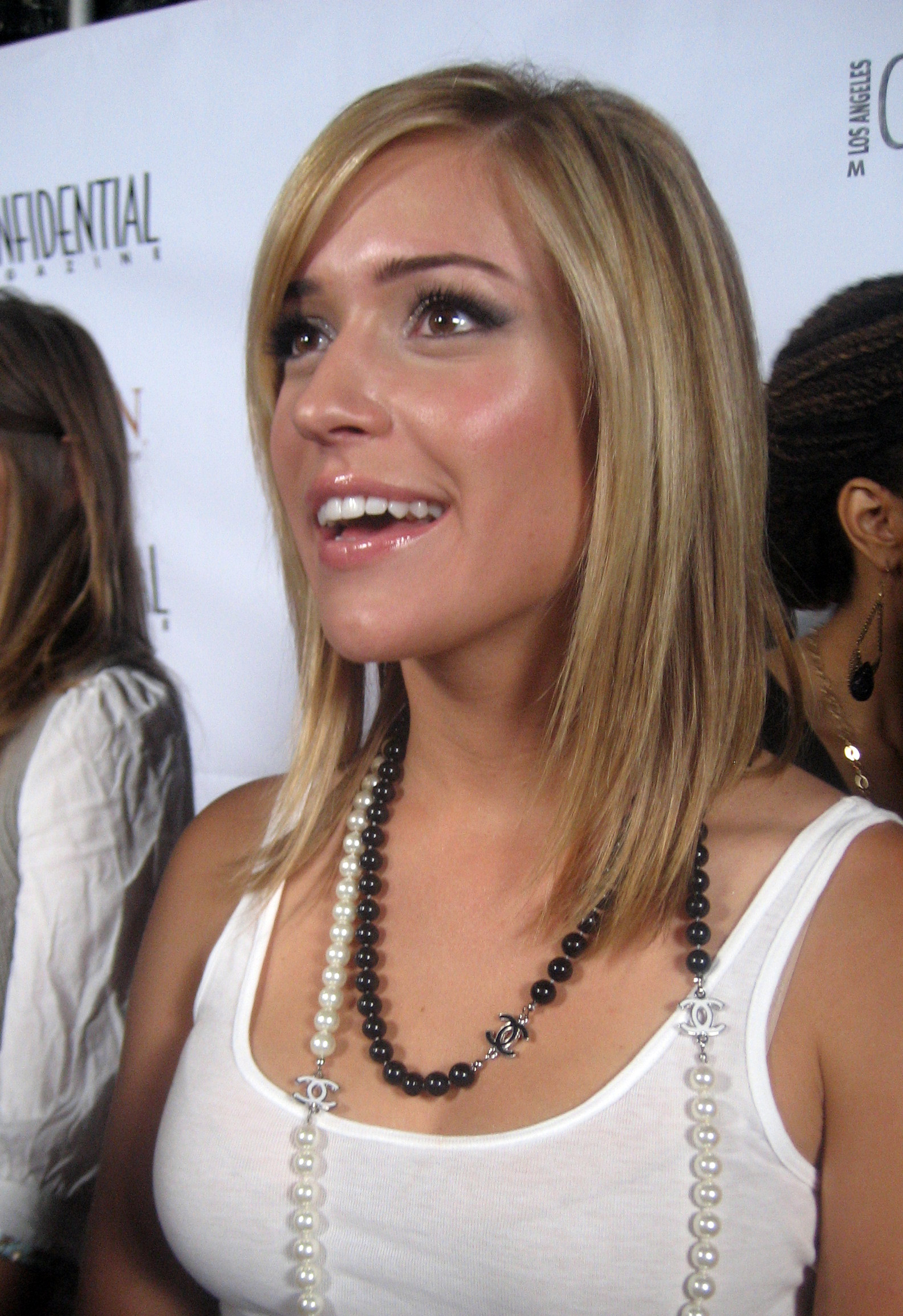
Cavallari in September 2008

Cavallari appeared on one episode of another UPN series, Veronica Mars, and went on to guest roles on series including CSI: NY, The Middle and Adventures in Hollyhood. In 2006, she signed on as Crystal in the horror film Fingerprints. In 2008, she had a supporting role as Summer in Spring Breakdown, which was released direct-to-DVD. She also starred in the independent film Green Flash with Torrey DeVitto. In 2009, she starred as Trish in the independent American high school comedy film Wild Cherry and as Kaitlyn in the direct-to-DVD film National Lampoon's Van Wilder: Freshman Year.

She made acting appearances with Jay Cutler and solo on the American sitcom The League in 2012 and 2013. She made a final acting appearance in 9-1-1: Nashville in 2026.

=== Fashion lines ===
Cavallari served as an ambassador for the children's charity OneKid OneWorld, traveling to El Salvador to rebuild schools in local communities in 2010. After another trip to Kenya the following year, Cavallari made her first foray in fashion design by collaborating with the company ShoeDazzle to design a spring shoe, with proceeds benefiting the charity.

In 2012, Cavallari designed the first of many shoe lines for the company Chinese Laundry. She launched her first jewelry collection in 2013, in collaboration with GLAMboutique. In 2014, she co-founded a jewelry line with her friend Chelsea Bulte called Emerald Duv; she left the brand in 2016 to launch her solo line the following year.

She founded her jewelry business, Uncommon James, in 2017, which later expanded into selling home and beauty products. She subsequently founded a now-defunct children's clothing line, Little James, in 2019.

In collaboration with Feat Clothing, she launched a limited-edition athleisure collection in July 2021.

=== Lifestyle books ===
Cavallari wrote her first book, the lifestyle-oriented autobiography Balancing in Heels, in 2016. She then published two cookbooks, True Roots and True Comfort, with recipes without gluten, dairy, or refined sugar, in 2018 and 2020, respectively. Both cookbooks were created in collaboration with Chef Mike Kubiesa. Her third cookbook, Truly Simple, was released on April 4, 2023.

All of her books were New York Times bestsellers, and her comfort food cookbook, True Comfort, was named one of the best cookbooks of the year by Delish.

=== Podcasts ===
In 2022, Cavallari started a podcast with her former Laguna Beach: The Real Orange County co-star Stephen Colletti called Back to the Beach with Kristin and Stephen, in collaboration with Dear Media. The podcast revisited the show with behind-the-scenes commentary and special guests.

In 2023, Cavallari launched a new podcast with Dear Media called Let's Be Honest with Kristin Cavallari primarily about relationship advice including interviews with experts and other celebrities. Correspondingly in 2025, she went on a tour of Chicago, Atlanta, Boston, and New York City to share insights and interview people in her life in front of live audiences, which was also filmed as part of her new reality show Honestly Cavallari: The Headline Tour. In October 2025, she signed a multi-year deal with Dear Media to continue her podcast.

== Personal life ==
In 2013, Cavallari married Chicago Bears quarterback Jay Cutler; they have three children. In 2017, following Cutler's retirement from football, they moved to Nashville. They finalized their divorce in 2022.

== Filmography ==
=== As actress ===
Year	Title	Role	Notes
2006	Veronica Mars	Kylie Marker	Episode: "Versatile Toppings"
2006	Fingerprints	Crystal	Main Role
2007	Cheerleader Camp	Julie	Television film
2007	Cane	Casey	Episode: "Family Business"
2007	iThunes	Sarah	2 episodes
2008	Green Flash	Lana	Direct-to-DVD release
2008	CSI: NY	Isabelle Vaughn	Episode: "Forbidden Fruit"
2008	Spring Breakdown	Seven #3	
2009	Wild Cherry	Trish van Doren	
2009	National Lampoon's Van Wilder: Freshman Year	Kaitlin Hayes	Direct-to-DVD release
2011	The Middle	Ms. Devereaux	Episode: "Friends, Lies, and Videotape"
2012–2013	The League	Herself	Season 4, Episode 4; Season 5, Episode 3
2026	9-1-1: Nashville	Herself	Season 1, Episode 15

=== As herself ===
Year	Title	Notes
2004–2005	Laguna Beach: The Real Orange County	28 episodes
2006	Get This Party Started	Host; 2 episodes
2009–2010	The Hills	23 episodes
2011	RuPaul's Drag Race	Guest; Season 3, Episode 5
2011	America's Next Top Model	Guest Judge; Season 17, Episode 3
2011	Dancing with the Stars	Contestant; Season 13, Eliminated week 3
2012	Cupcake Wars	Guest Judge; Season 6, Episode 9: "Kristin Cavallari's Baby Shower"
2016	Project Runway All Stars	Guest Judge; Season 5, Episode 9
2018–2020	Very Cavallari	30 episodes, also Executive Producer
2019	Paradise Hotel	Host; 7 episodes
2021	The Hills: New Beginnings	Special Guest; 2 episodes
2024	Jersey Shore: Family Vacation	Episode: "Rhinestone Cowboy"
2025	Honestly Cavallari: The Headline Tour	6 episodes, also Executive Producer
2026	The Reunion: Laguna Beach	TV Special, also Executive Producer

=== Music videos ===
Year	Title	Artist	Role	Ref(s)
2006	"For You I Will (Confidence)"	Teddy Geiger	Girl with boyfriend	
2008	"In Love with a Girl"	Gavin DeGraw	Girlfriend	
2010	"That's Beautiful to Me"	Jaron and the Long Road to Love	Juliet	
2026	"Goodbye to You"	Michelle Branch and Maren Morris	Friend	

== Published works ==
- Balancing in Heels: My Journey to Health, Happiness, and Making it all Work (2016)
- True Roots: A Mindful Kitchen With More Than 100 Recipes Free Of Gluten, Dairy, And Refined Sugar (2018)
- True Comfort: More Than 100 Cozy Recipes Free Of Gluten And Refined Sugar (2020)
- Truly Simple: 140 Healthy Recipes for Weekday Cooking (2023)

== Awards and nominations ==
Year	Award	Category	Production	Result
2006	Teen Choice Awards	Choice Female Reality TV Star	Laguna Beach: The Real Orange County	Nominated
2007	Hoboken International Film Festival	Best Supporting Actress	Fingerprints	Nominated
2010	Teen Choice Awards	Choice Female Reality TV Star	The Hills	Nominated
