= List of cast members from The City (2008 TV series) =

The City is the New York City-based spin-off of The Hills, which aired on MTV from December 29, 2008, until July 13, 2010.

The original cast included Whitney Port, Olivia Palermo, Jay Lyon, Adam Senn and Erin Lucas, with Roxy Olin and Erin Kaplan joining from the second half of the first season.

== Main cast members ==
Main cast (appears in opening credits)
Supporting cast (3+ episodes)
Guest cast (1–2 episodes)

Cast member	Seasons		
Cast member	1a	1b	2
Whitney Port	Main	Main	Main
Jay Lyon	Main	Guest	
Erin Lucas	Main		
Adam Senn	Main (Note: Credited onscreen as "Jay's roommate.")	Guest	
Olivia Palermo	Main	Main	Main
Roxy Olin		Main	Main
Erin "K." Kaplan		Main (Note: Credited as "Director, Public Relations, Elle Magazine.")	Main

Cast notes

== Supporting cast members ==
Supporting cast (3+ episodes)
Guest cast (1–2 episodes)

Cast member	Onscreen title	Seasons		
Cast member	Onscreen title	1a	1b	2
Emese Szenasy	Director of Public Relations	Recurring		
Alixe Boyer	VP, Global Image Director	Recurring		
Diane von Fürstenberg	—	Recurring		
Samantha Swetra	Assistant Buyer, Bergdorf Goodman (Note: Later as "Whitney's friend".)	Recurring	Recurring	Recurring
Nevan Donahue	Olivia's cousin	Recurring		
Elizabeth Merrineio	Whitney's co-worker	Recurring		
Kelly Cutrone	Owner, People's Revolution	Guest	Recurring	Recurring
Allie Crandell	Adam's girlfriend	Recurring	Guest	
Duncan Davies	Erin's boyfriend	Recurring		
J.R. Gudger	Erin's ex-boyfriend	Recurring		
Joe Zee	Creative Director, Elle Magazine	Guest	Recurring	Recurring
Freddie Fackelmayer	Samantha's friend		Recurring	
Harry Fackelmayer	Freddie's brother		Recurring	
Robbie Myers	Editor-in-Chief, Elle Magazine		Guest	Recurring
Seth Plattner	Robbie's assistant			Recurring
Zach Hyman	Photographer			Recurring
Louise Roe	Fashion journalist			Recurring

Cast notes
