= The City season 1 =

The City
- Season 1
- No. of episodes: 23

Release
- Original network: MTV
- Original release: December 29, 2008 – December 1, 2009

Season chronology
- Next → Season 2

The first season of The City premiered on December 29, 2008 and concluded on March 16, 2009. It followed Whitney Port's move to New York City after leaving Los Angeles as she followed her dream job. Instead of ordering a complete second season for The City MTV ordered 10 extra episodes to Season 1, which began on September 29, 2009 and completed on December 1, 2009. On The Hills/The City Aftershow that night, Port confirmed the show was renewed for a second season. Part I was filmed from August 2008 to February 2009, while Part II was filmed from April to September 2009.

== Synopsis ==
In Part 1, Whitney Port of 'The Hills' moves from her hometown of Los Angeles, California to Manhattan. The first half follows her, best friend Erin, and boyfriend Jay while Port tackles her new job at global design house, Diane Von Furstenberg. Jays roommate, Adam, struggles in a relationship with his on/off girlfriend, Allie. Olivia, New York socialite, and Whitney's co-worker, deals with her cousin Nevan, who's living off of her for a while. Erin deals with an old boyfriend coming into her life, and Samantha "Sammy", is by her friends side through all the drama. Meanwhile, the fashion world takes them all by storm daily in the fierce streets of New York. In the second half of season 1, newly single Port goes back to working for Kelly Cutrone while her friend/former co-worker, Olivia Palermo, goes to work at ELLE Magazine. Whitney's old friend, Roxy, moves in with her and gets a job at People's Revolution, while Olivia has met her match, Erin K., at her new job. The second half focused more on the fashion world drama, instead of relationship drama. The road to Whitney's official launch of her clothing line "Whitney Eve" release was the main plot in this half of the season. The ratings increased in the second half with the premiere episode being viewed by 2 million people and the series was picked up for a full second season run in December 2009.

== Cast ==
The following is a full list of cast members from the first season.

=== Season 1, Part 1 ===
- Main Cast Member
- Secondary Cast Member

| Name | Information |
|---|---|
| Whitney Port | A stylist working for fashion designer Diane von Fürstenberg. Also starred in The Hills. |
| Jay Lyon | An Australian musician and Port's current boyfriend. |
| Erin Lucas | The daughter of AC/DC bassist, Cliff Williams and one of Port's good friends. |
| Adam Senn | A male model, Jay's former roommate, a restaurant owner and Allie's on and off boyfriend. |
| Olivia Palermo | A New York socialite and Port's new acquaintance and colleague at Diane von Fürstenberg. |
| Samantha Swetra | An assistant buyer at Bergdorf Goodman and one of Port's good friends. |
| Allie Crandell | A model and Adam's current on and off girlfriend. |
| Duncan Davies | A musician from Canada and Lucas' former boyfriend. |
| Nevan Donahue | Palermo's cousin and current roommate. |
| Alex Smith | A male model and Port's former crush. |
| Alixe Boyer | Vice President and Global Image Director at Diane von Fürstenberg. |
| Emese Szenasy | Director of Public Relations at DVF. |
| Elizabeth Luby | Whitney and Olivia's co-worker at DVF. |
| Kelly Cutrone | Founder of People's Revolution. Mentor to Port and former boss. |
| JR | Lucas' former (high school) boyfriend. |
| Diane von Furstenberg | Fashion designer. |

=== Mid-Season Changes ===
Instead of ordering a complete 2nd season for The City MTV ordered 10 extra episodes to Season 1. Therefore, the so-called Season 2, is in fact Season 1, Part 2. Whitney quit DVF and went back to work for Kelly Cutrone at People's Revolution. Jay is no longer a part of the series, now that his relationship with Whitney is officially over. Olivia left her job at DVF, for Elle Magazine. Erin got into a public fight with ex Duncan, and is single. Erin quit the series, as well as Jay. And according to Allie's official Twitter page, she stated that she and Adam haven't been filming, so she doubts that they were going to be on the new season. Since the three leads left the theme opening sequence was cut down to a few scenes of New York and a final shot of Whitney.

=== Season 1, Part 2 ===
- Main Cast Member
- Secondary Cast Member

| Name | Information |
|---|---|
| Whitney Port | A stylist working for Kelly Cutrone. Also starred in The Hills. |
| Olivia Palermo | A New York socialite, Ports friend and former co-worker who works at Elle (magazine). |
| Roxy Olin | One of Port's good friends, and co-worker (daughter of Ken Olin). |
| Erin Kaplan | Palermo's new co-worker at Elle (magazine). |
| Samantha Swetra | An assistant buyer at Bergdorf Goodman and one of Port's good friends. |
| Joe Zee | Erin and Olivia's boss at Elle (magazine). |
| Kelly Cutrone | Whitney and Roxy's boss at People's Revolution. |
| Allie Crandell | A model and one of Port's good friends. |
| Jay Lyon | An Australian musician and Port's ex-boyfriend. (regular eps. 1-13) |
| Adam Senn | A male model, Jay's roommate, a restaurant owner and Allie's on/off boyfriend. (regular eps. 1-13) |
| Bryn Poulos | Palermo & Kaplan's friend and co-worker at Elle (magazine). |
| Freddie Fackelmayer | Samantha's "pal". |
| Harry Fackelmayer | Freddie's brother. |
| Zac | Roxy's "fling". |

== Episodes ==
| No. overall | No. in season | Title | Original release date |
|---|---|---|---|
Part 1
| 1 | 1 | "If She Can Make It Here..." | December 29, 2008 |
Whitney starts her new job at Diane von Furstenberg. Her first week promises to be a busy one considering it's Fashion Week, but she's still able to make time for fun: a date with Jay and a dinner party at Olivia's. Initially Jay says he does not want to attend the dinner party at Olivia's, but later shows up as a surprise to Whitney. However, Olivia is upset when Whitney, Jay, and Erin leave her dinner party early.
| 2 | 2 | "The Truth Will Reveal Itself" | December 29, 2008 |
When Alex resurfaces in Whitney's life he brings much drama along with him, claiming that he has heard a rumor that Jay spent the night with his ex. After Alex and Jay almost get into a fight at a club Whitney is left not knowing whom to trust.
| 3 | 3 | "The L Word" | January 5, 2009 |
When Erin's new boyfriend comes to visit, Whitney decides it's time to find her own apartment. Although Jay helps her find an apartment, Whitney feels like she's getting mixed signals and decides to ask him directly where she stands. Note: Adam does not appear in this episode.
| 4 | 4 | "Good Things Come in Threes" | January 12, 2009 |
Whitney's date with a new guy makes Jay jealous and leads him to confess his true feelings, leading to them becoming an official couple. Erin thinks things are moving too fast with Duncan when he suggests moving in.
| 5 | 5 | "Boys Night Out" | January 19, 2009 |
Adam finds himself in hot water with Allie when she hears that he kissed another girl. Adam denies all the rumors, but Allie is unsure if she can trust him. Olivia reluctantly agrees to let Nevan crash on her couch.
| 6 | 6 | "He Never Said He Had a Girlfriend" | January 26, 2009 |
Allie breaks down after a run-in with the girl who claims she kissed Adam. Whitney gets upset with Jay for taking Adam's side. Allie decides to forgive Adam and they get back together.
| 7 | 7 | "The Truth Hurts" | February 2, 2009 |
Kelly Cutrone accuses Allie of being too skinny, and Whitney finds herself caught in the middle. When Kelly shows up at a party hosted by Allie's agency she again calls her too skinny and Allie is even more upset. Erin runs into an ex-boyfriend, JR, and old feelings begin to return.
| 8 | 8 | "Mingling with the Commoners" | February 9, 2009 |
Whitney, Erin, and Olivia go to a concert of Jay's together, but Olivia accidentally makes them late. As an apology Olivia invites Jay's band to perform at a charity event but when Nevan openly makes fun of Jay's band the plan backfires, leaving Whitney and Olivia at odds. Meanwhile, Erin's new relationship is threatened by her renewed feelings for her ex-boyfriend.
| 9 | 9 | "Unexpected Roommates" | February 16, 2009 |
When Adam kicks Jay out of his apartment, Jay asks Whitney if he can stay with her. Plus, Erin's plan to juggle two guys backfires when Duncan and J.R. meet face-to-face.
| 10 | 10 | "The Past Catches Up" | February 23, 2009 |
The crew heads down to Miami for a trip. Whitney's run-in with Jay's ex-girlfriend Danielle causes her to second guess trusting Jay. Allie considers moving out after hearing about Adam's trip to Miami. Note: Olivia does not appear in this episode.
| 11 | 11 | "Fool Me Twice, Shame on Me" | March 2, 2009 |
Whitney is crushed when she discovers that Jay's mysterious night out was spent with his ex-girlfriend. Olivia steals the credit from Whitney when they style an ELLE cover shoot and Allie moves in with Erin.
| 12 | 12 | "I'm Sorry, Whit" | March 9, 2009 |
Tamarama's upcoming tour forces Jay and Whitney to determine the future of their relationship. While Whitney picks up the slack when Olivia is unprepared for a big meeting at work. Note: Erin Lucas does not appear in this episode.
| 13 | 13 | "I Lost Myself in Us" | March 16, 2009 |
Mid-season finale. Whitney questions her life in New York City as she struggles with her break-up and competes with Olivia for new responsibilities at DVF. Note: This mid-season finale marks the final appearance of Erin Lucas, as well as Jay and Adam as main cast members, with the latter two making guest appearances later in the season. Guest: Lauren Conrad
Part 2
| 14 | 14 | "Sleeping with the Frenemy" | September 29, 2009 |
Whitney's friend Roxy moves in and throws a wild party. Olivia starts a new job in the accessories department at ELLE Magazine, but meets her match in co-worker Erin Kaplan. Note: This episode marks the first appearance of Erin Kaplan and Roxy.
| 15 | 15 | "Working Girls" | October 6, 2009 |
Olivia wins Joe Zee's approval on a new project at ELLE, but Erin seems to be tougher to please. Meanwhile, Whitney questions if working with her friend is a good idea when Roxy steps out of line on her first day on the job.
| 16 | 16 | "It's All Who You Know" | October 13, 2009 |
Olivia shocks Erin by succeeding at her biggest assignment yet for ELLE. Meanwhile, Whitney goes behind Kelly Cutrone's back when she shows her designs to Bergdorf Goodman.
| 17 | 17 | "Meet the Fackelmayers" | October 20, 2009 |
Olivia thrives at an ELLE party, but Erin reminds her that the fashion business isn't just about who you know. Whitney reenters the dating scene when she meets a cute new guy.
| 18 | 18 | "Hit It and Quit It" | October 27, 2009 |
Whitney and Freddie's date sprouts a third wheel when he brings his dad along. Roxy learns firsthand what it's like to work with Olivia when People's Revolution and ELLE put on a party.
| 19 | 19 | "Weekend at Freddie's" | November 3, 2009 |
Erin has to pick up the slack when Olivia drops the ball on a big interview assignment for ELLE. Plus, Whitney finds out a shady secret about Freddie from his own brother.
| 20 | 20 | "Friends and Foe-Workers" | November 10, 2009 |
Roxy and Whitney get into an argument while on the job at Miami Fashion Week, and Kelly wonders if the girls should work together. Meanwhile, Joe Zee lectures Erin for not helping Olivia when she fails a task for ELLE.
| 21 | 21 | "Forget About Boys" | November 17, 2009 |
Olivia gets praise from Joe at an ELLE photo shoot, but Erin is frustrated about the preferential treatment. Meanwhile, Whitney and Roxy go on a series of disastrous dates, ending in a blowup at a night club.
| 22 | 22 | "If You Want Something Done Right..." | November 24, 2009 |
Erin and Olivia get into their biggest fight yet when Olivia comes up short on a new assignment, and Roxy makes a mess of things at Whitney's look book photo shoot.
| 23 | 23 | "Everything on the Line" | December 1, 2009 |
Olivia and Erin's relationship reaches new heights on ELLE's 'Today Show' segment. Meanwhile, Whitney puts her career on the line when she pitches her collection to Bergdorf Goodman.
