= The City season 2 =

The City
- Season 2
- No. of episodes: 12

Release
- Original network: MTV
- Original release: April 27 – July 13, 2010

Season chronology
- ← Previous; Season 1

The second and final season of The City began airing on April 27, 2010. Filming for the season had been in production since January 2010, and later wrapped the following June.

== Cast ==
Season 2

- Main Cast Member
- Secondary Cast Member

Name	Information
Whitney Port	A stylist working for Kelly Cutrone, and an aspiring fashion designer. Former cast member on The Hills.
Olivia Palermo	A New York socialite, Whitney's former co-worker who works at Elle. She is also the face of ELLE.com
Roxy Olin	Whitney's good friend and co-worker (daughter of Ken Olin).
Erin Kaplan	Olivia's co-worker and rival at Elle.
Kelly Cutrone	Whitney and Roxy's boss at People's Revolution.
Joe Zee	Erin and Olivia's boss at Elle.
Samantha Swetra	An assistant buyer at Bergdorf Goodman and one of Whitney's friends.
Zach Hyman	Roxy's love interest.
Seth Plattner	Robbie's assistant, Erin & Olivia's co-worker.
Louise Roe	Olivia & Erin's co-worker.

== Episodes ==
No. overall	No. in season	Title	Original release date	U.S. viewers (millions)
24	1	"Show Em' What You Got"	April 27, 2010	1.964
Olivia gets promoted to be the new face of ELLE.com. Meanwhile, Whitney gets a once in lifetime chance to show her line at New York Fashion Week when one of Kelly's designers drops out.
25	2	"Friends In High Places"	May 4, 2010	1.519
Whitney has no time to rest after her first big fashion show, when Kelly pushes her to market her line. Olivia however, refuses to support Whitney Eve at ELLE Magazine.
26	3	"Professionally Dangerous"	May 11, 2010	1.681
Roxy has a date-like meeting with Zach. Meanwhile, Whitney and Olivia go head-to-head after Olivia decides to interview her friend for ELLE, instead of covering Whitney's line.
27	4	"Queen of Diamonds"	May 18, 2010	1.617
Olivia and Erin have very different ideas of how to dress Fergie for an ELLE cover shoot, leaving Joe Zee in the middle. A French photographer shows an interest in Whitney, but she's torn when he wants to take the relationship to the next level.
28	5	"The Belle of Elle"	May 25, 2010	1.441
Whitney doesn't follow Kelly's advice and brings Roxy along to a Glamour magazine shoot, and it almost ends in disaster. Erin and Olivia compete to be featured in New York's biggest gossip column.
29	6	"Fashion with a Capital F"	June 1, 2010	1.812
Roxy ignores Kelly's instructions when she pitches Whitney's collection at an event for another designer. Plus, Olivia ignores a work request of her own.
30	7	"The British Are Coming"	June 8, 2010	1.474
Olivia's job is in jeopardy, Roxy impresses Kelly at work, and Whitney pursues new business opportunities.
31	8	"Work Horses and Show Ponies"	June 15, 2010	N/A
Roxy and Whitney put on a runway show in Miami for Whitney Eve without Kelly's help. Olivia promises to come through at work on a big interview.
32	9	"One Girl's Trash..."	June 22, 2010	N/A
Whitney pushes her line to fashion trade show buyers and blames Roxy for a failed sale.
33	10	"Stage Fight"	June 29, 2010	1.319
Roxy and Whitney's relationship is put to the test over a failed styling job. Olivia helps Erin pull looks for an ELLE segment on 'The Martha Stewart Show.'
34	11	"Roommate Wanted"	July 6, 2010	1.556
Tensions rise between Roxy and Whitney and it forces Roxy to search for a new home.
35	12	"Lost In Translation"	July 13, 2010	2.326
In the series finale, Whitney struggles between furthering her business and her loyalties to Kelly. Meanwhile, Olivia's trip to Japan is a big hit with ELLE, much to Erin's chagrin.
