= Robyn Berkley =

American fashion designer

Robyn Berkley is the founder of lifestyle brand and wellness website Live The Process and the brand consulting company, RBBR. She has worked as a fashion publicist based in New York City, written for The Huffington Post and appeared as herself in the television series Kell on Earth.

== Life and career ==
Berkley graduated from university in May 1999 with a degree in communications. Her first job, beginning in June 1999, was at New York public relations firm LaForce & Stevens, as an assistant. Aged 24, she was recruited by Johan Lindeberg as head of PR for North America for J. Lindeberg. Here she met Kelly Cutrone who, four years later, hired her as fashion director at People's Revolution, of which after seven years she became a partner.

In May 2011, New York announced that Berkley was leaving People's Revolution to take a yoga teacher-training course in Bali to become a certified yoga instructor. Having completed the six-week course, in late 2011 she launched Live The Process and her own consulting company, RBBR. Live The Process is described as "an online wellness community for impossibly busy people". RBBR represents a roster of brands that reflect Berkley's "balanced approach to business".

== Huffington Post ==
Between July 2010 and January 2011 Berkley blogged at The Huffington Post on relationship difficulties for thirty-something career women in New York City.

== Kell on Earth ==
Kell on Earth, a reality TV show, ran February 1, 2010 – March 29, 2010 over eight episodes, and featured Berkley as a senior member of the People's Revolution staff. Berkley starred in the first two episodes.

== David Lynch Collection ==
Berkley's "David Lynch Collection" clothing line, described as "a range of luxury meditation-ready pieces", was launched in association with the David Lynch Foundation. The name of the collection caused some news outlets to report that Lynch was the collection's designer. Alyssa Miller, who modelled the collection, said of the design process, "Robyn was looking for someone who ... was familiar with the David Lynch Foundation ... so we decided to meet and everything just naturally fell into place from there." InStyle called the line "a surprising success" and reported an "enormous amount of interest", with the product quickly selling out online.

== Personal life ==
Prior to resigning her position at People's Revolution, Berkley reported on the confusions and disruptions in her personal life. Of her subsequent meditation practice, she has written, "The single most effective tool that I have introduced into my life to reduce stress and create balance is the practice of Transcendental Meditation."
