= Alyssa Miller =

American model

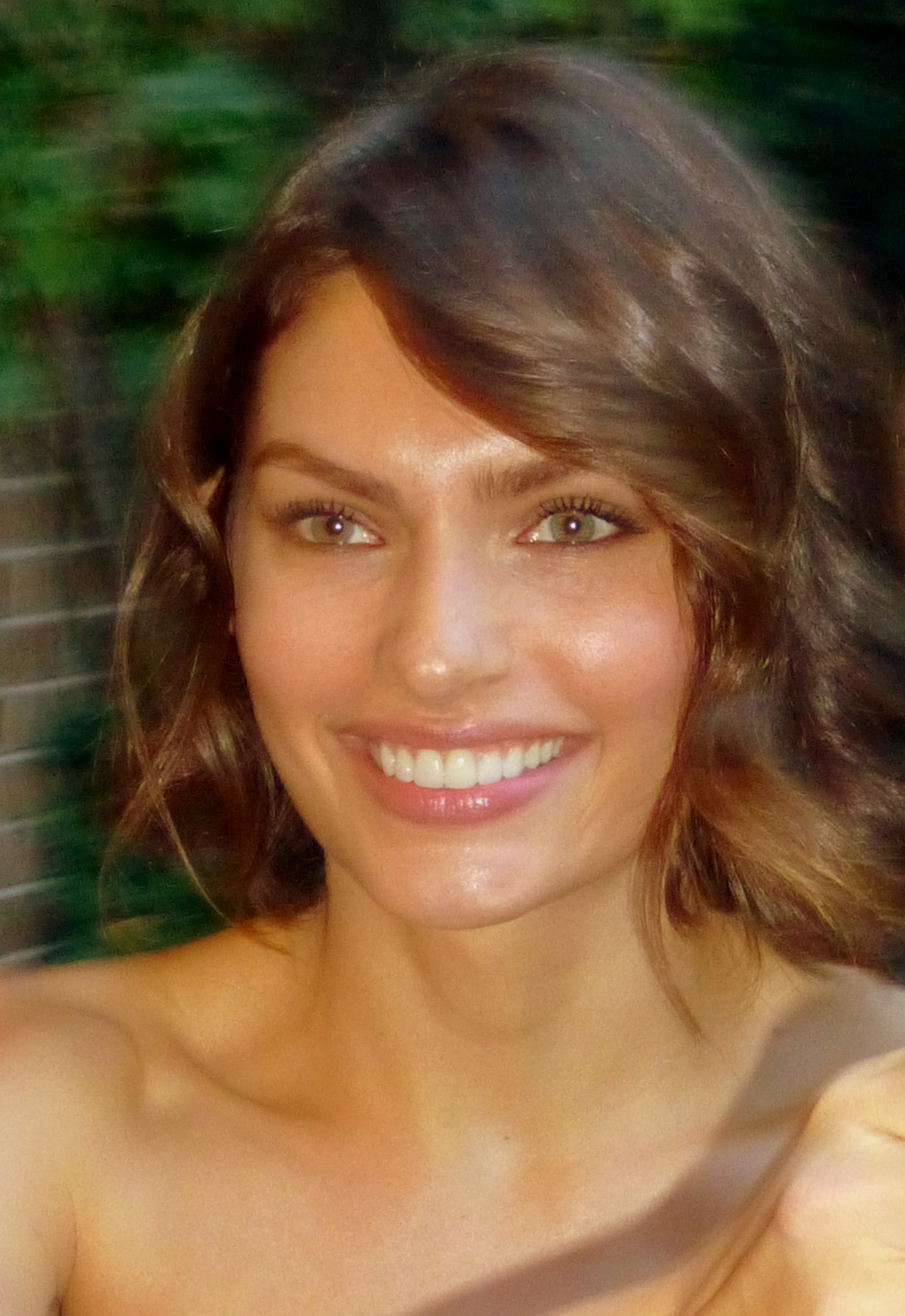
- Miller at the 2013 Toronto International Film Festival
- Born: Alyssa Elaine Miller; July 4, 1989 (age 37); Los Angeles, California, U.S.
- Years active: 2005–present
- Spouse: Cam Avery (m. 2018; div. 2018)
- Modeling information
- Height: 1.75 m (5 ft 9 in)
- Hair color: Brown (natural)
- Eye color: Hazel
- Agency: Select Model Management (London); Uno Models (Barcelona); Unique Models (Copenhagen); Freedom Models (Los Angeles); Freedom Models (Miami); Stockholmsgruppen (Stockholm); Chic Management (Sydney); Elite Model Management (Toronto)

Alyssa Elaine Miller (born July 4, 1989) is an American model. She has done print and runway work for numerous leading companies. Among her highlights are cover appearances for Vogue (Germany) and Elle (Italy), work as a featured model–spokesperson for Guess, and appearances in the Sports Illustrated Swimsuit Issue.

== Early life and description ==
Miller was born in Los Angeles, California, to father Craig Miller. She has several siblings. Her ancestry includes German, Austrian, English, Irish, Scottish and Welsh. She grew up in Palmdale, Los Angeles County.

Miller is known for her dark brown hair, full eyebrows and bone structure. She is considered to have a very European look. Guess founder Paul Marciano said, "Alyssa is the most European-looking American girl I've ever seen!" When she had her breakthrough with Guess, she drew comparisons to Sophia Loren and Brooke Shields and was regarded as something of a throwback.

== Career ==
In 2003, her father sent test photos to a Los Angeles office of IMG Models. By 2005 she was an up-and-coming model with the Marilyn NY agency. She did a 2005 fall campaign for Stella McCartney at the age of 16. By February 2006, she had been featured in each of the major editions of Vogue, including the cover of a Vogue Italia supplement. Following cover appearances for the October 2006 German Vogue and the July 2010 Italian Elle (she also later appeared on the October 2012 cover), she became one of the new faces of Guess clothing in late 2010. Miller has also done work for Victoria's Secret. Other ad work has included Bebe, Billabong, Chopard, Diesel, Elie Tahari, Intimissimi, Juicy Couture, La Perla, Laura Biagiotti and Tecovas (company).

She signed with Elite Model Management in 2011. She made her Sports Illustrated Swimsuit Issue debut in 2011 when she was one of five rookies (along with Shannan Click, Kenza Fourati, Izabel Goulart, and fellow Guess model Kate Upton) in the issue. According to a story in The Wall Street Journal she had previously thought that if she ever appeared in Sports Illustrated it would be for soccer, since given her athletic background she had envisioned herself as a professional soccer player. She also appeared in the body painting feature in the 2011 Swimsuit Issue where Joanne Gair painted her and Stewart Shining photographed her in New York City. 2013 was her third Swimsuit Issue. In both 2011 and 2013, Miller participated in the annual Sports Illustrated swimsuit edition of David Letterman's Top 10 on the Late Show with David Letterman on the night that the Swimsuit Issue cover model was announced.

In 2012 she became the muse of Blumarine Bellissima fragrance. Miller is a former victim of bullying, and she became an advocate against bullying and cyberbullying on May 1, 2013, along with Super Bowl XLVII champion Jameel McClain, by becoming a global ambassador for STOMP Out Bullying. In 2013, Miller signed with IMG soon after a first public appearance with Jake Gyllenhaal. She was featured in the 80th anniversary issue of Esquire as one of the 80 things that define our time. In December 2013, she appeared on the cover and in the 2014 Calendar Girl Issue of the fashion magazine Galore. Her images were augmented by the artwork of Claw Money who affixed his graphic cartoon paws to both black-and-white and color photographs of her as if they were gripping her while she was modelling.

In July 2014 Miller, together with fashion publicist Robyn Berkley, launched a meditation-wear collection for Berkley's line, Live the Process, with a percentage of sales to the David Lynch Foundation. Miller made a cameo appearance in the 2015 film Entourage. In August 2017, Miller designed a collaboration with Understated Leather. In April 2018, Miller launched her own line of leather handbags, luggages, and travel accessories called Pilgrim.

== Personal life ==
Miller's fitness regimen includes ballet and running; she practices Transcendental Meditation. She has taken both acting and improvisation classes. She briefly dated actor Jake Gyllenhaal in 2013.

Miller married musician Cam Avery in April 2018. On November 29, 2018 Miller confirmed via her Instagram account she and Avery had separated. From late 2021 to early 2022 she was romantically linked to Andrew Garfield.
