= Utah & Ether =

American graffiti artist duo

Utah & Ether MUL
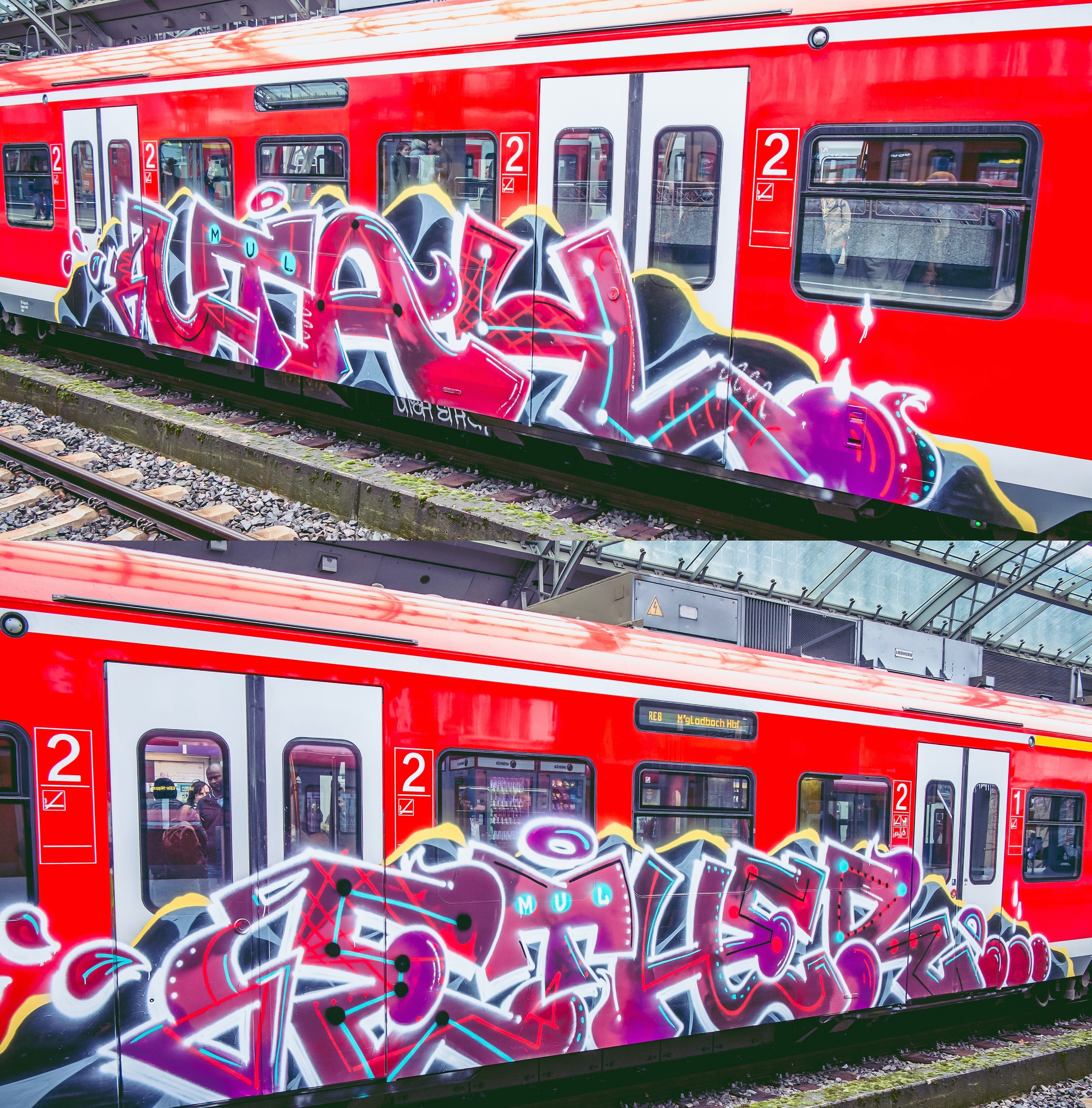
- Colorful Utah and Ether graffiti pieces on an RE 8 in Cologne, 2018
- Born: Danielle E. Bremner; 16 February 1982 (age 44); Bayside, Queens, US Jim Clay Harper VI; 18 January 1985 (age 41); Wilmette, Illinois, US
- Education: York University; Fashion Institute of Technology; Bowling Green State University
- Known for: Global interrailing
- Style: Train writing
- Movement: Graffiti
- Criminal charges: Vandalism
- Criminal penalty: Imprisoned, Rikers Island Imprisoned, Rikers Island and Port Phillip Prison
- Website: utahether.com

Danielle E. "Utah" Bremner and Jim Clay "Ether" Harper VI are American graffiti artists, dubbed the "Bonnie and Clyde of the graffiti world". They have tagged trains and buildings in over 30 countries on five continents, and have made books and videos about their exploits. They have also been arrested, fined, and served multiple prison sentences for vandalism. Their use of social media has been used as an example in a book about graffiti artists, and they have been the subjects of a video exhibit and a song.

== Early lives ==
Danielle E. Bremner was born on February 16, 1982 in Bayside, Queens. Her mother worked as a Bayside high school teacher, and her father as a New York City policeman. She says she grew up around graffiti as part of the New York City landscape.

Jim Clay Harper VI was born on January 18, 1985, in Wilmette, Illinois, near Chicago. He had two brothers and one sister; their father, Jim Clay Harper V, who worked as a stockbroker at Morgan Stanley, died in 2004. He says he grew up across from the Linden Yard and would observe the nightly graffiti on the cars. Harper posted abstract art on web sites, including one with graffiti tags. In 2001, Harper used the alias "Merlin", and said he had one year experience in graphic design and two in Web design. He started doing graffiti while a student at Bowling Green State University in Ohio. He became part of the MUL ("Made You Look") graffiti crew, based in Chicago but including members in several states. He used the graffiti tag "Ether".

Bremner met Harper in 2005, through a mutual friend, after she temporarily moved to Chicago in 2004. Both were already known in the graffiti community. They met up in Chicago for a trip to St. Louis to paint the MetroLink system. Soon, the two would meet regularly for graffiti excursions across the US, sleeping in Bremner's car. Both often tagged as part of MUL. According to the Suffolk County, Massachusetts District Attorney's office, Harper left his tags, "Ether", and "MUL", on MBTA subway cars in Boston from June to October 2005.

In 2006, Bremner was a student at York University in Toronto, when she was arrested, twice, for graffiti, in association with a male student from the Ontario College of Art and Design. In May, the pair were arrested in Boston with 45 cans of spray paint, for painting graffiti on the side of multiple buildings. In June, they were arrested after a 100 metre/yard chase at Toronto's Davisville Yard, where they painted trains belonging to the Toronto Transit Commission. The arresting officer said that the mural at the Davisville Yard looked good: "It was very colourful, very well-defined, and not sloppy at all. It was well-planned art." She was convicted and paid restitution for both cases.

In 2008, Bremner was a student at New York's Fashion Institute of Technology. Newsday sources considered Bremner the most active female graffiti tagger in New York City and possibly the country. Her graffiti tags varied between "Utah", "Dani", and "Erin".

== European graffiti spree and imprisonment ==
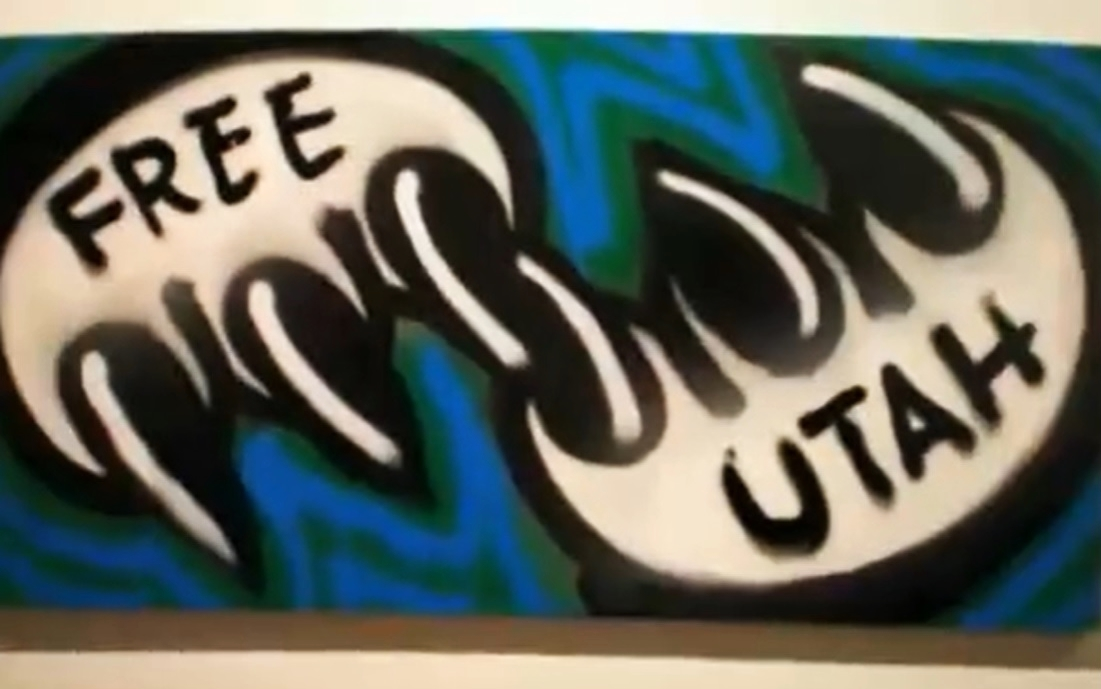
"FREE UTAH", graffiti art by Claw Money, exhibited in New York City, 2012

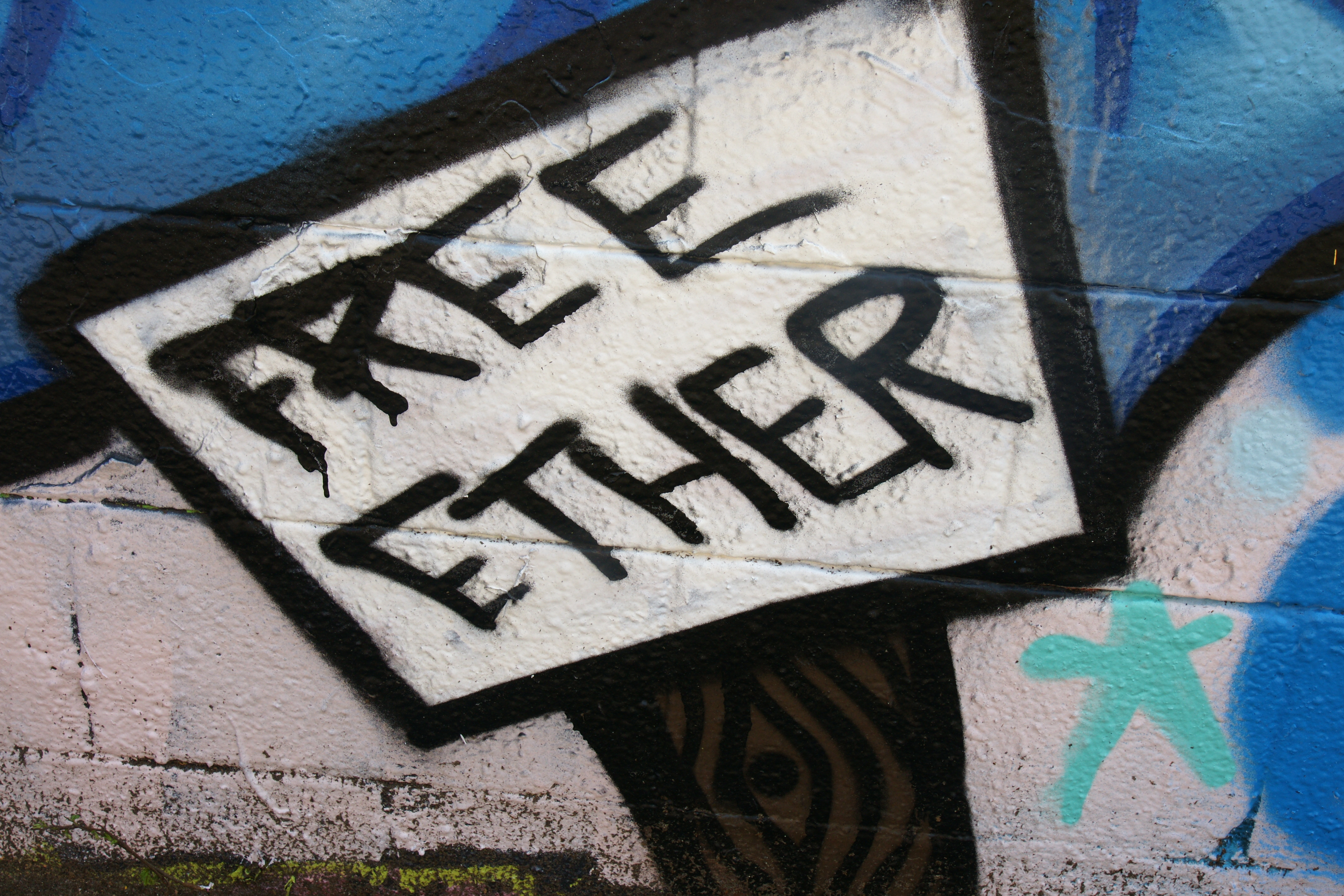
"FREE ETHER", graffiti in Hyde Park, Chicago, 2010

In May 2008, Bremner and Harper, now her boyfriend, went on a three month, multi-country "graffiti spree" across Europe. They put their graffiti tags, "Ether" and "Dani" or "Utah", on train cars in London, Madrid, Paris, Frankfurt, and Hamburg. In their absence, in July, police searched Bremner's Woodside, Queens, apartment and found over 450 cans of spray paint and both Polaroid and digital photographs of her tags on New York City Subway trains. When the pair returned to the United States in August, they were each arrested upon landing, Bremner in Chicago's O'Hare International Airport, and Harper at JFK International Airport in New York City. They faced charges for $100,000 in graffiti damages in four of the five boroughs of New York City, including subway yards in Harlem and Inwood, Manhattan, and 20 counts of vandalism in The Bronx. After this arrest, Newsday labelled them "the Bonnie and Clyde of the graffiti world", a sobriquet that would be later repeated by numerous other sources.

Bremner turned herself in to New York City authorities in April 2009, and in July was sentenced to six months in jail and a $10,000 fine for her New York City vandalism. She served her sentence on Rikers Island, about which she reported, via fellow graffiti artist turned fashion designer Claw Money, that it wasn't so bad, except for being unable to get enough food, being a vegan, until she wrote a letter threatening a lawsuit. After being released from Riker's Island, Bremner was further tried in September 2009 in Boston. There she pled guilty to 13 counts of vandalism and was sentenced to another six months incarceration, another five figures of restitution, a mental health evaluation, and five years of probation, supervised by New York authorities, during which she would be forbidden to return to Boston. Defense attorneys and graffiti artists considered the sentence harsh, especially in comparison to a two year probation sentence given in July to sticker artist Shepard Fairey, but prosecutors said that reflected the difficulty of removing paint graffiti as opposed to stickers.

Bremner was released in February 2010, and announced a web site, utahoner.com, where she would display her artwork, announce shows and events, and sell prints and gear. (Harper's similar website, first makeyoursoulburnslow.com, then ethermul.com, went online in November 2009.) In October 2010 she modeled for Claw Money's fashion line.

Harper served a six month sentence on Riker's Island in the spring of 2010, then was released and in July pled guilty to seven counts of vandalizing Boston MBTA trains in 2005. He was also sentenced to six months imprisonment, $10,000 restitution, and one year probation. When he was released in two months, both met with a reporter for The New Yorker. The conditions of their probation, forbidding them from even possessing paint or markers, "would be untenable", and they discussed seeking citizenship abroad.

== Probation Vacation ==
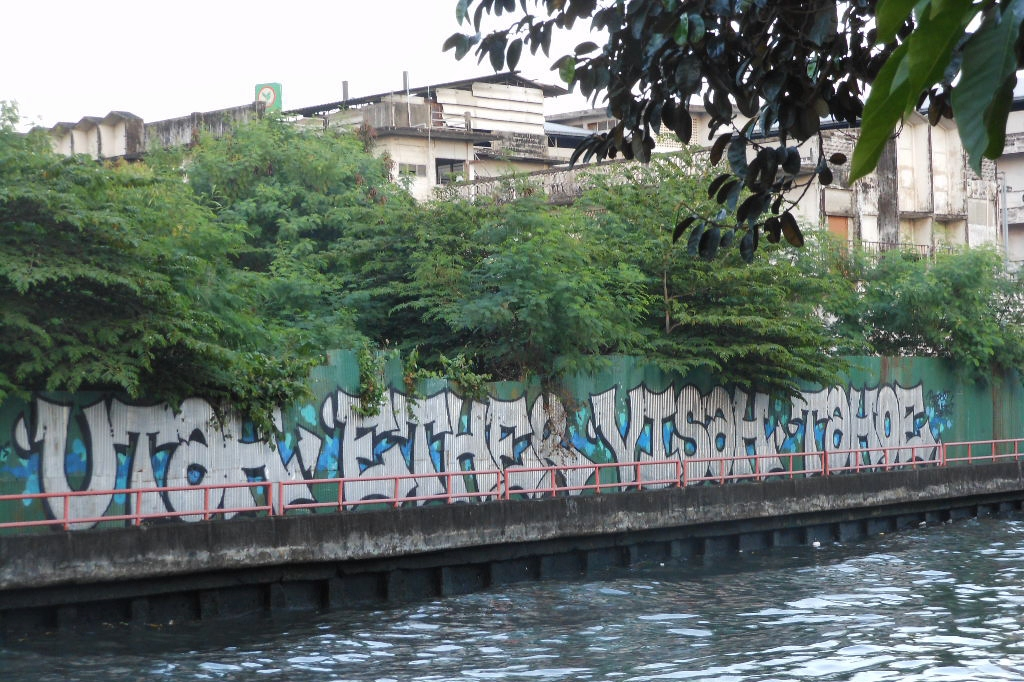
UTAH ETHER VISAH TAHOE, graffiti tags in Bangkok, 2012

In January 2011, Utah and Ether merged their websites into one, utahether.com. At the same time they used that website to release a limited edition 36 page book of photographs of their graffiti, called Probation Vacation. The book was also promoted in a live exhibition at Boston's Fourth Wall Project.

In May 2011, Utah and Ether broke their probation by leaving the United States to fly to India. Over the next five years, they left their graffiti tags in Israel, South Korea, Thailand, Tunisia, Japan, China, Georgia, Portugal, the Philippines, Singapore, Malaysia, India, Turkey, Chile, and Argentina, all documented with photos and videos on their website, Vimeo channel, and Instagram account. They were compiling their next book, Probation Vacation: Lost in Asia. Chapters in the series received tens of thousands of views on YouTube, their Instagram account had more than 125,000 followers in 2018, and their Facebook had some 25,000 followers. Their social media use served as an example in a 2020 book about graffiti artists.

One video showed them painting Hong Kong's MTR trains on what is believed to be three separate occasions, in 2011, 2012, and 2015, entering the depots after cutting through razor wire. The vandalism caused upgrades in fencing, patrols, and surveillance. Another showed breaking in and painting a Taiwan train at the Beitou depot near Fuxinggang metro station. Yet another video shows the pair cutting through wire fences and painting Singapore's SMRT Trains at Bishan Depot in August 2011 with the words "Jet Setters". The book further explained that they staked out the depot overnight, and noted the staff going home at 1:30 am. This was only the second time the SMRT had ever been painted. The vandalism drew Singaporean news coverage, and cost a $200,000 fine for SMRT Corporation that year, but its perpetrators and method were not known until the video and book were released in 2016.

In 2012, Finnish artist Sauli Sirviö made a video documentary, Never Going Home, about Utah's and Ether's endless journey, focusing on their 2011 Japan exploits. It was exhibited 2012-2018 in Finland, Italy, and the Netherlands. An exhibition of Utah's and Ether's art was displayed at the Galleria Pavesi in Milan, Italy, in February 2014, but the pair sent their work without showing up in person, presumably fearing legal trouble. They had painted trains in Milan in 2013. In 2018, Utah, Ether, and accomplice Good Guy Boris received a one year and three months suspended sentence for that 2013 vandalism by a Milan court.

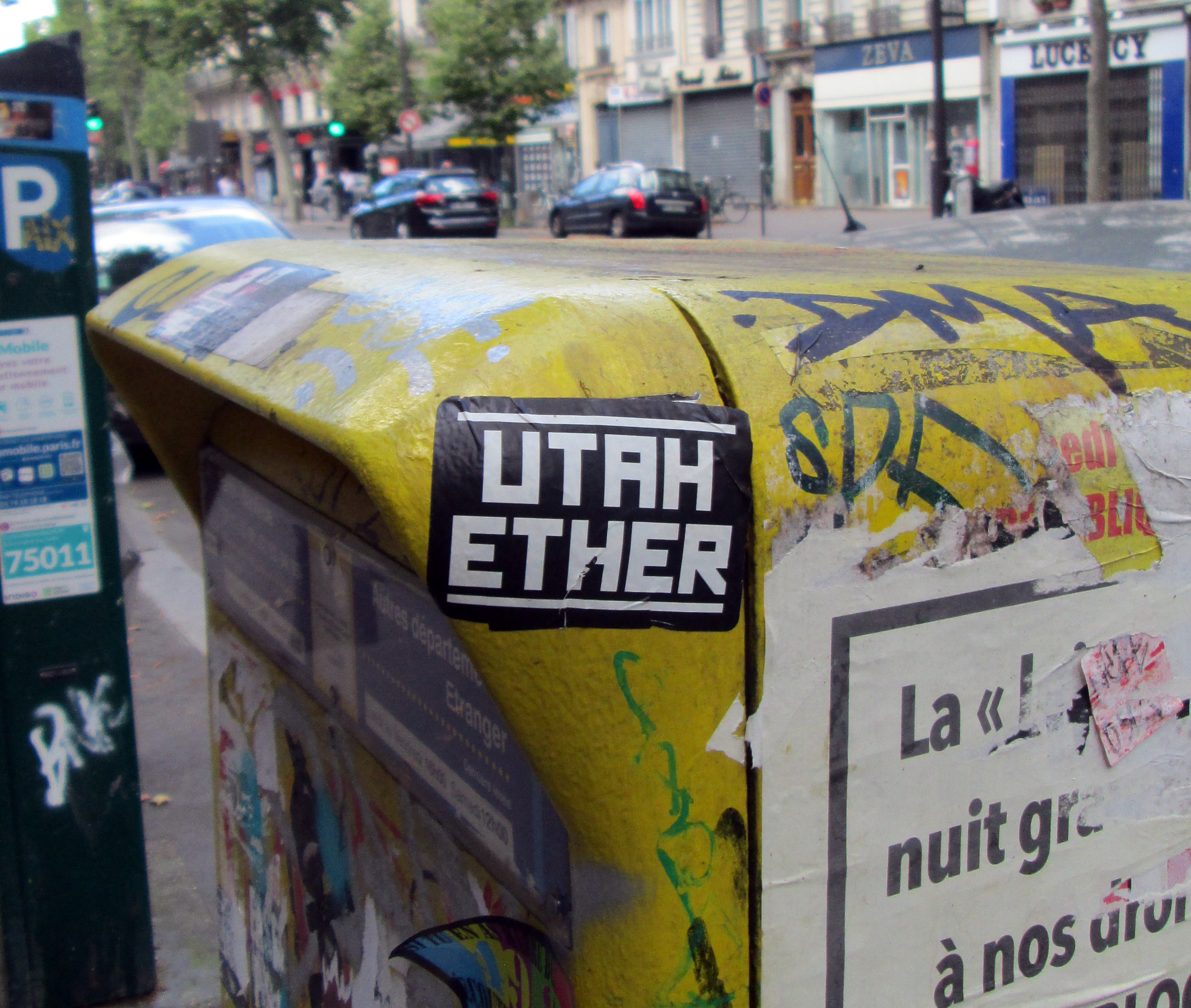
UTAH ETHER sticker in the style of their website, Paris, 2016

From 2011 to 2016, Utah and Ether had left graffiti on trains and walls in more than 30 countries in Africa, Europe and Asia. In April 2016, Utah and Ether flew in to Melbourne from the United Arab Emirates, and within days began to create graffiti murals. On May 4, Ether, with an Australian graffiti artist going by Nokier, were seen putting graffiti stickers on shop fronts on Brunswick Street, Melbourne by a single father from Fitzroy, Victoria. The man asked them to stop, and filmed their actions with a mobile phone, which the pair then tried to take away from him. In the struggle, the phone pocket-dialed the man's sister, who called police. When police arrived, Ether was in a headlock, but Nokier got away. Ether was found with a knife, and charged with multiple counts related to the assault, vandalism of the Brunswick Street shops, and of trains in four Melbourne suburbs. On May 31, he was jailed for six months. Police had staked out Melbourne Airport for Utah and Nokier, who had checked in for a flight departing there on May 30, but the two instead flew from Brisbane to Hong Kong.

In a July interview about Ether's imprisonment, Utah said: "... neither of us is dependent on the other in any aspect of life, graffiti included. It’s really not the end of the world... You come out of jail and you get on with your life." Ether served his time in Port Phillip Prison. He was deported to the United States when released in 2017, with the expectation that he would be imprisoned for violating probation, but he was not arrested, and was instead again able to leave the country. In a magazine published through their website, he wrote that in prison he had made and sold shivs, and observed the killing of gangland figure Hizir Ferman by prison officials.

Probation Vacation: Lost in Asia was released as a limited edition book and series of 12 freely available videos in May 2016, after Ether's arrest. It covered 11 countries and 37 cities. In an interview about the work, Utah said, "The illegality of what we do is more appealing and important than the art itself... some of my favorite experiences with graffiti, some of our best photos and footage and memories don't even involve actual painting but more so the action surrounding it." Ether said "I like to look at the way we live our lives as art. The series that we work on ... are simply an extension of that."

The pair were the subject of the eponymous song, "Utah & Ether", by Finnish band Pystyyn Kuolleet Hipit, in 2019.
