= Genuine Ken =

American television series

Genuine Ken: The Search for the Great American Boyfriend is a 2011 reality TV game show hosted by former MTV's The Hills and The City cast member Whitney Port where 8 male contestants compete to become "The Great American Boyfriend." The TV show's first season had Whitney Port and Lauren Bruksch (director of Barbie Marketing) as permanent judges and a different guest judge each week.

The reality game show aired on Hulu.
