= Johan Lindeberg =

Swedish fashion designer

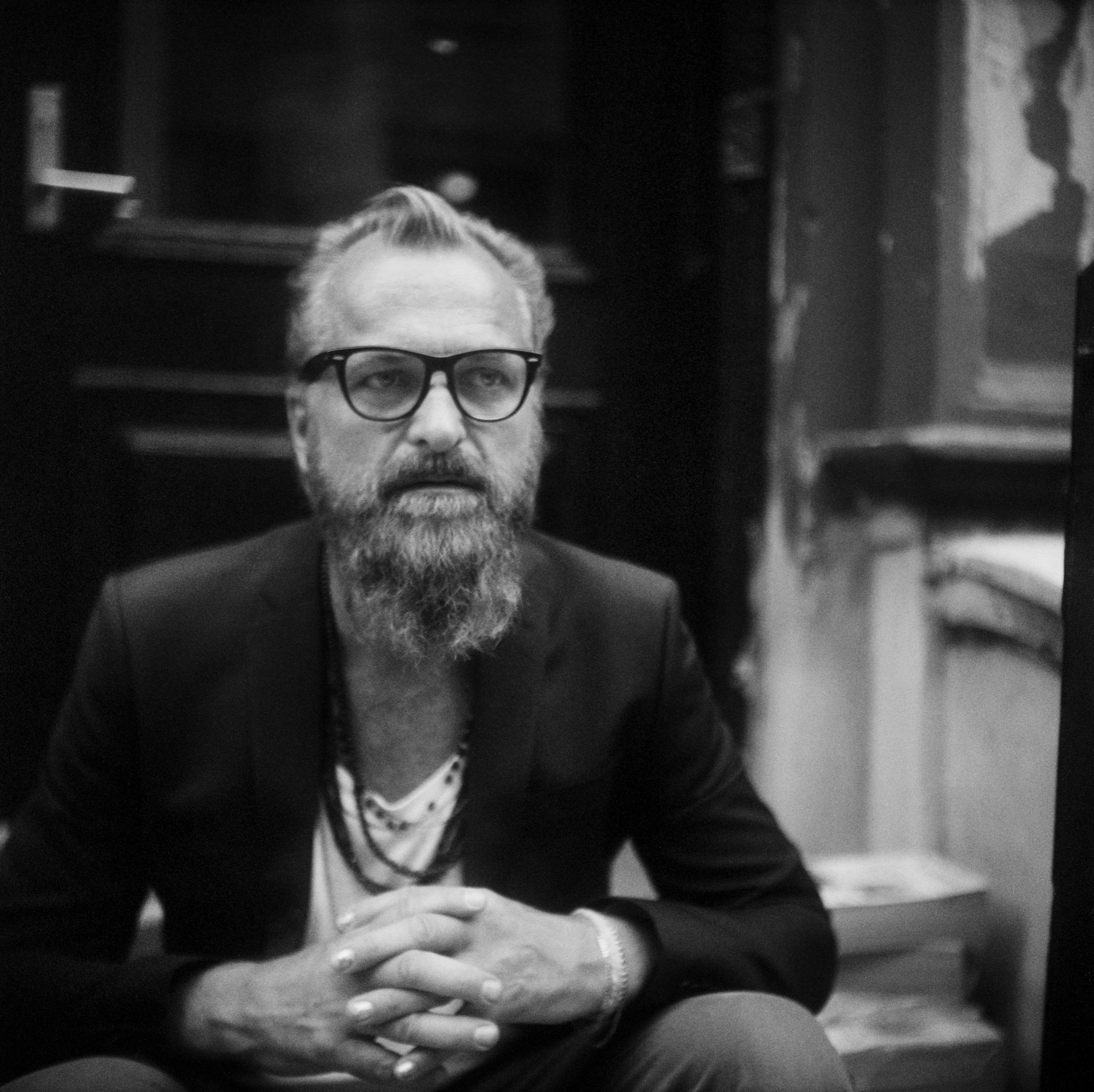
- Born: 1957 (age 68–69); Lund, Sweden
- Occupations: Fashion Designer; photographer
- Labels: J.Lindeberg (1996– ); Diesel (1990–1996); Paris68 (2007–2009); William Rast (2007–2009); BLK DNM (2010–2015)
- Website: johanlindeberg.com

Johan Lindeberg (born 1957) is a Swedish fashion designer.

== Life and career ==
He was born in 1957 in Lund, Sweden. He attended business school in Gothenburg.

He was the Marketing Director of Diesel from 1990 until 1996. He was the CEO of Diesel US from 1994 to 1996. In 1996, Lindeberg founded his own company J. Lindeberg, which is credited with introducing fashionable style into golf wear. He was the Creative Director until 2007. Johan moved to New York City to take on the Creative Director positions at Justin Timberlake's fashion brand William Rast, where he worked until 2009. Lindeberg left William Rast in 2009 to create a new lifestyle brand, Paris68. The same year, he served as a host for the Swedish radio program Sommar. During the programme, he announced he would be leaving J. Lindeberg.

In 2010 he joined forces with Kellwood Company as Creative Director of BLK DNM. In 2015 Lindeberg departed from BLK DNM to return to his namesake brand, J.Lindeberg, as Creative Director. In 2023, BLK DNM was acquired by the Swedish blockchain company Chromaway, citing opportunities to inform consumers about the clothing's supply chain.
