= Kell on Earth =

American reality television series

- Genre: Reality television
- Starring: Kelly Cutrone
- Country of origin: United States
- Original language: English
- No. of seasons: 1
- No. of episodes: 8

Production
- Executive producers: Billy Taylor; Dan Cutforth; Jane Lipsitz; Kelly Cutrone
- Producer: Magical Elves Productions
- Running time: 44 minutes

Original release
- Network: Bravo
- Release: February 1 – March 29, 2010

Kell on Earth is an American reality television series starring Kelly Cutrone, the founder of the public relations, branding and marketing firm People's Revolution. The series premiered on February 1, 2010, on the Bravo cable network and cancelled after one season.

The first season averaged 574,000 viewers. The show did not return for a second season.

== Synopsis ==
The series follows the life of Kelly Cutrone as she balances running her fashion PR company, People's Revolution, juggling Fashion Weeks in New York and London with being a single mother.

== Additional cast ==
- Robyn Berkley
- Emily Bungert
- Stefanie Skinner
- Andrew Mukamal

== Episodes ==
Episode number	Episode title	Original air date	Clients featured	U.S. viewers
1	"Walk in the Park"	February 1, 2010	David Delfin and Chado Ralph Rucci	226,000
2	"The Show Must Go On"	February 8, 2010	Genetic Denim	560,000
3	"Highway to Kell"	February 15, 2010	Nicolas Petrou and Agent Provocateur	372,000
4	"Off to London"	February 22, 2010	Alternative Apparel and Henry Holland	592,000
5	"Love Hangover"	March 8, 2010	Jeremy Scott and Ina Bernstein	566,000
6	"Skinner's Boiling Point"	March 15, 2010	Xeniya	499,000
7	"Tough Times"	March 22, 2010	David Codikow	676,000
8	"Sunny Days"	March 29, 2010	DKNY	756,000
