= List of The City (2008 TV series) episodes =

The following is a list of episodes for the American reality series, The City.

== Series overview ==
Season	Episodes		Originally released	
Season	Episodes		First released	Last released
1	23	13	December 29, 2008	March 16, 2009
1	23	10	September 29, 2009	December 1, 2009
2	12		April 27, 2010	July 13, 2010

== Episodes ==
=== Season 1 (2008–09) ===
No. overall	No. in season	Title	Original release date
Part 1
1	1	"If She Can Make It Here..."	December 29, 2008
2	2	"The Truth Will Reveal Itself"	December 29, 2008
3	3	"The L Word"	January 5, 2009
4	4	"Good Things Come in Threes"	January 12, 2009
5	5	"Boys Night Out"	January 19, 2009
6	6	"He Never Said He Had a Girlfriend"	January 26, 2009
7	7	"The Truth Hurts"	February 2, 2009
8	8	"Mingling with the Commoners"	February 9, 2009
9	9	"Unexpected Roommates"	February 16, 2009
10	10	"The Past Catches Up"	February 23, 2009
11	11	"Fool Me Twice, Shame on Me"	March 2, 2009
12	12	"I'm Sorry, Whit"	March 9, 2009
13	13	"I Lost Myself in Us"	March 16, 2009
Part 2
14	14	"Sleeping with the Frenemy"	September 29, 2009
15	15	"Working Girls"	October 6, 2009
16	16	"It's All Who You Know"	October 13, 2009
17	17	"Meet the Fackelmayers"	October 20, 2009
18	18	"Hit It and Quit It"	October 27, 2009
19	19	"Weekend at Freddie's"	November 3, 2009
20	20	"Friends and Foe-Workers"	November 10, 2009
21	21	"Forget About Boys"	November 17, 2009
22	22	"If You Want Something Done Right..."	November 24, 2009
23	23	"Everything on the Line"	December 1, 2009

=== Season 2 (2010) ===
No. overall	No. in season	Title	Original release date	U.S. viewers (millions)
24	1	"Show Em' What You Got"	April 27, 2010	1.964
25	2	"Friends In High Places"	May 4, 2010	1.519
26	3	"Professionally Dangerous"	May 11, 2010	1.681
27	4	"Queen of Diamonds"	May 18, 2010	1.617
28	5	"The Belle of Elle"	May 25, 2010	1.441
29	6	"Fashion with a Capital F"	June 1, 2010	1.812
30	7	"The British Are Coming"	June 8, 2010	1.474
31	8	"Work Horses and Show Ponies"	June 15, 2010	N/A
32	9	"One Girl's Trash..."	June 22, 2010	N/A
33	10	"Stage Fight"	June 29, 2010	1.319
34	11	"Roommate Wanted"	July 6, 2010	1.556
35	12	"Lost In Translation"	July 13, 2010	2.326
