= Johannes Huebl =

German model, photographer and creative director

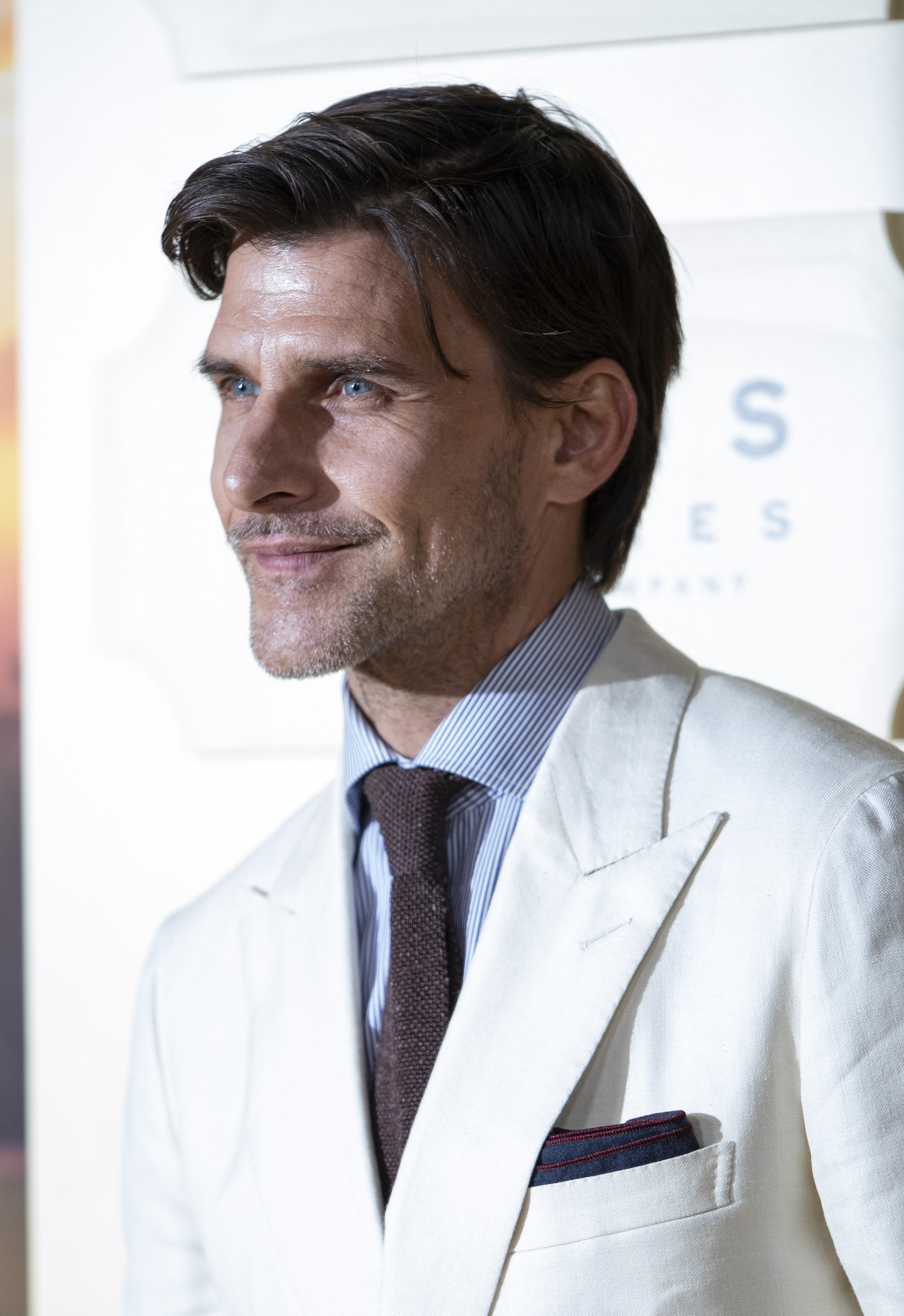
- Johannes in 2025
- Born: Johannes Huebl; December 23, 1977 (age 48); Hannover, Germany
- Education: University of Hamburg
- Spouse: Olivia Palermo (m.2014)
- Modeling information
- Height: 1.88 m (6 ft 2 in)
- Hair color: Brown
- Eye color: Blue

Johannes Huebl (born December 23, 1977) is a German model, photographer, creative director, and lifestyle influencer.

== Early life ==
Huebl was born in Hanover. His father, Volker Busse, is a doctor. His older brother is the philosopher and author Philipp Hübl, and his younger brother Julius is a neurologist in Munich.

== Education ==
Huebl attended the Kaiser-Wilhelm-Gymnasium in his hometown of Hanover. While temporarily attending the boarding school King's Hospital in Dublin, he was discovered by a model scout at the age of 17. After graduating from high school (Abitur) in Hanover, he completed his military service and began studying economics at the University of Hamburg. There, a Hamburg modeling agency added him to their roster. He then continued his studies at the Leuphana University of Lüneburg and earned a degree in cultural studies.

== Personal life ==
Huebl has been married to American model Olivia Palermo since 2014. The couple met in 2007 through mutual friends and reside in New York City.

== Career ==
In his modeling career, Huebl appeared in campaigns for Hugo Boss, Emanuel Ungaro, Ralph Lauren and many others. He began modeling in Paris in the late 1990s and has since worked for brands such as Tommy Hilfiger, Ferragamo, Donna Karan, Calvin Klein, Dolce & Gabbana, and Banana Republic and was photographed by renowned artists such as Peter Lindbergh and Mario Testino for magazines including GQ, Vanity Fair, Elle, Vogue and Harper's Bazaar.

Huebl is considered one of the most sought-after male models in the fashion industry.
