= William Rast =

American clothing line

- Industry: Clothing
- Founded: 2005; 21 years ago
- Founder: Justin Timberlake; Trace Ayala
- Headquarters: Los Angeles, California, U.S.
- Products: Clothing
- Owner: Yehuda Shmidman
- Website: williamrast.com

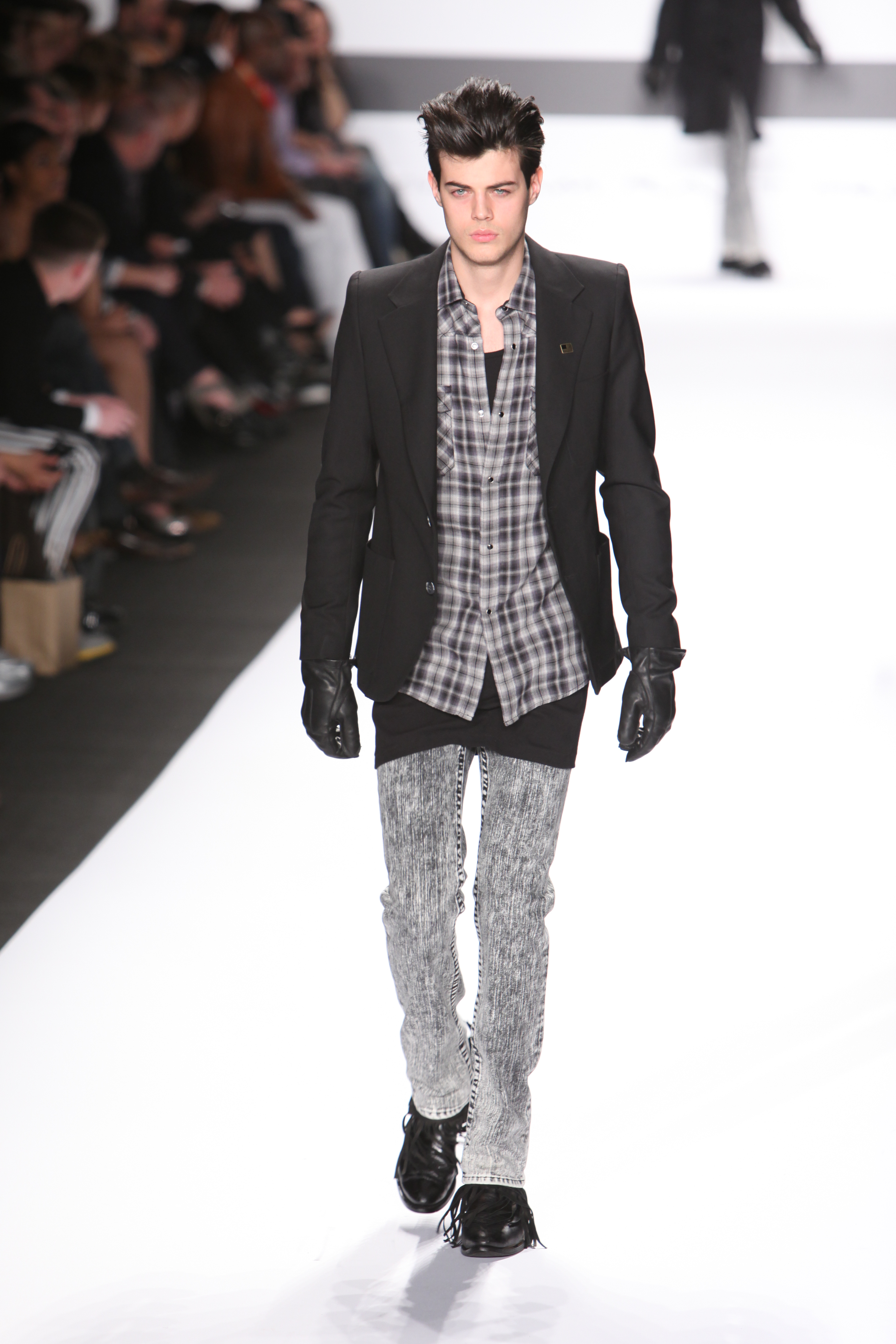
A William Rast model walking down the catwalk at the 2009 New York Fashion Week

William Rast is an American clothing line. It was founded by Justin Timberlake and Trace Ayala in 2005 and is currently owned by Yehuda Shmidman.

The name "William Rast" is a combination of Timberlake's grandfather's first name and Ayala's grandfather's last name.

The brand has had partnerships with designers such as Johan and Marcella Lindeberg as well as retailers such as Target.

== History ==
William Rast was founded by Justin Timberlake and Trace Ayala in 2005 as a denim line.

William Rast sponsored the #98 Bryan Herta Autosport / Curb-Agajanian Performance Group IndyCar of Dan Wheldon which won the 2011 Indianapolis 500. Wheldon died in a crash in October 2011.

In November 2021, as part of a bankruptcy, WHP Global, owned by Yehuda Shmidman, acquired the company.
