= J.Lindeberg =

Swedish clothing company

- Company type: Private company
- Industry: Fashion
- Founded: 1997; 29 years ago in Stockholm
- Headquarters: Stockholm
- Key people: Johan Lindeberg (founder)
- Products: golf & ski clothing polo shirts training clothes jackets suits shirts
- Website: jlindeberg.com USA & Canada

J.Lindeberg is a Swedish clothing company. Their range includes tennis, golf and ski clothing, polo shirts, training clothes, jackets, suits, and shirts.

== History ==
=== Founding ===
Johan Lindeberg founded the J.Lindeberg brand in 1996. Lindeberg, who had been the marketing director of Diesel, resigned from his duties at the Italian denim brand to create his own brand.

Lindeberg launched his brand, J.Lindeberg, during the summer of 1996 in Stockholm and New York City simultaneously. Lindeberg served as Creative Director, and assembled a small team of designers headed by Roland Hjort, who was recruited from the Swedish apparel brand H&M.

=== 21st Century Lifestyle ===
The first design concept was called 21st Century Lifestyle, and the collection was showcased in New York during the Fashion Week Fall Winter 1997 Season, featuring men’s fashion and golf clothing.

To further develop the golf concept, Lindeberg turned to PGA-tour golfer Jesper Parnevik.

=== Critical acclaim ===
In 1999, Swedish Elle presented J.Lindeberg with the "Designer of the Year" award. The following year (2000) J.Lindeberg received the "Guldknappen" (golden button) award as "Most Innovative Designer". Later in 2000, J.Lindeberg opened its first flagship store in central Stockholm. Several more concept stores followed shortly in New York City, Tokyo, Yokohama and Los Angeles.

By 2002, J.Lindeberg's annual turnover had reached 219 million Swedish kronor, selling in 500 stores worldwide. Lindeberg decided to feature his collections for the first time as a part of official New York Fashion Week Schedule in Bryant Park. J.Lindeberg has been worn on several official occasions by Bono from U2, Brad Pitt, Justin Timberlake, Ashton Kutcher, The Killers, and Jane's Addiction, among others.

In mid-2002, Lindeberg and his wife Marcella, whom he met at Diesel, permanently relocated to London to set up a base for J.Lindeberg's international marketing operations and a UK showroom with the purpose of expanding the brand. Shortly thereafter, the first women's collection was revealed under the supervision of Marcella. Lindeberg also announced that J.Lindeberg would for the first time present a full denim concept for both men and women.

After appearing at the Milano Moda Uomo Fashion week, work began on reconstructing J.Lindeberg's worldwide stores to also carry the women's collection.

As work began on the women's collection, Lindeberg revealed J.Lindeberg Future Sports. J.Lindeberg Future Sports also carried a completely new store concept and the first store opened in central Stockholm. The season after its initiation, the Future Sports Concept produced the first J.Lindeberg Ski Collection that was showcased together with the Fall/Winter 2005 season in Milan. The face of J.Lindeberg Ski became Swedish free skier Jon Olsson.

The J.Lindeberg Ski collection was exhibited at ISPO-fair in Germany where it won the "Newcomer of the Year" award. More concept collections appeared the following years, including, swimwear, sunglasses and shoes.

=== Restructuring ===
In 2007, the decreasing profitability of the company had begun to put heavy pressure on the relationship between Lindeberg and J.Lindeberg's major shareholders. The issues were resolved when the capital investment firm Proventus became the new principal owner of J.Lindeberg with Stefan Engström, who also became the company’s new CEO. Before committing to J.Lindeberg, Engström had been one of the co-founders of Swedish sports apparel brand Peak Performance.

In the wake of the restructure, Lindeberg returned to the role of Creative Director and relocated with Marcella to New York.

The J.Lindeberg Ski Collection had been reintroduced, headed by Fredrik Dahl, who used to be the design director at "The North Face". J.Lindeberg's retail stores were remade by the French/Swedish architect Albert Francois Lenoard. The first of the new store concepts to open was the Flagship Store on in central Stockholm.

Pierangelo D'Agostin was reappointed as Design Director, with the responsibility of all concepts. He had been design director at Jil Sander and his own Japanese luxury brand hLam.

=== Today ===
Since 2012 J.Lindeberg has been owned by Anders Holch Povlsen (founder and owner of Bestseller), Dan Friis, Allan Warburg (also co-owners of Bestseller China) and Stefan Engström. The company has expanded globally and now also has a Chinese business. There are over 215 branded stores and shop in shops worldwide and yearly brand sales of approximately 1.6 BN SEK per year. In 2017, Stefan Engström decided to leave the role as CEO and was replaced by the company’s CFO, Johan Mark. Stefan Engström however, still continues to play an active role within the company.

J.Lindeberg continues to offer Fashion, Golf, Ski and Active Wear collections.

The design head office of all collections is situated in Stockholm, where the international design team sits. In January 2016, Johan Lindeberg came back to the company on a two-year assignment in the role of Creative Consultant.
