= Whitney Port =

American actor and fashion designer

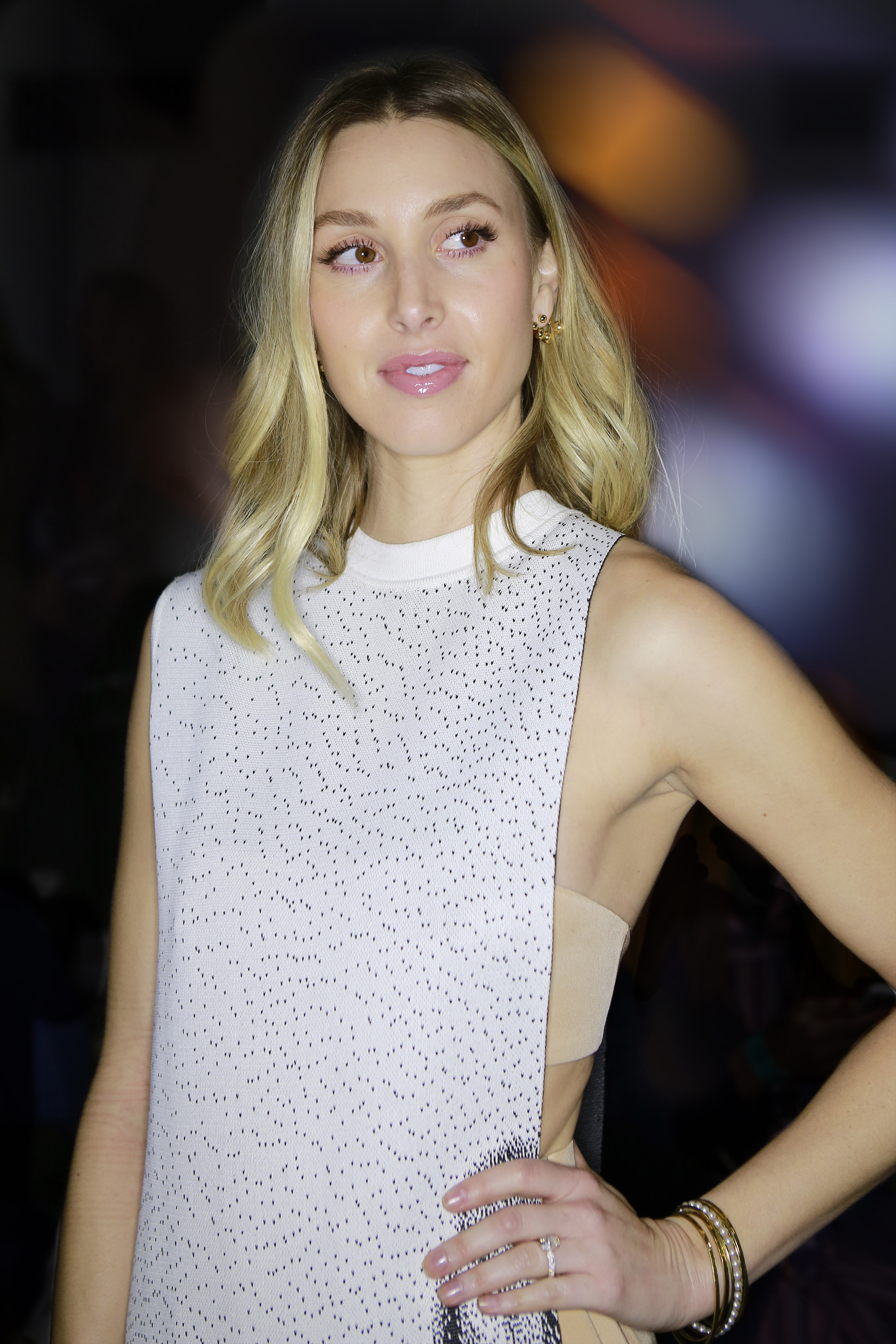
- Port in February 2015
- Born: Whitney Eve Port; March 4, 1985 (age 41); Los Angeles, California, U.S.
- Education: University of Southern California (BA)
- Occupations: Television personality; fashion designer; author
- Years active: 2005–present
- Television: The Hills; The City; Britain and Ireland's Next Top Model
- Spouse: Tim Rosenman (m. 2015)
- Children: 1
- Website: whitneyport.com

Whitney Eve Port-Rosenman (born March 4, 1985) is an American television personality, fashion designer, and author. In 2006, Port came to prominence after being cast in the reality television series The Hills, which chronicled the personal and professional lives of Port and friends Lauren Conrad, Heidi Montag, and Audrina Patridge. During its production, she held internship positions with Teen Vogue and Kelly Cutrone's People's Revolution.

After moving to New York City to begin an internship with Diane von Fürstenberg in 2008, Port was commissioned to star in her own spin-off series The City, which originally documented the lives of Port and companions Jay Lyon, Olivia Palermo, and Adam Senn. After undergoing several casting adjustments and receiving solid ratings the series was canceled in 2010 after airing two seasons, due to high production costs. Port launched her fashion line "Whitney Eve" in 2009. In 2012, she served as a judge on the eighth cycle of Britain & Ireland's Next Top Model.

== Life and career ==
=== 1985–2005: Early life and education ===
Whitney Eve Port was born in Los Angeles to parents Jeffrey and Vicki (née Woskoff). Her father owned a fashion company, Swarm. Port has a brother Ryan and three sisters Ashley, Paige, and Jade, and was raised in a Jewish household.

Port attended Warner Avenue Elementary School and Crossroads School, alongside her The Hills co-stars, Spencer and Stephanie Pratt. In 2007, she graduated from the University of Southern California with a bachelor's degree in gender studies. Afterwards, Port held internships with the magazines Women's Wear Daily and W.

=== 2006–2010: The Hills and The City ===
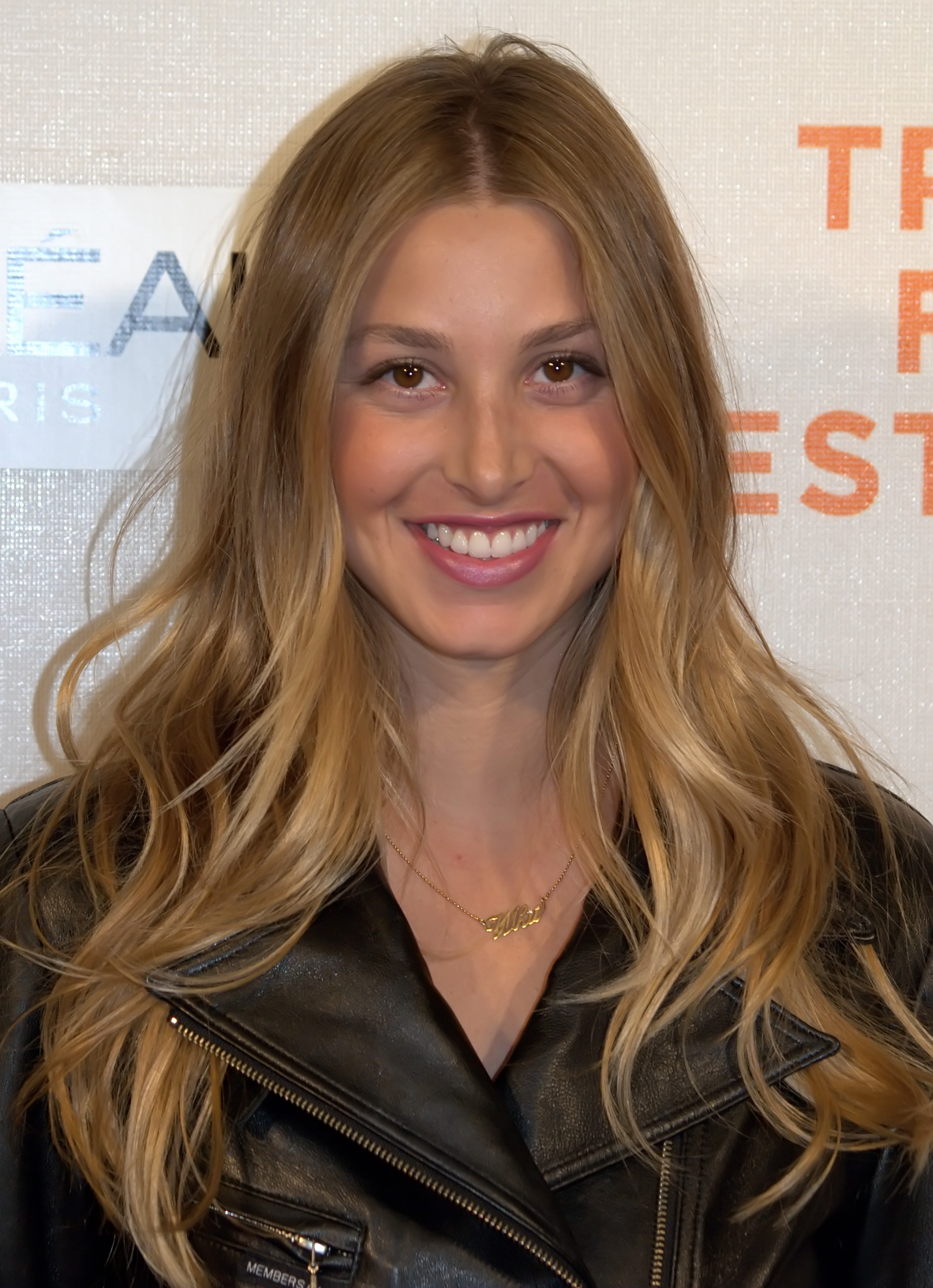
Port at the 2009 Tribeca Film Festival

In 2006, MTV developed the reality television series The Hills as the spin-off of Laguna Beach: The Real Orange County. It originally chronicled the lives of Lauren Conrad, who appeared on its predecessor, her housemate Heidi Montag, and friends Audrina Patridge and Port. During production of the first season, Port and Conrad held internships with Teen Vogue under the direction of West Coast Vogue editor Lisa Love, who stated the girls had to interview successfully for the positions, "regardless of what the cameras wanted". In 2007, Port notably tripped down the stairs during a live segment for Good Morning America. During the third season of The Hills, Port was promoted as the West Coast fashion contributor for Teen Vogue, and left the position in 2008. Later that year, Port and Conrad began interning with Kelly Cutrone's public relations firm, People's Revolution. Port rejected an opportunity to become housemates with Conrad and Patridge, saying she "[prefers] to keep some things private".

In March 2008, Port debuted her first fashion line "Whitney Eve". Upon the conclusion of the fourth season of The Hills that December, Port moved to New York City to accept an internship position with Diane von Fürstenberg. That month, she was commissioned to star in the spin-off series The City, which additionally placed emphasis on her boyfriend Jay Lyon, their friends Erin Lucas and Adam Senn, and her co-worker Olivia Palermo. During the first half of the inaugural season, Port severed ties with Lyon, clashed with Palermo at the workplace, and ultimately returned to People's Revolution. After underwhelming ratings, Lyon, Lucas, and Senn were replaced by Port's friend Roxy Olin and Palermo's new co-worker Erin Kaplan in the second half of the first season. The series' second season saw the development of "Whitney Eve", and aired its final episode in July 2010 before being officially cancelled that October.

=== 2011–2018: Retail projects and family ===
In late 2010, Port made an appearance on the online series, Hollywood Is Like High School with Money, for which she served as the executive producer. The program additionally served as a promotional platform for her "Whitney Eve" collection. In January 2011, Port was featured in a magazine spread in Maxim. In February, Port released her first book True Whit: Designing a Life of Style, Beauty, and Fun. Later that year, she hosted the Hulu-exclusive game show, Genuine Ken.

In 2012, Port was confirmed to join the judging panel of the eighth cycle of Britain and Ireland's Next Top Model, alongside fellow new hire Tyson Beckford, and returning judges Elle Macpherson and Julien MacDonald. She left the program upon the conclusion of the season. Port had a cameo role in the film, What To Expect When You're Expecting, starring Jennifer Lopez.

=== 2019–present: The Hills: New Beginnings and media ventures ===
At the 2018 MTV Video Music Awards, MTV announced a reboot of The Hills entitled The Hills: New Beginnings, slated to premiere in 2019. Port was announced as part of the cast of the new series. Port had started a YouTube channel in 2012 to promote the release of her fashion line, which then followed her life as a wife and mother. Since 2019, it has primarily become a reaction channel of Port and her husband to Port's appearances on The Hills: New Beginnings, The City and The Hills. Port also started her podcast With Whit, in collaboration with Dear Media, in August 2019.

As of 2022, Port and her husband have continued filming reaction videos (Previously on the Screviously) to MTV reality shows for their YouTube channel. They are currently recapping Siesta Key. She launched her new clothing line CozeCo in June 2021 and regularly releases limited edition merchandise in collaboration with her Previously on the Screviously YouTube series.

== Personal life ==
In March 2013, Whitney's father, Jeffrey Port, died from a year-long battle with kidney cancer. In November 2013, she announced her engagement to her former The City producer, Tim Rosenman, whom she began dating in 2012. They were married on November 7, 2015. Port and Rosenman have a son, Sonny Sanford Rosenman, born July 27, 2017. Port has suffered a chemical pregnancy, and three miscarriages, in July 2019, January 2020 and November 2021. She started the surrogacy process through IVF in 2023, which resulted in three miscarriages.

== Filmography ==
Year	Title	Notes
2006–2008	The Hills	Main cast member (seasons 1–4)
2008	Entourage	"Gotta Look Up to Get Down" (season 5, episode 7)
2008–10	The City	Narrator and main cast member (seasons 1–2)
2009	Family Guy	"We Love You, Conrad" (season 7, episode 14)
2010	America's Next Top Model	"Big Hair Day" (cycle 14, episode 8)
2010	Hollywood is Like High School with Money	1 episode
2010	Anna & Kristina's Beauty Call	"Kathryn: Sophisticated Evening" (season 1, episode 10)
2011	Genuine Ken	Host (season 1)
2012	Britain & Ireland's Next Top Model	Judge (cycle 8)
2012	What to Expect When You're Expecting	Cameo
2016	Almost Royal	"Holiday" (season 2, episode 8)
2019, 2021	The Hills: New Beginnings	Main cast member (2019), Recurring (2021)

== Published works ==
- True Whit: Designing a Life of Style, Beauty, and Fun (2011)
