= Joe Zee =

Hong Kong-Canadian stylist, journalist and producer (born 1968)

- Born: November 23, 1968 (age 57); Hong Kong
- Occupation: Stylist, journalist, producer
- Spouse: Rob Younkers

Joe Zee (born November 23, 1968) is a Hong Kong-born Canadian fashion stylist, journalist, and producer, known for Entertainment Tonight (1981), FABLife (2015) and Celebrity Style Story (2012). Zee served as creative director of Elle for seven years. He became editor-in-chief and executive creative officer of Yahoo! Style in April 2014. He resigned from Yahoo in June 2017.

== Career ==
In the mid-1990s, Zee met stylist Lori Goldstein at an Allure party, and soon became her assistant.

He was described in a New York Times profile as a leader in the mass market and digital transformation of fashion: "a chatty and approachable ambassador of fashion who has aggressively thrust himself in front of hoi polloi using Twitter, blogs, v-logs and—most visibly—television."

Zee hosts All on the Line, a fashion series on the Sundance Channel. In each episode, Zee acts as a business consultant to a designer who is struggling.

Zee was a recurring character as boss of the reality series The City. He has also appeared on episodes of Ugly Betty, Mistresses, and General Hospital as himself. He was one of the co-hosts of the ABC daytime talk show The Fab Life.

Zee has worked with notable photographers including Annie Leibovitz, Juergen Teller and Patrick Demarchelier.

In 2010, he made an appearance on Gossip Girl as himself. In 2015, he released his book That's What Fashion Is: Lessons and Stories from My Nonstop, Mostly Glamorous Life in Style.

In 2016, he was one of the guest judges in the final of Miss USA 2016 in T-Mobile Arena, Las Vegas, Nevada, United States.In 2015, he released his book That's What Fashion Is: Lessons and Stories from My Nonstop, Mostly Glamorous Life in Style.

== Personal life ==
Zee is married to Rob Younkers, host of Logo TV's Secret Guide to Fabulous.

== See also ==
- Chinese in New York City
