= Erin Lucas =

American businesswoman, model and television personality

- Born: October 24, 1984 (age 41); Honolulu, Hawaii, U.S.
- Education: New York University (BS); Fashion Institute of Design & Merchandising (AA)
- Occupations: Businesswoman; model; television personality
- Family: Cliff Williams (father)

Erin Williams, professionally known as Erin Lucas, (born October 24, 1984) is an American businesswoman, model and television personality. She is the founder and creative director of interior design studio, House of Lucas. She is also the daughter of AC/DC bassist, Cliff Williams.

== Life and career ==
Erin Lucas was born as Erin Williams. She uses her brother's name as her surname. She is the daughter of Georganne and Cliff Williams, bass guitarist of AC/DC. As a child, she spent a lot of time touring with her father's band. In 2007, she graduated from New York University with a bachelor's degree in Media, Culture and Communication and worked as a talent liaison and project coordinator with One Model Management.

In 2008, she became a cast member of the MTV reality television show, The City, a spinoff of The Hills, where she reunited with longtime friend Whitney Port.

She relocated to Los Angeles after the series' conclusion where she received her Associate of Arts degree in Interior Design from the Fashion Institute of Design & Merchandising.

== Filmography ==
Television and film roles
Year	Title	Role	Notes
2008–10	The City	Herself	13 episodes
2014	Buzz: AT&T Original Documentaries	Herself / Host	Episode: "Epix Movies"
