= Claw Money =

American fashion designer and artist

Claudia "Claw Money" Gold
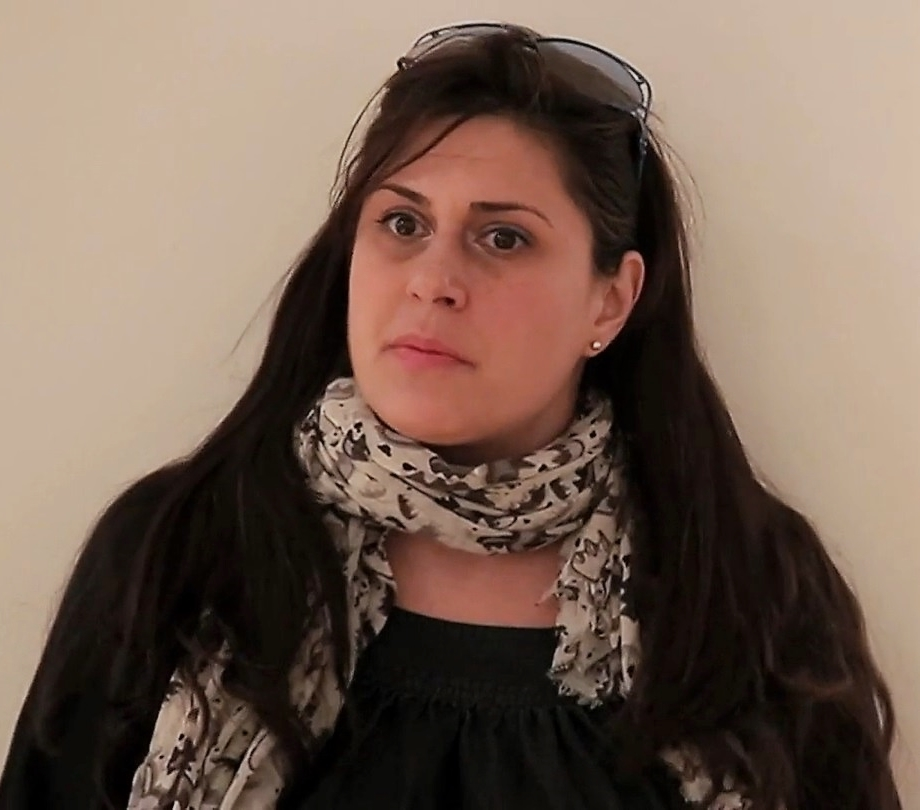
- Claw Money in 2012
- Born: Claudia Gold; 1968 (age 57–58); Fresh Meadows, Queens
- Occupations: Artist, fashion designer
- Years active: 1980s–present
- Website: clawmoney.com

Claw Money (born Claudia Gold in 1968, New York City) is a New York-based graffiti writer turned fashion designer. In 2009 Tag au Grand Palais in Paris, France named Claudia Gold a/k/a Claw one of the most influential graffiti artists of all time.

== Early life ==
Gold was born into a Jewish family in Fresh Meadows, Queens, and Roslyn, New York and attended the Fashion Institute of Technology until 1986, when she dropped out to pursue other artistic pursuits. Through the late 1980s and early 1990s, her icon, a paw with three claws, could be seen on the New York graffiti landscape on walls and trains with the graffiti crews TC5 and FC.

== Career ==
After making her mark throughout NYC with her graffiti, she became the fashion editor and director at Swindle Magazine. She began styling, which led her to becoming a vintage dealer. In 2002, she broke out as a fashion designer, launching her 'signature clothing line' Claw Money, later creating collaborations with the Claw & Company labels.

=== Graffiti ===
She has been influenced by other graffiti artists such as Zephyr, Dondi, Revolt, Sharp, Dontay, Devo and MQ, with Zephyr having a significant influence. She is the only woman featured in an art documentary directed by Doug Pray, exploring the subculture of graffiti art in New York City.

== Claw Money Collaborations ==
Finding an outlet in fashion and design, the brands CLAWMONEY and Claw&Co. have collaborated with companies such as Calvin Klein, Marc Ecko, G Pen, Lord & Taylor, rag & bone, NASCAR, Good Wood, Ugg Australia, Converse, Vans, Mountain Dew, K2 Snowboarding, My Little Pony, Boost Mobile, and Nike, with whom she designed two styles of Claw Money custom sneakers.

Her graphic designs are influenced by her childhood: Peter Max, the Smurfs, Strawberry Shortcake, Bugs Bunny, comic books, Hello Kitty, video games, and pop culture in general. While designing she likes to listen mostly to oldies, many 1950s girl groups, Bill Withers, pre-1995 hip hop, disco, and punk rock. In 2007, Bombshell, The Life and Crimes of Claw Money by Claw Money was published by powerHouse Books.

== Claw & Co. ==
As of June 2014, Claw will be launching the debut line of Claw & Co. The collection remixes athletic staples with updated silhouettes and unique textiles, focusing on patterns.

=== Celebrity following ===
The clothing line Claw Money has a celebrity following that includes M.I.A. (artist), Kanye West, Kreayshawn, Nicki Minaj, Rihanna and Santigold. She designed Britney Spears's clothing in Super Bowl XXXV. Her apparel can be found in retailers including Colette, Charlotte Ronson, Patricia Field, Fred Segal and the Standard Hotel's Oh WOW.

== Press ==
In 2012, she was the subject of the short documentary Claw by the digital channel WIGS. Doug Pray's graffiti documentary, "Infamy" from 2005 in part, is an homage to Claw. Her first book, Bombshell:The Life and Crimes of Claw Money was published in 2007 . Google is also putting the finishing touches on a short film about her that is going to launch its upcoming series on artists.
