= Alexandra Crandell =

American model and TV personality

Allie Crandell
- Born: Alexandra Crandell; 1987 (age 38–39); Sacramento, California, U.S.
- Modeling information
- Height: 5 ft 8 in (173 cm)
- Hair color: Brown
- Eye color: Brown

Alexandra "Allie" Crandell (born 1987) is an American fashion model and television personality best known for her appearance on MTV's The City.

== Early life ==
Born in Sacramento, California, Crandell attended Elitha Donner Elementary school in Elk Grove, CA. Her father, local TV personality Jim Crandell, is the correspondent sports director for Sacramento's Fox-affiliated television station KTXL (Fox 40).

== Career ==
=== Modeling ===
Crandell was signed to Wilhelmina Models in 2007 after sending her pictures to the agency. Within that year, Crandell was featured on models.com's model of the week. Since then, she has appeared in the Shayne Ward video for "No Promises" and the Duran Duran video for "Falling Down." She was also featured in a Revolve Clothing campaign in 2007 and Diesel's "Hair Bath" videos in 2009. In May 2008, Crandell appeared alongside Erin Heatherton and Camilla Finn in a V Magazine editorial photographed by notable fashion photographer, Ellen von Unwerth.

In 2009, Crandell left Wilhelmina Models and is now represented by One Model Management. Crandell is also represented by Independent Models in London. In 2016, she starred in the BILLY video for "Love Don't Break Me" alongside Bill Kaulitz, lead singer of the German band Tokio Hotel.

=== The City ===
In 2008, Crandell became a part of the MTV reality show The City. Although she played a major role in season 1 of the series, she had no lead or star billing. She appeared twice in the second half of season 2. And before that, Crandell confirmed via her personal Twitter account that she will no longer be appearing on the show, stating, "I'm done with The City forever."
