= Jay Lyon =

Australian singer, actor and model

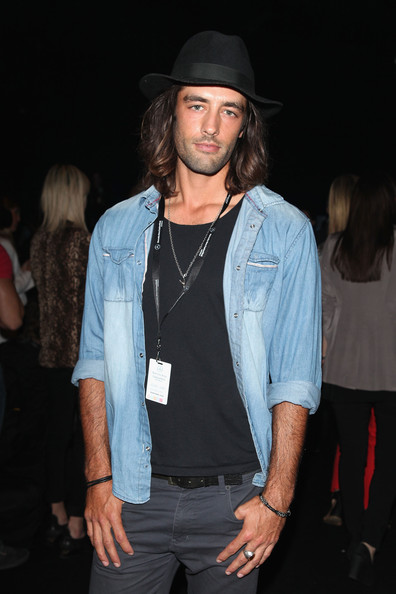
- Jay Lyons at Australian Fashion Week in April 2012
- Born: Brent Tuhtan; 14 June 1984 (age 41); Sydney, New South Wales, Australia
- Occupation(s): Singer, Model, Actor
- Years active: 2000-present

Jay Lyon (born Brent Tuhtan on 14 June 1984) is an Australian model and musician in the band Tamarama, and reality television star who appeared in The Hills and The City television series.

== Career ==
Jay Lyon started off his career as a model and is a member of the band Tamarama, which took its name from the suburb of Tamarama, Sydney, Australia. They get their influences from beachside folk-pop artists such as Jack Johnson and G. Love & Special Sauce, along with fellow member Nicolas Pottsy Potts the band released their first Album/EP, Wonderland City on 7 May 2008, named after the Wonderland City amusement park in Sydney, and on 1 June 2010 they released their first full album titled Tamarama on label Universal/Motown.

In 2008 Lyon appeared in the American MTV teen series, The Hills, and shortly afterwards followed that up by appearing in the MTV spin-off series, The City, playing the part of Whitney Port's boyfriend, with whom he was having a relationship in real life.

In 2014 Lyon co-founded the Original Meatball Company with Dominic Lopresti, a restaurant specializing in meatballs inspired by Lyon's experiences in New York. From February 2015 to February 2017 Lyon operated a recruitment business, Lyon Recruitment. Lyon Recruitment provided Labour Market Testing services to immigrants to Australia to obtain skilled work visas. Lyon also worked as a paralegal at Perez Varela Lawyers during these years.

In 2016 to present, Lyon is a partner in a production company with long time friend and artist and photographer Nick Leary. The company named The Aesthetic create visual assets for luxury brands and property developments. Their most recent work being for Australia's most prestigious residential property development One Circular Quay.

== Personal life ==
In 2003 Jay Lyon dated Australian supermodel Miranda Kerr. The couple were together for four years before ending their relationship in 2007.

In 2008, he started a relationship with American reality TV star Whitney Port, and starred on the TV series The Hills and The City alongside her. Growing up he was a student at the exclusive St Aloysius' College in Kirribilli, Sydney.

== Discography ==
- Wonderland City (2008)
- Tamarama (2010)

== Filmography ==
| Year | Film/TV | Role | Notes |
|---|---|---|---|
| 2001 | Fluffer | Himself | Film |
| 2008 | The Hills | Himself | Appeared in 2 episodes |
| 2008-2009 | The City | Himself | Starred in a total of 14 episodes from 2008 to 2009 |
