= Erin Kaplan =

American publicist and television and fashion media personality

- Born: 1983 (age 42–43); Los Angeles, California, United States
- Education: Marymount Manhattan College (BS)
- Occupations: Executive Director of Public Relations, Architectural Digest

Erin Kaplan (born 1983) is an American publicist and television and fashion media personality.

Kaplan graduated from Marymount Manhattan College with an undergraduate degree in marketing. For five and a half years, Kaplan worked for ELLE Magazine and was their youngest Director of Public Relations. During that time, she was a cast member on the MTV reality television series The City.

In January 2011, Kaplan left ELLE to join Teen Vogue as their new Senior Director of Public Relations, taking over for Eleanor Banco.

Kaplan is currently the Executive Director of Public Relations for Architectural Digest. Prior to this, she was the Director of Public Relations for Allure Magazine.
