= The City (2008 TV series) =

New York-based reality television series in the United States

- Genre: Reality television
- Created by: Adam DiVello
- Starring: Whitney Port; Jay Lyon; Erin Lucas; Adam Senn; Olivia Palermo; Roxy Olin; Erin Kaplan
- Narrated by: Whitney Port
- Opening theme: "Top of the World" by Pussycat Dolls
- Country of origin: United States
- Original language: English
- No. of seasons: 2
- No. of episodes: 35 (list of episodes)

Production
- Executive producers: Liz Gateley; Sean Travis
- Production locations: New York City, New York
- Running time: 22 minutes
- Production companies: Done and Done Productions

Original release
- Network: MTV
- Release: December 29, 2008 – July 13, 2010

Related
- The Hills

The City is an American reality television series that originally aired on MTV from December 29, 2008, until July 13, 2010. Developed as the spin-off of The Hills, the series aired two seasons and focused on the personal and professional lives of several young women residing in New York City, New York. Its premise was conceived by Adam DiVello, while Liz Gateley and Sean Travis served as executive producers.

The series originally focused on Whitney Port, who appeared in its predecessor, as she began employment with Diane von Fürstenberg. It additionally placed emphasis on her workplace rival Olivia Palermo, Port's boyfriend Jay Lyon, his roommate Adam Senn, and her friend Erin Lucas. The latter three were replaced by Port's roommate Roxy Olin and Palermo's co-worker Erin Kaplan for the second half of the first season.

Like its predecessor, the series was often criticized for tending towards a narrative format more commonly seen in scripted genres including soap operas, and appearing to fabricate much of its storyline. The show has distributed all seasons to DVD.

== Background ==
In 2004, the reality television series Laguna Beach: The Real Orange County premiered on MTV. The program was created by Liz Gateley and documented the lives of several students attending Laguna Beach High School as they completed secondary education. The series proved among the network's most successful programming, though the entire original cast left after the second season and were replaced by another group of teenagers for the following season. Television producer Adam DiVello developed the spin-off program The Hills to follow one of its predecessor's original cast members Lauren Conrad as she moved to Los Angeles to pursue a career in the fashion industry. After The Hills itself became similarly successful, DiVello developed The City upon the conclusion of the parent series' fourth season, which saw one of its primary cast members Whitney Port move to New York City to begin employment with Diane von Fürstenberg.

== Series synopsis ==
=== Overview and casting ===
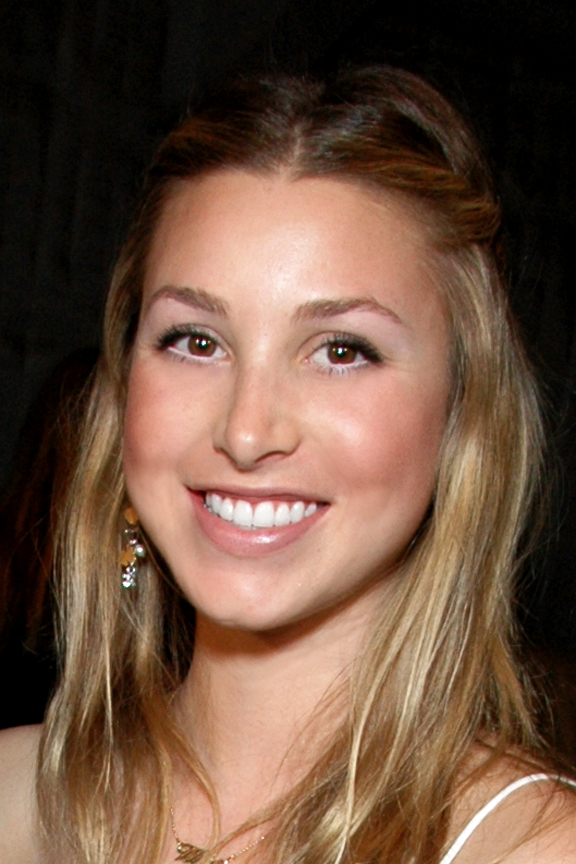
Whitney Port served as the series' focus for its two-season run.

The City chronicles the lives of several young women living in New York City, New York. Every installment commences with a voice-over narrative from series lead Whitney Port, foreshadowing the theme of the episode. Each season concludes with a finale, typically involving a major event such as a progressing relationship or the departure of a cast member. Most installments revolve around the women's everyday lives, with the intention of balancing coverage of their personal and professional endeavors. The City: Live After Show was occasionally aired following the broadcast of an episode; the program followed The After Show format used by other MTV programs, including The Hills, where Jessi Cruickshank and Dan Levy served as hosts while the audience commented on the episode.

Throughout its run, the series was led by five primary cast members during its first season and four during its second. Its original main cast members were Port, Jay Lyon, Erin Lucas, Adam Senn, and Olivia Palermo. Lucas, Lyon, and Senn were replaced by Roxy Olin and Erin Kaplan beginning in the second half of the first season. The aforementioned women's storylines were largely developed by a number of supporting cast members. Alexandra Crandell was credited as "Adam's girlfriend", while Samantha Swetra was labeled "Whitney's friend". Kelly Cutrone was featured the owner of the PR firm People's Revolution and the employer of Port and Olin, while Joe Zee was credited as Palermo's boss at Elle.

=== Storylines ===
In its series premiere, The City first introduces Whitney Port, who moved from Los Angeles, California to New York City, New York to begin employment for fashion designer Diane von Fürstenberg. She reunited with her friend Erin Lucas and love interest Jay Lyon, and befriended co-worker Olivia Palermo against her companions' advice. Port became irritated the feelings Lyon had for his ex-girlfriend Danielle and his unwillingness to commit to a relationship, and eventually severed ties with him. Lyon's distaste for his housemate Adam Senn's girlfriend Allie Crandell ultimately ruined their friendship, while Senn and Crandell's relationship was strained by rumors of his alleged infidelity. Lucas' long-distance boyfriend Duncan Davies, who lived in Toronto, Ontario, Canada, broke up with Lucas after discovering that she had become friendly with her ex-boyfriend JR. Meanwhile, the companionship between Port and Palermo dissolved after growing tensions in the workplace.

Prior to production of the second half of the season, Lucas, Lyon, and Senn departed from the series. Port also left her position at Diane von Fürstenberg and resumed working at her previous employer Kelly Cutrone's PR firm People's Revolution. As the season resumed, Port's friend Roxy Olin was introduced as a new main cast member, and was hired at People's Revolution. Palermo had left Diane von Fürstenberg for a position with Elle, where she clashed with co-worker and new main cast member Erin Kaplan. With Cutrone's guidance, Port begins designing a fashion line, while Kaplan becomes increasingly displeased with Palermo's under-performance. Port also began dating friend Freddie Fackelmayer, but was dismayed to learn that he had a girlfriend. By the season finale, Port had presented the "Whitney Eve" lookbook to Bergdorf Goodman, and decided to further publicize her collection through a fashion show at Bryant Park.

In the beginning of the second season, Joe Zee attempted to salvage the relationship between Palermo and Kaplan by reassigning the former to work on Elle.com. However, the strategy proved unsuccessful as the women continue to clash with one another. Meanwhile, Olin begins a flirtatious friendship with photographer Zach Hyman. Cutrone cautions Port that Olin's lack of professionalism and inexperience in the industry may damage Port's reputation. However, Olin's under-performance ultimately strained their friendship, and culminated in Olin moving into an apartment with their friend Samantha Swetra. The season finale sees Palermo promoted as the new face of Elle.com after a successful business trip to Japan, while Port contemplates leaving People's Revolution after she and Cutrone clash over the development of her fashion line.

== Reception ==
=== Critical response ===
The City received generally mixed reviews from critics. Melissa Camacho of Common Sense Media criticized the program for featuring a near-identical plotline to its predecessor The Hills, where Lauren Conrad was similarly shown to pursue a career in the fashion industry while addressing difficulties among her friends. Ginia Bellefante from The New York Times suggested that the series was purposely produced sub-par to its parent series, commenting that it "is not the advertisement for New York that The Hills, with its dreamily shot opening-credit sequence, is for Los Angeles". An editor from The Village Voice questioned if Port was interesting enough to lead her own spin-off series, describing her personality as featuring "unavoidable, inexorable ordinariness".

=== Scripting allegations ===
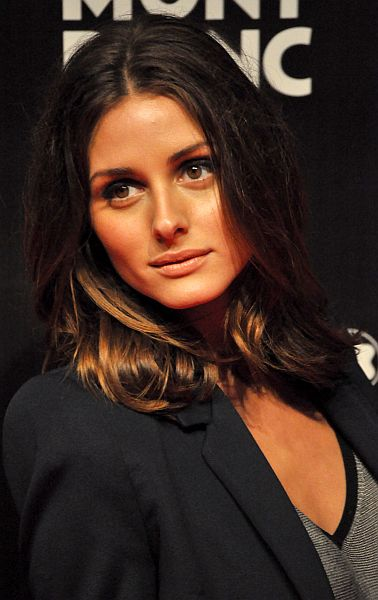
Olivia Palermo was displeased with her antagonistic portrayal.

The City was often criticized for appearing to fabricate much of its storyline. In one instance, Diane von Fürstenberg workers were reportedly angered that Port "doesn't really work" and was "hardly ever in the office", elaborating that series producers would inhibit normal work operations by not allowing employees to move items in their offices. Freddie Fackelmayer, Port's former love interest, commented that the network "never asked the cast to say or do anything", though the editing that followed portrayed him as a "womanizing jerk".

An additional source of suspicion arose in the second half of the first season, where Palermo allegedly purchased counterfeit accessories on Canal Street for a work assignment; the non-discreet nature of the transaction led to speculation that the scene was staged for the segment. In 2009, Palermo commented that she was "disappointed" by the "villainous" manner in which she was portrayed on the program. She added that she was "super friendly" with Port at work, whereas the series depicted a more strained relationship.

=== U.S. television ratings ===
The series opening of The City premiered to 1.6 million viewers, significantly less than the 2.6 million viewers attracted by the fourth-season finale of The Hills. The second half of the season premiered with 2 million viewers, a 43% increase from its debut. The remainder of the season maintained an average 1.9 million viewers, with the finale peaking at 2.3 million. Upon the conclusion of the second season in July 2010, rumors were widespread that The City would be cancelled. In October 2010, Port commented that "it doesn't really look like we're doing it anymore", with MTV later adding that the series would not be renewed for a third season.

== Episodes ==
Season	Episodes		Originally released	
Season	Episodes		First released	Last released
1	23	13	December 29, 2008	March 16, 2009
1	23	10	September 29, 2009	December 1, 2009
2	12		April 27, 2010	July 13, 2010

== Broadcast history and distribution ==
The City's first season commenced airing on December 29, 2008, one week after the fourth-season finale of The Hills. The series continued to air on Monday evenings until its midseason finale on March 16, 2009, at which point it had aired thirteen episodes. Rather than ordering an official second season, MTV included an additional ten episodes to the first season. The extension premiered on September 29, 2009, following the fifth-season extension premiere of The Hills, where both were moved to the Tuesday night timeslot, and both concluded on December 1, 2009. The second season premiered on April 27, 2010, after the sixth-season premiere of The Hills. Both programs held the Tuesday evening timeslot; both concluded after twelve episodes on July 13, 2010.

The City episodes aired regularly on MTV in the United States. All episodes are approximately thirty minutes, and were broadcast in standard definition. The series' episodes are also available for download at the iTunes Store. Episodes were previously available for viewing through the official MTV website, though they have since become unavailable since the series' conclusion. Since its debut, Paramount Pictures has released both seasons of The City onto DVD, to regions 1, 2, and 4. Each product includes all episodes of the respective season, in addition to deleted scenes and interviews of series personnel.
