= Olivia Palermo =

American socialite, fashion influencer, and entrepreneur

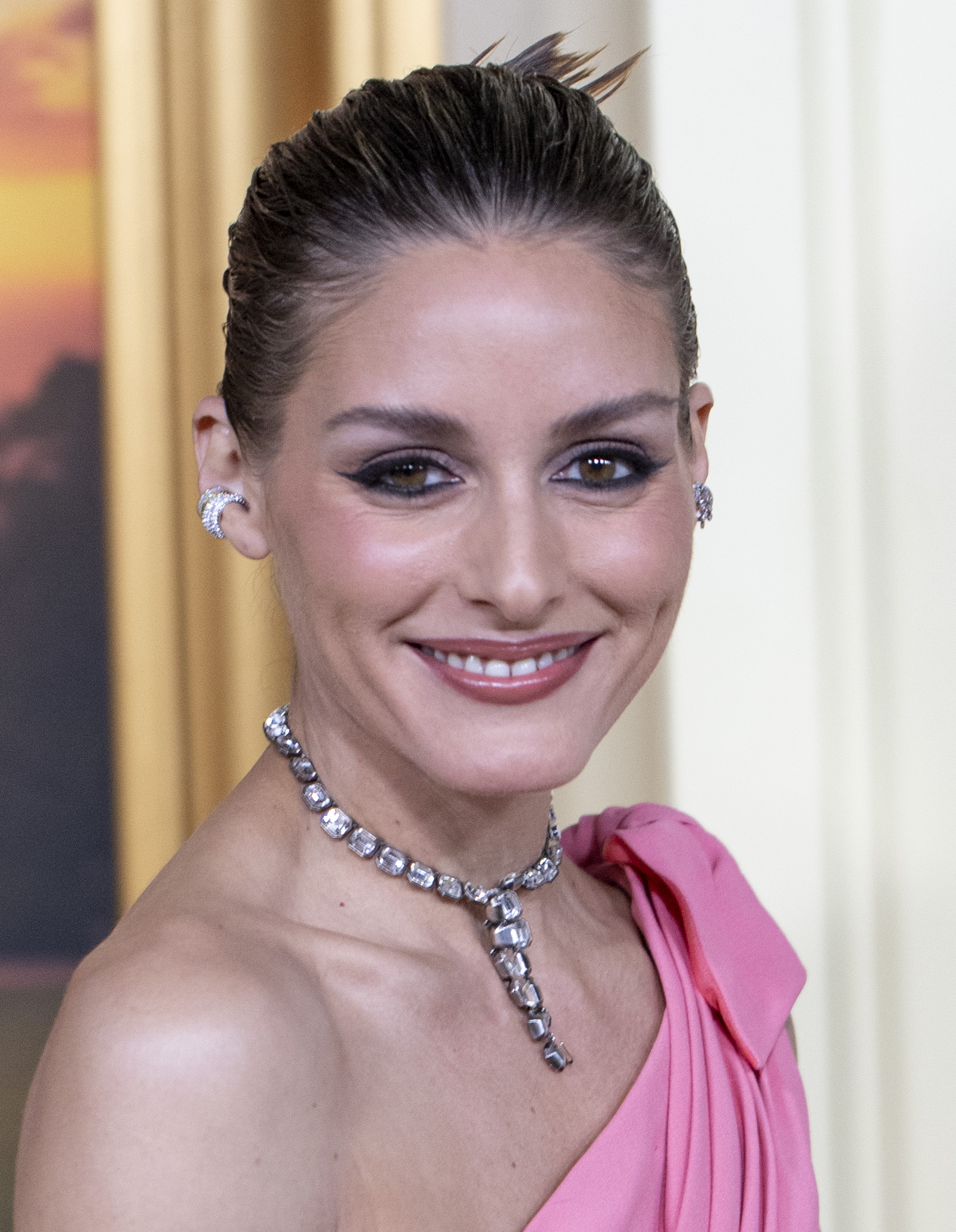
- Palermo in 2025
- Born: February 28, 1986 (age 40); New York City, U.S.
- Education: The New School
- Occupations: Fashion influencer; entrepreneur
- Spouse: Johannes Huebl (m. 2014)
- Website: www.oliviapalermo.com

Olivia Palermo (born February 28, 1986) is an American socialite, fashion influencer, entrepreneur, model and television personality.

== Early life ==
Olivia Palermo was born on February 28, 1986, in New York City. She was raised on the Upper East Side of Manhattan and in Greenwich, Connecticut. Her father worked as a real estate developer, and her mother was an interior designer. She has one younger brother, Grant.

Palermo attended the Nightingale-Bamford School in Manhattan for elementary education and St. Luke’s School in New Canaan, Connecticut, for high school. She later studied at the American University of Paris and The New School. She is of Italian descent and has a learning disability.

Early in her career, Palermo interned at Quest magazine. She was photographed by Patrick McMullan after being seen at a charity auction and began appearing in social event coverage. She became active in New York’s charity scene, joining the Friends Committee of New Yorkers For Children and serving on the committee for Operation Smile.

== Career ==
Palermo began her career as part of MTV's television show, The City. The series aired for two seasons from 2008 until 2010, and focused on the personal and professional lives of several young women residing in New York City. As part of the show, Palermo worked for Diane von Fürstenberg and later in the accessories department for Elle magazine.

In 2009, Palermo signed with the talent agency Wilhelmina International Inc. to focus full-time on development of her brand. She became a guest editor for the Gap's now-defunct Piperlime.com in 2011 and appeared as a guest judge on Project Runway Season 9. In 2010, Palermo modeled for the Autumn/Winter campaigns by Mango and Hogan. In October 2011, Palermo launched her personal website, which consists of editorial content about fashion, beauty and lifestyle written by full-time writers and contributing editors. She also appeared as a guest judge on Britain and Ireland's Next Top Model Season 7. Later in 2012, the New York Post named Palermo as the best dressed New Yorker of Page Six. Palermo appeared on the August 2018 cover of Glamour Mexico and has shot editorials for magazines, including Grazia Australia and ¡Hola! Fashion Magazine. She was also on the cover of Cosmopolitan, InStyle, Elle, Flare, Marie Claire, Arcadia, Lucky, Brides, Harper's Bazaar, L'Officiel, Tatler and Stella. Palermo has been the face of mid-range brands such as Aerin, Max&Co, and Banana Republic.

=== Co-branded partnerships ===
In 2010, Palermo launched a co-branded, limited jewelry collection with Roberta Freymann and became the face of the Mediterraneo collection by Spanish jewelry brand Carrera y Carrera. In August 2011, Palermo was invited by Stuart Weitzman to design a shoe for charity. Later in 2014, she designed a line of sunglasses for American brand Westward Leaning, and a percentage of each sale went to support the Association for Development, Alternative Commerce, and Micro Credits's Masaai Project. Also in 2014, Palermo collaborated with Italian shoe label Aquazzura on a line of footwear.

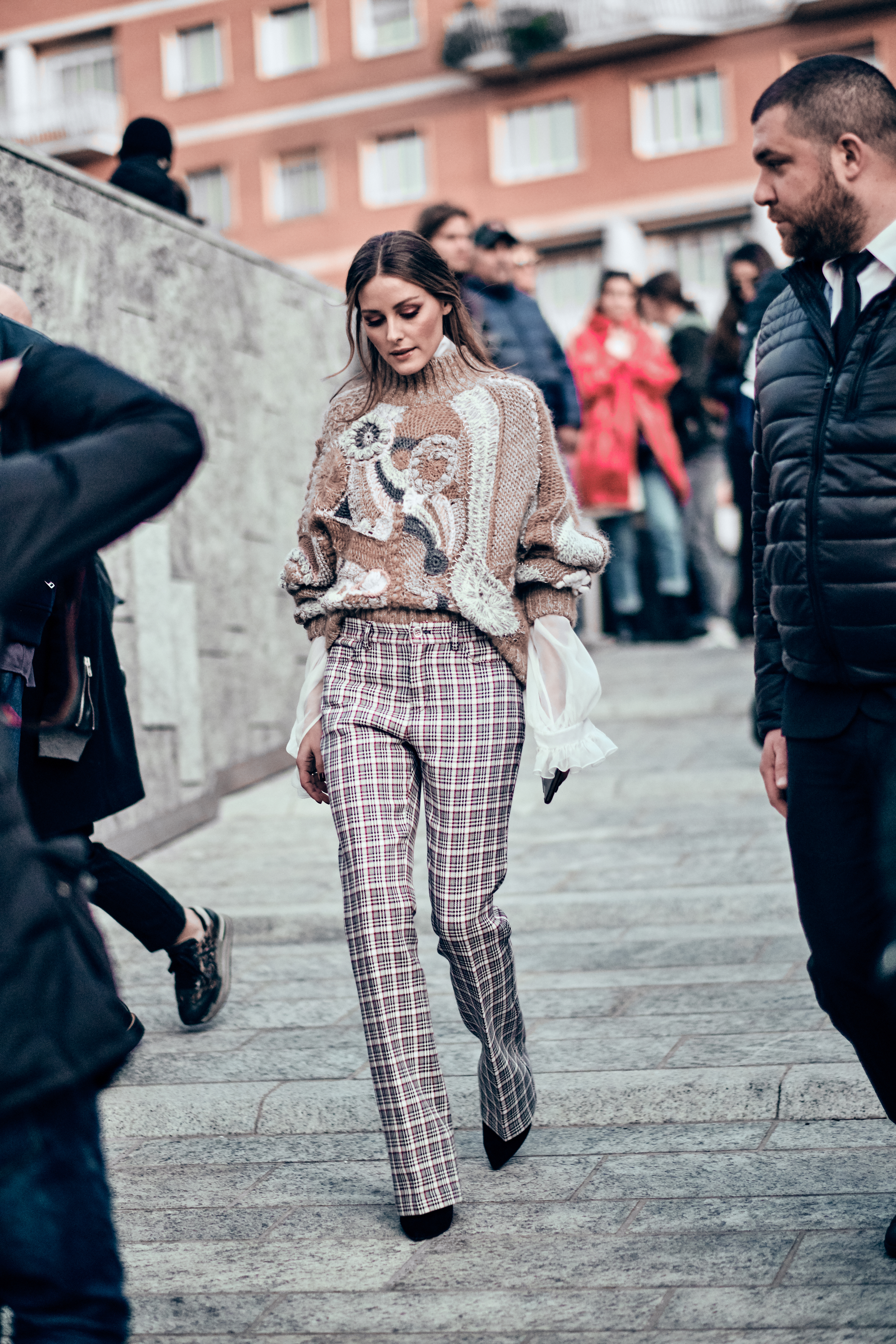
Palermo at Milan Fashion Week Autumn/Winter, 2019

In 2015, Palermo collaborated on collections with luxury leather and accessories brand Aspinal of London, the American jewelry and accessories brand Baublebar, and makeup company Ciaté London. Palermo's collaboration with Ciaté featured a line of makeup and nail polish, including a shade of red inspired by her mother. She went on to partner with Nordstrom on a fashion line in 2016 and with Banana Republic in 2017. In 2017, Palermo worked with accessory brand Meli Melo on a collection title, Severine. The London brand, known for their high-quality materials and craftsmanship, collaborated with Palermo to create a modern spin on a bucket bag. The bag, which came in five different shades, was modeled after the sculptural works of late architect and artist, Max Bill.

=== Olivia Palermo Beauty ===
In 2021, Palermo launched Olivia Palermo Beauty, a cosmetics and skincare brand. The line is vegan and cruelty-free, and its products are formulated without parabens, sulfates, phthalates, talc, mineral oil, or BHT. As of 2024, the brand continues to expand internationally through retail and online platforms.

=== Brand ambassadorships ===
Palermo was named the brand ambassador of the 2013 and 2014 Maasai Project for Pikolinos. In September 2016, Banana Republic announced Palermo as the brand's first Women's Global Style Ambassador through 2017.

== Personal life ==
Palermo married German model Johannes Huebl on June 28, 2014, in a private countryside ceremony in Bedford, New York.

== Filmography ==
Film and television roles
| Year | Title | Role | Notes |
|---|---|---|---|
| 2008–10 | The City | Herself | 35 episodes |
| 2011 | Britain's Next Top Model | Herself | Episode: "Episode #7.10" |
| 2011 | Project Runway | Herself / Guest Judge | Episode: "Sew '70s" |
| 2011 | The Smurfs | Party Guest | Film |
| 2023 | Gossip Girl (2021 TV Series) | Herself/Met Gala Attendee | Episode: “S2 E10: I Am Gossip Girl” |
