= Kelly Cutrone =

American publicist and businesswoman

Kelly Cutrone (born Kelly Blanding; c. 1965) is an American publicist, television personality and author.

== Early life and career beginnings ==
Kelly Cutrone was born and raised in Camillus, New York. Cutrone graduated from Syracuse University in 1986, whereupon she moved to New York City. She originally worked for publicist Susan Blond for a year; she followed this with a position as director of communications at Spin for Bob Guccione. Less than a year later, Cutrone founded the PR firm Cutrone & Weinberg with former Susan Blond intern, Jason Weinberg. Their clients included Eartha Kitt and Mark Ronson.

Cutrone has been married twice. At 21, she married artist Ronnie Cutrone, and at 28, actor Jeff Kober. Both marriages ended in a divorce. Cutrone has a daughter.

== People's Revolution ==
Having tired of the PR life, Cutrone sold her half of Cutrone & Weinberg to her co-founder and spent a year and a half as a tarot card reader. Cutrone founded the fashion PR firm People's Revolution in 1996.

On September 11, 2002, People's Revolution broke the record for the most shows produced in one day during New York Fashion Week.

== Television ==
Cutrone has appeared on three MTV shows: True Life; The Hills, on which she allowed Whitney Port and Lauren Conrad to film in her office; and The City, where she served as the professional and personal mentor to and consulted on Port's clothing line.

In February 2010, Cutrone executive produced Bravo's Kell on Earth, an eight-episode reality TV show about Cutrone and People's Revolution. The series followed Cutrone as she balanced running her own company and producing Fashion Weeks in New York and London with being a single mother.

In November 2010, Cutrone signed on as a contributor to the Dr. Phil Show.

In 2011, she became a judge on America's Next Top Model for seasons 18 to 22.

== Books and other media appearances ==
In February 2010, HarperOne, an imprint of HarperCollins, released Cutrone's memoir, If You Have to Cry, Go Outside: And Other Things Your Mother Never Told You. The book is co-authored by Meredith Bryan, and is a New York Times bestseller. Cutrone's second book, Normal Gets You Nowhere, was published on May 3, 2011.

Cutrone appeared in Terrence Malick's film, Knight of Cups, in 2016.

Cutrone has spoken at two TEDx events: at the University of Oxford's independent event, TEDxOxford, where she gave an 18-minute talk about her career; and at TEDxAmsterdamWomen, where she spoke about her journey as a woman in business.

== Published works ==
- If You Have to Cry, Go Outside: And Other Things Your Mother Never Told You (2010)
- Normal Gets You Nowhere (2011)
