= Hitmakers (2025 TV series) =

- Genre: Music docu-reality
- Created by: Adam DiVello
- Country of origin: United States
- Original language: English
- No. of seasons: 1
- No. of episodes: 6

Production
- Executive producer: Adam DiVello
- Running time: 31–52 minutes

Original release
- Network: Netflix
- Release: July 24, 2025

Hitmakers is a music docu-reality series that premiered on Netflix on July 24, 2025. It follows a group of songwriters and music producers brought together to write, produce and record demos for new songs that will be pitched to recording artists John Legend, Shaboozey, Usher and Lisa.

== Premise ==
A group of songwriters and music producers are brought together in a "songwriting camp" to write, produce and record demos for new songs that will be pitched to recording artists John Legend, Shaboozey, Usher and Lisa. They live together and work for a few days at a time in The Bahamas, Cabo San Lucas and Nashville, Tennessee, grouped in different combinations for each session. Each episode ends with a listening session where the participants present and critique their creations.

== Cast ==
The series participants are "proven hitmakers" who have written and/or produced songs for well-known artists and bands, including Beyoncé, Justin Bieber, BTS, Lee Brice, Chris Brown, Noah Cyrus, Drake, Equinox, Fifth Harmony, Nelly Furtado, Ariana Grande, Alicia Keys, Adam Lambert, Dua Lipa, Little Mix, Jennifer Lopez, Rita Ora, Parmalee, Katy Perry, Pharrell, Kelly Rowland, Ed Sheeran, Skrillex, Trey Songz and Usher. They are:

- Jenna Andrews
- Tommy Brown
- Trey Campbell
- Ferras
- Harv
- Ben Johnson
- Stephen Kirk
- JHart
- Whitney Phillips
- Sevyn Streeter
- Nova Wav, duo composed of Brittany “Chi” Coney and Denisia “Blu June” Andrews

== Episodes ==
No.	Title	Original release date
1	"Writing for a Legend"	July 24, 2025
2	"Breakdown in the Bahamas"	July 24, 2025
3	"A Shot with Shaboozey"	July 24, 2025
4	"Country Confessions"	July 24, 2025
5	"No More Kumbaya"	July 24, 2025
6	"Ending on an Upbeat"	July 24, 2025

== Production ==
Hitmakers was created and produced by Adam DiVello, who previously created the real estate-focused reality television series Selling Sunset.

== Reception ==
Steven J. Horowitz of Variety called Hitmakers "a well-intentioned and entertaining yet superficial look inside the hit factory", explaining that it depicts the luxury and glamour that can accompany the songwriting process, but shines little light on the more common realities, like sparse income. Arguing that the show "shines" in the songwriting sessions themselves, Horowitz wrote, "Each writer has his or her own strengths, and it’s like watching athletes at the top of their game reach across genre lines to hatch kernels of ideas into full-blooded songs. Hitmakers intends to show the human side of songwriting, and the writers clearly love their craft. Their excitement and glimpses of brilliance radiate off the screen as a song’s puzzle pieces come together".
