= Chrishell Stause =

American actress (born 1981)

- Stause in 2026
- Born: Terrina Chrishell Stause; July 21, 1981 (age 45); Draffenville, Kentucky, U.S.
- Education: Murray State University (BA)
- Occupations: Actress; Real estate agent
- Years active: 2003–present
- Known for: All My Children; Days of Our Lives
- Spouse: Justin Hartley (m. 2017; div. 2021)
- Partner: G Flip (2022–2026)
- Website: chrishell.com

Terrina Chrishell Stause (born July 21, 1981) is an American actress, television personality, and real estate agent. She began her career playing the role of Amanda Dillon in the ABC daytime soap opera All My Children (2005–2011). From 2013 to 2015, she starred as Jordan Ridgeway in the NBC soap opera, Days of Our Lives and later returned to the soap on a recurring basis. For this role, Stause received a Daytime Emmy Award nomination for Outstanding Guest Performer in a Drama Series in 2020. In 2019, Stause began starring in the Netflix reality series Selling Sunset.

== Early life ==
Stause was born on July 21, 1981 in Draffenville, Kentucky. She attended Murray State University, from which she received her B.A. in theater in 2003. Her middle name "Chrishell" is a portmanteau word created based on the unusual circumstances of her birth. Many claim that her mother went into labor at a Shell station, and an attendant named Chris helped deliver the baby. However, in her book, Stause denies parts of this, mentioning that her mother had car troubles and pulled into a gas station. While waiting, she went into pre-labor and the attendant genuinely helped her to reach a hospital, where Stause was born. Before knowing that she was pregnant, her mother broke up with Chrishell's biological father, who was half Japanese and half Spanish. Jeff was her stepfather. Stause missed a full year of middle school because she was forced to live in a tent. At that time, Stause mentioned washing her hair in the river, using food stamps and hiding her life from classmates. Her parents "struggled with addiction and mental health" and for a period joined the Worldwide Church of God when she was 10 years old. Her mother never had a steady job and Stause describes her as free spirited and self-righteous.

== Career ==
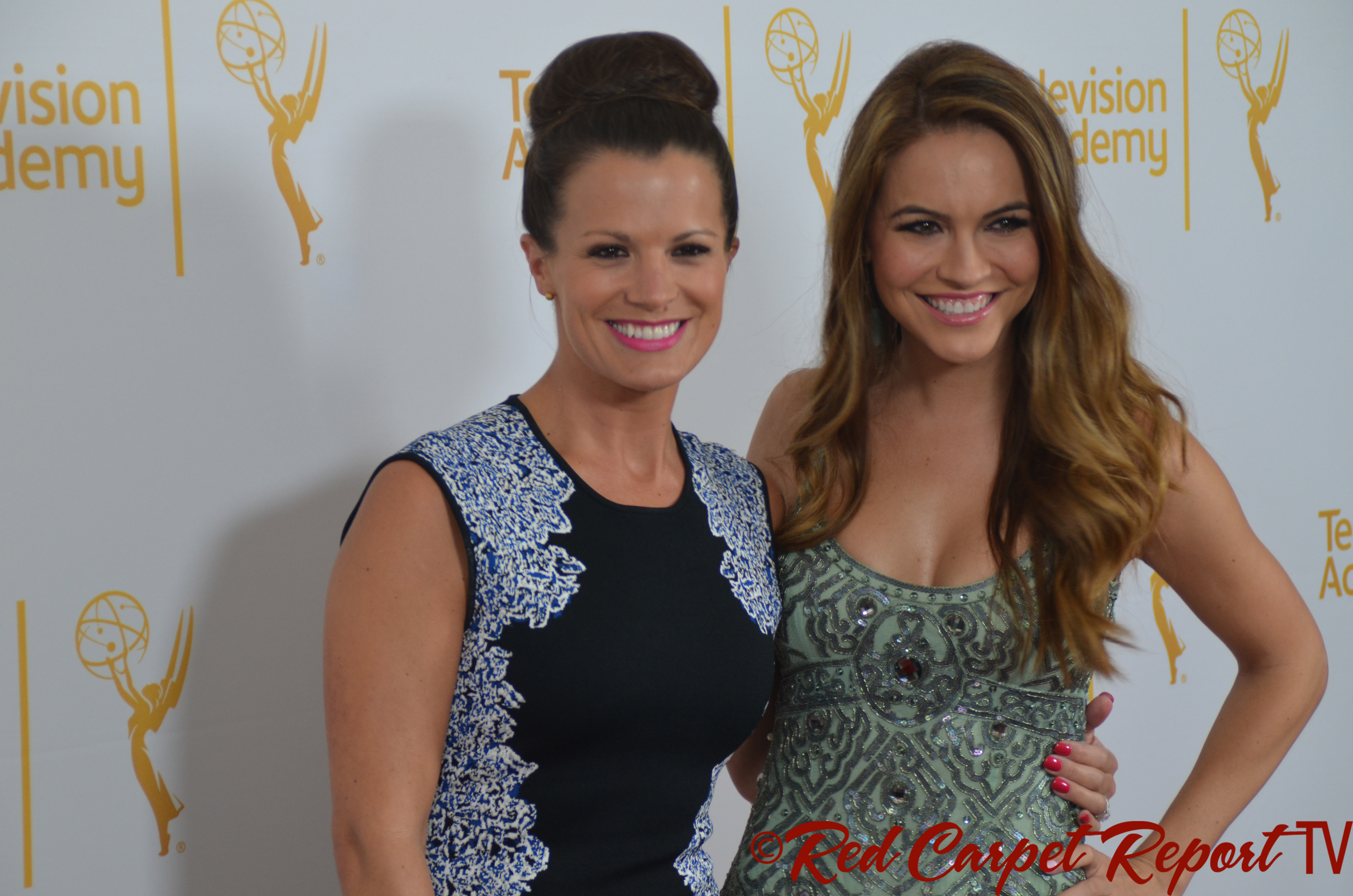
Melissa Claire Egan and Chrishell Stause at the 2014 Daytime Emmy Awards Nominees Cocktail Reception

In 2005, Stause was cast as Amanda Dillon in the ABC daytime soap opera, All My Children, a role she began on May 4, 2005, when the character returned to Pine Valley after a five-year absence. The role of Amanda was previously portrayed by Alexis Manta. During her time on soap, Stause also acted in the independent films Scaring the Fish (2008) and The Crimson Mask (2009). The soap was cancelled and ended on September 23, 2011. Following cancellation, Stause made her prime time television debut guest starring in the second season of the ABC crime comedy-drama series, Body of Proof. She was a member of improvisational troupe The Groundlings in Los Angeles.

In April 2013, it was announced that Stause had joined the cast of NBC soap opera, Days of Our Lives. Her character, Jordan Ridgeway, first appeared in Salem on August 15, 2013. On October 24, 2014, it was announced that Stause would be leaving the series in 2015.

In 2018, it was announced that Stause was reprising the role and would begin airing in February 2019. The character exited on November 11, 2019, and Stause briefly reprised the role during guest appearances on March 4 and July 20, 2020, and also on May 24–25, 2021. At the 47th Daytime Emmy Awards, Stause received nomination for Outstanding Guest Performer in a Drama Series.

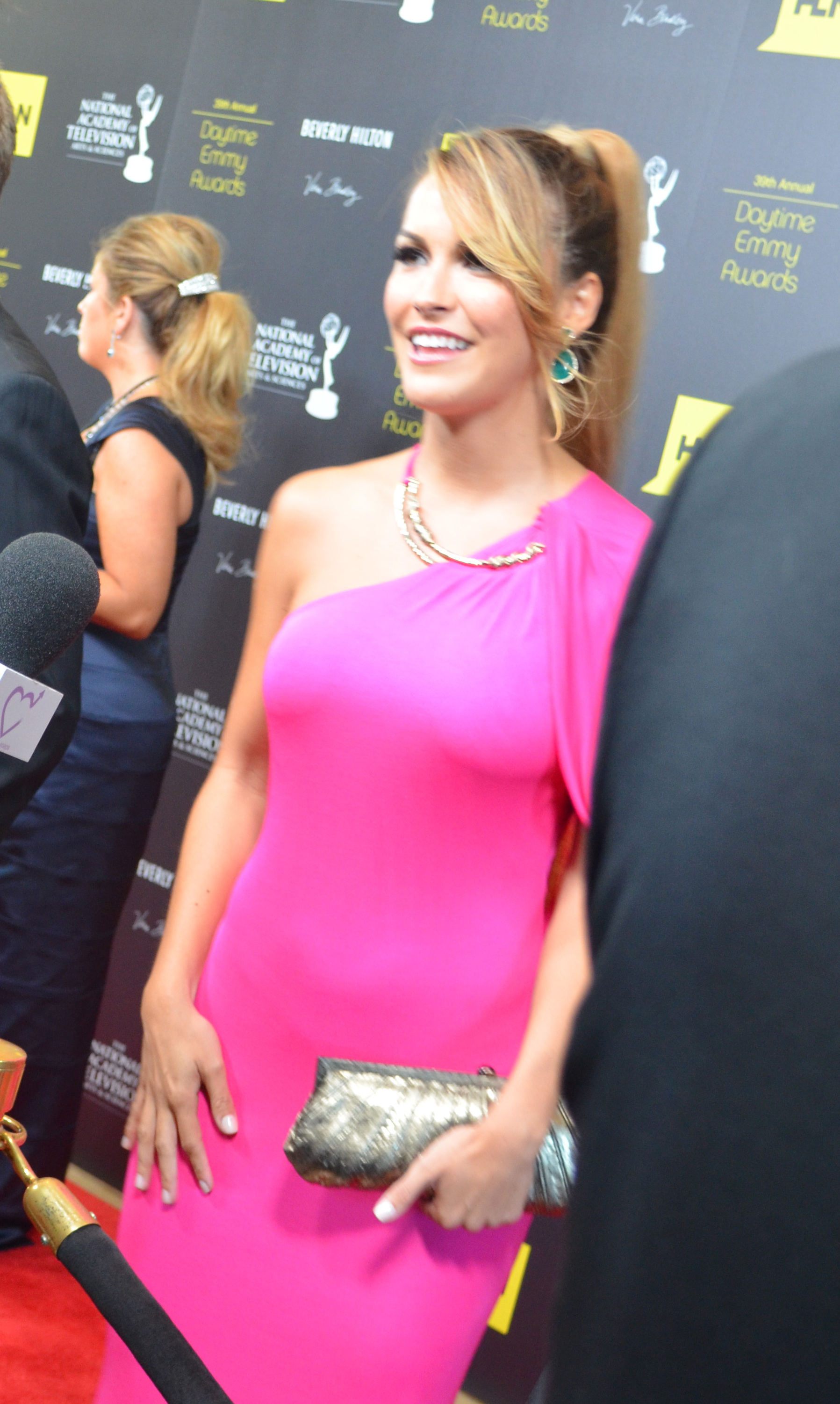
Stause at the Daytime Emmy Awards in 2012

In 2015, Stause guest-starred in the ABC prime time soapy drama series, Mistresses, and starred opposite Justin Hartley in the romantic comedy film, Another Time. From 2015 to 2016 she starred in the web-series, Youthful Daze. In April 2016, it was announced that Stause would be joining the cast of CBS soap opera The Young and the Restless as Bethany Bryant, debuting in late May. She last appeared on August 17, 2016. The following year she was cast in her first film leading role, in the thriller Eve of Abduction.

In addition to her acting career, Stause is also a real estate agent. Her work is showcased in Selling Sunset, a Netflix reality television show focused on The Oppenheim Group, a real estate brokerage dealing in luxury homes in L.A. In 2022 she received MTV Movie & TV Awards for Best Reality Star.

In 2019, Stause played the lead in the thriller film Staged Killer for Lifetime. On September 2, 2020, Stause was announced as one of the celebrities competing on the 29th season of Dancing with the Stars. She was eliminated in the eighth week of competition, getting to eighth place. In 2023, Stause returned to Lifetime with the leading roles in A Rose for Her Grave: The Randy Roth Story and You're Not Supposed to Be Here.

In May 2024, it was announced Stause had joined the cast of Australian soap opera Neighbours as Yasmine Shields.

== Personal life ==
Stause was engaged to Matthew Morrison from December 9, 2006, to 2007.

In January 2014, it was confirmed that Stause and Justin Hartley were dating and the couple announced their engagement in July 2016. The couple married in July 2017. In November 2019, Hartley filed for divorce, citing irreconcilable differences. Stause alleged that Hartley had let her know about the divorce by text only 45 minutes before the media broke the news. She filed for dissolution of marriage in December 2019 and disagreed with the July 8 separation date previously listed by Hartley. The divorce was finalized on February 22, 2021. She subsequently started dating Dancing with the Stars dancer Keo Motsepe from December 2020 to February 2021.

She announced via Instagram in July 2021 she had begun a romantic relationship with Selling Sunset co-star and boss Jason Oppenheim, which ended in December of the same year.

In May 2022, Stause confirmed a relationship with Australian musician Georgia Flipo, better known as G Flip. The couple started dating in March and secretly underwent a marriage ceremony in Las Vegas in July of that same year; however, the couple were not legally married. They did not share the news of their nuptials until May 2023. In July 2023, on their first anniversary, Chrishell and G Flip held another ceremony in Palm Springs. The couple shared that they plan to have a wedding every year on their anniversary. The couple announced their separation in October 2026, having still not legally married despite undergoing several ceremonies.

Both of Stause's parents died from lung cancer between 2019 and 2020. Stause has four sisters. Her oldest sister, Shonda, appeared on seasons 1, 3, 5 and 7 of Selling Sunset and resides in St. Louis.

== Filmography ==
Year	Title	Role	Notes
2005–11	All My Children	Amanda Dillon	Series regular
2008	Scaring the Fish	Robinu	
2009	The Crimson Mask	Jules	
2011	The Crimson Mask: Director's Cut	Jules	
2011	Body of Proof	Justine Befort	Episode: "Your Number's Up"
2012	Hot and Bothered	Payton	Short film
2013–15, 2019–21, 2023	Days of Our Lives	Jordan Ridgeway	Series regular (2013–15); recurring role (2019); guest role (2020–21, 2023)
2014	Meanwhile...	Party Girl	Episode: "What's a Banana Slug?"
2015–16	Youthful Daze	Zoey Miller	Series regular
2015	Misguided	Chrishell	Episode: "The Actresses"
2015	Another Time	Julia Practor	
2015	Mistresses	Yoga Woman	Episode: "Threesomes"
2016	The Young and the Restless	Bethany Bryant	Recurring role
2018	Eve of Abduction	Lila	
2019–2025	Selling Sunset	Herself	Main cast
2019	Staged Killer	Naomi	
2020	Dancing with the Stars	Herself	Contestant on season 29
2022	Bling Empire	Herself	Episode: "Crash and Burn"
2023	A Rose for Her Grave: The Randy Roth Story	Lori	Television film
2023	The L Word: Generation Q	Herself	Episode: "Looking Ahead"
2023	Is It Cake?	Herself / Judge	Episode: "Everything Is Cake!"
2023	You're Not Supposed to Be Here	Zoe	Television film
2024	Celebrity Family Food Battle	Herself	Episode: "Reality Star Showdown”
2024	Hot Frosty		Cameo
2024–2025	Neighbours	Yasmine Shields	Guest role; 16 episodes
2025	The Traitors	Herself	Season 3, Eliminated; 11th Place

== Awards and nominations ==
Year	Award	Category	Work	Result	Ref.
2020	Daytime Emmy Award	Outstanding Guest Performer in a Drama Series	Days of Our Lives	Nominated	
2020	Soap Hub Awards	Favorite Days of Our Lives Actress	Days of Our Lives	Nominated	
2021	MTV Movie & TV Awards	Best Fight (Unscripted)	Selling Sunset	Nominated	
2022	MTV Movie & TV Awards	Best Reality Star	Selling Sunset	Won	
2022	MTV Movie & TV Awards	Best Fight (Unscripted)	Selling Sunset	Nominated	
