= Patricia Bahia =

American musician

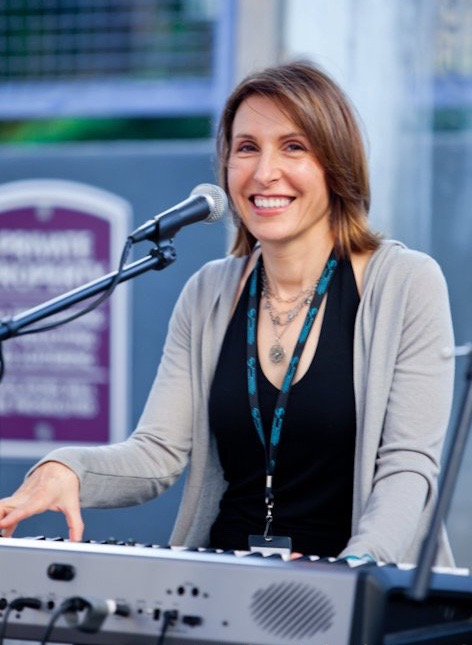
- Bahia at The Burbank Festival of Film, 2010

Background information
- Born: Patricia Bahia Nieuwenhuizen; St. Louis, Missouri U.S.
- Genres: Pop; pop rock; folk; soul; electronic
- Occupations: Singer; songwriter; musician; vocal producer
- Instruments: Vocals; piano; guitar
- Years active: 1989–present
- Member of: 7th & Hope
- Formerly of: Oakland Interfaith Gospel Choir
- Website: www.patriciabahia.com

Patricia Bahia is an American singer, songwriter, and musician. Her songs have aired on TV shows such as The Fosters, Nashville, Pretty Little Liars: The Perfectionists, and Riverdale, among others. In 2015, she was nominated for two L.A. Music Critic Awards: Best Pop Rock Artist (Female) and Best CD (Female). Bahia is an ovarian cancer survivor. Her songs, Every Day is a Gift, Great Day to Be Alive, and Keep the Light On, inspired in part by her cancer experience, have garnered two Positive Music Awards, the West Coast Songwriters International Song Contest's Grand Prize, and a Peace Song Award.

Bahia is a solo singer-songwriter and also writes, performs, and records with the musical duo, 7th & Hope.

== Early life and education ==
Patricia Bahia was born in St. Louis, Missouri to parents Maarten and Farah Nieuwenhuizen. Her father, a retired psychiatrist, is Dutch, and her mother, a retired art educator, is Persian.

As a child, Bahia sang in choirs, took dance, piano, and voice lessons, and played the clarinet. Her first public performance was a dance recital at age six on the paddle boat, the SS Admiral (1907), on the Mississippi river in St. Louis, Missouri.

She attended the Plan II Honors Program at The University of Texas at Austin, graduating Phi Beta Kappa. Her thesis was on the Women's Suffrage Movement for which she traveled to locate diaries and letters from Suffragettes. She attended the University of California, Hastings College of the Law in San Francisco. It was in law school that Bahia began singing again.

She worked for a number of years as an attorney, moonlighting as a jazz singer with a residency at Café Claude in San Francisco.

== Music career ==
Bahia is a founding member of the Oakland Interfaith Gospel Choir, with which she toured internationally and sang backing vocals on Linda Ronstadt's, Cry Like a Rainstorm, Howl Like the Wind album. She performed with the Choir until 2006.

In 2003, Bahia was diagnosed with ovarian cancer and decided to begin writing songs. She left her legal career and began studying the craft of songwriting. She started playing the piano again, learned to play the guitar, and began performing as a solo singer-songwriter. In 2010 she released an EP titled, Long Road Home and in 2015 she released a full-length album, Save Your Heart which received favorable reviews.

== Teaching and vocal coaching ==
Bahia coaches clients on vocal technique, performance, songwriting, and music licensing. Previously, she taught voice at the University of Southern California (USC) and voice and music business at the California State University, Los Angeles (CSULA).

Bahia holds an MM (Master of Music) degree in Commercial Music from the California State University, Los Angeles.

== Songs in film and television ==
Year	Production	Title	Artist	Role	Network	Ref
2022	Love is Blind	Get Ready (Here We Go)	JAKØHBI	Writer, Performer	Netflix	
2022	Love is Blind	I Got You	7th & Hope	Writer, Performer	Netflix	
2021	Selling Sunset	Queen Boss	Maté Maté featuring Queen Kei	Writer	Netflix	
2021	UFC Fight Island	Get Ready (Here We Go)	JAKØHBI	Writer, Performer	ESPN	
2021	Selling Tampa	Flex	7th & Hope	Writer, Performer	Netflix	
2021	Gentefied	Queen Boss	Maté Maté featuring Queen Kei	Writer	Netflix	
2021	The Hills: New Beginnings	Get Ready	7th & Hope	Writer, Performer	MTV	
2021	The Hills: New Beginnings	Luh Luh Love It	7th & Hope	Writer, Performer	MTV	
2021	Temptation Island	The Future is Female	Kali J.	Writer	USA Network	
2021	Burden of Truth	Warm	Echo Underground	Writer	NBC	
2020	Selling Sunset	Colors	7th & Hope	Writer, Performer	Netflix	
2020	Selling Sunset	Hello	7th & Hope	Writer, Performer	Netflix	
2020	Selling Sunset	Luh Luh Love It	7th & Hope	Writer, Performer	Netflix	
2020	Love & Hip Hop: New York	Queen Boss	Maté Maté	Writer	VH1	
2020	UFC 247	Unstoppable	Rakefire	Writer, Performer	ESPN	
2020	Matching Hearts	What You Waiting For?	7th & Hope	Writer, Performer	Hallmark Channel	
2020	Riverdale (2017 TV series)	Unstoppable	Rakefire	Writer, Performer	The CW	
2019	Ex on the Beach (American TV series)	Good To Be King	Maté Maté	Writer	MTV	
2019	Ex on the Beach (American TV series)	Queen Boss	Maté Maté	Writer	MTV	
2019	Selling Sunset	Born For This	7th & Hope	Writer, Performer	Netflix	
2019	Pretty Little Liars: The Perfectionists	Own It	I Am Orfa	Writer	Freeform (TV channel)	
2019	Good Witch (TV series)	No Bad Days	Katie Ferrara	Writer, Performer	Hallmark Channel	
2019	Siren (TV series)	Unstoppable	Rakefire	Writer, Performer	Freeform (TV channel)	
2019	Heartland (Canadian TV series)	My Heart Knows Where To Go	Mikey Wax	Writer, Performer	Canadian Broadcasting Corporation	
2019	Teen Mom 2	Keep Up The Fight	7th & Hope	Writer, Performer	MTV	
2019	Teen Mom 2	Luh, Luh, Love It	7th & Hope	Writer, Performer	MTV	
2019	Selling Sunset	Own It	I Am Orfa	Writer	Netflix	
2019	Teen Mom: Young and Pregnant	Hello	7th & Hope	Writer, Performer	MTV	
2018	Teen Mom OG	Friends Forever	7th & Hope	Writer, Performer	MTV	
2018	Music City (TV series)	Unstoppable	Rakefire	Writer, Performer	CMT (American TV channel)	
2018	Life Sentence (TV series)	Wild For You	Sleep Machine	Writer	The CW	
2018	Nashville (2012 TV series)	Flying With the Ashes	Keilana	Writer	CMT (American TV channel)	
2018	Teen Mom 2	What You Waiting For ?	7th & Hope	Writer, Performer	MTV	
2018	Teen Mom	Great Day To Be Alive	7th & Hope	Writer, Performer	MTV	
2018	Teen Mom OG	I Want It All	7th & Hope	Writer, Performer	MTV	
2018	The Price For Silence	Riot	Scarlet Wolves	Writer, Performer	Theaters	
2018	The Price For Silence	Waltz With The Devil	Rakefire	Writer, Performer	Theaters	
2018	Teen Mom OG	Unstoppable	Rakefire	Writer, Performer	MTV	
2018	Ex on the Beach (American TV series)	Good To Be King	Maté Maté	Writer	MTV	
2017	Famous in Love	Wild For You	Sleep Machine	Writer	MTV	
2017	Gone	Cover Me in Gold	Sleep Machine	Writer	NBC	
2016	The Fosters (American TV series)	Sorry I'm Not Sorry	Sleep Machine	Writer	Freeform (TV channel)	
2016	Heartbeat (2016 TV series)	Wild For You	Sleep Machine	Writer	Freeform (TV channel)	
2016	Younger (TV Series)	Cover Me In Gold	Sleep Machine	Writer	TV Land	
2015	The Fosters (American TV series)	Sorry I'm Not Sorry	Sleep Machine	Writer	Freeform (TV channel)	
2015	Younger (TV series) (Promo)	Wild For You	Sleep Machine	Writer	TV Land	
2015	Finding Carter	Hot Blooded Love	Sleep Machine	Writer	MTV	
2015	The Fosters (American TV series)	Wild For You	Sleep Machine	Writer	Freeform (TV channel)	
2015	Quantico (TV series) (Promo)	Wild For You	Sleep Machine	Writer	ABC	
2015	Switched at Birth (TV series)	Hot Blooded Love	Sleep Machine	Writer	Freeform (TV channel)	
2015	Finding Carter	Wild For You	Sleep Machine	Writer	MTV	
2015	Younger (TV series)	Wild For You	Sleep Machine	Writer	TV Land	
2015	Finding Carter	Stone	Sleep Machine	Writer	MTV	
2014	Finding Carter	Cover Me in Gold	Sleep Machine	Writer	MTV	

== Awards ==
In 2020 Bahia won a total of three Peace Song Awards including the grand prize award. In 2020 Bahia won two Positive Music Awards also known as "Posi" awards.

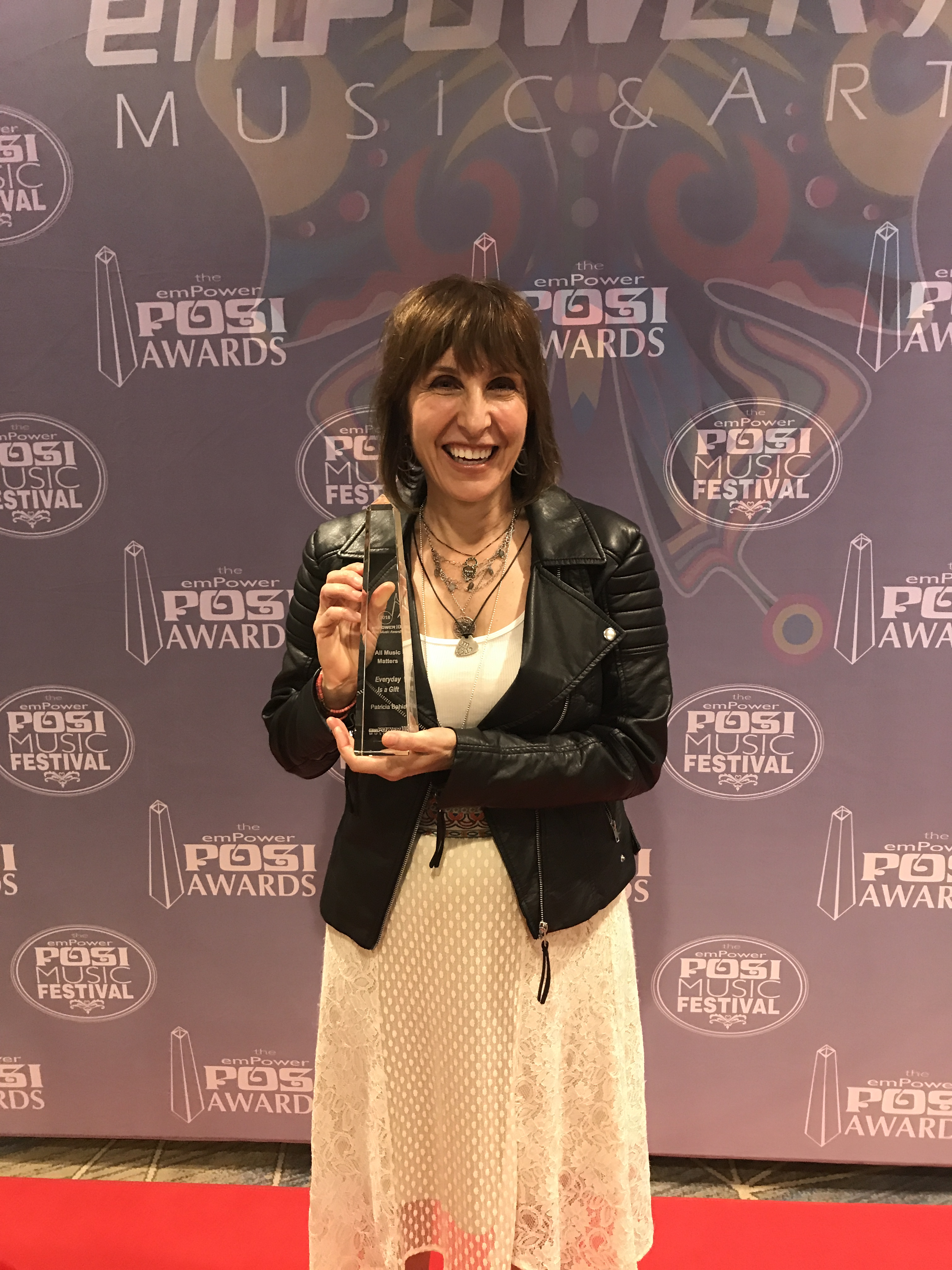
Bahia with Award at The Positive Music Festival, 2018

Year	Nominated work	Category	Result
2020	Every Heart One Love	Positive Music Award	Won
2020	(Say Yes) World With A Little More Love	Positive Music Award	Won
2020	Grand Prize Winner	Peace Song Award	Won
2020	Every Heart One Love - Rock & Pop	Peace Song Award	Won
2020	(Say Yes) World With A Little More Love - World Music	Peace Song Award	Won
2019	Keep The Light On	Peace Song Award	Won
2019	Keep The Light On	Positive Music Award	Won
2019	Everything's Gonna Be Alright	Positive Music Award	Nominated
2018	Great Day To Be Alive	West Coast Songwriters Int'l Song Contest Grand Prize	Won
2018	Every Day Is a Gift	Positive Music Award	Won
2017	Good Day	Positive Music Award	Nominated
2017	Why We Walk	Positive Music Award	Nominated
2015	Save Your Heart	L.A. Music Critic Award – Best CD	Nominated
2015	Patricia Bahia	L.A. Music Critic Award – Best Artist	Nominated

In 2020, Bahia's songs Every Heart One Love and It's All Good, were finalists in the John Lennon Songwriting Contest. In 2022, Bahia's song, It's All Good, was a finalist in the International Acoustic Music Awards.
