= House of Villains season 3 =

House of Villains
- Season 3
- Hosted by: Joel McHale
- No. of contestants: 11
- Winner: Drita D'Avanzo
- Runner-up: Christine Quinn
- No. of episodes: 10

Release
- Original network: Peacock
- Original release: February 26 – April 16, 2026

Season chronology
- ← Previous; Season 2

The third season of the television reality program House of Villains premiered on Peacock on February 26, 2026, and concluded on April 17, 2026. Joel McHale returns as host and features a cast of reality television's most memorable and notorious villains. Contestants live in a house while competing in challenges for power and safety, voting to banish each other until the last villain remaining wins a $200,000 cash prize and the title of America's Ultimate Supervillain. Drita D'Avanzo won the season, defeating Christine Quinn and Kate Chastain.

== Contestants ==
The cast of 11 reality show villains was announced on May 28, 2025.

Cast member	Original series	Finish
Drita D'Avanzo	Mob Wives	Winner
Christine Quinn	Selling Sunset	Runner-Up
Kate Chastain	Below Deck	3rd place
Tiffany "New York" Pollard	Flavor of Love 1 (Note: Pollard returned to the series, having previously competed on House of Villains 1 & 2.)	4th place
Paul Abrahamian	Big Brother 18	5th place
Tyson Apostol	Survivor: Tocantins	6th place
Tom Sandoval	Vanderpump Rules	7th place
Johnny Middlebrooks	Love Island USA 2	8th place
Ashley Mitchell	Real World: Ex-Plosion	9th place
Plane Jane	RuPaul's Drag Race 16	10th place
Jackie Christie	Basketball Wives LA	11th place

Notes

Former contestants Johnny Bananas, Victoria Larson, and Kandy Muse made guest appearances during the season.

== Voting history ==
Color key:

Winner
Runner-Up
3rd Place
Supervillain of the Week
Right Hand of the Supervillain
Hit List Nominee
Redemption Winner
Immune
Medically removed
Eliminated

	Episode							
	1/2/3	3/4	5/6	7/8/9	9	10		
Supervillain of the Week	Tyson	Johnny	Kate	Kate (Note: Joel left an envelope in the house which automatically put the last contestant who opened it by the next Battle Royale Challenge, Kate, on the Hit List. However, as Kate then won Supervillain of the Week, she was removed from the Hit List.)	Christine	Christine	—N/a	
Hit List Nominees	Christine; Jackie; Paul	Kate; Plane Jane; Tiffany	~~Ashley~~ (Note: As Ashley was medically removed from the game, Kate, as Supervillain of the Week, had to name a new nominee. She chose to nominate Tyson.); Johnny; Paul; Tyson	Christine; Tom; Tyson	Kate; Tyson	Drita; Paul; Tiffany	—N/a	
Redemption Winner	Paul	Kate	Tyson	Tyson	—N/a	Drita	—N/a	
Drita	Christine (Note: As the Supervillain of the Week was already determined, the winners of the episode 1 Battle Royale Challenge earned immunity from the Hit List.)	Tiffany	Paul	Tom	Tyson	No Vote (Note: For this round there was no banishment vote. Instead, whichever two villains remained on The Hit List after losing the Redemption Challenge were automatically banished.)	Winner (Episode 10)	
Christine	Hit List	Plane Jane	Johnny	Hit List	Supervillain of the Week	Supervillain of the Week	Runner-up (Episode 10)	
Kate	Jackie	Plane Jane	Supervillain of the Week	Tom (Note: As the vote was tied, the Supervillain of the Week cast the tie-breaker vote.)	Hit List	No Vote	Third place (Episode 10)	
Tiffany	Christine	Hit List	Johnny	Christine	Tyson	Banished (Episode 10)	Christine	
Paul	Christine	Right Hand; Supervillain (Note: In episode 3, Paul found the "Right Hand of the Supervillain" power, granting them the right to jointly decide the Hit List with the Supervillain of the Week.)	Hit List	Tom	Tyson	Banished (Episode 10)	Drita	
Tyson	Supervillain of the Week	Plane Jane	Johnny	Christine	Hit List	Banished (Episode 9)	Drita	
Tom	Jackie	Plane Jane	Johnny	Hit List	Banished (Episode 9)		Drita	
Johnny	Jackie	Supervillain of the Week	Hit List	Banished (Episode 6)			Drita	
Ashley	Jackie	Plane Jane	~~Hit List~~	Medically Removed (Episode 6)			Drita	
Plane Jane	Jackie	Hit List	Banished (Episode 4)				Drita	
Jackie	Hit List	Banished (Episode 3)					Drita	
Removed	none		Ashley	none				
Banished	Jackie; 5 of 8 votes to Banish	Plane Jane; 5 of 6 votes to Banish	Johnny; 4 of 5 votes to Banish	Tom; 3 of 5 votes to Banish	Tyson; 3 of 3 votes to Banish	Paul; Lost the Redemption Challenge	Kate; 0 of 8 votes to Win	Christine; 1 of 8 votes to Win
Banished	Jackie; 5 of 8 votes to Banish	Plane Jane; 5 of 6 votes to Banish	Johnny; 4 of 5 votes to Banish	Tom; 3 of 5 votes to Banish	Tyson; 3 of 3 votes to Banish	Tiffany; Lost the Redemption Challenge	Drita; 7 of 8 votes to Win	

== Episodes ==
No. overall	No. in season	Title	Original release date
22	1	"Third Time's the Charm"	February 26, 2026
On the first day, the contestants are presented with a lever and a ten-minute timer for someone to pull it, should they choose. Afterwards, it was revealed that the contestant who pulled the lever, Tyson, would become Supervillain of the Week.: Battle Royale Challenge (7 Deadly Sins): Played in two teams of five, with the Supervillain of the Week not competing. One at a time, each team member must complete a challenge inspired by one of the seven deadly sins: (1) finding a $100 bill in a money booth; (2) eating a cake; (3) smashing office supplies to find a picture of Joel McHale; (4) crying until a tear comes out; and (5) solving a puzzle. The first team to complete all five challenges wins immunity from the Hit List.
23	2	"When You've Got Nothing Left, You've Got Nothing To Lose"	February 26, 2026
Redemption Challenge (Bringing the Drama): In the morning, contestants watch a live soap opera scene. Afterwards, the challenge is announced, and contestants attempt to answer six multiple-choice questions about the scene. The contestant with the most correct answers wins.
24	3	"Let Them Spill Tea!"	February 26, 2026
Battle Royale Challenge (Toxic Tea Party): Each round, contestants are blindfolded and one contestant is randomly selected to "poison" another contestant by placing a cup of tea in front of them. Afterwards, the contestant with the tea tries to guess who placed it there. If they guess correctly, the contestant who assigned them the tea is eliminated from the challenge. However, they are eliminated if they guess incorrectly. Once two contestants remain, they have one minute to decide the Supervillain of the Week among themselves. If they cannot agree, the most-recently eliminated contestant from the challenge becomes Supervillain of the Week instead.
25	4	"I Hate All of These People"	March 5, 2026
Redemption Challenge (Know Thy Enemy): Contestants must feel the heads of the non-competing contestants through boxes, and attempt to identify the contestant in each box. The contestant with the most correct answers wins, with ties broken based on who completed the challenge the fastest.
26	5	"Loose Lips Sink Swan Boats"	March 12, 2026
Battle Royale Challenge (See No Evil Hear No Evil Speak No Evil): Played in three teams of three, with one team member gagged, one blindfolded, and one wearing deafening headphones. The gagged team member must mime provided instructions for three party-style challenges to the deafened team member, who then announces these instructions to the blindfolded team member so they can complete the challenges. The first team to finish then individually compete to become Supervillain of the Week, where they attempt to find a stuffed animal in a bouncy castle while wearing the blindfold, gag and headphones. The first contestant to find the stuffed animal wins.
27	6	"This Is Bananas"	March 19, 2026
Redemption Challenge (Minion Impossible): Contestants attempt to convince the non-competing contestants to complete six dares, worth varying amounts of points, on their behalf. Contestants may also complete one dare themselves. The contestant with the most points wins. In the case of a tie, a tiebreaker is held where contestants attempt to eat as many live hornworms as they can in one minute.
28	7	"The Nut House of Villains"	March 26, 2026
Battle Royale Challenge (Nut Jobs): Each contestant is given 30 nuts for the entire challenge. Each round, contestants privately choose to place a certain amount of nuts into a sack. The contestant(s) with the fewest nuts placed each round is eliminated from the challenge. The last contestant standing wins.
29	8	"I'm Sorry You Had to See This"	April 2, 2026
Redemption Challenge (Pipe Down): Working with a castmate from their former series, contestants must maneuver a ring through a wire loop game. Each time the ring touches the wire, contestants are sprayed with water and must restart. The first contestant to finish wins.
30	9	"Requiem for a Supervillain"	April 9, 2026
Battle Royale Challenge (Spitting Venom): Contestants suck "venom" out of a "snake" and spit it into another contestant's container at the opposite end of a room of foam. Contestants are eliminated from the challenge once their container is full. The last contestant standing wins.
31	10	"It Feels So Good To Be Hated"	April 16, 2026
Battle Royale Challenge (Screwed Over): Contestants attempt to hold onto a giant spinning screw for as long as possible. During the challenge, the previously eliminated contestants (who returned to be part of the jury) can each select one contestant to have their screw spin faster, making it more difficult for them. The last contestant standing wins.; Redemption Challenge (The Backstabbies): Before the challenge, all cast members (including the jury) filled out an awards ballot where they were asked to assign cast members to seven superlative categories. Contestants attempt to guess which cast member received the most nominations for each category. The contestant with the most correct answers wins and claims the final spot in the finale.
