= Selling the OC =

American reality television series

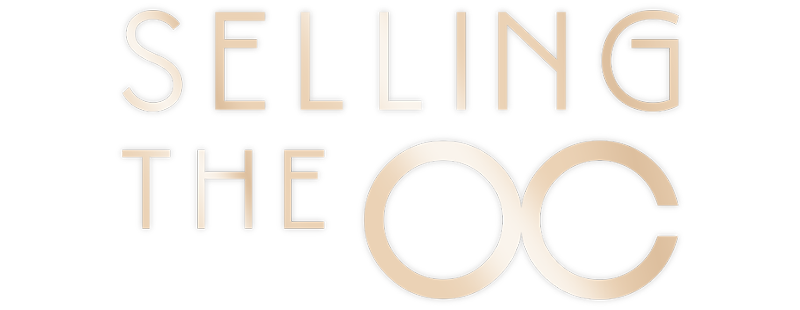
- Genre: Reality
- Created by: Adam DiVello
- Starring: Alexandra Jarvis; Alex Hall; Kayla Cardona; Gio Helou; Polly Brindle; Brandi Marshall; Jason Oppenheim; Alexandra Rose; Tyler Stanaland; Austin Victoria
- Country of origin: United States
- Original language: English
- No. of seasons: 4
- No. of episodes: 32

Production
- Camera setup: Multi-camera
- Running time: 28–47 minutes
- Production companies: Done and Done Productions; Lionsgate Television

Original release
- Network: Netflix
- Release: August 24, 2022 – November 12, 2025

Related
- Selling Sunset; Selling Tampa; Selling the City

Selling the OC is an American reality television series created for Netflix by Adam DiVello. It is the third series in the Selling Sunset franchise, and a direct spin-off of the original series. It revolves around the Oppenheim Group, a high-end real estate brokerage firm in the Orange County, California area (with offices in West Hollywood, Newport Beach and the La Jolla neighborhood of San Diego), and follows a group of agents as they navigate their personal and professional lives.

The first season premiered with eight episodes on August 24, 2022. The show was renewed for a second and third season on January 18, 2023. The second season premiered on September 8, 2023. The third season premiered on May 3, 2024. The show was renewed for a fourth season in January 2025 which premiered on November 12, 2025. In April 2026, the show was reported to have been put on an indefinite hiatus.

== Cast ==
- Jason Oppenheim, co-founder of the Oppenheim Group.
- Alex Hall, started out with an interior design career before becoming a realtor, mother of two children.
- Alexandra Harper, a Nashville native who is an aspiring realtor. (seasons 2-3)
- Alexandra Jarvis, she became a realtor after practicing business and employment law. (seasons 1-3)
- Alexandra Rose, she was the first realtor in the OC office and is now their top producing agent. (seasons 1-3)
- Brandi Marshall, before starting her 15-year career in real estate, Marshall worked as a Public Relations exec and now supports fundraising efforts for autism research, mother of two children.
- Gio Helou, in addition to luxury real estate, he previously worked in residential development, he now works in property development and produced a documentary film.
- Kayla Cardona, started her career in real estate with one of the top teams on Zillow in Orange County, where she won an award a few months into her career, mother of one child. (seasons 1-3)
- Lauren Shortt, a Southern California native who owned a small business in the LA suburbs before moving to the OC. (seasons 1-3)
- Polly Brindle, British-born Polly is a former model who worked in Europe for over two decades.
- Sean Palmieri, started his real estate career in South Florida, where he grew up, before moving to California in 2018. (seasons 1-3)
- Austin Victoria, a model and father of twin girls who became a realtor in 2017.
- Ashtyn Zerboni, a model and an actor, with a degree in biology, real estate agent in La Jolla and Orange County, mother of one child.
- Fiona Belle, youngest member of Selling the OC, joined in 2024.
- Kaylee Ricciardi, studied psychology and neuroscience, previously managed luxury short-term rentals during Coachella, has over 13 years of real estate experience.
- Tyler Stanaland, fifth-generation realtor Stanaland got his license at 18 and worked with his family business for 12 years.

Jarvis and Stanaland left the Oppenheim Group after filming the third season. Jarvis, Harper, Rose, Palmieri, Cardona and Shortt do not appear in season 4.

=== Timeline of cast members ===
Cast member	Seasons			
Cast member	1	2	3	4
Jason Oppenheim	Main	Main	Main	Main
Polly Brindle	Main	Main	Main	Main
Alex Hall	Main	Main	Main	Main
Gio Helou	Main	Main	Main	Main
Brandi Marshall	Main	Main	Main	Main
Tyler Stanaland	Main	Main	Main	Main
Austin Victoria	Main	Main	Main	Main
Kayla Cardona	Main	Main	Main	
Alexandra Jarvis	Main	Main	Main	
Alexandra Rose	Main	Main	Main	
Alexandra Harper		Main	Main	
Sean Palmieri	Recurring	Recurring	Main	
Fiona Belle				Main
Kaylee Ricciardi				Main
Ashtyn Zerboni				Main
Recurring cast members
Brett Oppenheim	Recurring	Recurring	Recurring	
Lauren Shortt	Recurring	Recurring	Recurring	

== Episodes ==
Series overview
Season	Episodes	Originally released
1	8	August 24, 2022
2	8	September 8, 2023
3	8	May 3, 2024
4	8	November 12, 2025

=== Season 1 (2022) ===
No. overall	No. in season	Title	Original release date
1	1	"Paradise Comes with a Price"	August 24, 2022
Alex Hall takes new agent Kayla under her wing. At the office launch party, tension between Alexandra Rose and the other agents boils over.
2	2	"Them Tables... They Turn"	August 24, 2022
Gio hosts a brokers' open house, where he raises an issue with Alex. Three agents celebrate a triple birthday. Brandi works with a retired NBA player.
3	3	"Testing the Waters"	August 24, 2022
Trying to reel in her first listing, Kayla turns to Alex for help. Rose and Jarvis work a promising new lead. Alex and Gio butt heads at the beach.
4	4	"A Not So Happy Hour"	August 24, 2022
Kayla, struggling to balance everything, doesn't get much sympathy from Polly. Alex closes a deal. Austin's lifestyle puts pressure on his marriage.
5	5	"An Off-Market Offer"	August 24, 2022
Scandal sweeps through the office after Kayla crosses a line. Alex and Jason tour a $105 million stunner while Polly shows Gio's client a fixer upper.
6	6	"Co-listing Chaos"	August 24, 2022
Tyler and Kayla clear the air, but Alex isn't ready to move on. Polly works with Gio to make a big sale. Rose opens up about her difficult childhood.
7	7	"Upping the Ante"	August 24, 2022
Polly and Jarvis struggle to keep things civil. Tyler shows his first big listing. Gio hosts a poker night where drama erupts between office cliques.
8	8	"Turning Tides"	August 24, 2022
Kayla tries to keep things on track with a difficult client. At a yacht party for the team, fun in the sun gives way to an explosive personality clash.

=== Season 2 (2023) ===
No. overall	No. in season	Title	Original release date
9	1	"Back on the Market"	September 8, 2023
Brandi offers a hot take on a hot topic after Tyler's divorce sparks speculation at the office. Cracks begin to show in the Alexandras' alliance.
10	2	"The Elephant in the Office"	September 8, 2023
A fresh new face from Nashville makes an entrance. After Kayla spreads explosive news, tempers flare at Gio's over-the-top sales milestone party.
11	3	"The Ring Collector"	September 8, 2023
Polly pitches Ali to Jason as a new addition to the team. Alex Hall tours Tyler's childhood home, then serves up a pasta dinner with a side of gossip.
12	4	"Every Rose Has Its Thorn"	September 8, 2023
Ready to get some distance from an old ally, Jarvis connects with Ali. Kayla and Brandi talk motherhood and more. Alex accuses Rose of shady behavior.
13	5	"Travel Troubles"	September 8, 2023
As the team arrives in Cabo prepared to party, an unresolved issue between Alex and Brandi causes fresh trouble. Ali flies home for a heart-to-heart.
14	6	"Rough Waters"	September 8, 2023
Business and pleasure make a messy mix as the agents tour beachfront listings and relax on a yacht, before an explosive argument interrupts the fun.
15	7	"Sex, Lies, and iPhone Footage"	September 8, 2023
Austin, Gio and Brandi turn to their families as they navigate change and challenges. A scandalous new secret surfaces after a team meeting devolves.
16	8	"Closing The Deal"	September 8, 2023
Rose takes a few hits when she invites the team to help demo a tear-down. At Polly's birthday party, guests share big announcements — and big feelings.

=== Season 3 (2024) ===
No. overall	No. in season	Title	Original release date
17	1	"Big Dock Energy"	May 3, 2024
The stakes and emotions are high as Kayla throws an extravagant broker preview for a game-changing listing, drawing the ire of top-selling agent Gio.
18	2	"A Bond-Fire"	May 3, 2024
After a bonfire ignites simmering tensions, the group lets off steam at the grand opening party for the San Diego office, but not without some gossip.
19	3	"Offer Not Accepted"	May 3, 2024
Alex keeps a tight lip on her evolving situation with Tyler as Sean speaks his truth. When a rumor spreads, a blowup between agents erupts in the office.
20	4	"High Stakes and Heartache"	May 3, 2024
Polly celebrates a huge closing. Sean and Austin confide in the other agents after the office outburst. Alex and Tyler struggle to get on the same page.
21	5	"Reactions Have Consequences"	May 3, 2024
Alex's podcast interview puts the women on edge. Brandi makes a bold proposal. Austin banks his future plans on the sale of a lucrative listing.
22	6	"Door's Always Open"	May 3, 2024
Tyler helps with his dad's $50 million listing. Polly gives Ali feedback about her behavior at an open house. Alex tries to clear the air with Kayla.
23	7	"Unfinished Business"	May 3, 2024
When a prior commitment sidelines Gio, he takes a chance on Ali to host the showing. Jason pairs Polly with Brandi to help a sports client find a home.
24	8	"Talk Derby to Me"	May 3, 2024
Kayla feels the pressure to close on her biggest listing. Ali's performance at Gio's open house raises concerns. In Del Mar, a team outing goes sideways.

=== Season 4 (2025) ===
No. overall	No. in season	Title	Original release date
25	1	"Last Alex Standing"	November 12, 2025
Three new faces from San Diego join the effort to make the OC the highest grossing branch within the O Group - but some agents question their motives.
26	2	"Full-Frontal Views"	November 12, 2025
Jason announces he'll award the listing for his personal investment property to one lucky agent. Kaylee ruffles feathers with a controversial new client.
27	3	"Not The Other Woman"	November 12, 2025
Gio makes career moves with a broker's open. As Polly dips her toes into the dating scene, Alex and Tyler come face to face.
28	4	"Hall's Fair in Love and War"	November 12, 2025
Drama pops off when the agents gather in Palm Springs to celebrate Gio's birthday. Shady sidebars spark tempers, making dinner an explosive affair.
29	5	"Hibachi Hot Seat"	November 12, 2025
The team tries to rally after a blowout night, but the desert is far from an oasis as tension brews; Alex does damage control.
30	6	"Seeking Arrangements"	November 12, 2025
On the cusp of Polly's birthday, Alex fears their friendship will never be the same. As Austin bares all, Fiona drops a bombshell about another agent.
31	7	"Secrets, Sage and Sandcastle"	November 12, 2025
Polly pulls out all the stops at a broker's open, but the real show happens off-market when Ashtyn relays a red-hot rumor about Alex at her baby shower.
32	8	"Trash Takes Itself Out"	November 12, 2025
Fiona shores up receipts. Polly and Luke make a splash. At the brokerage bash, Jason reveals which agent will win his coveted Cypress listing.

== Production ==
In November 2021, Selling the OC was announced as a second spin-off of the Netflix series Selling Sunset. Filming occurred between November 2021 and March 2022. In January 2023, Netflix renewed the series for a second and third season. In January 2025, Netflix renewed the series for a fourth season.
