= 7th & Hope =

American and English musical duo

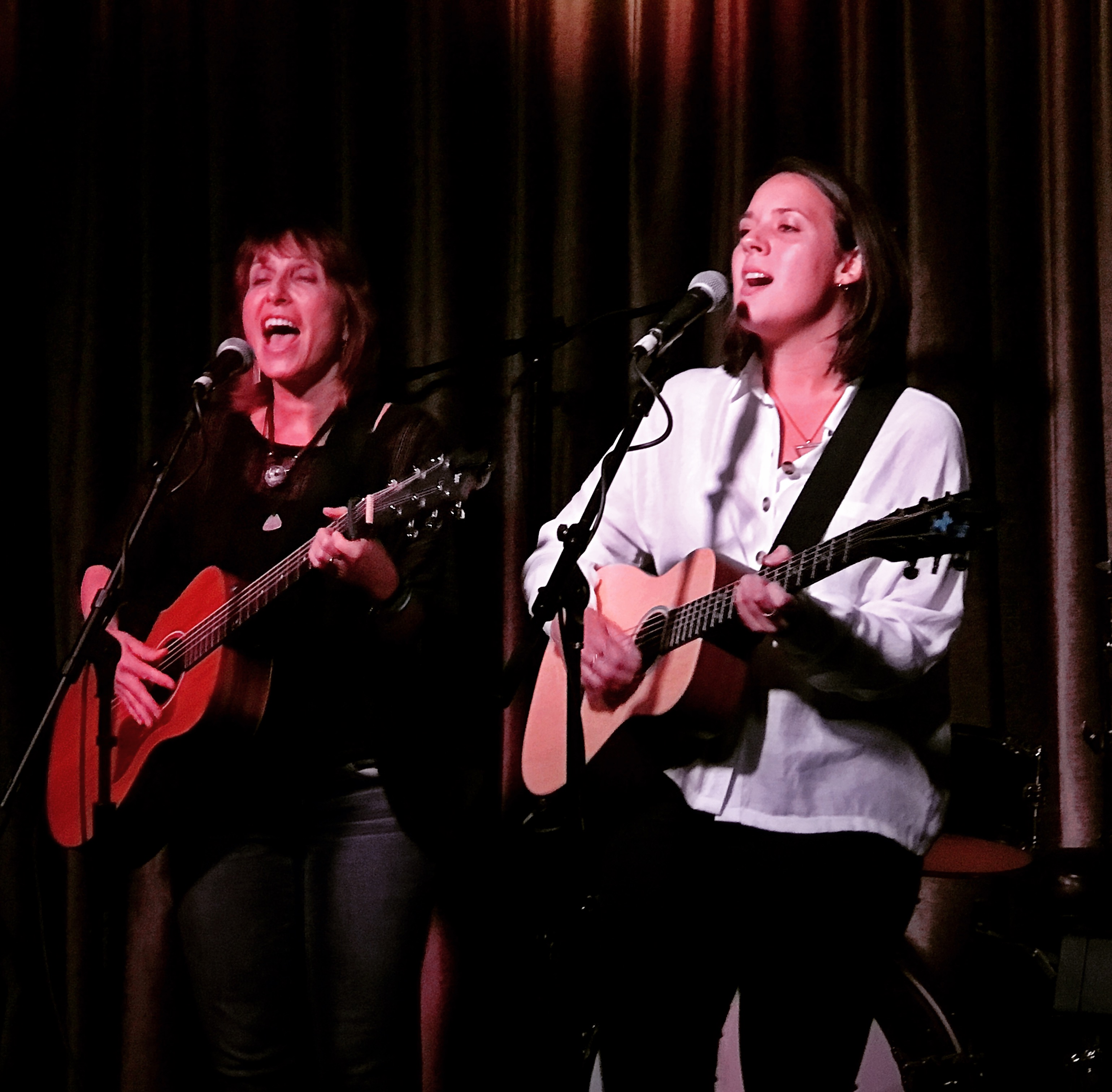
- 7th & Hope at Hotel Café, 2018

Background information
- Origin: Los Angeles, California, U.S.
- Genres: Electronic; pop; indie pop
- Years active: 2016–present
- Members: Patricia Bahia; Betty Lawrence

7th & Hope is a musical duo composed of founding members, American singer-songwriter, Patricia Bahia, and English singer-songwriter, Betty Lawrence. Their songs, "Great Day To Be Alive" and "Keep The Light On", have been recognized with a Positive Music Award and a Peace Song Award in 2019, The WCS International Songwriting Contest Grand Prize in 2018, and as a finalist in the John Lennon Songwriting Contest in 2017 and 2018. Their songs have been featured on Netflix, The Hallmark Channel, and MTV, among others.

== Songs in film and television ==
| Year | Production | Title | Role | Network |
|---|---|---|---|---|
| 2020 | Selling Sunset | "Colors" | Writer, Performer | Netflix |
| 2020 | Selling Sunset | "Hello" | Writer, Performer | Netflix |
| 2020 | Selling Sunset | "Luh Luh Love It" | Writer, Performer | Netflix |
| 2020 | Matching Hearts | "What You Waiting For?" | Writer, Performer | Hallmark Channel |
| 2019 | Selling Sunset | "Born For This" | Writer, Performer | Netflix |
| 2019 | Teen Mom 2 | "Keep Up The Fight" | Writer, Performer | MTV |
| 2019 | Teen Mom: Young and Pregnant | "Hello" | Writer, Performer | MTV |
| 2019 | Teen Mom 2 | "Luh, Luh, Love It" | Writer, Performer | MTV |
| 2018 | Teen Mom OG | "Friends Forever" | Writer, Performer | MTV |
| 2018 | Teen Mom 2 | "What You Waiting For ?" | Writer, Performer | MTV |
| 2018 | Teen Mom | "Great Day To Be Alive" | Writer, Performer | MTV |
| 2018 | Teen Mom OG | "I Want It All" | Writer, Performer | MTV |

== Awards ==
| Year | Nominee / work | Award | Result |
|---|---|---|---|
| 2019 | "Keep The Light On" | Peace Song Award | Won |
| 2019 | "Keep The Light On" | Positive Music Award | Won |
| 2019 | "Everything's Gonna Be Alright" | Positive Music Award | Nominated |
| 2018 | "Great Day To Be Alive" | WCS Int'l Songwriting Contest Grand Prize | Won |
