= Youthful Daze =

- Genre: Drama; Thriller
- Created by: Bryan James
- Starring: Bryan James; Mike C. Manning; Chrishell Stause; Ash McNair
- Country of origin: United States
- Original language: English
- No. of seasons: 6
- No. of episodes: 212

Production
- Executive producers: Conor Beesemyer; Bryan James; Yara Estrada; Jessica Osgood
- Production location: Los Angeles, California

Original release
- Network: Vimeo
- Release: October 7, 2012

Youthful Daze is a web series originally released on Vimeo. The series stars Bryan James, Jen Lilley, and Chrishell Stause.

== Premise ==
The series follows character Drew Castle, who has a split personality persona Joshua, in Calabasas, California.

== Production ==
The series was created by Bryan James and based on Beverly Hills 90210, his favorite childhood show. Season five premiered in February 2016.

Reality television star Scott Disick appeared on two episodes of the series.

== Awards and nominations ==
In 2016, Rick Hearst earned the show's first Daytime Emmy nomination.

Awards and nominations for Youthful Daze
| Year | Award | Category | Recipient(s) | Result |
|---|---|---|---|---|
| 2015 | Daytime Emmy | Outstanding Actor in a Digital Daytime Drama Series | Rick Hearst | Nominated |
| 2016 | Indie Series Award | Best Lead Actress – Drama | Jen Lilley | Nominated |
