= Selling the City (TV series) =

2024 Netflix reality series

- Title card
- Genre: Reality
- Country of origin: United States
- Original language: English
- No. of series: 1
- No. of episodes: 8

Production
- Camera setup: Multi-camera
- Running time: 29–44 minutes
- Production companies: Done and Done Productions

Original release
- Network: Netflix
- Release: January 3, 2025

Related
- Selling Sunset; Selling Tampa; Selling the OC

Selling the City is a reality television series, produced by Adam DiVello which premiered on Netflix on January 3, 2025. It is the fourth series in the Selling Sunset franchise.

== Format ==
The series follows eight realtors in New York City, six women and two men, who mainly work for Douglas Elliman, one of the largest real estate brokerages in the U.S. The series takes viewers inside New York's luxury housing market from the POV of elite, New York City–based agents.

== Cast ==
=== Timeline of cast members ===
Cast member	Season
Cast member	1
Eleonora Srugo	Main
Jade Chan	Main
Abigail Godfrey	Main
Steve Gold	Main
Gisselle Meneses Nunez	Main
Taylor Middleton Scavo	Main
Jordyn Taylor Braff	Main
Justin Tuinstra	Main

- Eleonora Srugo, team leader at Douglas Elliman who builds her own team. In 2023, she had the largest sale of the year, over $75 million, founded a volunteer based mentorship program for high school students.
- Jade Chan, an old friend of Eleonora's and one of Douglas Elliman's top individual agents. Currently, she is director of sales at The Mandarin Oriental Residences Fifth Avenue, prior to real estate she worked in public relations.
- Abigail Godfrey, the newest member of Eleonora's team, eager to prove herself, she works with St.Jude Children's Research Hospital and Clemson Young Alumni Association.
- Steve Gold, a former model turned broker at The Corcoran Group and a friend of Eleonora's, previously featured on Bravo's Million Dollar Listing New York, father of one child.
- Gisselle Meneses Nunez, an employee at Douglas Elliman since 2022, previously worked at the New Jersey based J Agency and has some experience in auto leasing and sales, mother of one child.
- Taylor Middleton Scavo, the most successful member of Eleonora's team.
- Jordyn Taylor Braff, from California, she formerly was in a relationship with Trevor Noah and previously worked in the entertainment industry, she started a foundation called 12 Months of Giving and an ambassador for Room to Grow.
- Justin Tuinstra, an employee at Douglas Elliman since 2011, Chan claims he had previously been in a relationship with Srugo.

== Episodes ==
Season	Episodes	Originally released
1	8	January 3, 2025

=== Season 1 (2025) ===
No. overall	No. in season	Title	Original release date
1	1	"Workin' for a Birkin"	January 3, 2025
2	2	"Troubles in Tribeca"	January 3, 2025
3	3	"Not the City of Angles..."	January 3, 2025
4	4	"Coming for the House"	January 3, 2025
5	5	"A DUMDO Dilemma"	January 3, 2025
6	6	"A Marriage of Convenience"	January 3, 2025
7	7	"New York or Nowhere"	January 3, 2025
8	8	"Best and Final"	January 3, 2025

== Production ==
=== Release ===
A trailer for the show was released in December 2024.

Writing for Decider, Liz Kocan recommended it writing, Selling The City offers "new, refreshing office dynamics and, set against the backdrop of luxe Manhattan penthouses. The show's success lies with its cast, who provide plenty of semi-manufactured, yet somehow they still feel authentic."
