= Adam DiVello =

American television producer

Adam DiVello is an American television producer. He was a senior production and development executive at MTV where he developed and executive produced Laguna Beach: The Real Orange County. DiVello left the network in 2007 to form his own company, Done and Done Productions. DiVello created and ran MTV's reality television series, The Hills under his own banner, Done and Done Productions.

In 2008, DiVello also created The City, a spin-off of The Hills. DiVello served as show runner and executive producer of both The Hills and The City for MTV, until they both ended in 2010.

In 2018, DiVello produced the Nashville-based reality series Music City for CMT. The series ended after two seasons on January 31, 2019.

Since 2019, DiVello has produced Selling Sunset for Netflix, which focuses on the lives of a group of real estate agents in Los Angeles.

He also produced the pilots First Year, which focused on the lives of young ER doctors, and Santa Barbara. In 2025 he produced a spin-off of Selling Sunset, Selling the City. Also directed for Netflix Hitmakers 2025

== Awards and nominations ==
- Primetime Emmy Award for Outstanding Unstructured Reality Program (Selling Sunset) – nominated (2021, 2022, 2023).
