= Pre-labor =

- Other names: Prodromal labor
- Specialty: Obstetrics

Pre-labor consists of the early signs before labor starts. It is the body's preparation for real labor.

Prodromal labor has been misnamed as “false labor." Prodromal labor begins much as traditional labor but does not progress to the birth of the baby. Not everyone feels this stage of labor, though it does always occur. However, this does not mean that every woman will experience every symptom. The term is used to describe a cluster of physical changes that may take place in a pregnant woman before she goes into "real" labor, such as an increase in blood volume (sometimes resulting in edema), Braxton Hicks contractions, the presence of colostrum in the breasts, and the dislodging of the mucus plug that has sealed the cervix during the pregnancy.

The term "false labor" is sometimes used to describe a cluster of Braxton Hicks contractions that are mistaken for real labor.

The term "false labor" and "false pains" are sometimes considered equivalent.
