= Christine Quinn (actor) =

American real estate agent and television personality (born 1988)

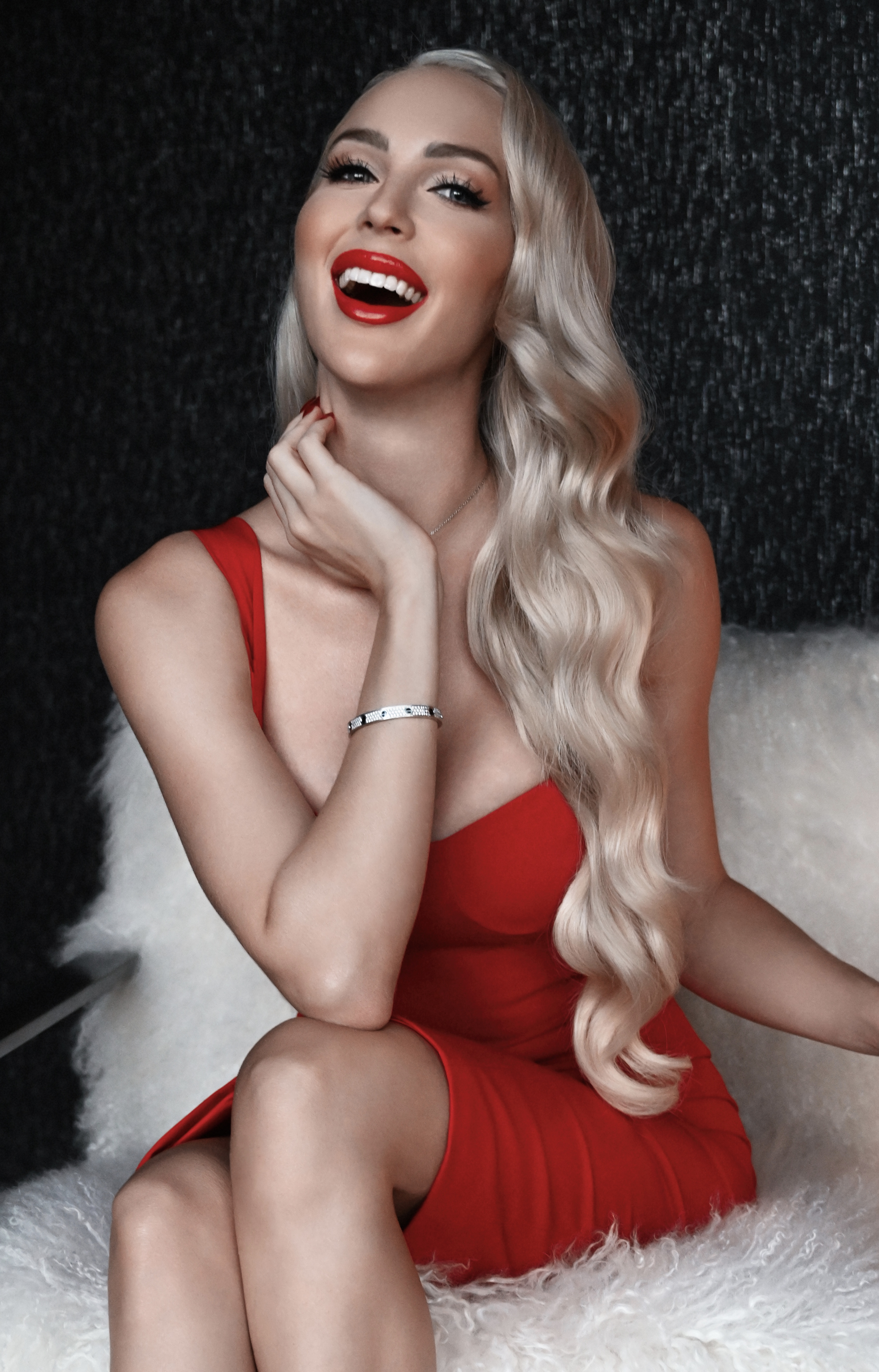
- Quinn in 2019
- Born: October 14, 1988 (age 37); Dallas, Texas, U.S.
- Occupations: Real estate agent, author, television personality
- Known for: Selling Sunset
- Spouse: Christian Dumontet (m. 2019; div. 2024)
- Children: 1

Christine Quinn (born October 14, 1988) is an American real estate agent, television personality, and author. She appeared on the Netflix reality series Selling Sunset from 2019 to 2022.

== Career ==
=== Real estate ===
Quinn began working in real estate in Los Angeles and joined The Oppenheim Group, a brokerage featured on Selling Sunset. She focused on residential properties in the high-end market and participated in client events as part of her work. During her time at the brokerage, she became part of the cast of Selling Sunset, which documented both her professional activities and interactions with colleagues.

=== Television ===
In 2019, Quinn joined the cast of Selling Sunset, a Netflix reality series that follows the professional and personal activities of agents at The Oppenheim Group. She appeared on the show for five seasons. During this time, the series documented her work in real estate, including client interactions and property sales, as well as her relationships and interactions with other cast members. The show covered personal milestones in her life, including her marriage and the birth of her son, presenting them alongside her professional activities at the brokerage.

In 2022, Quinn departed Selling Sunset after its fifth season. Her exit reportedly marked a turning point for the series and for her career. She later discussed feeling misrepresented by editing and narrative choices on the show and described her decision to pursue new ventures outside the Oppenheim Group.

In 2023, Quinn competed in season nine of The Masked Singer as "Scorpio". She was eliminated on "'80s Night" alongside George Wendt as "Moose".

In May 2025, Quinn was announced as a contestant for the third season of House of Villains, which premiered on Peacock in February 2026.

in 2026, it was announced that Quinn would be returning to Selling Sunset for its 10th season.

=== Business ===
After leaving Selling Sunset, Quinn co‑founded RealOpen, a real estate platform reportedly designed to facilitate property transactions using cryptocurrency. The company was launched in April 2022 with her then-husband, Christian Dumontet.

=== Writing ===
In 2022, Quinn published How to Be a Boss B*tch: Stop Apologizing for Who You Are and Get the Life You Want, written with Rachel Holtzman.

=== Fashion and modeling ===
Quinn has worked in fashion and beauty partnerships and has discussed a contract with IMG Models in interviews.

== Personal life ==
In December 2019, Quinn married Christian Dumontet, a tech entrepreneur. The couple had a son in 2021 and co‑founded RealOpen together. However, their marriage reportedly deteriorated later, and in 2024, Dumontet was arrested following a domestic incident involving Quinn and their son. The legal aftermath included divorce proceedings and public statements from Quinn regarding emotional and financial difficulties during the relationship. She subsequently relocated back to Texas with her son.

== Bibliography ==
- How to Be a Boss B*tch: Stop Apologizing for Who You Are and Get the Life You Want (with Rachel Holtzman, 2022).

== Filmography ==
Television
Year	Title	Role	Notes
2014	Drop Dead Diva	Ally Roth	Episode: "Cheers & Jeers"
2019–2022, 2026–	Selling Sunset	Herself	Main
2020	MTV Cribs	Herself	Episode with Kevin McHale
2023	The Masked Singer	Herself	Scorpio; Season 9 contestant
2024	Trixie Motel: Drag Me Home	Herself	"Oh Honey! I'm Home"
2026	House of Villains	Herself	Season 3
