= Music City (TV series) =

American reality television series on CMT

- Genre: Reality television
- Created by: Adam DiVello
- Starring: Alexandra Harper; Alisa Beth; Andreas "Dre" Plackis; Baylee Pirtle; Bryant Lowry; Jackson Boyd; Jessica Mack; Jeremiah Carter; Kerry Degman; Molly Mastin; Rachyl Degman; Sarah Thomas; Stephen Richards Jr.
- Opening theme: "Anything Is Possible" by MoZella
- Country of origin: United States
- Original language: English
- No. of seasons: 2
- No. of episodes: 18

Production
- Executive producers: Adam DiVello; Kristofer Lindquist; Andrew Perry; Alex Cross; Morgan Selzer
- Production location: Nashville, Tennessee
- Camera setup: Multiple
- Running time: 22–48 minutes
- Production companies: Done and Done Productions; Lionsgate Television

Original release
- Network: CMT
- Release: March 1, 2018 – January 31, 2019

Music City is an American reality television series on CMT. It premiered on March 1, 2018.

== Cast ==
=== Main ===
- Alexandra Harper
- Alisa Gillis (née Fuller)
- Bryant Lowry
- Jackson Boyd
- Jessica Mack
- Kerry Degman
- Rachyl Degman
- Sarah Thomas (Season 1)
- Jeremiah Carter
- Baylee Pirtle
- Molly Mastin
- Andreas "Dre" Plackis
- Stephen Richards Jr.

== Production ==
Season 1 premiered on March 1, 2018. On August 15, 2018, it was announced that Music City was renewed for a 10 episode second season that premiered on January 3, 2019.

== Episodes ==
Season	Episodes	Originally released	
Season	Episodes	First released	Last released
1	8	March 1, 2018	April 12, 2018
2	10	January 3, 2019	January 31, 2019

=== Season 1 (2018) ===
No. overall	No. in season	Title	Original release date	U.S. viewers (millions)
1	1	"For All the Dreamers"	March 1, 2018	0.20
Rachyl puts her dream of becoming a lawyer on hold to support her husband, Kerry, in chasing after his goal of becoming a country musician in Nashville, only to find out he's not being honest with her; Jackson discovers his love of singing.
2	2	"Confidence Is Everything"	March 1, 2018	0.20
When Kerry becomes unresponsive during his tour, the reality of his absence makes Rachyl question their future; Jackson is ready to get closer to Jessica, but a surprise revelation may stand in the way of them getting more serious. Meanwhile, Alisa discusses co-writing with Bryant.
3	3	"I'm Staying Here"	March 8, 2018	0.16
The road calls and Kerry considers taking a gig on a tour that conflicts with his wedding anniversary; when Rachyl informs Kerry about her serious consideration of law schools in other states, Kerry puts his foot down. Jessica invites Jackson and his cousin, Alexandra, to her and Alisa's birthday.
4	4	"And the New Miss Tennessee Is..."	March 15, 2018	0.16
Jackson tries to take things slow with Jessica, then he is faced with unexpected temptations driving him back to his old ways; when Rachyl receives a text message from an ex, her past threatens to derail her present; Alexandra competes in the Miss Tennessee pageant.
5	5	"Text From an Ex"	March 22, 2018	0.17
Jackson tries to decide if he's ready for a serious relationship with Jessica, while wondering if Savana is more to his liking; Rachyl struggles to tell Kerry about a recent text message exchange with an ex who just moved back to Nashville, Tenn. Alisa gets emotional during her writing session with Bryant.
6	6	"Look Before You Leap"	March 29, 2018	0.19
Jackson decides to perform live on stage, but might be biting off more than he can chew, especially now that Jessica is no longer in his corner; Kerry progresses his music career when he connects with blonde singer, Brooke. Rachyl signs Alisa up for an eligible singles shoot, which makes Bryant jealous.
7	7	"I Like You Better"	April 5, 2018	0.18
After Kerry comes home late after a night out with Brooke, Rachyl grapples with the state of their relationship; Jackson practises with Jessica for his upcoming birthday performance; Savana becomes suspicious of how much time they spend together, leading her to give Jackson an ultimatum: her or Jessica.
8	8	"Let's Go Home"	April 12, 2018	0.17
Rachyl must finally decide what is the right path for her and her dreams; after Savana's ultimatum, Jackson will need to decide if he is willing to give up music or Jessica. Meanwhile, Bryant makes his move with Alisa.

=== Season 2 (2019) ===
No. overall	No. in season	Title	Original release date	U.S. viewers (millions)
9	1	"New Chances, New Choices"	January 3, 2019	0.11
10	2	"Playing With Fire"	January 3, 2019	0.11
11	3	"Pity Party"	January 10, 2019	0.11
12	4	"Marriage, Morals, And A Makeover"	January 10, 2019	0.07
13	5	"Don't Go Chasing Waterfalls"	January 17, 2019	0.16
14	6	"When Life Hands You Lemons"	January 17, 2019	0.11
15	7	"Team Stripper"	January 24, 2019	0.16
16	8	"Between a Little Rock and a Hard Place"	January 24, 2019	0.16
17	9	"Til Death Do Us Part?"	January 31, 2019	N/A
18	10	"The Aftermath"	January 31, 2019	N/A

== Ratings ==
=== Season 1 (2018) ===
Viewership and ratings per episode of Music City
No.	Title	Air date	Rating (18–49)	Viewers (millions)
1	"For All the Dreamers"	March 1, 2018	0.1	0.20
2	"Confidence is Everything"	March 1, 2018	0.1	0.20
3	"I'm Staying Here"	March 8, 2018	0.1	0.16
4	"And the New Miss Tennessee Is..."	March 15, 2018	0.0	0.16
5	"Text From an Ex"	March 22, 2018	0.1	0.17
6	"Look Before You Leap"	March 29, 2018	0.1	0.19
7	"I Like You Better"	April 5, 2018	0.1	0.18
8	"Let's Go Home"	April 12, 2018	0.1	0.17

=== Season 2 (2019) ===
Viewership and ratings per episode of Music City
No.	Title	Air date	Rating (18–49)	Viewers (millions)
1	"New Chances, New Choices"	January 3, 2019	0.0	0.20
2	"Playing With Fire"	January 3, 2019	0.0	0.11
3	"Pity Party"	January 10, 2019	0.0	0.11
4	"Marriage, Morals, and a Makeover"	January 10, 2019	0.0	0.07
5	"Don't Go Chasing Waterfalls"	January 17, 2019	0.1	0.16
6	"When Life Hands You Lemons"	January 17, 2019	0.1	0.11
7	"Team Stripper"	January 24, 2019	0.1	0.16
8	"Between a Little Rock and a Hard Place"	January 24, 2019	0.1	0.16
9	"Til Death Do us Part?"	January 31, 2019	0.0	N/A
10	"The Aftermath"	January 31, 2019	0.0	N/A
