= Selling Sunset =

American reality television series

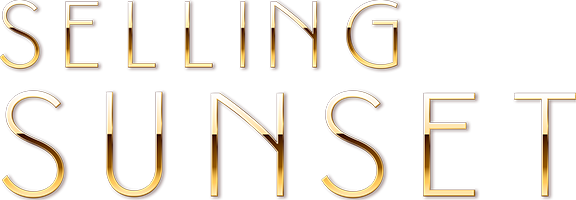
- Genre: Reality
- Created by: Adam DiVello
- Starring: Heather Rae El Moussa; Mary Bonnet; Brett Oppenheim; Jason Oppenheim; Christine Quinn; Chrishell Stause; Maya Vander; Romain Bonnet; Davina Potratz; Amanza Smith; Emma Hernan; Vanessa Villela; Chelsea Lazkani; Nicole Young; Bre Tiesi; Alanna Whittaker; Sandra Vergara; Tara Burns; Sasha Lance; Sonni Pacheco; Jordyn Taylor
- Country of origin: United States
- Original language: English
- No. of seasons: 9
- No. of episodes: 90

Production
- Camera setup: Multi-camera
- Running time: 23–47 minutes
- Production companies: Done and Done Productions; Lionsgate Television

Original release
- Network: Netflix
- Release: March 22, 2019 – present

Related
- Selling Tampa; Selling the OC; Selling the City

Selling Sunset is an American reality television series created for Netflix by Adam DiVello. The series revolves around the Oppenheim Group, a high-end real estate brokerage firm in the Los Angeles and San Diego areas (with offices in West Hollywood, Newport Beach, and the La Jolla neighborhood of San Diego), and follows a group of agents as they navigate their personal and professional lives.

The show premiered on March 22, 2019. It spawned a franchise with a direct spin-off titled Selling the OC, which focuses on the Newport Beach branch of the group, and two series focusing on others firms, Selling Tampa and Selling the City.

== Overview ==
=== Seasons 1–3 ===
The first season premiered with eight episodes on March 22, 2019; featuring Mary Fitzgerald, Brett Oppenheim, Jason Oppenheim, Christine Quinn, Chrishell Stause, Maya Vander and Heather Rae El Moussa (then Young) as the main realtors, alongside Romain Bonnet and Davina Potratz who served in recurring capacities.

The show returned for a second season on May 22, 2020; with the entire cast of the first season returning. Bonnet and Potratz were promoted to the main cast. Amanza Smith was added as the newest real estate agent and interior designer. The third season premiered on August 7, 2020 with the show's entire cast returning.

=== Season 4–7 ===
On March 11, 2021, Netflix renewed the show for a fourth and fifth season. In 2021, the series was nominated for the Primetime Emmy Award for Outstanding Unstructured Reality Program.

The show returned for its fourth season on November 24, 2021; introducing Emma Hernan and Vanessa Villela as the latest additions to the series, whilst Bonnet was demoted to a recurring capacity. Chelsea Lazkani was added to the cast ahead of the show's fifth season, which premiered on April 22, 2022.

On June 23, 2022, Netflix renewed the show for a sixth and seventh season. Just before production started on the sixth season it was reported that main cast member Christine Quinn would not be returning for the show's sixth and seven seasons. Filming for the sixth season started in August 2022 around Los Angeles.

The series' sixth season premiered on May 19, 2023 with new cast members Nicole Young and Bre Tiesi who replace Vander, Quinn and Villela. The series seventh season premiered on November 3, 2023.

=== Season 8–10 ===
The eighth season was released on September 6, 2024 with a new cast member, Alanna Whittaker. In December 2024, Lazkani confirmed that the show was renewed for a ninth season, and that filming was underway. The ninth season premiered on October 29, 2025, adding new cast member Sandra Vergara. On 2026, it was announced Quinn and El Moussa are returning alongside new cast members Jordyn Taylor, Sasha Lance, Sonni Pacheco, and Tara Burns. Season 10 is set to premiere on December 4, 2026.

== Cast ==
=== Timeline of cast members ===
| Cast member | Seasons | | | | | | | | | |
| Cast member | 1 | 2 | 3 | 4 | 5 | 6 | 7 | 8 | 9 | 10 |
|---|---|---|---|---|---|---|---|---|---|---|
| Brett Oppenheim | Main | Main | Main | Main | Main | Main | Main | Main | Main | Main |
| Jason Oppenheim | Main | Main | Main | Main | Main | Main | Main | Main | Main | Main |
| Mary Bonnet | Main | Main | Main | Main | Main | Main | Main | Main | Main | |
| Chrishell Stause | Main | Main | Main | Main | Main | Main | Main | Main | Main | |
| Heather Rae El Moussa | Main | Main | Main | Main | Main | Main | Recurring | | Guest | Main |
| Christine Quinn | Main | Main | Main | Main | Main | | | | | Main |
| Maya Vander | Main | Main | Main | Main | Main | Guest | | Guest | | |
| Davina Potratz | Recurring | Main | Main | Main | Main | Recurring | Guest | | | |
| Romain Bonnet | Recurring | Main | Main | Recurring | Recurring | Recurring | Main | Recurring | Guest | |
| Amanza Smith | | Main | Main | Main | Main | Main | Main | Main | Main | Main |
| Emma Hernan | | | | Main | Main | Main | Main | Main | Main | |
| Vanessa Villela | | | | Main | Main | | | | | |
| Chelsea Lazkani | | | | | Main | Main | Main | Main | Main | |
| Nicole Young | | | Guest | Guest | Guest | Main | Main | Main | Main | |
| Bre Tiesi | | | | | | Main | Main | Main | Main | Main |
| Alanna Gold | | | | | | | | Main | Main | |
| Sandra Vergara | | | | | | | | | Main | |
| Tara Burns | | | | | | | | | | Main |
| Sasha Lance | | | | | | | | | | Main |
| Sonni Pacheco | | | | | | | | | | Main |
| Jordyn Taylor | | | | | | | | | | Main |

- Brett and Jason Oppenheim, co-founders of the Oppenheim Group, identical twin brothers
- Heather Rae El Moussa (née Young), real estate agent, former Playboy Playmate and actress, is married to television personality Tarek El Moussa
- Mary Bonnet (née Fitzgerald), real estate agent, previously dated Jason before season one, marries Romain in season two's finale
- Christine Quinn, real estate agent, Chrishell's rival, marries entrepreneur Christian Richard in season three's finale, they have since separated
- Chrishell Stause, actress, real estate agent and recent addition to the Oppenheim Group, previously dated actor Justin Hartley (2017-2021), following on to date Jason during seasons 4 and 5 (July 2021-December 2021), continuing on to marry Australian musician G-Flip (2022–2026)
- Maya Vander, real estate agent, commutes between Los Angeles and Miami
- Romain Bonnet, model, marries Mary in season two's finale
- Davina Potratz, real estate agent, previously appeared on Bravo's Million Dollar Listing, joins rival agency Douglas Elliman and returns in season four
- Amanza Smith, real estate agent, CEO of AmanZa LLC (an interior design company), joins the Oppenheim Group from season two
- Emma Hernan, real estate agent, former Sports Illustrated model, Christine's rival, joins the Oppenheim Group from season four
- Vanessa Villela, real estate agent, Mexican-American novela star, owner of swimwear brand Lascivious, joins the Oppenheim Group from season four
- Chelsea Lazkani, real estate agent, originally from London, joins the Oppenheim Group from season five, she separates from her husband in season eight and they are divorced by season nine
- Bre Tiesi, real estate agent, mother of a child to Nick Cannon, former wife of Johnny Manziel, joins the Oppenheim Group from season six
- Nicole Young, real estate agent, longest-running Oppenheim Group staff member who joins the cast in a main role from season six
- Alanna Gold, real estate agent, joins the Oppenheim Group from season eight
- Sandra Vergara, actress, real estate agent, joins the Oppenheim Group from season nine
- Tara Burns, real estate agent, joins the Oppenheim Group from season ten
- Sasha Lance, real estate agent, joins the Oppenheim Group from season ten
- Sonni Pacheco, real estate agent, joins the Oppenheim Group from season ten
- Jordyn Taylor, real estate agent, joins the Oppenheim Group from season ten

== Episodes ==
| Season | Episodes | | Originally released |
|---|---|---|---|
| 1 | 8 | | March 22, 2019 |
| 2 | 8 | | May 22, 2020 |
| 3 | 8 | | August 7, 2020 |
| 4 | 10 | | November 24, 2021 |
| 5 | 11 | 10 | April 22, 2022 |
| 5 | 11 | 1 | May 6, 2022 |
| 6 | 11 | | May 19, 2023 |
| 7 | 12 | 11 | November 3, 2023 |
| 7 | 12 | 1 | November 15, 2023 |
| 8 | 11 | | September 6, 2024 |
| 9 | 11 | 10 | October 29, 2025 |
| 9 | 11 | 1 | November 5, 2025 |

=== Season 1 (2019) ===
| No. overall | No. in season | Title | Original release date |
|---|---|---|---|
| 1 | 1 | "If Looks Could Sell" | March 22, 2019 |
New agent Chrishell joins The Oppenheim Group and realizes she must prove herself. The brokers square off to sell a spectacular Hollywood Hills home.
| 2 | 2 | "Can't Have Your Cake and Eat It Too" | March 22, 2019 |
The agents get real about juggling love and career. Mary is shaken at her anniversary dinner. Heather feels the distance from Nick — and Christine.
| 3 | 3 | "(Real) Diamonds Are a Girl's Best Friend" | March 22, 2019 |
Mary gets a big surprise as Christine finds herself in an unexpected fight — and date. Actor Taye Diggs tours a home. Heather copes with a crisis.
| 4 | 4 | "Loose Lips Sink Relationships" | March 22, 2019 |
Chrishell learns a few lessons about business and friendship while Heather takes flak for delays. Maya makes a discovery but needs to keep it secret.
| 5 | 5 | "The One That Got Away" | March 22, 2019 |
Heather and Christine face off over the firm's big deal as Mary tries to find common ground. Christine warns Chrishell: Secrets set off explosions.
| 6 | 6 | "Real Estate Hunger Games" | March 22, 2019 |
A client pits Chrishell and Christine against each other. Heather sells her hot property and eyes a buyer for the unique home in the Hollywood Hills.
| 7 | 7 | "It Takes Two to Make a Thing Go Right" | March 22, 2019 |
Relationships are everything as Chrishell struggles to find an ideal home for a demanding buyer. Christine and Heather try to work together on a deal.
| 8 | 8 | "The Gloves Come Off" | March 22, 2019 |
Chrishell encounters jealousy as Heather embarrasses Jason. Mary reveals her frustration, and simmering tensions come to a full boil at the big party.

=== Season 2 (2020) ===
| No. overall | No. in season | Title | Original release date |
|---|---|---|---|
| 9 | 1 | "Let the Real Estate Games Begin" | May 22, 2020 |
The agents catch up at the $44 million home and learn Christine's engaged. Heather reveals a romance. Chrishell works the Valley. Amanza arrives.
| 10 | 2 | "Billionaires Have Compounds" | May 22, 2020 |
Chrishell and Christine have it out. Mary finds a dream home, and Davina thinks big. News of Heather's latest love leads to a frank talk with Brett.
| 11 | 3 | "Sorry, Not Sorry" | May 22, 2020 |
Heather and Amanza connect before Romain drops a bombshell. Chrishell gets a key listing as Christine plans her engagement party and spills to Davina.
| 12 | 4 | "The Red Engagement Party" | May 22, 2020 |
A stressed Mary must secure a wedding venue stat. Chrishell and Christine consider the unthinkable. Tempers flare at a red-hot engagement party.
| 13 | 5 | "I’m No Soldier" | May 22, 2020 |
Chrishell tours Jason's celebrity-owned home for her star client, Larsa Pippen. Mary confronts Christine and battles the boss. Maya checks out Brett's project.
| 14 | 6 | "The Wait Will Be Worth the Wait" | May 22, 2020 |
Retail therapy gives Christine a chance to vent. Mary shops for her ideal wedding dress. Amanza tries to help Heather, but can she do anything right?
| 15 | 7 | "That’s Why They Call It Real Estress" | May 22, 2020 |
Amanza confides in Mary. Davina ponders an invitation. The agents dish the dirt in Los Feliz. After hours, the bachelorette bash seethes with drama.
| 16 | 8 | "Karma’s Gonna Get You" | May 22, 2020 |
The realtors get real and revisit the "overlap" flap. Tears at a broker's open lead to a blowout. On her big day, Mary juggles her work and wedding.

=== Season 3 (2020) ===
| No. overall | No. in season | Title | Original release date |
|---|---|---|---|
| 17 | 1 | "Back to Business" | August 7, 2020 |
Amanza breaks down the backstabbing. After touring a sexy new listing and getting a tarot reading, Christine lashes back at her birthday bash.
| 18 | 2 | "Confidence Is Key" | August 7, 2020 |
Business is booming, but Jason isn't happy with Amanza. Brokers turn out for Christine's burger and Botox blowout. Alone, Chrishell and Davina clash.
| 19 | 3 | "The Biggest Agent in the Room" | August 7, 2020 |
Tensions grow over a high-priced listing, and fissures appear in a friendship. Heather and Amanza warily team up. Mary makes a confession to Romain.
| 20 | 4 | "Everybody Loves Mary" | August 7, 2020 |
The agents dish about favoritism and weigh their options. Heather and Amanza get — and give — some bad news. Friendsgiving brings a huge announcement.
| 21 | 5 | "Bad News Travels Fast" | August 7, 2020 |
A "Versace house" is on the agenda. Christine falls for a wedding gown. Two agents try to talk it out. After Chrishell's event, shocking news breaks.
| 22 | 6 | "One Text Changes Everything" | August 7, 2020 |
Still raw, Chrishell confides in Mary. Christine, Maya and Davina meet for tea. Mary faces Romain. Amanza and Heather's teamwork makes for dream work.
| 23 | 7 | "Two Sides to Every Story" | August 7, 2020 |
It takes two. Chrishell regroups and reassesses in St. Louis as Christine gets set for her wedding. After all her hard work, Amanza clinches a deal.
| 24 | 8 | "A Not So White Wedding" | August 7, 2020 |
Chrishell returns. Heather bristles. After showing a Neutra to "Queer Eye" star Karamo, Christine walks down the aisle. Unanticipated drama awaits.

=== Season 4 (2021) ===
| No. overall | No. in season | Title | Original release date |
|---|---|---|---|
| 25 | 1 | "Very High Heels to Fill" | November 24, 2021 |
An expecting Christine and revived Chrishell eye sexy, luxe properties. A hot market means major growth as disarming new agent Vanessa join the team.
| 26 | 2 | "New Friends, Old Enemies" | November 24, 2021 |
Drama looms following a tour of French Montana's opulent digs when Vanessa bonds with Christine and then connects with Chrishell, Heather and Mary.
| 27 | 3 | "Rival Arrival" | November 24, 2021 |
Jason breaks the news: Emma will fill her rival's sky-high heels. Chrishell fights to buy her first home. Christine talks about a tough childbirth.
| 28 | 4 | "The Emma Dilemma" | November 24, 2021 |
Another dinner, another dramatic reveal: Emma tells her side of the story. Amid spectacular views, Vanessa tries to get to the truth with Christine.
| 29 | 5 | "Let Sleeping Dogs Lie" | November 24, 2021 |
Christine flexes for Davina, who reaches out to Jason. After a splashy sale goes south, a familiar face crashes Mary's canine birthday celebration.
| 30 | 6 | "A House for a Hero" | November 24, 2021 |
Newly minted superhero Simu Liu gets the star treatment as Chrishell's client. Christine and Emma try to clear the air. Davina negotiates a return.
| 31 | 7 | "Back on the Market" | November 24, 2021 |
Agents bring the heart — and movers, the heat — to the once-homeless Chrishell's housewarming. Amanza reveals her troubles, and a date grows awkward.
| 32 | 8 | "The Truth Hurts" | November 24, 2021 |
Chrishell takes Simu on a hero's journey through a gamer's retreat. Heather makes a tearful decision. Christine surprises Maya as Amanza gets a shock.
| 33 | 9 | "The Beginning of the End" | November 24, 2021 |
Open house, open book: Davina faces Christine, who meets Vanessa's mindset coach. Chrishell works with player Thomas Bryant. Mary and Romain clash.
| 34 | 10 | "One Last Hail Mary" | November 24, 2021 |
Anticipation builds for Jason's lavish bash. Chrishell finds an ideal house for Thomas. Big news drops, but will Christine drop her defenses for Mary?

=== Season 5 (2022) ===
| No. overall | No. in season | Title | Original release date |
|---|---|---|---|
| 35 | 1 | "Game Changer" | April 22, 2022 |
Flying high: Chrishell reveals her latest love--Jason. In LA, the agents get real about the relationship while Christine readies her return.
| 36 | 2 | "New Blood" | April 22, 2022 |
At the office, Chrishell faces J-Shell questions. Chelsea connects with Jason. Christine dishes with Amanza. Emma shocks, and Mary get big news.
| 37 | 3 | "Coming for All Your Coin" | April 22, 2022 |
Black and blond Barbies brainstorm. Emma meets a hot developer with a sexy home. Chrishell tries out a dog door. Heather's shower ends with a surprise.
| 38 | 4 | "Bad Bitches Don't Cry" | April 22, 2022 |
Heather has it out, but can Christine keep it professional? At the caviar and couture party, Chelsea dresses to impress and defends her friend.
| 39 | 5 | "Do You Think We're Friends?" | April 22, 2022 |
Emma shares a new love with Chrishell. Christine breaks down her event, Amanza reveals an empowering space, and Davina clashes with a client.
| 40 | 6 | "Step Up or Step Out" | April 22, 2022 |
Hot market, high expectations: Mary ups the pressure and makes a confession to Romain. Chrishell spars with Brett. Davina looks for a last chance.
| 41 | 7 | "It's Getting Personal" | April 22, 2022 |
Real talk: Chelsea hears from Heather while Davina confronts Christine about her catty quips. Jason's mom grills Chrishell and her son over bites.
| 42 | 8 | "She's Your Problem Too" | April 22, 2022 |
Musical desks: Chelsea enters blazing, bearing business and invites. Mary makes her move. Chrishell confides in Jason. A tea party gets heated.
| 43 | 9 | "Sabotage in Stilettos" | April 22, 2022 |
Miami-bound Maya goes out with a bang. Spilt tea leaves Davina unsettled. Chrishell opens up to Heather. A backstabbing rumor shakes Mary.
| 44 | 10 | "Nothing Remains the Same" | April 22, 2022 |
Hearts flip as Heather weds Tarek. Jason and Mary grapple with being ghosted. Go solo or take the next step: The agents face life-changing decisions.
| 45 | 11 | "The Reunion" | May 6, 2022 |
Fractured friendships. Telling texts. Raw emotions. Hot gossip. The cast sit down with host Tan France to talk about the season and their lives today.

=== Season 6 (2023) ===
| No. overall | No. in season | Title | Original release date |
|---|---|---|---|
| 46 | 1 | "I Wanted to Hate You" | May 19, 2023 |
Chrishell is head-over-heels in love - but is she ready to face the awkwardness at the office? New agent Bre comes in hot, ruffling a few feathers.
| 47 | 2 | "TBD on Bre" | May 19, 2023 |
While old resentments threaten to create new drama between Chrishell and veteran Oppenheim agent Nicole, Chelsea raises some doubts about Bre.
| 48 | 3 | "Old Deals Die Hard" | May 19, 2023 |
A smitten Jason introduces the team to his girlfriend, Marie-Lou, and asks Mary for a favor. The claws come out at a Manhattan Beach open house.
| 49 | 4 | "Between You and Bre" | May 19, 2023 |
After a girls' night out for Heather's birthday, Chelsea shares her unfiltered opinions about Bre's relationship. Mary urges Nicole to make peace.
| 50 | 5 | "Miss Management" | May 19, 2023 |
Bre shows houses to a celebrity client looking for a fabulous family home, while renovation delays and office squabbling amp up Mary's anxiety levels.
| 51 | 6 | "Mary In The Middle" | May 19, 2023 |
Jason has a rocky reentry from Europe, prompting Emma to complain to Chrishell. Mary attempts to facilitate peace talks.
| 52 | 7 | "If You Can't Stand The Heat..." | May 19, 2023 |
Chrishell and Jason catch up before the agents head to Palm Springs for what they hope is a healing retreat - but leaving the drama in LA won't be easy.
| 53 | 8 | "Bre Bites Back" | May 19, 2023 |
While Elvis superfan Chrishell enjoys a tour of his honeymoon home, Nicole makes a statement. Later, Bre airs out her grievances with Chelsea.
| 54 | 9 | "Lawsuits and Listings" | May 19, 2023 |
On the agents' last day in Palm Springs, a pool party ceasefire doesn't even last until the end of dinner. Bre tours a listing with rapper Saweetie.
| 55 | 10 | "Something's Gotta Give" | May 19, 2023 |
Back in LA, Bre opens up to Heather and Amanza shares emotional news with Mary. Heather's baby shower becomes yet another battleground.
| 56 | 11 | "It's Not Worth It" | May 19, 2023 |
Chelsea shows Emma a new side of herself. At Jason's penthouse launch event, a candid conversation with Mary helps Chrishell come to realization.

=== Season 7 (2023) ===
| No. overall | No. in season | Title | Original release date |
|---|---|---|---|
| 57 | 1 | "The Real Estate Apocalypse" | November 3, 2023 |
Chrishell and Jason return from New Year's Down Under to a chilly LA real estate market. Chelsea goes big for her thirtieth birthday with a glam masquerade.
| 58 | 2 | "Mean Girl Sh*t" | November 3, 2023 |
After conflict with the other agents pushes Nicole to a breaking point, Amanza tries to broker a ceasefire. Jason raises a concern with Chrishell.
| 59 | 3 | "House of Horrors" | November 3, 2023 |
Chrishell counsels comedian Nikki Glaser and meets Marie-Lou for an awkward lunch. An anniversary dinner at an LA architectural landmark turns tense.
| 60 | 4 | "Namaste Out of Everyone's Business" | November 3, 2023 |
Chelsea attempts to wipe the slate clean with Bre, but Amanza can't escape the mess. Not everyone is on board with Jason's big plans for a new office.
| 61 | 5 | "Setting The Stage for Disaster" | November 3, 2023 |
New listing assignments cause friction when Brett ruffles Bre's feathers. Jason asks Nicole to prep a house for Chrishell to sell.
| 62 | 6 | "It's Not the Size of the Listing..." | November 3, 2023 |
While Chelsea gets to work on her new $10 million listing, Amanza hatches a plan to decorate G Flip's studio. Mary gives Nicole some advice.
| 63 | 7 | "Cabo San Loco" | November 3, 2023 |
The agents fly south to check out The O Group's new location in Cabo, with all their drama along for the ride. Mary and Romain process a painful loss.
| 64 | 8 | "Oppenheim Wine" | November 3, 2023 |
An encounter at a Cabo open house puts Bre on edge. Mary joins the party. Amanza loses her patience with Chrishell's vanishing act.
| 65 | 9 | "The Enemy of My Enemy" | November 3, 2023 |
Back in LA, the fallout from Cabo continues. Chelsea and Nicole find common ground with a new friend. Mary and Chrishell reconnect.
| 66 | 10 | "Pack it up, pack it in" | November 3, 2023 |
Chelsea recommends a potential new agent, raising Bre's eyebrows. While the crew packs up to move offices, Amanza prioritizes self-care.
| 67 | 11 | "Commission Impossible" | November 3, 2023 |
Bre makes a case for her worth to Jason ahead of a blowout bash for the shiny new Oppenheim office, where old friends and new rivals come face-to-face.
| 68 | 12 | "The Reunion" | November 15, 2023 |
Alongside host Tan France, the O group agents reunite to discuss this season's drama, disputes and difficult truths.

=== Season 8 (2024) ===
| No. overall | No. in season | Title | Original release date |
|---|---|---|---|
| 69 | 1 | "The Girls are Back in Town" | September 6, 2024 |
Chelsea calls out Mary for labeling her the biggest instigator in the office. New agent Alanna chases a $30 million listing. Bre puts Jason on the spot.
| 70 | 2 | "Who Wears the Pants?" | September 6, 2024 |
Chrishell tries to persuade Bre to return to The O Group. Mary criticizes Chelsea's professionalism at an open house. Brett and Jason evaluate Alanna.
| 71 | 3 | "Cat’s Out of the Birkin Bag" | September 6, 2024 |
Amanza throws herself a birthday bash where the drinks and the drama flow freely. Bre's friend Amanda spills a shocking secret about an Oppenheim agent.
| 72 | 4 | "Sitting on a Secret" | September 6, 2024 |
Chelsea and Mary meet to address their issues head-on as Bre debates whether to share bad news. A tense confrontation at the office rattles Nicole.
| 73 | 5 | "Once Alanna Time in the West" | September 6, 2024 |
Bre reveals explosive news to Chelsea that affects the group trip to Alanna's Western-themed desert oasis. Nicole brings up a touchy topic at dinner
| 74 | 6 | "Don’t Rain on My Parade" | September 6, 2024 |
Nicole, Alanna and Amanza tour the iconic Invisible House. Bre helps her ex, Johnny Manziel, find a place. A rainy open house draws an unexpected agent.
| 75 | 7 | "Sides are Chosen" | September 6, 2024 |
Chelsea questions Bre's motives for airing her personal news on camera. Alanna's listing turns problematic. Emma pitches an intriguing idea to Chrishell.
| 76 | 8 | "Down on Your Potluck" | September 6, 2024 |
The team gathers at a memorial potluck for an old friend, where Bre's presence creates tension. Chrishell's attempt at peacekeeping frustrates Chelsea.
| 77 | 9 | "Two Listings and a Funeral" | September 6, 2024 |
TikTok celebs tap The O Group to list their home, and Jason shops to ease his sorrow. The clash between Bre and Chelsea intensifies in the wrong place.
| 78 | 10 | "World War Bre" | September 6, 2024 |
Chrishell finds herself in a tricky spot with a client's property. Amanza's packed art show impresses the crew. Bre shares some regrets with Amanda.
| 79 | 11 | "Burning Down the House" | September 6, 2024 |
Jason stuns the team with a risky investment. Amanza ponders her future while Bre hatches a plot to shake up the office. Chelsea eyes a new home.

=== Season 9 (2025) ===
| No. overall | No. in season | Title | Original release date |
|---|---|---|---|
| 80 | 1 | "Gossip Girls" | October 29, 2025 |
Despite Jason's push for unity, the office is more divided than ever. Bre negotiates a $16M deal. Nicole's attempt at an apology falls flat for Emma.
| 81 | 2 | "Girlsgiving" | October 29, 2025 |
Chrishell lands a bedazzled listing from singer JoJo Siwa. Amanza preaches peace at her Girlsgiving feast, but a lowblow remark takes things too far.
| 82 | 3 | "Too Far Gone" | October 29, 2025 |
Tensions simmer in the fallout of Girlsgiving. A slight at Emma's empanada launch revives an old feud. Jason and Brett make a difficult decision.
| 83 | 4 | "One Less Agent, One New Boyfriend" | October 29, 2025 |
Changes to the team stun the agency. Bre shows NFL linebacker LaVar Arrington a home with winning views. Emma's love life raises eyebrows.
| 84 | 5 | "Strong Together" | October 29, 2025 |
In the aftermath of the Los Angeles wildfires, the O group offices rally to support the victims. A targeted robbery leaves Mary traumatized.
| 85 | 6 | "Taking Out the Trash" | October 29, 2025 |
Can a fresh face fix the vibe at the office? As Mary leans on Bre during her hour of need, a supportive gesture from another agent backfires.
| 86 | 7 | "A Diamond in the Rough" | October 29, 2025 |
As Emma eyes diamonds with Chelsea, Mary contemplates a major life change. Chrishell and pop star Tinashe find the perfect home studio
| 87 | 8 | "Scary Mary" | October 29, 2025 |
At Jason's brokers open, Emma shares a shocking life update. A team dinner for Mary turns hostile, deepening divisions within the agency.
| 88 | 9 | "There's No Going Back" | October 29, 2025 |
As power dynamics shift, the agents get an over-the-top invite. Chrishell ponders family plans and tours a home with star hairstylist Chris Appleton.
| 89 | 10 | "Time to Clean House" | October 29, 2025 |
Who's real and who's fake? Bonds and boundaries are tested as Bre throws a lavish Galentine's day party. Chrishell, Emma and Chelsea look to the future.
| 90 | 11 | "The Reunion" | November 5, 2025 |
In this tell-all reunion hosted by Tan France, the agents gather alongside special guests to round off about the season's juiciest drama.

== Reunion controversies ==
Season 5 (2022)
| Topic | Cast | Explanation | Episode Occurrence |
|---|---|---|---|
| Controversial Flower Arrangement | Heather and Christine | The cast state that the flowers were over the top and Christine wanted everyone to be aware that her presence is everywhere after she wasn't invited to Heather's wedding. | 3 |
| Friendships With Everyone | Davina, Christine and Chelsea | Christine tells Chelsea that she believes Davina finds it really important to be liked by everyone which causes conflict as Christine argues Davina mention this however Davina claims she never said anything. | 8 |
| Bribing | Emma and Christine | Conversations surrounding the speculation of Christine bribing Emma's client to prevent them from working with Emma. | 9 |
| 'Jishell' | Chrishell and Jason | Discussion around their breakup and why they ended as a result of Jason not wanting to children in the current time Chrishell wanted to start a family. | 10 |

Season 7 (2023)
| Topic | Cast | Explanation | Episode Occurrence |
|---|---|---|---|
| 'Rearranged Your Face' | Chrishell and Nicole | Chrishell believed Nicole had created a plan prior to re-joining the show to depict Chrishell as a bad person leading her to say these comments. | 1 |
| 'Topic On Camera' | Chrishell and Marie-Lou | Marie-Lou claims Chrishell is lying when discussing their previous conversation whilst also dismissing the nice comments Chrishell has said. | 2 + 3 |
| Business Deal | Amanza, Chrishell and G-Flip | Both Amanza and Chrishell discuss their personal reasons to why conflict between the two started but end with them both settling the disagreement. | 9 |
| Bre's Future | Bre, Cassandra and Chelsea | Bre questions whether she will remain in the office after continuous conflicted situations, in particular Chelsea inviting Cassandra to the opening of the new office. | 11 |

Season 9 (2025)
| Topic | Cast | Explanation | Episode Occurrence |
|---|---|---|---|
| Nicole's Exit | Jason, Brett and Nicole | Conversation referring to the difficult situation that Jason and Brett had to do when asking Nicole to take a step back from the Oppenheim Group. | 3 |
| Contradicting Flower Delivery | Chelsea and Mary | Mary claims the flower delivery was planned and purposely arrived during filming to make Chelsea look like a good person. | 6 |
| Car Keying Accusations | Sandra and Chrishell | Conflict between Sandra and Chrishell as her assistant claims Sandra has keyed her car after living in the same block of apartment's. | 10 |
| 'Girls Giving' | Nicole and Amanza | Nicole refuses to take accountability for the numerous conversations, surrounding illegal substances and comments referring the Chrishell's parents who have both passed. | 10 |

== Production ==
Series creator Adam DiVello got the idea for the show when he saw an advertisement for the Oppenheim Group in a magazine. "I ripped it out and gave it to my development executive… and I said, 'Call these people. Get me an interview with them'", Divello told Vanity Fair in 2020. "It was pretty remarkable that it's like an all-female ensemble cast, and these two twin brothers were running it. To me, it seemed like a no-brainer."

== Franchise ==
Selling Sunset became a franchise with the premiere of a second series, titled Selling Tampa, on December 15, 2021. This series follows the Allure Realty firm in Florida. It was cancelled after one season. A third series, Selling the OC, premiered on August 24, 2022. It is a direct spin-off to Selling Sunset, focusing on another branch of the Oppenheim Group in Newport Beach. Many members of the original series makes appearances in the spin-off while some members of OC also appear in Sunset.

On January 3, 2025, a fourth series, Selling the City, premiered on Netflix. It follows the Douglas Elliman firm agents in New York City.

== Controversies ==
Celebrities such as Chrissy Teigen have questioned the authenticity of the show. A long-term real estate agent in LA told the Mail that "The Oppenheim brothers are the real deal but none of us have ever come across the women they have working for them. It's clear these 'girls', as they call them on the show, were hired to make the show sizzle." Star Chrishell Stause has fought back against the accusations, going so far as to post a picture of her real estate license online to dismiss the rumors.
