= Jason Oppenheim =

American real estate broker and television personality (born 1977)

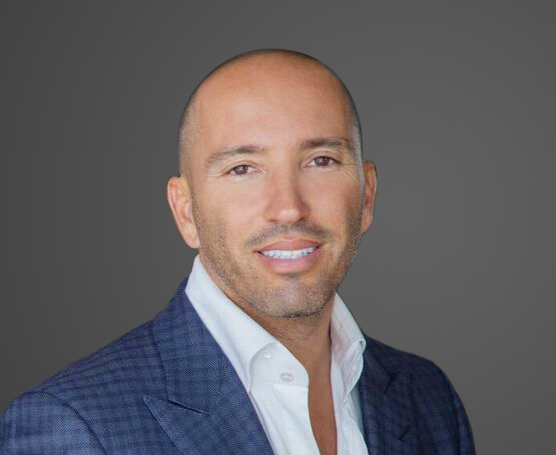
- Oppenheim in 2017
- Born: April 12, 1977 (age 49)
- Education: University of California, Berkeley
- Occupations: Real estate broker; television personality

Jason Oppenheim (born April 12, 1977) is an American real estate broker and television personality. He is the president of the Oppenheim Group, a real estate brokerage based in West Hollywood, Los Angeles, and appears on the Netflix reality television series Selling Sunset and its spin-off Selling the OC.

== Early life and education ==
Oppenheim and his twin brother, Brett, grew up in Northern California and attended the University of California, Berkeley.

== Career ==
Before transitioning to real estate, Oppenheim worked from 2003 to 2007 as a litigation associate at the Los Angeles office of O'Melveny & Myers, where he was part of the legal defense team led by partner Daniel Petrocelli that represented former Enron CEO Jeffrey Skilling during the 2006 Enron criminal trial.

According to Time, the Oppenheim Group was relaunched in 2013, and its Sunset Boulevard office opened in 2014.

Oppenheim has appeared on other real estate television programs, including Million Dollar Listing and Beautiful Homes & Great Estates.

== Television ==
Selling Sunset, created by Adam DiVello, follows agents at the Oppenheim Group.

Selling the OC, a spin-off series centered on the Oppenheim Group's Orange County office, debuted on August 24, 2022.
