= Home Movies season 1 =

Home Movies
- Season 1
- DVD cover
- No. of episodes: 13

Release
- Original network: UPN; Adult Swim (episodes 6–13)
- Original release: April 26, 1999 – October 7, 2001

Season chronology
- Next → Season 2

The first season of the animated sitcom Home Movies originally began airing in the United States on the television network UPN from April 26 to May 24, 1999, and on Cartoon Network from September 2 to October 7, 2001. The pilot episode was titled, "Get Away From My Mom." Co-creators Brendon Small and Loren Bouchard, along with Tom Snyder, served as writers, executive producers, and directors for the season. The season utilized Snyder's signature "squigglevision" animation style, though it would change to a more "conventional" flash-animated style for the subsequent three seasons.

The series follows the adventures of 8-year-old Brendon Small, who writes, directs, and stars in homemade film productions that he creates with his friends Melissa Robbins and Jason Penopolis. Brendon and Melissa's soccer coach, John McGuirk, is a short-tempered and selfish alcoholic who constantly gives Brendon and Melissa bad or morally bankrupt advice. Brendon's mother, Paula, meanwhile, is divorced and juggling her children, her job as a creative writing teacher, and her romantic life.

The main cast for the season consisted of Small, H. Jon Benjamin, Paula Poundstone, and Melissa Bardin Galsky. Poundstone's role was recast after six episodes and given to Janine Ditullio as a replacement. The first five episodes of the season demonstrated a writing style known as "retroscripting," consisting of the cast completely improvising the storyline and animation being produced afterwards.

UPN decided to schedule the season in the timeslot following Dilbert on Monday nights, in the hopes of giving Home Movies good Nielsen ratings. Despite this, the pilot episode received all-time low ratings and the network called the crew in order to inform them that it was the lowest-rated program they had ever broadcast in the timeslot in its televised history. The ratings continued to be incredibly low and UPN canceled the series after only five episodes. Despite this, Khaki Jones, Cartoon Network's Vice President of Original Series, was a "huge fan" of the series and was able to get it picked up on the channel's Adult Swim block, reopening production on the season. These episodes include Jonathan Katz, Ron Lynch, Sam Brown, Paula Plum, Richard Snee, Mitch Hedberg, Eugene Mirman, Laura Silverman, Larry Murphy, Will LeBow, Bill Braudis, Jen Kirkman, Kelly Kimball and Amy Roeder, as guest stars.

The complete season DVD was released by Shout! Factory on November 16, 2004, and featured all thirteen episodes and an assortment of bonus features.

== Episodes ==
No. overall	No. in season	Title	Directed by	Written by	Original release date	Prod. code	Viewers (millions)
UPN
1	1	"Get Away From My Mom"	Loren Bouchard	Brendon Small, Loren Bouchard, H. Jon Benjamin, Paula Poundstone & Melissa Bardin Galsky	April 26, 1999	101	1.76
While filming a new movie entitled The Dark Side of the Law, Brendon discovers that his mother Paula is going to go out on a date with his soccer coach, John McGuirk. The date ends up going terribly and Paula gets drunk in order to withstand it. The next day at soccer practice, Brendon acts up and warns everyone that McGuirk will try to make moves on their mothers. Later, Brendon apologizes to McGuirk and they reconcile. Soon after, McGuirk and Paula break up over the phone.
2	2	"I Don't Do Well in Parent-Teacher Conferences"	Loren Bouchard	Brendon Small, Loren Bouchard, H. Jon Benjamin, Paula Poundstone & Melissa Bardin Galsky	May 3, 1999	102	1.45
Paula is forced to attend a parent-teacher conference after learning that Brendon has not done any of his homework from the entire year, despite the fact that she hates doing so. Brendon's teacher informs her that Brendon is now in danger of repeating the fourth grade because he did not perform any research for a project. She attempts to vouch for her son, but her communication skills are terrible and she discovers she has no other option but to encourage him to display a better work ethic. She fails in doing so and Brendon simply becomes overstressed. As a way of expressing his fears of doing the presentation, he creates a new film about a man who becomes a monster when forced into public-speaking.
3	3	"The Art of the Sucker Punch"	Loren Bouchard	Brendon Small, Loren Bouchard, H. Jon Benjamin, Paula Poundstone & Melissa Bardin Galsky	May 10, 1999	103	1.83
After learning that the local bully, Shannon, has been harassing and beating up Jason, Brendon decides to challenge Shannon to a brawl, despite the fact that he does not know how to fight. He trains himself to the best of his ability and documents his training all on camera. After training for a few days, the fight commences and Brendon is knocked down in three punches. Despite this, Brendon, Jason, and Melissa are invited to Shannon's birthday party, where they sympathize with the bully after he tells them a lie that no one showed up. He then humiliates them, revealing that all the guests are simply hiding and laughing at them, and Brendon retaliates by stealing his lawn gnome.
4	4	"Brendon Gets Rabies"	Loren Bouchard	Brendon Small, Loren Bouchard, H. Jon Benjamin, Paula Poundstone & Melissa Bardin Galsky	May 17, 1999	104	1.84
Paula promises her neighbors, the Peabodys, that she will take care of their pet cat, Alexandre, while they are off on vacation. She soon realizes that the cat is prissy, spoiled, and uncooperative, so she hands off the responsibility to Brendon, who accepts hoping to show his mother that he is mature enough to own a dog. However, Brendon accidentally lets Alexandre out, and he enlists Jason and Melissa to help him find the cat. Brendon finds the cat, but Alexandre has contracted rabies and bites Brendon. Wracked with guilt that he was to blame for the cat's death, as Alexandre to be put down, Brendon makes a movie for the Peabodys to memorialize the cat, only for Paula to back into the Peabodys' car while leaving the pet cemetery.
5	5	"Yoko" "We'll Always Have Tuesday"	Loren Bouchard	Brendon Small, Loren Bouchard, H. Jon Benjamin, Paula Poundstone & Melissa Bardin Galsky	May 24, 1999	105	1.72
The soccer team goes on a camping trip with McGuirk as their chaperone. When they return, Brendon begins a relationship with a girl named Loni, whom he discovered he had feelings for on the trip. She begins acting in Brendon's films, but upsets both Jason and Melissa with her ineptitude. Loni tells Brendon that she still has feelings for Mitch and breaks up with Brendon to go back with him.
Adult Swim
6	6	"Director's Cut"	Loren Bouchard	Brendon Small, Bill Braudis & Loren Bouchard	September 2, 2001	106	N/A
Dwayne, who performs the music for the kids' movies, has written a script for a rock opera film adaption of Franz Kafka's The Metamorphosis. Melissa presses Brendon to make the film, but he is reluctant as he is filming a movie called Louis, Louis, a fictional encounter between Louis Braille and Louis Pasteur. He eventually gives in and begins filming the movie. Melissa and Jason love the film but Brendon despises it and wishes to rewrite the script. No one responds to his wish, including Dwayne, and he ends up abandoning the project, forcing Brendon to cancel production. He films Louis, Louis by himself, but eventually returns to help film the opera, agreeing to create a director's cut to include both his and Dwayne's ideas. Meanwhile, McGuirk becomes outshined on the soccer team by a new assistant coach named Drew. He attempts to get Drew fired by spray painting a wall at school and pitting the blame on Drew, but the police catch McGuirk instead, redhanded. Note: The debut airing of this episode was the very first program to ever air on Adult Swim.
7	7	"It Was Supposed to Be Funny"	Loren Bouchard	Brendon Small, Bill Braudis & Loren Bouchard	September 9, 2001	107	N/A
Melissa's father Erik approaches Brendon, asking him to make a film about his father Ned's life for his birthday. Brendon agrees and interviews Ned with Jason in his retirement home, but he finds his regale boring and does the interview again with Ned in drag. When he shows the film at Ned's birthday party, Melissa is furious at the treatment of her grandfather. Brendon attempts to apologize to Melissa, but she refuses it, putting a tamper on their friendship.
8	8	"Method of Acting"	Loren Bouchard	Brendon Small, Bill Braudis & Loren Bouchard	September 16, 2001	108	N/A
Brendon takes acting lessons in the hopes of strengthening his acting ability. He continuously interrupts everyone else in the class and displays no acting prowess, eventually leading to him being kicked out without a refund. He attempts to get a role in a commercial, but the interview falls flat when his audition tape turns out to be a recording of him singing in drag. Meanwhile, Paula is stressed out after making out with a student in her creative writing class, who reveals that the kiss meant nothing. McGuirk enlists the entire soccer team to help him win a hovercraft, but they end up revolting against him, resulting in him losing the contest.
9	9	"Life Through a Fish Eye Lens"	Loren Bouchard	Brendon Small, Bill Braudis & Loren Bouchard	September 23, 2001	109	N/A
Brendon is filming a new movie about aliens and believes that the film cannot work without a fish-eye lens. The lens is expensive and Paula is experiencing heavy financial issues, so she is unable to buy it for him. While she is practicing asking her mother for a loan, Brendon performs a card trick on her and she ends up owing him $20. Unsuccessful in getting money still, Brendon gets a job as a paperboy, but quits after being attacked by a dog. He gets hired by Erik to do miscellaneous jobs at his real-estate, but he ends up shredding all the documents in his office by accident and is fired. He begins cleaning up around an ice cream stand, trying to impress the worker and get a job, but it fails. Paula ends up getting a loan from her mother and Brendon is anxious to buy the lens, but finds out it does not fit on his camera. Meanwhile, McGuirk tells the soccer team that they will be facing his old coach Ralph's team in an upcoming game and the only way to win is through cheating. When the game comes, Ralph does not show up and McGuirk explains that he made him up to motivate the team. Melissa reveals that she made a bet with Brendon that Ralph was real and now owes him $20.
10	10	"School Nurse"	Loren Bouchard	Brendon Small, Bill Braudis & Loren Bouchard	September 30, 2001	110	N/A
When a lice outbreak happens at the school, Nurse Kirkman is introduced as the new school nurse, checking children for lice, with Jason apparently being patient zero and Melissa also infested. McGuirk goes on a date with Nurse Kirkman, but he becomes drunk and she is disgusted by him. Kirkman drives him to his house, but McGuirk passes out and she is forced to push him out of the car. The next day at the teacher's lounge, Kirkman tells Brendon and Melissa's teacher Mr. Lynch that the date went terribly and she and McGuirk are not dating. McGuirk learns of this and confronts her, telling her that she thought they had something special. Jason, who has developed strong feelings for Nurse Kirkman, attacks McGuirk after hearing that they went on a date. Later, at a soccer rally, McGuirk gives a speech but interrupts it to tell Kirkman he would go back out with her if she begged him. She does not do so and tells Jason that she will start dating him when he turns 30.
11	11	"Mortgages and Marbles"	Loren Bouchard	Brendon Small, Bill Braudis & Loren Bouchard	September 30, 2001	111	N/A
Brendon's adoptive sister Josie is rushed to the hospital after sticking a marble up her nose, where she is deemed healthy and is signed out. Brendon then decides to make a public service announcement, filming Jason and Melissa performing with hand puppets to warn children not to stick marbles up their noses. Dwayne and his band then begin performing a rock song about the same thing. When they show the video to a group of toddlers at school, the message is misinterpreted and all the children begin shoving marbles up their noses. Meanwhile, Erik promises to help McGuirk find a new house after he hastily moves out of his apartment without a plan, temporarily living with Erik and Melissa, much to her disgust. McGuirk ultimately has to move back into his original place for three times his previous rent, but Erik helps him with rental laws.
12	12	"Law and Boarder"	Loren Bouchard	Brendon Small, Bill Braudis & Loren Bouchard	October 7, 2001	112	N/A
While riding his bicycle in the rain, Brendon is struck by a car and heavily injured. Meanwhile, Stephanie, a woman Paula knew in college, comes for a visit, as she is having problems with her marriage. Despite the harm ensued on him, the car who hit him is suing, saying that he was the cause of the accident. Paula asks Stephanie to take Brendon to court, but she gets into an argument with her husband, forcing McGuirk to take Brendon, and he represents the boy, but his mediocre legal tactics leads the judge to order both Brendon and McGuirk to write an essay on road safety. Stephanie proves to be a terrible house guest and comes home drunk one night with a man she met while out. Brendon decides that he will make a movie, but demonizes the drivers and expresses his anger at the judge for punishing him in such a way. The judge is insulted by the video and orders him to do community service, and the Smalls are fined for the damages to the car that hit Brendon. Despite losing the case, Brendon tells the judge he learn nothing much to the judge's dismay and tries to scold Brendon. However, Brendon rudely stops him and tells him that this is over. Paula kicks Stephanie out, while McGuirk is arrested for not handing in his assignment, just as his pet goldfish dies.
13	13	"Brendon's Choice"	Loren Bouchard	Brendon Small, Bill Braudis & Loren Bouchard	October 7, 2001	113	N/A
Brendon, Jason, and Melissa's film Fat Her wins an award at an annual film festival. A news crew decides to do a story on their success and interview them about details of the film and of their lives. When the newswoman asks Brendon about his father, he has nothing to say as his parents are divorced and he never got to know his father. Curious, he nervously asks his mother about him, and she tells him that when she calls him at the end of the month, the two of them can talk. Meanwhile, McGuirk is forced by the school to take anger management classes. The courses go terribly, as McGuirk keeps feuding with the teacher. When the news story airs, Brendon, Jason, and Melissa get upset that the newswoman does not show any of the footage she took of them. The episode ends with Brendon's father calling him.

== Home release ==
The DVD boxset for season one was released by Shout! Factory on November 16, 2004. Other than all thirteen episodes of the season, the DVD included several bonus features, including interviews with the cast and crew, animatics, an animation gallery, commentary tracks on ten episodes, and two short films created by Small and Benjamin.

The Complete First Season
Set Details	Special Features
13 episodes; 3-disc set; 1.33:1 aspect ratio; English (Dolby Digital 5.1); Subtitles	Optional commentary on ten episodes: Disc 1: "Get Away From My Mom," "The Art of the Sucker Punch," "Brendon Gets Rabies" and "Yoko"; Disc 2: "Director's Cut" and "It Was Supposed to be Funny"; Disc 3: "School Nurse," "Mortgages and Marbles," and "Brendon's Choice." Additional commentary on animatics for "School Nurse."; Animatics; Animation galleries; Interviews with the cast and crew; Short films by Brendon Small and H. Jon Benjamin; Easter egg
Release Dates	Optional commentary on ten episodes: Disc 1: "Get Away From My Mom," "The Art of the Sucker Punch," "Brendon Gets Rabies" and "Yoko"; Disc 2: "Director's Cut" and "It Was Supposed to be Funny"; Disc 3: "School Nurse," "Mortgages and Marbles," and "Brendon's Choice." Additional commentary on animatics for "School Nurse."; Animatics; Animation galleries; Interviews with the cast and crew; Short films by Brendon Small and H. Jon Benjamin; Easter egg
Region 1	Optional commentary on ten episodes: Disc 1: "Get Away From My Mom," "The Art of the Sucker Punch," "Brendon Gets Rabies" and "Yoko"; Disc 2: "Director's Cut" and "It Was Supposed to be Funny"; Disc 3: "School Nurse," "Mortgages and Marbles," and "Brendon's Choice." Additional commentary on animatics for "School Nurse."; Animatics; Animation galleries; Interviews with the cast and crew; Short films by Brendon Small and H. Jon Benjamin; Easter egg
November 16, 2004	Optional commentary on ten episodes: Disc 1: "Get Away From My Mom," "The Art of the Sucker Punch," "Brendon Gets Rabies" and "Yoko"; Disc 2: "Director's Cut" and "It Was Supposed to be Funny"; Disc 3: "School Nurse," "Mortgages and Marbles," and "Brendon's Choice." Additional commentary on animatics for "School Nurse."; Animatics; Animation galleries; Interviews with the cast and crew; Short films by Brendon Small and H. Jon Benjamin; Easter egg

== See also ==
- Home Movies
- List of Home Movies episodes
