= Home Movies season 2 =

Home Movies
- Season 2
- DVD cover
- No. of episodes: 13

Release
- Original network: Adult Swim
- Original release: January 6 – March 31, 2002

Season chronology
- ← Previous; Season 1 Next → Season 3

The second season of the animated sitcom Home Movies aired in the United States on Cartoon Network’s programming block Adult Swim from January 6 to March 31, 2002. Every Sunday and Thursday night at 9:00 p.m. Central time and 10:00 p.m. Eastern Time. Co-creators Brendon Small and Loren Bouchard, along with Tom Snyder, served as the executive producers for the season. Small and Bill Braudis acted as writers for the season, while Bouchard was director for each episode.

The season follows 8-year-old Brendon Small, who writes, directs, and stars in homemade film productions that he creates with his friends Melissa and Jason, as he gets to know his father, who is remarrying. His mother Paula struggles with finding a new job after being fired from her position as a creative writing teacher at a local college. Meanwhile, Brendon and Melissa's soccer coach, John McGuirk, is a short-tempered, selfish alcoholic who constantly gives the two morally bankrupt advice.

The main cast for the season consisted of Small, Janine Ditullio, H. Jon Benjamin, and Melissa Bardin Galsky. Louis C.K. also served as a recurring guest star throughout the season as Brendon's father. Though the first season of the series utilized producer Snyder's "squigglevision" animation style, season 2 was redesigned to a more "conventional" Flash animation style. Viewers felt that the new look was more attractive and easily accessible in comparison to the previous season.

The complete season DVD was released by Shout! Factory on May 31, 2005, a few months after the release of the first season DVD. It contained all thirteen episodes along with an assortment of bonus features, including optional episode commentary and animatics.

== Episodes ==
No. overall	No. in season	Title	Directed by	Written by	Original release date	Prod. code
14	1	"Politics"	Loren Bouchard	Brendon Small & Bill Braudis	January 6, 2002	201
Brendon decides to run for class president against three-time winner Therman, with bully Shannon in support. Brendon wins the race and sees Therman injured, wearing a cast and holding crutches. Brendon believes Shannon beat up Therman and rigged the ballot but does not act on it, reluctantly putting him in office as well. Shannon wreaks havoc on the school, vandalizing and stealing people's possessions, and Mr. Lynch suggests that Brendon fires him or he might not get into a decent film school. Brendon decides to step down from office, only to learn that Shannon did not rig the vote and Therman merely just injured himself. Meanwhile, McGuirk becomes a stand-up comic at a comedy club called Laugh, Damn It! Nobody laughs at his jokes and he is booed off stage. He ends up getting drunk and passing out on the beach.
15	2	"Identifying a Body"	Loren Bouchard	Brendon Small & Bill Braudis	January 13, 2002	202
The annual walkathon is coming up and Mr. Lynch hopes to finally collect more money than the fifth graders. Brendon collects $50 from Paula, but while going with Coach McGuirk to identify the latter's dead uncle, he ends up spending it all on McGuirk's chores. McGuirk promises to pay him back with his uncle's inheritance, but learns that all he has been left with is a surprisingly delicious old sausage. Brendon tries collecting more money, but is robbed by a man. He does not do anything as he believes the man is blindness
16	3	"Hiatus"	Loren Bouchard	Brendon Small & Bill Braudis	January 20, 2002	203
Brendon, Melissa, and Jason's new film ends up being terrible and they all decide to take a hiatus from making movies and from each other. Brendon and Melissa each find nothing to do, but Jason begins hanging out with two ambiguously gay boys named Perry and Walter. Brendon eventually goes over to musician Dwayne's house to tape some choreographed dance numbers, becoming enamoured with their choreographer Cynthia, and decides to become Dwayne's band Scäb's stage boy. He accidentally electrocutes Dwayne during a performance and is fired. Jason becomes annoyed with Perry and Walter's jabbering and ends his friendship with them. The kids decide never to take a hiatus again. Meanwhile, McGuirk plans a trip to Mexico and invites Mr. Lynch to go with him. Lynch tries teaching McGuirk Spanish but he retains nothing. When they go to Mexico, Lynch gets drunk at a bar and, as he is the only one who knows Spanish, the two are unable to find their hotel. Paula is fired from her job as a creative writing teacher at a local college, and Mr. Lindenson does his best to console her and hope that she does not kill him in anger, despite getting injured throughout the ordeal through his own incompetence.
17	4	"Business and Pleasure"	Loren Bouchard	Brendon Small & Bill Braudis	January 27, 2002	204
During filming of the kids' new movie, Jason keeps going into scenes he is not in. Jason invites Brendon for a sleepover at his house, which Brendon accepts, but only if they do not talk about "business". Despite this, Jason keeps bringing up his small role in the new film and Brendon goes home. At 4:00 a.m., Jason calls a half-asleep Brendon over the phone and keeps him up all night. Brendon ends up showing up late for soccer practice the next day, making McGuirk believe he is doing drugs and tries to perform an Intervention (counseling) intervention with the team. Brendon rewrites the script several times to please Jason, and then Melissa after she feels left out and manipulates Paula. Meanwhile, Erik tries to get Paula a new job but all the interviews fail. She finally gets a job as a computer programmer after lying, but she quits because she has no idea what to do. In the end, Brendon is given the smaller part in the film, with both Jason and Melissa receiving the lead roles.
18	5	"The Party"	Loren Bouchard	Brendon Small & Bill Braudis	February 3, 2002	205
Classmate Fenton Mewley's birthday is approaching, and his mother Trudy asks Brendon to make a video for her son's birthday party, as the two "befriended" each other after being locked in school together. Brendon uses the video to film himself making fun of Fenton, as he does not like him, but when he goes to the party and sees Trudy so happy with him, he wants to change it immediately. Fenton acts inconsiderate and rude throughout the party, yelling at his mother and berating everyone for their mediocre presents. Brendon shows a new film, which is footage of Fenton yelling at everyone and acting like a brat, causing Fenton to get angry at Brendon and his mother. McGuirk shows up and yells at Fenton for his behavior, encouraging Trudy to take control of her son, punishing him while deciding to spend some time with McGuirk. Throughout the party, Jason begins consuming large amounts of soda and junk food, causing Melissa to grow concerned about his sugar addiction, sending him home when she can, but he returns regardless.
19	6	"Impressions"	Loren Bouchard	Brendon Small & Bill Braudis	February 10, 2002	206
While composing a score for a new film entitled Starboy and the Captain of Outer Space, Brendon falls for Scäb's choreographer, Cynthia. He asks her out on a date and they go to Jason's parents' country club, convincing her that it is his country club. He tries ordering sandwiches on Jason's account, but the waiter soon realizes that he is not Jason and kicks them out when Dwayne and his friends crash the club, causing Cynthia to hate him. Paula, meanwhile, needs to take a typing test in order to sign up at a placement agency, but she gets terrible test anxiety, resulting in her simply handing in the test copy during her second exam. Both she and Brendon are berated by their authority figures, culminating in them being on the phone with each other during the arguments. In the meantime, McGuirk calls women in his yearbook, hoping to find a date. He asks one woman out, telling her that he is something he is not, but she dumps him after he comes clean.
20	7	"Dad"	Loren Bouchard	Brendon Small & Bill Braudis	February 17, 2002	207
Brendon finally gets to meet his father, Andrew, who he has not met, as his parents divorced shortly after he started making movies. They go to the zoo to meet Andrew's fiance Linda, who is rude and constantly complaining. Brendon spends the night at his father's apartment and the next morning, Linda yells at Andrew for not waking her up and making her late for work. Paula invites the couple over to her house, where Brendon shows his father his film set and lets him watch his latest film which parallels Andrew's relationship with Linda. When Brendon asks Linda if she has ever seen his father nude, the couple leave. Meanwhile, McGuirk gets a Little Brother named Eddie, who is mentally challenged and easily injured, particularly when he brings Eddie to soccer practice. Eddie moves to Arizona, so McGuirk gets a new Little Brother in the form of a juvenile delinquency
21	8	"Therapy"	Loren Bouchard	Brendon Small & Bill Braudis	February 24, 2002	208
Andrew, Linda, and Brendon begin attending therapy in order to strengthen their dysfunctional relationship. During one session, Brendon shows the therapist his new film about a shrinking king who is being conspired against and the therapist opts that Brendon is the cause of the dysfunction due to his frustration over his father remarrying. Brendon asks for advice on if he truly is the source from Paula and McGuirk, but neither are of any help. Brendon begins to learn that he is attracted to Linda, and that he's really just jealous that his father is marrying her. In the next session, Brendon acts passive aggressive towards Linda and the therapist suggests that all of them act more calmly towards people around them. The technique further adds to their hostility and makes them more easily agitated, so they end up canceling further sessions.
22	9	"Class Trip"	Loren Bouchard	Brendon Small & Bill Braudis	March 3, 2002	209
The kids are hoping to film their new picture in a five-star hotel their class is visiting for a field trip. They run into a problem when they realize Paula will be chaperoning, so they are extra cautious as they sneak away from the rest of the class upon arrival at the hotel. They are lucky that Paula and Mr. Lynch's attention is taken by Alyson, another student prone to sneaking away. While filming one scene in a hotel room that they get the key for, two guests arrive and they are forced to flee. Meanwhile, McGuirk must find a side job in order to pay for damages to the principal's car after he throws a faulty coffee maker out of the teacher's lounge window. He tries at a fast food joint, but his background check causes him to be turned down. He lands a job at a space-themed cafe next to the field trip hotel after lying and saying that his name is "Brendon Small". The kids run into the coffee shop while running from the hotel and are surprised to see McGuirk there. The class desperately searches for them and find them in the shop, leading to McGuirk's lie to finally be revealed. He is fired from the job and everyone goes home. Meanwhile, Alyson is tracked down to the airport.
23	10	"History"	Loren Bouchard	Brendon Small & Bill Braudis	March 10, 2002	210
Brendon is failing history and is surprised as he is getting tutoring from McGuirk, not realizing that his coach knows nothing about history. Lynch suggest that he gets an after-school tutor, but he is unsure as he is focusing hard on his movies. Soon he begins considering if McGuirk is the cause of his failing grades. McGuirk is insulted from this claim and they argue, but soon make up. He gives him some terrible tips for Brendon's latest test, but Brendon still fails. Meanwhile, the kids film a new sci-fi picture entitled Starboy and the Captain of Outer Space. In the film, George Washington (Brendon), Annie Oakley (Melissa), and Picasso (Jason) plan on destroying Earth with Washington's evil cat Mr. Pants (Dwayne), and killing their hostages: William Shakespeare (Walter), Oliver Twist (Perry), and the Mermaid Queen (Junior Adelberg). The titular Starboy (Brendon) and sidekick Captain of Outer Space (Jason) rush to stop them and compliment Mr. Pants as defeat. The cat turns on the villains and hurtles them into space. After Brendon shows Paula the movie he made, she says she is concerned about Brendon failing the test. She says the bad news is that he is grounded, but the good news is that she's not letting him use his camera for two weeks.
24	11	"Writer's Block"	Loren Bouchard	Brendon Small & Bill Braudis	March 17, 2002	211
A sudden writer's block threatens Brendon's upcoming part in the school writer's fair. After many failed attempts at a script, he and the kids improvise their performance at the fair, which is a surprise hit with the audience. Meanwhile, McGuirk suffers from insomnia, so he participates in a insomniac study at a university. He eventually wants to leave the study after realizing that it will not cure his insomnia but soon learns he can use the money to buy a new DVD player. After seven days, he finally falls asleep and is kicked out of the study, right before he can get the money he needs to buy the DVD player.
25	12	"Pizza Club"	Loren Bouchard	Brendon Small & Bill Braudis	March 24, 2002	212
Brendon and his father form a "Pizza Club", consisting of them simply going to the local pizza restaurant and talking about how their lives are going. McGuirk learns of this, taking it literally and believing that he is being excluded from an "exclusive" club. He openly expresses his distraught to Brendon, and though Brendon explains that it is not really a club, he still is ignorant and holds strong to his disgust. He decides to form his own "Pizza Club" with Walter and Perry, but soon becomes intensely annoyed by them and abandons the club. Brendon and Andrew finally decide to have him join the "club". Meanwhile, Paula begins showing interest in being a part of the kids' films. She keeps walking into shots and trying to work her way into their films, so they finally decide to give her a minor role in their latest project.
26	13	"The Wedding"	Loren Bouchard	Brendon Small & Bill Braudis	March 31, 2002	213
Linda and Andrew's wedding day finally arrives with several problematic side effects. Brendon develops an anxiety-induced rash, and even though he attempts to ignore it, it spreads all over his body and covers him in disgusting puss and bumps. On the day of the wedding, Jason and Melissa lock him in a room until it calms down, but he becomes disoriented and bursts out in the middle of the ceremony, but he soon passes out. Paula, too, becomes stressed about her ex-husband's remarriage and becomes more flustered when she accidentally orders baby trees instead of flowers for the wedding and when they discover the wedding was double-booked with a funeral. Meanwhile, Paula's college friend Stephanie returns to attend the wedding. She brings McGuirk to her hotel room and disrobes completely, evidently seducing him and requesting a massage. McGuirk uncomfortably stands in the same spot and misinterprets all of her flirtation, such as suggesting pills or a heating pad for her back pain. Eventually, McGuirk uncomfortably exits the room and wishes her parents a happy retirement, never having removed his coat.

== Home release ==
The DVD boxset for season two was released by Shout! Factory on May 31, 2005. Small originally announced that it would come out on June 10 on his official website, but Shout! Factory later unconfirmed this and released the official date. Other than all thirteen episodes of the season, the DVD included several bonus features, including interviews with the cast and crew, animatics, an animation gallery, commentary tracks selected episodes, and extended musical numbers from the series.

The Complete Second Season
Set Details	Special Features
13 episodes; 3-disc set; 1.33:1 aspect ratio; English (Dolby Digital 5.1); Subtitles	Optional commentary on selected episodes; Animatics; Commentary on animatics for "History"; Animation galleries; Interviews with the cast and crew; Guest stars reminisce about Home Movies; "Audio Anatomy of a Scene"; Winning entry of the "Small Shorts" contest; Extended musical numbers and lessons
Release Dates	Optional commentary on selected episodes; Animatics; Commentary on animatics for "History"; Animation galleries; Interviews with the cast and crew; Guest stars reminisce about Home Movies; "Audio Anatomy of a Scene"; Winning entry of the "Small Shorts" contest; Extended musical numbers and lessons
Region 1	Optional commentary on selected episodes; Animatics; Commentary on animatics for "History"; Animation galleries; Interviews with the cast and crew; Guest stars reminisce about Home Movies; "Audio Anatomy of a Scene"; Winning entry of the "Small Shorts" contest; Extended musical numbers and lessons
May 31, 2005	Optional commentary on selected episodes; Animatics; Commentary on animatics for "History"; Animation galleries; Interviews with the cast and crew; Guest stars reminisce about Home Movies; "Audio Anatomy of a Scene"; Winning entry of the "Small Shorts" contest; Extended musical numbers and lessons

== See also ==
- Home Movies
- List of Home Movies episodes
- "Get Away From My Mom"
- "The Art of the Sucker Punch"
