= The Art of the Sucker Punch =

- Home Movies episode
- Brendon and Shannon prepare to fight in Brendon's documentary.
- Episode no.: Season 1 Episode 3
- Directed by: Loren Bouchard
- Written by: Brendon Small; Loren Bouchard; H. Jon Benjamin; Paula Poundstone; Melissa Bardin Galsky
- Original air date: May 10, 1999

Guest appearance
- Emo Philips as Shannon

Episode chronology
← Previous "I Don't Do Well in Parent-Teacher Conferences"	Next → "Brendon Gets Rabies"
- Home Movies (season 1)

"The Art of the Sucker Punch" is the third episode of the first season of the American animated sitcom Home Movies. It originally aired on the UPN network on May 10, 1999. The episode concerns a confrontation between Brendon Small and local bully Shannon, after Brendon discovers Shannon has been physically harassing his friend Jason. Brendon decides to record his preparation for the fight, as well as the fight itself, in order to create a documentary.

"The Art of the Sucker Punch" was written using "retroscripting," where each cast member completely improvised their lines, though certain script material was provided by co-creator and episode director Loren Bouchard. The episode was based on an experience co-creator and lead voice actor Brendon Small had at his school in his childhood with a bully. Comedian Emo Philips guest starred in the episode as Shannon.

In its original broadcast, "The Art of the Sucker Punch" received a 1.0/2 Nielsen Rating, continuing a streak of low ratings the series had been receiving since the pilot episode. Despite very low ratings, the episode received generally positive reviews, with multiple commentators noting its portrayal of relatable life problems.

== Plot ==
Aspiring filmmaker and eight-year-old Brendon Small discovers that his best friend, Jason, has been physically harassed by local neighborhood bully Shannon on a daily basis. Vowing vengeance on Shannon for this crime, Brendon challenges the bully to a brawl, despite lacking both the physical aptitude and knowledge to actually engage in a fight. Despite this, he starts training and records the entire training process, deciding to turn it into a documentary, implying that his actual motives behind the fight was to just create such a film about himself. Throughout his training process, several members of his community note their complete disbelief in Brendon's chances of actually coming out of the fight victoriously.

The day of the fight finally comes, but when Brendon goes to engage Shannon, he is knocked to the ground immediately by a knee to the face. Despite this, Shannon calls Brendon the next day and invites him, Jason, and their friend Melissa to his birthday party, which Brendon resentfully accepts. When the kids arrive at Shannon's party, they see that no one has arrived. Shannon laments about how his bullying ways have caused no one he knows to actually like him, and the kids sympathize with the bully. However, Shannon then reveals that there are several kids at the party, who come out from hiding spots and ridicule Brendon, Jason, and Melissa for being swindled. As their retaliation, the children steal Shannon's lawn gnome and depart from the party.

== Production ==
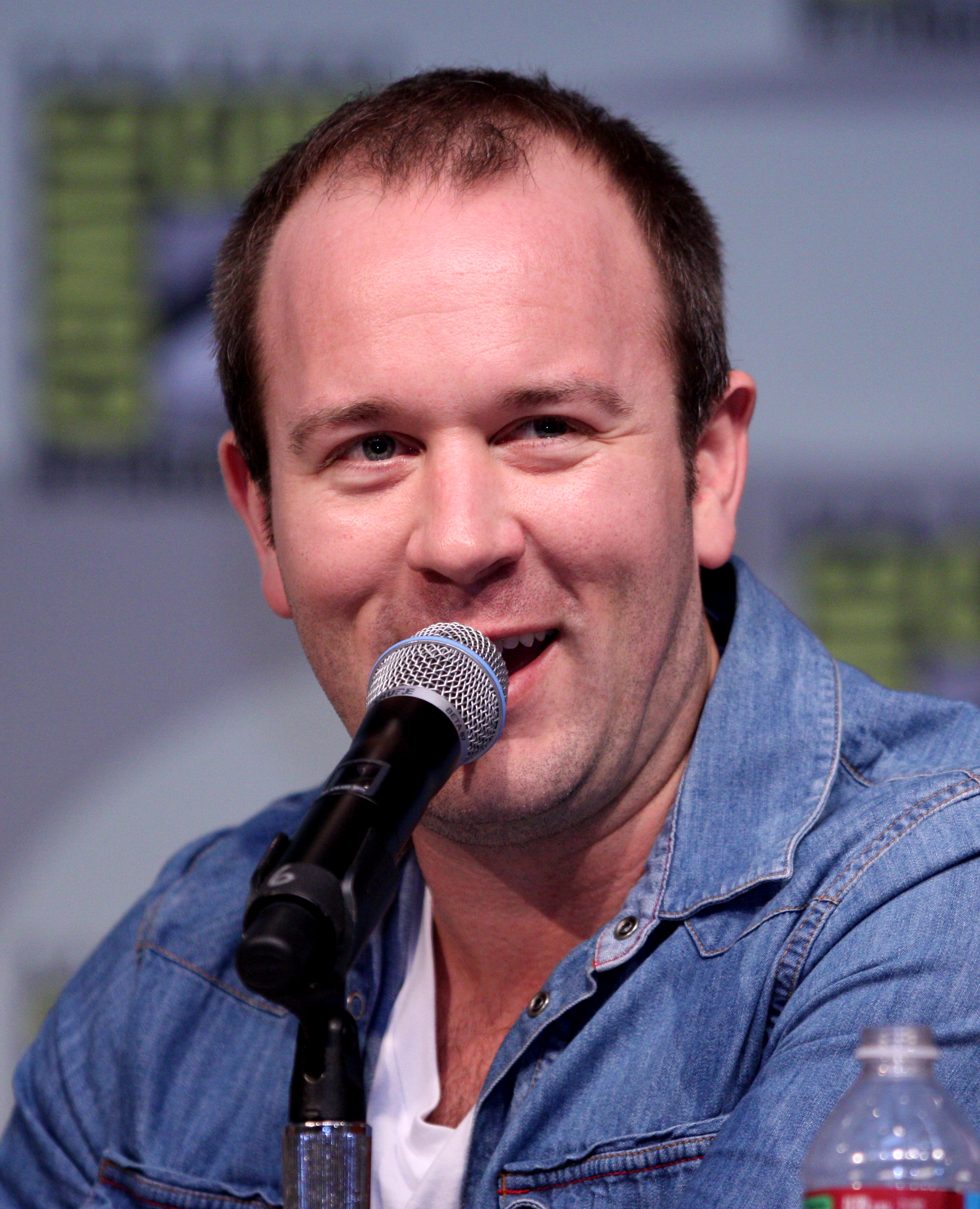
The episode was based on an experience series co-creator Brendon Small had with a bully.

"The Art of the Sucker Punch" was inspired by a confrontation series co-creator Brendon Small had with a school bully when he was a child. The episode, as with the other first four episodes of the series, demonstrated a writing style known as "retroscripting," in which the cast completely improvised their lines. In order to convincingly make the child characters sound like actual children despite being portrayed by adults, recordings of the actors' performance in the episode were electronically altered.

Bouchard directed the episode, a role he filled for the entirety of the series' production run. Along with the rest of the first season, the episode was animated through the usage of "squigglevision," a technique pioneered by the show's executive producer, Tom Sydner. The animation style consists of eight frames of looped "zigzagged" lines that stimulate the character's mouth movement. This style was used to produce the series on its incredibly low budget and allow for the actors to improvise. The animation style was eventually changed during the second season to Flash animation, which was believed to be a more conventional style.

"The Art of the Sucker Punch" is available on the DVD Home Movies: The Complete First Season, which was released on November 16, 2004. A bonus feature on the DVD allows for an optional audio commentary track, recorded by Small, Bouchard, and Benjamin, to play over the episode. Though generally being meant to be humorous and entertaining, the track also details actual information on the episode's production cycle.

== Reception ==
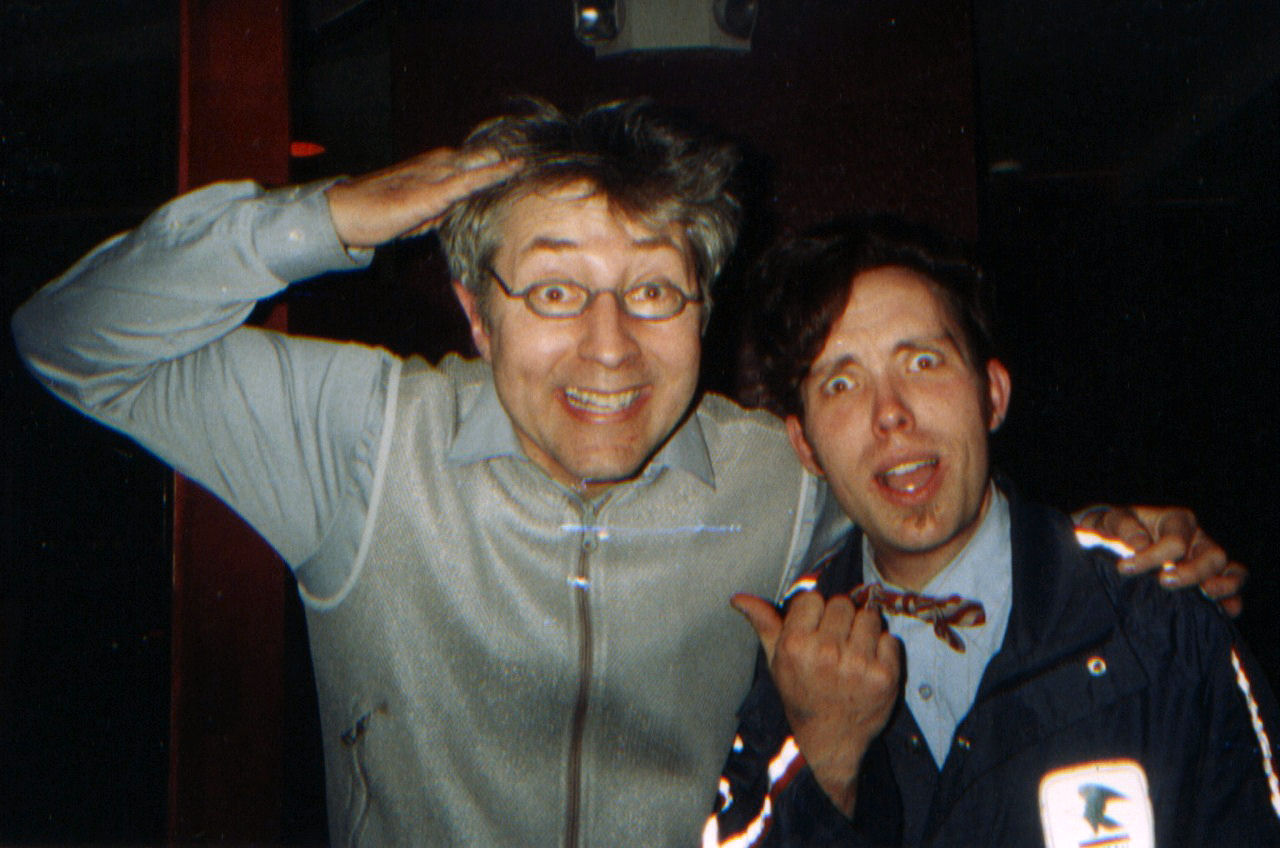
Emo Philips (left) made his first guest appearance of the series in the episode as Shannon.

"The Art of the Sucker Punch" originally aired on the UPN television network on May 10, 1999. In this broadcast, the episode received a Nielsen rating of 1.0/2, which placed it as only the 114th most watched network television program of the week. In total, UPN averaged a 1.8 Nielsen rating with a 3% share of cable audiences that week. This continued a strand of poor ratings Home Movies had been receiving since its original broadcast. The pilot episode, "Get Away From My Mom," received a Nielsen rating of 1.4/2 and placing as the 133rd most watched television program of the week. The following episode, "I Don't Do Well in Parent-Teacher Conferences," was slightly higher, with a 1.4/2 Nielsen rating again, but ranking as the 113th television program that week.

The episode has received generally positive reviews. In his book, Drawn to Television: Prime-time Animation from The Flintstones to Family Guy, M. Keith Booker cited the episode as an example of the series' prolific implication of simple, modern themes as a means of comedy. DVD Verdict reviewer David Ryan similarly wrote that the episode relied on a humor that was both easy to identify with and added a "tremendous amount of humor." Conversely, reaction to the Shannon character has been much more critical. In his review for the series' fourth season DVD, DVD Talk's Francis Rizzo listed the character on his compilation of elements in the show he had a strong distaste for.
