= List of Home Movies episodes =

align

This is a list of episodes for the American animated television series Home Movies. The series began with "Get Away From My Mom", which was broadcast on April 26, 1999, by UPN, which showed the first five episodes premiered before it was cancelled. The series was revived by Cartoon Network's Adult Swim, which showed the remaining episodes from season one, and ordered three additional seasons. The series officially ended with "Focus Grill" on April 4, 2004, with a total of 52 episodes over the course of four seasons. The entire series is available on DVD.

== Series overview ==
Season	Episodes		Originally released		
Season	Episodes		First released	Last released	Network
1	13	5	April 26, 1999	May 24, 1999	UPN
1	13	8	September 2, 2001	October 7, 2001	Adult Swim
2	13		January 6, 2002	March 31, 2002	Adult Swim
3	13		August 4, 2002	May 25, 2003	Adult Swim
4	13		November 11, 2003	April 4, 2004	Adult Swim

== Episodes ==
=== Season 1 (1999-2001) ===
No. overall	No. in season	Title	Directed by	Written by	Original release date	Prod. code	Viewers (millions)
UPN
1	1	"Get Away From My Mom"	Loren Bouchard	Brendon Small, Loren Bouchard, H. Jon Benjamin, Paula Poundstone & Melissa Bardin Galsky	April 26, 1999	101	1.76
2	2	"I Don't Do Well in Parent-Teacher Conferences"	Loren Bouchard	Brendon Small, Loren Bouchard, H. Jon Benjamin, Paula Poundstone & Melissa Bardin Galsky	May 3, 1999	102	1.45
3	3	"The Art of the Sucker Punch"	Loren Bouchard	Brendon Small, Loren Bouchard, H. Jon Benjamin, Paula Poundstone & Melissa Bardin Galsky	May 10, 1999	103	1.83
4	4	"Brendon Gets Rabies"	Loren Bouchard	Brendon Small, Loren Bouchard, H. Jon Benjamin, Paula Poundstone & Melissa Bardin Galsky	May 17, 1999	104	1.84
5	5	"Yoko" "We'll Always Have Tuesday"	Loren Bouchard	Brendon Small, Loren Bouchard, H. Jon Benjamin, Paula Poundstone & Melissa Bardin Galsky	May 24, 1999	105	1.72
Adult Swim
6	6	"Director's Cut"	Loren Bouchard	Brendon Small, Bill Braudis & Loren Bouchard	September 2, 2001	106	N/A
7	7	"It Was Supposed to Be Funny"	Loren Bouchard	Brendon Small, Bill Braudis & Loren Bouchard	September 9, 2001	107	N/A
8	8	"Method of Acting"	Loren Bouchard	Brendon Small, Bill Braudis & Loren Bouchard	September 16, 2001	108	N/A
9	9	"Life Through a Fish Eye Lens"	Loren Bouchard	Brendon Small, Bill Braudis & Loren Bouchard	September 23, 2001	109	N/A
10	10	"School Nurse"	Loren Bouchard	Brendon Small, Bill Braudis & Loren Bouchard	September 30, 2001	110	N/A
11	11	"Mortgages and Marbles"	Loren Bouchard	Brendon Small, Bill Braudis & Loren Bouchard	September 30, 2001	111	N/A
12	12	"Law and Boarder"	Loren Bouchard	Brendon Small, Bill Braudis & Loren Bouchard	October 7, 2001	112	N/A
13	13	"Brendon's Choice"	Loren Bouchard	Brendon Small, Bill Braudis & Loren Bouchard	October 7, 2001	113	N/A

=== Season 2 (2002) ===
No. overall	No. in season	Title	Directed by	Written by	Original release date	Prod. code
14	1	"Politics"	Loren Bouchard	Brendon Small & Bill Braudis	January 6, 2002	201
15	2	"Identifying a Body"	Loren Bouchard	Brendon Small & Bill Braudis	January 13, 2002	202
16	3	"Hiatus"	Loren Bouchard	Brendon Small & Bill Braudis	January 20, 2002	203
17	4	"Business and Pleasure"	Loren Bouchard	Brendon Small & Bill Braudis	January 27, 2002	204
18	5	"The Party"	Loren Bouchard	Brendon Small & Bill Braudis	February 3, 2002	205
19	6	"Impressions"	Loren Bouchard	Brendon Small & Bill Braudis	February 10, 2002	206
20	7	"Dad"	Loren Bouchard	Brendon Small & Bill Braudis	February 17, 2002	207
21	8	"Therapy"	Loren Bouchard	Brendon Small & Bill Braudis	February 24, 2002	208
22	9	"Class Trip"	Loren Bouchard	Brendon Small & Bill Braudis	March 3, 2002	209
23	10	"History"	Loren Bouchard	Brendon Small & Bill Braudis	March 10, 2002	210
24	11	"Writer's Block"	Loren Bouchard	Brendon Small & Bill Braudis	March 17, 2002	211
25	12	"Pizza Club"	Loren Bouchard	Brendon Small & Bill Braudis	March 24, 2002	212
26	13	"The Wedding"	Loren Bouchard	Brendon Small & Bill Braudis	March 31, 2002	213

=== Season 3 (2002–03) ===
No. overall	No. in season	Title	Directed by	Written by	Original release date	Prod. code
27	1	"Shore Leave"	Loren Bouchard	Brendon Small & Bill Braudis	August 4, 2002	301
28	2	"Breaking Up Is Hard To Do"	Loren Bouchard	Brendon Small & Bill Braudis	August 11, 2002	302
29	3	"Bad Influences"	Loren Bouchard	Brendon Small & Bill Braudis	August 18, 2002	303
30	4	"Improving Your Life Through Improv" "Sensitivity"	Loren Bouchard	Brendon Small & Bill Braudis	August 25, 2002	304
31	5	"Four's Company"	Loren Bouchard	Brendon Small & Bill Braudis	October 6, 2002	307
32	6	"Renaissance"	Loren Bouchard	Brendon Small & Bill Braudis	October 13, 2002	305
33	7	"My Cheatin' Heart"	Loren Bouchard	Brendon Small & Bill Braudis	October 20, 2002	306
34	8	"Guitarmageddon"	Loren Bouchard	Brendon Small & Bill Braudis	October 27, 2002	308
35	9	"Storm Warning"	Loren Bouchard	Brendon Small & Bill Braudis	November 3, 2002	310
36	10	"Time To Pay The Price" "A Life In The Day"	Loren Bouchard	Brendon Small & Bill Braudis	November 10, 2002	309
37	11	"Broken Dreams" "That Smarts"	Loren Bouchard	Brendon Small & Bill Braudis	November 17, 2002	311
38	12	"Stowaway"	Loren Bouchard	Brendon Small & Bill Braudis	November 24, 2002	312
39	13	"Coffins and Cradles"	Loren Bouchard	Brendon Small & Bill Braudis	May 25, 2003	313

=== Season 4 (2003–04) ===
No. overall	No. in season	Title	Directed by	Written by	Original release date	Prod. code
40	1	"Everyone's Entitled to My Opinion"	Loren Bouchard	Loren Bouchard, Brendon Small & Bill Braudis	November 11, 2003	401
41	2	"Camp"	Loren Bouchard	H. Jon Benjamin, Brendon Small & Bill Braudis	January 11, 2004	409
42	3	"Bye Bye Greasy"	Loren Bouchard	Loren Bouchard, H. Jon Benjamin, Brendon Small & Bill Braudis	January 18, 2004	410
43	4	"The Heart Smashers"	Loren Bouchard	Loren Bouchard, H. Jon Benjamin, Brendon Small & Bill Braudis	January 25, 2004	402
44	5	"The Wizard's Baker"	Loren Bouchard	Loren Bouchard, H. Jon Benjamin, Brendon Small & Bill Braudis	February 8, 2004	403
45	6	"Psycho-Delicate"	Loren Bouchard	Loren Bouchard, H. Jon Benjamin, Brendon Small & Bill Braudis	February 15, 2004	404
46	7	"Curses"	Loren Bouchard	Loren Bouchard, H. Jon Benjamin, Brendon Small & Bill Braudis	February 22, 2004	405
47	8	"Honkey Magoo"	Loren Bouchard	Loren Bouchard, H. Jon Benjamin, Brendon Small & Bill Braudis	February 29, 2004	406
48	9	"Those Bitches Tried to Cheat Me"	Loren Bouchard	Loren Bouchard, H. Jon Benjamin, Brendon Small & Bill Braudis	March 7, 2004	407
49	10	"Cho and the Adventures of Amy Lee"	Loren Bouchard	Loren Bouchard, H. Jon Benjamin, Brendon Small & Bill Braudis	March 14, 2004	408
50	11	"Definite Possible Murder"	Loren Bouchard	Loren Bouchard, H. Jon Benjamin, Brendon Small & Bill Braudis	March 21, 2004	411
51	12	"Temporary Blindness"	Loren Bouchard	Loren Bouchard, H. Jon Benjamin, Brendon Small & Bill Braudis	March 28, 2004	412
52	13	"Focus Grill"	Loren Bouchard	Loren Bouchard, Brendon Small & Bill Braudis	April 4, 2004	413

== See also ==
- Home Movies
- List of Home Movies characters
