= Get Away From My Mom =

- Home Movies episode
- Brendon acts up during soccer practice.
- Episode no.: Season 1 Episode 1
- Directed by: Loren Bouchard
- Written by: Brendon Small; Loren Bouchard; H. Jon Benjamin; Paula Poundstone; Melissa Bardin Galsky
- Original air date: April 26, 1999

Guest appearance
- Jonathan Katz as Erik

Episode chronology
← Previous —	Next → "I Don't Do Well in Parent-Teacher Conferences"
- Home Movies (season 1)

"Get Away From My Mom" is the pilot episode of the American animated sitcom Home Movies. It originally aired on the UPN network in the United States on April 26, 1999. In the episode, eight-year-old Brendon Small discovers that his mother, Paula, is set to have a date with Brendon's soccer coach, the lazy, profane alcoholic John McGuirk. Brendon resents McGuirk for this and expresses his outrage throughout the episode. The date goes terribly and McGuirk and Paula decide to not pursue a relationship. Meanwhile, Brendon and his friends Melissa and Jason film a new movie about a rogue police officer.

Production involved retroscripting, a process by which the actors completely improvised all dialogue, as the first time this technique was used for an animated television production. Certain script material was provided by series co-founder and director, Loren Bouchard. The pilot is based on the Squigglevision style of animation which was used for season 1. In its original broadcast, "Get Away From My Mom" received a 1.4/2 Nielsen Rating, the lowest UPN had ever received in that time slot. The episode received mixed reviews from television critics, particularly pertaining to its employment of improvisation.

== Plot ==
After soccer practice, eight-year-old aspiring filmmaker Brendon Small shows his mother Paula a self-made trailer for his upcoming film, The Dark Side of the Law, a crime film about a rogue police detective. Paula expresses indifference to the production. At breakfast the next morning, Paula informs Brendon she plans to go on a date that night with Brendon's soccer coach, John McGuirk, much to Brendon's chagrin. Brendon seeks advice from his friend Melissa and her father Erik, but they are unable to advise him as they are late for a violin recital.

When McGuirk shows up at Brendon's house for the date that night, Brendon tries to scare him off by acting as if he is his son, but it proves unsuccessful. During the date, Paula becomes agitated at McGuirk's inappropriate, boring subject matter, and she becomes drunk in order to entertain herself. Meanwhile, Brendon, Melissa, and their friend Jason film a scene from The Dark Side of the Law in Brendon's basement, where Brendon's character is in a French prison, confronted by his mother, played by Melissa. They stop filming when Jason's nose starts running, and he demonstrates how he can move the mucus up and down to their disgust.

At soccer practice the next day, Brendon—still upset with his mother's decision to date his coach—is uncooperative and chastises McGuirk for dating his mother, accusing him of desires to engage in a relationship with all the soccer players' mothers. While being driven home by Erik, Brendon asks Erik to fight McGuirk as revenge, but Erik denies his request and suggests he take his mind off the topic by playing a car game. Eventually, Brendon decides to apologize to McGuirk for his behavior, and the two reconcile. Later, McGuirk and Paula decide over the phone to end their relationship, a decision Brendon overhears using three-way calling.

At the next soccer game, Brendon's team plays poorly, and an opposing player injures Brendon, which causes McGuirk to yell at the referee. While sitting out, Brendon spots Erik and Paula engaging in meaningless and casual flirtation in the bleachers, which Brendon interprets as another possible relationship.

== Production ==
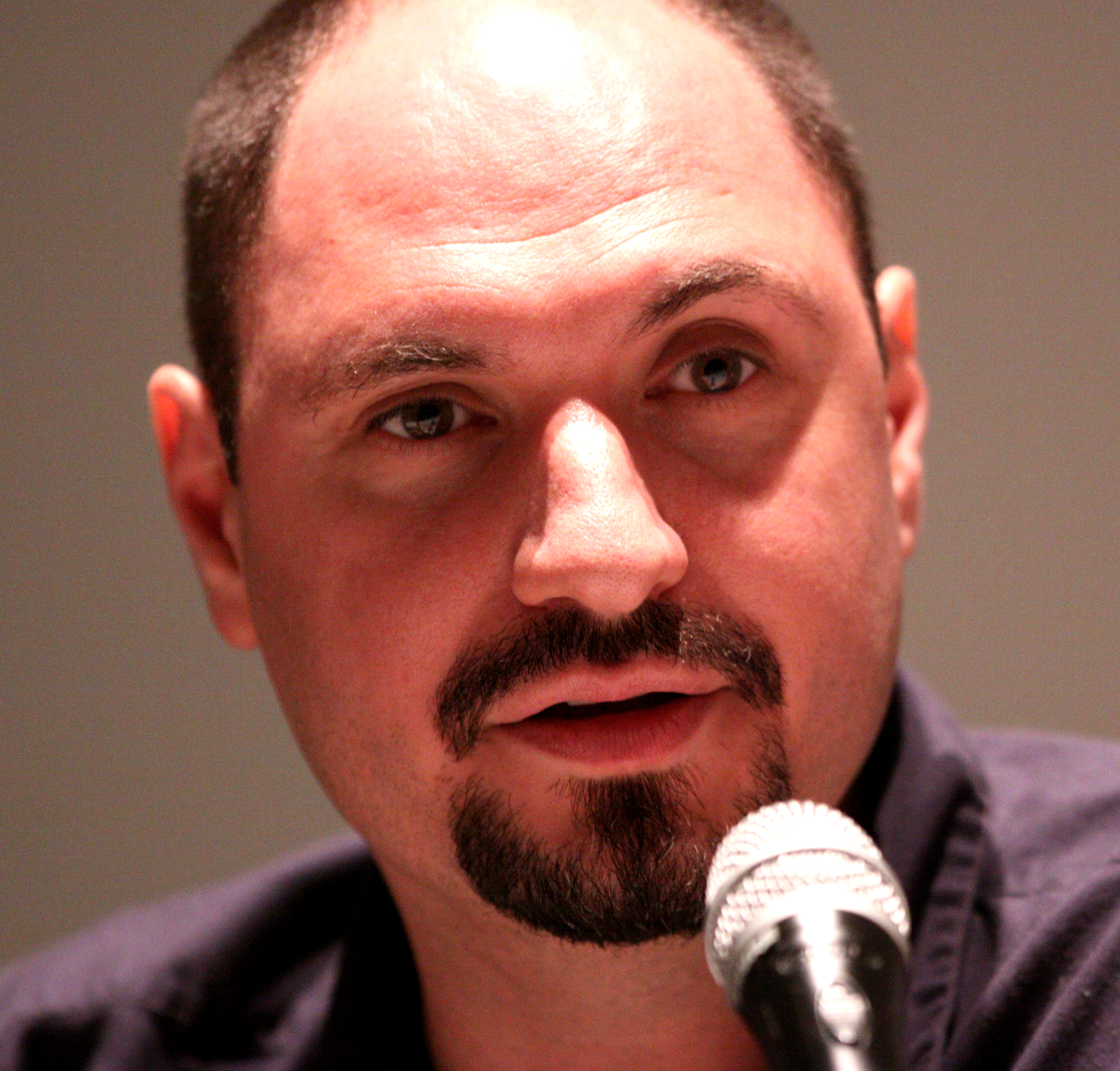
Co-creator Loren Bouchard directed "Get Away From My Mom".

"Get Away From My Mom" is the first episode of Home Movies, which was created by Brendon Small and Loren Bouchard. The first five episodes were made with retroscripting, the writing style in which the cast completely improvised lines. Main cast members Small, H. Jon Benjamin, Paula Poundstone, and Melissa Bardin Galsky wrote the episodes, and Bouchard also contributed to certain dialogue material. The episode is the first animated television production without a script.

Bouchard directed the entire series. Along with the rest of the first season, the episode was animated using "squigglevision," a technique pioneered by the show's executive producer, Tom Snyder. The animation style consists of eight frames of looped "zigzagged" lines that stimulate the character's mouth movement. This style was used to produce the series on its incredibly low budget and allow for the actors to improvise. The style was eventually changed during the second season to Flash animation, which was believed to be a more conventional style.

To make the young characters sound like children, instead of adults, recordings of the actors' performances were electronically altered. Galsky was cast as Melissa with no prior experience in voice acting, and she considers Bouchard the biggest benefactor to her career based on that decision. After recording sessions for "Get Away From My Mom" concluded, Small (who voices Brendon) and Benjamin (who plays McGuirk) went out to drink beers and to see a concert. According to Small, the experience contributed to their understanding of the unique dynamic between the characters.

"Get Away From My Mom" was released on the DVD Home Movies: The Complete First Season, on November 16, 2004.

== Reception ==
"Get Away From My Mom" was originally broadcast on April 26, 1999 on UPN at 8 p.m. The episode received a 1.4/2 Nielsen rating, positioning it at 133 in total viewership for 1999's May sweeps. This marked the lowest rated telecast the network had ever aired in its timeslot at the time.

The episode received generally mixed reviews from television critics. Writing for The Cincinnati Enquirer, John Kiesewetter criticized the show's use of improvised dialogue: "The uneven plot and sophomoric bodily function jokes sound like these people were making it up as they went along. And they were." Rob Owen, television critic for the Post-Gazette, paralleled Kiesewetter and said that the episode was a "pitfall" of the improvisation process: "The half-hour seems like a collection of scenes rather than a cohesive episode." Owen called it "so lackadaisical, it's hard to imagine UPN's most recently announced target audience - young males - having any patience for the program. The entertainment value is low", but did note that McGuirk's scenes in the episode were "the closest to ha-ha funny the show gets".

Conversely, John Levesque called the show a "keeper" in his review for the Seattle Post-Intelligencer and applauded the series subtle, improvised style. Chicago Sun-Times journalist Phil Rosenthal commended the episode. In his review, he wrote, "Rather than big laughs, it's more likely to elicit the grin of bemused recognition. It's not about sight gags or clever puns. It's not about parodying the sitcom form. This sweet ass series [...] is not always subtle - unless a child showing another how to have fun with a runny nose is intellectual - but it nicely plays off the inherent absurdities and weirdness of everyday modern life." Dennis Landmann of DVD Freak wrote that the episode "sets up the tone quite well, for it develops the aspirations of Brendon becoming a filmmaker" and praised the confrontations between McGuirk and Brendon.
