= Science Court =

Television series

- Also known as: Squigglevision
- Genre: animation/nontraditional court show
- Created by: Tom Snyder
- Developed by: Tom Snyder
- Written by: Bill Braudis; David Dockterman; Tom Snyder
- Directed by: Loren Bouchard; Tom Snyder
- Voices of: Bill Braudis; Paula Plum; H. Jon Benjamin; Paula Poundstone; Fred Stoller
- Country of origin: United States
- Original language: English
- No. of seasons: 3
- No. of episodes: 29

Production
- Executive producers: Bonnie Burns; Tom Snyder
- Producers: Loren Bouchard; Tom Snyder
- Cinematography: Ivan Rhudick (post-production director)
- Running time: 30 minutes
- Production companies: Burns & Burns Productions; Tom Snyder Productions

Original release
- Network: ABC (Disney's One Saturday Morning)
- Release: September 13, 1997 – January 22, 2000

Science Court (retitled Squigglevision in 1998) is an educational entertainment, animation/non-traditional court show from Tom Snyder Productions, which was aired on ABC's Disney's One Saturday Morning block from 1997 to 2000. The cartoon was animated in Squigglevision.

== Development ==
Science Court utilized the limited-animation Squigglevision as its style of animation. In 1998, Science Court was renamed to Squigglevision in its second to third seasons. Tom Snyder Productions has released 12 of the episodes into a series of educational CD-ROMs with accompanying workbooks and experiment kits for schools. On December 2, 2004, Snyder, founder and former CEO of Tom Snyder Productions, was inducted into the Association of Educational Publishers Hall of Fame to honor his extraordinary contribution to educational publishing.

== Plot and characters ==
The half-hour program mixed courtroom drama, science experiments, and humor to teach fundamental concepts in elementary and middle school science such as the water cycle, work, matter, gravity, flight, and energy. As each case unfolded, the characters in the trial used humor to highlight scientific misconceptions and model good scientific practice. In a typical episode, a lawsuit or criminal action would take place based around some scientific point. Humor and musical numbers were used to break down scientific concepts.

The primary characters of Science Court were the trial lawyers Alison Krempel and Doug Savage. Alison Krempel, voiced by Paula Plum, was modest, intelligent and kind. Her logical and articulate arguments always lead to the explanations of the scientific points. Doug Savage, voiced by Bill Braudis, was ignorant, arrogant and unscrupulous.

Both Doug and Allison called on a variety of expert witnesses to prove their case. Doug, often to his detriment, called upon child academics Dr. Julie Bean and Dr. Henry Fullerghast to testify. Their scientific testimony usually disproved Doug’s case. Professor Nick Parsons, voiced by H. Jon Benjamin served as an expert for Alison Krempel. He used science to successfully refute Doug Savage's usually ludicrous and ill-informed claims while also frequently cracking off jokes, often to Krempel's and sometimes even Stone's annoyance. Often Micaela and Tim, Savage and Krempel's child assistants respectively, helped to break down scientific concepts and occasionally ask questions of the stand. Comedians Paula Poundstone and Fred Stoller rounded out the cast playing Judge Stone and court stenographer Fred respectively.

- Paula Plum as Alison Krempel
- Bill Braudis as Doug Savage
- H. Jon Benjamin as Prof. Nick Parsons
- Paula Poundstone as Judge Stone
- Fred Stoller as Stenographer Fred

== Episodes ==
=== Series overview ===
Season	Episodes	Originally released	
Season	Episodes	First released	Last released
1	13	September 13, 1997	January 17, 1998
2	8	September 12, 1998	January 16, 1999
3	8	September 11, 1999	January 22, 2000

=== Season 1 (1997–98) ===
No. overall	No. in season	Title	Original release date
1	1	"Water Cycle"	September 13, 1997
2	2	"Work and Simple Machines"	September 20, 1997
3	3	"Gravity"	September 27, 1997
4	4	"Inertia"	October 4, 1997
5	5	"Sound"	October 11, 1997
6	6	"Data & Statistics"	October 18, 1997
7	7	"Particles"	October 25, 1997
8	8	"Heat Absorption"	November 1, 1997
9	9	"Electric Current"	November 8, 1997
10	10	"Soil"	December 13, 1997
11	11	"Living Things"	December 27, 1997
12	12	"Seasons"	January 10, 1998
13	13	"Fossils"	January 17, 1998

=== Season 2 (1998–99) ===
No. overall	No. in season	Title	Original release date
14	1	"Rockets"	September 12, 1998
15	2	"Pendulums"	September 19, 1998
16	3	"Lightning"	September 26, 1998
17	4	"Friction"	October 3, 1998
18	5	"Flight"	October 10, 1998
19	6	"Planets"	October 17, 1998
20	7	"Reflection"	January 2, 1999
21	8	"Magnets"	January 16, 1999

=== Season 3 (1999–2000) ===
No. overall	No. in season	Title	Original release date
22	1	"Acid Rain"	September 11, 1999
23	2	"Barn Fire"	September 18, 1999
24	3	"Hang Time"	September 25, 1999
25	4	"Siphon"	October 2, 1999
26	5	"Rocks"	October 30, 1999
27	6	"Depth Perception"	November 6, 1999
28	7	"Compass"	January 15, 2000
29	8	"Density"	January 22, 2000

== Critical reception ==
Science Court earned top television awards for Tom Snyder.

Variety thought that the TV series tried too hard to make science entertaining, and that it would come across as too complicated for its target audience.
