= Lucy, the Daughter of the Devil =

American adult animated series

- Genre: Comedy horror Surreal humor Satire
- Created by: Loren Bouchard
- Written by: Loren Bouchard; Holly Schlesinger
- Directed by: Loren Bouchard
- Voices of: (See Characters)
- Theme music composer: Loren Bouchard (Note: Episode 1 [Pilot] only)
- Opening theme: "Lullaby for Lucy"
- Composers: Loren Bouchard; John Dylan Keith (Note: Additional music, eps. 6 & 8–11)
- Country of origin: United States
- Original language: English
- No. of episodes: 11

Production
- Executive producers: Loren Bouchard; Seth Piezas and Ralph Guggenheim (Note: Co-executive producers, episodes 2–11)
- Producers: Loren Bouchard, Seth Piezas and Josh Piezas (Note: Episode 1 [Pilot]); Andrew Hasse and Holly Schlesinger (Note: Associate producers, episode 1 [Pilot]); Jenny Head Appleton (Note: Line producer, episodes 2–11)
- Running time: 11 minutes
- Production companies: Loren Bouchard, LLC; Fluid Animation; Williams Street

Original release
- Network: Adult Swim
- Release: October 30, 2005 – November 11, 2007

Lucy, the Daughter of the Devil is an American adult animated television series that aired on Cartoon Network's late-night programming block Adult Swim. It was created and directed by Loren Bouchard and Fluid Animation. The show features Melissa Bardin Galsky as Lucy, the daughter of the Devil, who is voiced by H. Jon Benjamin. It is the first Adult Swim series to use 3D computer animation and the first to feature a female protagonist.

== Production ==
The pilot episode "He's Not the Messiah, He's a DJ" first aired on October 30, 2005. After nearly 2 years and a number of re-airings, the show was picked up for a full season, which premiered on September 9, 2007. Although the show was in 4:3, there were black bars on the top and bottom of the screen, making it seem like a show in 16:9. Sometimes, characters and shots would appear behind the black bars.

Some changes were made between the pilot and the full series. The voice of Lucy was changed from Jessi Klein to Melissa Bardin Galsky; the third Special Father character, a black man missing an eye, was discarded and replaced with the Special Sister; and the cover of "Maneater" used as opening music was replaced for rebroadcasts.

== Premise ==
The show follows the titular 21-year-old Lucy, who lives in San Francisco and has been ordained by her father, the devil, to fulfill her destiny as the Antichrist, whether she likes it or not. Along the way she meets up with a DJ named Jesús, who turns out to be the Second Coming of the messiah, and the two begin dating from the first episode after Lucy saves him from a fire created by her father to kill him.

Meanwhile, her father tries different schemes in his quest to take over the world with the help of his "advocate", Becky, who acts as something of a personal assistant. At the same time a group of "Special Clergy", two priests and a nun, are on a mission from the Vatican to find and destroy Lucy.

== Characters ==
- Lucy (voiced by Melissa Bardin Galsky) is the Antichrist, born of The Devil and an unnamed woman in exchange for a Datsun 280 ZX. An apparently normal young woman with the single exception of a small pair of devil horns, she has graduated from art school but is on no fixed career path, instead helping her father out in his ventures to conquer the world and taking a more-or-less permanent position as a bartender at his restaurant, Tequila Sally's, in the meanwhile. She is in a relationship with DJ Jesús, helps him in his different stunts, and seems to want to get him and her father close together. Lucy was voiced by Jessi Klein in the pilot.
- Jesús (voiced by Jon Glaser) is a DJ, claustrophobic escape artist, and the messiah who performs "nearacles" ("almost miracles, but not quite.") during his sets. He has a Hispanic accent.
- The Devil (voiced by H. Jon Benjamin) is the figure of pure evil, though he seems more playful and naughty than malevolent, and is willing to take over the world slowly and through schemes. Though he is certainly willing to outright kill the DJ when the possibility arises, he will also settle for lesser schemes to get him out of the way or even allow him to live if he believes he can benefit from it. He is often wearing a sweater that is a reference to Bill Cosby from The Cosby Show giving him a "Dad" look.
- Becky (voiced by Melissa Bardin Galsky) - Officially titled the Devil's Advocate, Becky serves as something of a personal assistant and manager for the Devil. Playing the level head to the Devil's flights of fancy, she is frequently annoyed at his schemes, voicing the opinion that they're rather pointless or unnecessarily involved. Her head is a fleshless skull. It is suggested in the pilot that Becky is the mother of Lucy.
- Judas (voiced by H. Jon Benjamin) is DJ Jesús' sycophantic personal assistant. He can usually be found at Jesús' side, helping him with his stunts. Among his responsibilities is wrangling the ever-present camera crew around the DJ.
- Senator Robert "Bob" Whitehead (voiced by Sam Seder) is a U.S. Senator who worships Satan, though he tries to keep it a secret from the public. The Devil has made plans for him to become President of the United States, with Lucy at his side; however, she is completely uninterested in him.
- The Special Clergy are a group of priests and a nun on a mission from the Vatican to save the world from the Antichrist. They collect rare religious artifacts and spy on characters with Satanic ties, to help them with their mission. The following are members of the Special Clergy:
  - Special Father #1: Giuseppe Cantalupi (voiced by H. Jon Benjamin) is the apparent leader of the trio. He is heard giving a monologue at the beginning of almost every episode.
  - Special Father #2: Benetti (voiced by Sam Seder) is the most quiet of the trio. He speaks with an Italian accent and is never seen without his night-vision goggles.
  - Special Sister: Mary (voiced by Eugene Mirman) - With a lazy eye and a shrill, grating voice, Sister Mary seems to be the most dedicated to the Special Clergy's mission. She is not above killing innocent bystanders, and will do so at the slightest provocation.
- Ethan (voiced by Todd Barry) is Lucy's date in episode one "He's Not the Messiah, He's a DJ".

== Episodes ==
The pilot first aired in 2005, and the series began in 2007. A unique feature of Lucy is that each episode features a different opening sequence with a new theme song.

| No. | Title | Featured theme song | Original release date | Prod. code |
|---|---|---|---|---|
| 1 | "He's Not the Messiah, He's a DJ" | "Maneater" * | October 30, 2005 | 101 |
The Devil sends Lucy on a date with a politician (Senator Whitehead), during which she meets DJ Jesús. * "Maneater" was the theme song for this episode; however, this song has been removed from subsequent airings and from the version posted on the Adult Swim website.
| 2 | "Escapeoke" | "Paint the Town Red" | September 9, 2007 | 102 |
The Devil purchases a restaurant chain, Tequila Sally's, and drafts Lucy into working there. Lucy enlists DJ Jesús to run the karaoke.
| 3 | "Dildo Factory" | "Sperm Waltz" | September 16, 2007 | 103 |
In hopes of increasing the amount of masturbation taking place on Earth and hasten the downfall of civilization, the Devil launches "Sinspirations", a sex toy manufacturing/outreach company. At the same time DJ Jesús attempts to break the world record of holding his arms out for three days and he asks Lucy to get a special order dildo created of him with his arms out that can be auctioned off on his website.
| 4 | "Temptasia" | "Holding Hands Around the World" | September 23, 2007 | 104 |
Lucy, Judas, and the Special Clergy await DJ Jesús' prophesied arrival at Burning Man. The Devil and Becky, however, try to tempt him to keep him from showing. Biblical references: The episode parodies the New Testament Temptation of Christ story.
| 5 | "Terry the Teratoma" | "Friend of the Devil" | September 30, 2007 | 105 |
After the Devil has a teratoma removed, he names it Terry and befriends it. He then begins to question their relationship when it starts taking over his job and getting romantically entangled with Becky.
| 6 | "Human Sacrifice" | "Go to Hell" | October 7, 2007 | 106 |
Senator Whitehead—Lucy's intended future husband—intends to announce his candidacy for President of the United States during a human sacrifice at the annual Bohemian Grove festival, as is the custom. The Devil gets him DJ Jesús to be the sacrificed. Meanwhile, the Special Clergy, having caught wind of the festival, decide to sneak in.
| 7 | "The Busboy" | "Meat Music" | October 14, 2007 | 107 |
To keep him out of the way, the Devil secures Senator Whitehead's son, a registered sex offender named Tad, a busboy job at Tequila Sally's. While working there he becomes obsessed with Lucy. Meanwhile, DJ Jesús experiments with foodigami—origami with food—and the Devil moves other offenders around to spell things on the online sex offender registry map.
| 8 | "The Special Fathers vs. the Vampire Altar Boys" | "Boogie Oogie Oogie" | October 21, 2007 | 108 |
Altar and choir boys in the San Francisco area have become vampires and are feasting on priests throughout San Francisco, prompting the local Archbishop to blackmail the Special Clergy into helping solve the threat. Note: Aside from the Special Clergy, none of the other regular characters appear in this episode.
| 9 | "Dreamster" | "Dreamster Theme" | October 28, 2007 | 109 |
The Devil markets a white noise machine which he uses to put people to sleep and enter their dreams with them. In their dreams he poses as a psychiatrist ("Dr. Weiner") to find out their worst fears and attempt to kill them, which would kill them in real life. Cultural references: This episode is similar in plot to, and references in dialogue, the Nightmare on Elm Street series.
| 10 | "Satan's School for Girls" | "Pound My Tom Tom" | November 4, 2007 | 110 |
DJ Jesús and his entourage rent out an abandoned Catholic girl's boarding school so he can work in quiet isolation. Strangely enough, thirty years ago the same school was the scene of a grisly crime -- and soon the past invades the present in the form of several Catholic school girl ghosts and an irritating disco song.
| 11 | "Monster" | "I Know What Boys Like" | November 11, 2007 | 111 |
Series finale. A giant monster has been terrorizing San Francisco. Senator Whitehead wants to kill it on national television to help his Presidential bid, Satan wants to capture and keep it, and DJ Jesús thinks that his power of human beatboxing can destroy it, and all three clash at the Golden Gate Bridge.

== International broadcast ==
In Canada, Lucy, the Daughter of the Devil previously aired on Teletoon's Teletoon at Night block. and aired on the Canadian version of Adult Swim. It also aired in Russia (on 2x2), Germany and Spain.

== Home release ==
In October 2010 the complete series was released on DVD, exclusive on the Adult Swim Shop, on Adultswim.com.

| DVD name | Release date | Ep # | Features |
|---|---|---|---|
| Season One | October 29, 2010 | 11 | "Making Of" interviews, a Satanic Sing-a-Long, and crew commentary on some episodes. |

In addition to being available on DVD, all episodes are available on iTunes. Madman Entertainment said on the DVD sampler that the show would be released to DVD some time in 2011 along with other Williams Street shows like Assy McGee, Delocated, and The Venture Bros. Season 4 part 1 and would be an Australia-exclusive release.

The series was available on Max until it was removed from the streaming service in December 2023.

== In other media ==
Lucy, the Daughter of the Devil would make an appearance in the Robot Chicken special, titled Robot Chicken Adult Swim Special, which was to commemorate the block's 25th anniversary. It is set to premiere on Adult Swim on August 30, 2026.
