= O'Grady =

Animated TV series

- Created by: Tom Snyder; Carl W. Adams; Holly Schlesinger
- Developed by: Holly Schlesinger; Matt Harrigan (episodes 1-3, 5)
- Starring: H. Jon Benjamin; Melissa Bardin Galsky; Patrice O'Neal; Holly Schlesinger
- Opening theme: "O'Grady (The Diary of Abigale Colletti)" by Kelly Osbourne
- Country of origin: United States
- No. of seasons: 2
- No. of episodes: 19

Production
- Executive producers: Carl W. Adams; Alyssa Cooper
- Producers: Jack Ferraiolo (season 1); Will Shepard (season 2)
- Running time: 23-24 minutes
- Production companies: Noggin LLC; Soup2Nuts

Original release
- Network: The N (Noggin)
- Release: July 30, 2004 – April 24, 2006

Related
- Dr. Katz, Professional Therapist; Home Movies; Hey Monie!

The main O'Grady characters in a scene from the episode "Sugar Hill". (L-R: Beth, Abby, Harold, and Kevin)

O'Grady is an American teen animated comedy television series created by Tom Snyder, Carl W. Adams, and Holly Schlesinger for Noggin's teen programming block, The N. The show features the voices of H. Jon Benjamin, Melissa Bardin Galsky, Patrice O'Neal, and Holly Schlesinger playing a group of four teenagers living in the town of O'Grady. In each episode, the characters experience a different supernatural phenomenon while also facing ordinary high school challenges. The show was animated at Snyder's Soup2Nuts studio.

== Plot ==
The series is set in the fictional town of O'Grady, which is periodically plagued by a force called "The Weirdness." The Weirdness affects its residents in strange ways, and its effects usually last for several days. For example, it causes people to project their private thoughts in bubbles over their heads, or produce clones of themselves every time they get angry. The focal characters of the show are four students of O'Grady High: Kevin, Abby, Harold, and Beth. In the first eight episodes, the former two would appear interviewing at Eets-A-Pizza for a cold opening, with Kevin explaining that the Weirdness was caused by a "secret government program', but sometimes would get distracted into other things. The interviews expired after "Cop 'Stache".

== Characters ==
=== Main characters ===
- Kevin Harnisch (voiced by H. Jon Benjamin) is a teenage slacker, aspiring guitar player, and self-appointed "idea guy" who enjoys pulling pranks, heists, and schemes. He likes to find ways to use the Weirdness or other school events for his own gain, such as selling sugar in school as contraband during "Sugar Hill," asking road sign figures to spy on Abby during "Sign Language," or continuing his brothers' robot babysitting company during "Robo-Babies." Kevin is the youngest of 8 brothers. Kevin and his best friend Harold started a garage band, titled Brain Fart, but often gets distracted during rehearsals rather than practicing. Brain Fart is occasionally joined by Iris as a bass player, whom Kevin continuously pays to stay in the band during "O'Grady Idol." Different episodes heavily imply that Kevin has a crush on Abby, which he will not admit; nevertheless, his true feelings are sometimes revealed by the Weirdness.
- Abby Wilde (voiced by Melissa Bardin Galsky) is an average fashion-oriented teenager. She attempts to improve her life around her by trying to "help" Beth’s employer gain business by selling non-eco or vegan friendly items in a local health food store. Abby and Kevin have feelings for each other, as shown in many episodes. Abby's longtime love interest is Pete Klesko, but she never manages to make him feel the same way.
- Harold Oscar Jenkins (voiced by Patrice O'Neal) is Kevin's best friend, A 15-year-old drummer in Kevin's garage band "Brain Fart," and a mild-mannered goofball who works at Eets-A-Pizza. He can be a little nerdy and often is uncomfortable with Kevin's various schemes. He is genuinely kindhearted and good-spirited, and he likes hanging around with Kevin because he sees the good in him. Unlike Kevin, Harold does not have a fixed love interest and has expressed interest in multiple characters, including Stacey Monique during "Cop 'Stache" and, to a much lesser extent, Abby and Beth.
- Beth Briggs (voiced by Holly Schlesinger) is a blue-haired environmental activist and vegetarian. Her interests include thrifting vintage clothing at flea markets. She is a cashier and barista at local health cafe The Enchanted Soybean. Beth has been referred to as a "hippie" by Abby. Beth's grand ideals have led to interpersonal conflicts, especially between her and Abby. Despite their differences, Abby is Beth's best friend. Beth can be considered a foil to Kevin; whereas he is impulsive and anti-authoritarian, Beth is cautious and apprehensive about breaking rules. She has good intentions but can be overly trusting of other characters. In "Robo-Babies," she reveals that her family is Buddhist.

=== Supporting characters ===
- Phillip Bertrand Demorio (voiced by H. Jon Benjamin) is one of the smartest students of O'Grady High. A member of the school debate team, he is nerdy, wealthy, and is almost always seen wearing a tie. He speaks in an aristocratic British accent. He is often bullied by other students, including Kevin. Phillip professes an interest in Abby during "Sign Language," but breaks up with her later in the episode, despite her disinterest. Phillip is shown to be arrogant and enjoys ballroom and disco dancing.
- Iris (voiced by H. Jon Benjamin) is a neurotic German exchange student and a devoted fan of techno music. She plays bass guitar in Kevin and Harold's band. She speaks with an accent, is obsessed with chocolate, and often misunderstands what others are saying to her. She sometimes speaks entire sentences in German.
- Pete Klesko (voiced by Larry Murphy) is the most popular senior male student in school. He plays on the lacrosse team, and Abby has had a crush on him for a long time, despite him being unable to remember her name. Contrary to stereotypes, he is a very kind, pleasant and fair guy, perfectly aware of his social status and everything that follows from this. At first, he may seem to be very dull in personality, but there are hints throughout the series that he's more complex than he appears.
- Donald Alan Lipschitz (voiced by Larry Murphy) is the monotone-speaking substitute teacher, usually saying "Oh, Lord" whenever something bad happens. He also seems to suffer a reverse effect to most of the Weirdness. He has to teach whenever staff become victims to the Weirdness and is often teaching every class the main characters attend.
- Dr. Myers (voiced by Bill Braudis) is the school principal. He has braces, is balding, and isn't very smart or skilled at running the school. He and Mr. Lipschitz have a somewhat unnatural friendship, both being a little annoyed of the other.

== Additional voices ==
- Alonzo Bodden
- Amy Poehler
- Bill Braudis
- Conan O'Brien
- Dannah Phirman
- David Cross
- Dina Pearlman
- Jon Glaser
- Mark Rivers
- Matt Walsh
- Paula Plum
- Rachel Dratch
- Rob Corddry
- Sam Seder
- Sirena Irwin
- Todd Barry
- Tom Kenny
- Will Arnett

== Series overview ==
Season	Episodes	Originally released	
Season	Episodes	First released	Last released
1	13	July 30, 2004	May 13, 2005
2	6	March 3, 2006	April 24, 2006

== Episodes ==
=== Season 1 (2004–05) ===
No. overall	No. in season	Title	Original release date	Prod. code
1	1	"Sweats"	July 30, 2004	101
As the Weirdness causes people who sweat to have their insecurities physically magnified, Kevin, Beth and Abby make a documentary about O'Grady and Harold worries about an upcoming wrestling match.
2	2	"Clones"	August 6, 2004	102
The Weirdness creates a clone every time a person loses their temper. Harold is jealous and lonely when he finds that he cannot create a clone for himself, while Abby and Kevin are horrified to discover that their clones are romantically interested in each other.
3	3	"Party Gong"	August 13, 2004	103
The Weirdness causes short term memory loss (signified by the bang of a gong), which Kevin exploits to convince Beth that she is having a party while her family is out of town. Meanwhile, Harold tries to track down the source of a mysterious phone number he finds himself in possession of.
4	4	"O'Grady Idol"	August 20, 2004	104
The Weirdness causes everyone to act like cats. Meanwhile, Kevin and Abby compete against each other in the O'Grady Idol singing contest, and Beth struggles to judge them impartially.
5	5	"Magnets"	September 3, 2004	105
The Weirdness causes people to act as magnets, attracting and repelling objects from themselves. Meanwhile, Beth asks Abby for help facing the future of coffee shops, and Kevin almost gets Harold fired from his job at Eets-a-Pizza.
6	6	"Sign Language"	September 10, 2004	106
The Weirdness makes public service signs come to life. Abby takes dance classes with Phillip, While Kevin uses the sign icons for his own personal gain, and Beth and Harold take Driver's Ed.
7	7	"Bubble Heads"	December 31, 2004	107
The Weirdness causes people's inner thoughts to appear in bubbles over their heads, preventing them from lying. Beth uses the Weirdness to get great deals on clothing, while Kevin and Harold's friendship is strained by the truth and Abby finally gets a chance to hang out with her crush Pete Klesko when she finds out there both going to an upcoming concert except she seems to have misplaced her ticket.
8	8	"Robo-Babies"	April 1, 2005	108
The Weirdness causes everyone who yawns to instantly teleport. The class is assigned robo-babies to care for, which exhausts Abby, while Beth avoids her 'husband' Harold and Kevin tries to spin the assignment into a scheme for cash.
9	9	"Cop 'Stache (a.k.a Mall Cop)"	April 8, 2005	109
The Weirdness makes it impossible to insult someone else, much to the chagrin of Abby's friends after she changes her look to impress Pete Klesko. Kevin becomes a mall cop, and Harold falls in with the popular crowd. Note: This is the last episode with a cold opening interview. A majority of the rest of the show would start with the theme intro in place of where the openings were.
10	10	"Sugar Hill"	April 15, 2005	110
The Weirdness creates soundtrack music to the characters' lives. O'Grady High goes without sugar. Beth and Abby find that the lack of sweets strains their friendship, while Kevin gets rich from underground sugar sales.
11	11	"Old Cold"	April 22, 2005	111
The Weirdness causes people to age 30 years when they sneeze. Kevin convinces Harold, Beth and Abby to skip to avoid their elderly classmates, but they run into a few kinks. Meanwhile Mr.Lipschitz finds he has become younger and decides to make a few more golden memories.
12	12	"No Pain, No Gain"	May 6, 2005	112
The Weirdness makes everyone invincible to pain, which Harold uses to his advantage by joining the football team to impress his dad. Also The Guru New You's, a popular makeover show, comes to O'Grady which leads to disastrous results for Beth, and Kevin tries out for the annual crazy stunt competition.
13	13	"Remotes"	May 13, 2005	113
The Weirdness causes remotes to work on people. Abby joins the cheerleading squad to get Pete's attention, and Harold and Kevin decide to open a club in Kevin's garage, while Mr. Lipschitz uses his remote to screw around with Dr. Myers.

=== Season 2 (2006) ===
No. overall	No. in season	Title	Original release date	Prod. code
14	1	"Frenched"	March 3, 2006	119
The Weirdness makes everyone float when they arere happy and turn their feet into lead if they arere mad or sad (which makes them sink). Abby and Kevin both get jobs at the public pool, Beth prepares to go to Paris and Harold has to deal with Phillip, who is working with him. This episode guest starred Conan O'Brien and Amy Poehler. Note: This episode was the last one produced before the cancellation but aired five episodes behind "Cut the Cord".
15	2	"Vacation"	March 10, 2006	114
The Weirdness makes people periodically have to urinate. Whilst Beth helps build homes for the destitute, Kevin sees an opportunity. Iris becomes obsessive in a single white female way about Abby while Harold becomes obsessed with an aged arcade game.
16	3	"A Stronger O'Grady"	March 17, 2006	115
The Weirdness gives all women super strength, leading to Beth becoming a contender in the school elections. Meanwhile, Iris uses her new strength to insert the joys of techno music into the lives of her fellow students, whether they like it or not. Also Abby starts to develop feelings toward her substitute teacher which leads to a few problems when she finds out a shocking secret about him.
17	4	"The Fly"	April 10, 2006	116
The Weirdness causes animals to be able to speak, so Harold uses a fly to learn and spread the gossip of the high school.
18	5	"Big Jerk on Campus"	April 17, 2006	117
The Weirdness causes people to become invisible when they hold their breath. One of Kevin's older brothers, Randy visits from college and Abby takes a liking to an emo boy who likes to hang out in strange places. This episode guest starred David Cross.
19	6	"Cut the Cord"	April 24, 2006	118
The Weirdness forces certain people to stay together; when they attempt to leave, a glowing cord comes out and ties them together. Abby and Harold sign up for a big brother/sister program which Abby gets a sibling of a celebrity and Harold gets a girl whose actually his own age. Beth discovers Mr. Lipschitz used to be a famous singer. Also, Kevin wins the chance to be on his favorite radio show. This episode guest starred Will Arnett and Dannah Phirman. Note: This is the final time the Weirdness is seen coming to an end onscreen.

== Critical reception ==
The series was nominated for an Annie Award for "Best Writing in an Animated Television Production". Brian Zoromski of IGN claims it as "A wonderful half-hour of absurdity, O'Grady combines the comedy of the "weirdness" with realistic teenage banter, squabbles, and friendships."

== Broadcast ==
The series originally aired on Noggin in the US as part of the channel's nighttime programming block for teenagers, The N. It aired on MTV in Latin America, Nickelodeon in the United Kingdom, Family Channel in Canada, and 2×2 in Russia.

=== Home releases ===
Although O'Grady has never been released on home video, some episodes were made available on iTunes. and Amazon Video. In 2014, a compilation called "Best of O'Grady" was released on iTunes.

== See also ==
- Dr. Katz, Professional Therapist, an adult animated sitcom, also by Tom Snyder Productions
- Home Movies, another adult animated sitcom, also by Soup2Nuts
- Hey Monie!, another adult animated sitcom, also by Soup2Nuts
- Radical 102
