= Dr. Katz, Professional Therapist =

American adult animated sitcom

- Genre: Adult animation Animated sitcom
- Created by: Jonathan Katz; Tom Snyder
- Voices of: Jonathan Katz; H. Jon Benjamin; Laura Silverman; Will LeBow; Julianne Shapiro
- Theme music composer: Tom Snyder; Shapiro Music
- Country of origin: United States
- Original language: English
- No. of seasons: 6
- No. of episodes: 81 (list of episodes)

Production
- Executive producers: Tom Snyder; Tim Braine; Nancy Geller
- Producers: Loren Bouchard; Julianne Shapiro; Jonathan Katz
- Running time: 22–24 minutes
- Production companies: HBO Downtown Productions; Popular Arts Entertainment; Tom Snyder Productions

Original release
- Network: Comedy Central
- Release: May 28, 1995 – February 13, 2002

Related
- Home Movies; O'Grady; Hey Monie!

Dr. Katz, Professional Therapist is an American adult animated sitcom created by Jonathan Katz and Tom Snyder for Comedy Central. It was the first animated show from Comedy Central, predating South Park by two years. The show originally ran from May 28, 1995, to February 13, 2002. The series starred the voice talents of Jonathan Katz, H. Jon Benjamin, and Laura Silverman. The show was produced by Popular Arts Entertainment, HBO Downtown Productions, and Tom Snyder Productions. The series won a Peabody Award for "Entertainment" in 1998.

== History ==
=== Development ===
The show was created by Burbank, California, production company Popular Arts Entertainment, and executive produced by Tim Braine and David Pritchard. It was produced and developed by Jonathan Katz and Tom Snyder, and first made by Popular Arts for HBO Downtown Productions. Boston-based Tom Snyder Productions became the hands-on production company. The episodes were usually produced by Jonathan Katz and Loren Bouchard.

The show was animated in a crude, easily recognizable style produced with Squigglevision utilizing the 2D animation software Autodesk Animator (a technique Snyder had employed in his educational animation business). In the cartoon, all people and animate objects are in color and have constantly squiggling outlines, while most other inanimate objects are static and usually shades of gray. The original challenge Popular Arts Entertainment faced was how to repurpose recorded stand-up comedy material; they decided to handle this by basing Dr. Katz's patients on stand-up comics for the first several episodes, and simply having them recite their stand-up acts. The second challenge Popular Arts faced was how to affordably animate on cable TV at the time. Tom Snyder (a boyhood friend of Tim Braine) had Squigglevision, an inexpensive means of getting animation on cable; they could not afford traditional animation processes. A partnership between Popular Arts, Tom Snyder Productions and Jonathan Katz was formed, and thus, Dr. Katz, Professional Therapist was born.

=== Show run (1995–2002) ===
The first episode of Dr. Katz aired on May 28, 1995. A total of 81 episodes were produced, with the sixth and final season (consisting of 18 episodes) beginning on June 15, 1999. Only the first six of the final season's episodes aired on Comedy Central immediately, though they did air in international markets. After a five-month delay, another nine episodes ran during a Christmas Eve marathon. No more episodes were shown after the December 24, 1999 episodes until the final three episodes of the series were broadcast one after another, in the United States, on February 13, 2002, during an event dubbed "Dr. Katz Goes to the Final Three."

A comic strip of the same name was produced by the Los Angeles Times Syndicate from January 1997 to December 1999. One book collection based on the characters and series was published, Hey, I've Got My Own Problems; writers of the book included Bill Braudis and Dave Blazek, with artwork by Dick Truxaw.

=== Post-show ===
In 2007, Comedy Central presented An Evening with Dr. Katz: Live from the Comedy Central Stage, a live-action special taped in front of a live audience at the Hudson Theater on Santa Monica Boulevard in Los Angeles, featuring Jonathan Katz reprising his role as "Dr. Katz". Comedians Maria Bamford, Kathy Griffin, Andy Kindler and Paul F. Tompkins appeared in person as celebrity "clients". Jon Benjamin and Laura Silverman also reprised their respective roles from the animated series. This special was included in the Dr. Katz, Professional Therapist "Complete Series" DVD compilation. In January 2008, live performances were presented over two nights as part of the 2008 SF Sketchfest in San Francisco, California. On the first night, Jonathan Katz's guest list included Maria Bamford, Brian Posehn and Bob Odenkirk. The surprise guest that evening was Robin Williams. At the end of the "session", Katz revealed that he had multiple sclerosis in real life.

In January 2015, the show returned to SF Sketchfest; this performance, commemorating the 20th anniversary of the program Dr. Katz, Professional Therapist, featured Jonathan Katz as "Dr. Katz", with Jon Benjamin again portraying his son, and Tom Snyder again playing his therapist. The "patients" for this production were Ron Funches, Pete Holmes, Morgan Murphy and Emo Philips. Also in 2015, live performances took place at the Moontower Comedy & Oddity Festival in Austin, Texas, on April 23 and 24, 2015. "Staged therapy" sessions included Andy Kindler, Emo Philips, Maria Bamford, Dom Irrera, Dana Gould, and Eddie Pepitone. The show was again staged in 2016, at SF Sketchfest in January 2016. The "patients" who booked "appointments" that night included Janeane Garofalo, Andy Kindler, Maria Bamford, The Sklar Brothers, and Chelsea Peretti. In 2017, as a part of the 16th Annual SF Sketchfest in San Francisco, California, there was a "live performance" on January 20, 2017. Katz did a short stand-up comedy set, with "guest patients" including Kevin Pollak, Tom Papa, Moshe Kasher and Scott Aukerman. In a natural twist, Natasha Leggero joined Moshe Kasher's session midway through for "couples therapy"; Natasha Leggero and Moshe Kasher had married one another in real life in October 2015.

=== Dr. Katz: The Audio Files and Dr. Katz: The Audiobook ===
In 2017, an audio-only version of the show, entitled Dr. Katz: The Audio Files, was produced for Audible. The first three episodes were released on Thursdays in June 2017. Dr. Katz: The Audio Files ran for a total of 15 episodes. Guests included Ray Romano, Sarah Silverman, and Ted Danson. A full-length audiobook titled Dr. Katz: The Audiobook was released as an Audible exclusive in 2018. Dr. Katz: The Audio Files released the entire comedy 'audio files' series released as an Audible Original on March 19, 2019, with a full runtime of 3 hours, 17 minutes.

== Format ==
Dr. Katz is a professional psychotherapist. He is a laid-back, well-intentioned man who enjoys playing the guitar and spending time at the bar with his friend Stanley and bartender Julie. Therapy sessions - normally two per episode, with the patients played by well-known comics and actors - anchor the show. Those that feature comics generally consist of onstage material contributed by the guest, while Dr. Katz offers insights or simply lets them talk. Therapy sessions that feature actors contain more interpersonal dialogue between Dr. Katz and his patient.

Interspersed between therapy sessions are scenes involving Dr. Katz's daily life, which includes his aimless, childish 24-year-old son Ben (Jon Benjamin), his uninterested and unhelpful secretary, Laura (Laura Silverman), and his two friends: Stanley (Will LeBow) and bartender Julie, voiced by one of the show's producers, Julianne Bond (credited as Julianne Shapiro). In later episodes, Todd (Todd Barry), a video-store clerk, becomes a regular character.

Most episodes begin with Dr. Katz and Ben at breakfast. The plots include events like Ben attempting to become a radio personality, believing he has ESP, or suffering from a moral conundrum after receiving a chain letter. The development of these plots alternates with the segments of Dr. Katz and his guests in therapy sessions. At the end of many episodes, music would play signaling the close of the episode. Katz would acknowledge this and tell his patient "Well, you know what that music means. Our time is up."

Much of the show's content, particularly dialogue between Dr. Katz and Ben, is improvised through a process called "retroscripting", in which a vague outline is developed but the actual dialogue is ad-libbed. This style, as well as the animation technique Squigglevision, would reappear in Home Movies, another series on which many members of the Dr. Katz cast and crew worked.

== Episodes ==
=== Series overview ===
Season	Episodes	Originally released		Time slot
Season	Episodes	First released	Last released	Time slot
1	6	May 28, 1995	July 2, 1995	Sundays, 10:30 pm, Thursdays, 9:30 pm
2	13	October 15, 1995	May 26, 1996	Sundays, 10:00 pm
3	13	October 6, 1996	March 9, 1997	Sundays, 10:00 pm
4	13	June 22, 1997	September 14, 1997	Sundays, 10:00 pm
5	18	June 22, 1998	November 23, 1998	Mondays, 10:00 pm
6	18	June 15, 1999	February 13, 2002	Tuesdays, 10:00 pm

=== Season 1 (1995) ===
No.	Title	Original release date	Prod. code
1	"Pot-Bellied Pigs"	May 28, 1995	101
In the first episode, Ben attempts a pot-belly pig breeding scheme and Dr. Katz receives financial advice from Stanley. Dr. Katz sees Bill Braudis and Dom Irrera.
2	"Pretzelkins"	June 4, 1995	102
Dr. Katz asks Ben to take his grandfather to the urologist while attempting to deal with his own depressed feelings. Dr. Katz sees Ray Romano and Wendy Liebman.
3	"Bully"	June 11, 1995	103
Ben deals with his childhood stuffed bull, named Bully, being accidentally thrown out, and Dr. Katz attempts to perform at an open-mic night. Dr. Katz sees Ray Romano and Joy Behar.
4	"Cholesterol"	June 18, 1995	104
Dr. Katz starts to train with Julie the bartender after having health concerns. Dr. Katz sees Dave Attell and Laura Kightlinger.
5	"Everybody's Got a Tushy"	June 25, 1995	105
Dr. Katz is worried about Ben's lack of social life. Dr. Katz sees Ray Romano and Larry Miller.
6	"Family Car"	July 2, 1995	106
Ben borrows the family car. Dr. Katz sees Anthony Clark and Andy Kindler.

=== Season 2 (1995–1996) ===
No.	Title	Original release date	Prod. code
7	"Bystander Ben"	October 15, 1995	201
Ben witnesses a crime and appears in the newspaper. Dr. Katz sees Kevin Meaney and Steven Wright.
8	"Real Estate"	October 29, 1995	202
Ben searches for an apartment. Dr. Katz sees Barry Sobel and Rita Rudner.
9	"Glasses"	November 12, 1995	203
Dr. Katz buys a pair of glasses. Dr. Katz sees Dom Irrera and Emo Philips.
10	"Office Management"	December 17, 1995	204
Dr. Katz wonders why Laura is calling out from work and thinks she needs a morale boost. Dr. Katz sees Ray Romano and Carol Leifer.
11	"Bees and SIDS"	January 14, 1996	205
Dr. Katz is afraid of a bee in the office. Ben reads his dad's medical books and convinces himself he is ill. Dr. Katz sees Dom Irrera and Louis C.K.
12	"Drinky the Drunk Guy"	January 21, 1996	206
Ben thinks his dad has a drinking problem. Dr. Katz sees Ray Romano and Janeane Garofalo.
13	"Sticky Notes"	April 7, 1996	207
Dr. Katz thinks Laura is stealing sticky notes. Dr. Katz sees Garry Shandling and Judy Tenuta.
14	"It Takes Some Getting Used To"	April 14, 1996	208
Dr. Katz sees a new woman and Ben is uncomfortable with it. Dr. Katz sees Bill Braudis and Lew Schneider.
15	"The Particle Board"	April 21, 1996	209
Dr. Katz and Ben build a shelf for the apartment. Dr. Katz sees Eddie Brill and Marc Maron.
16	"A Journey for the Betterment of People"	April 28, 1996	210
Ben meets a prostitute. Dr. Katz sees Sandra Bernhard and Todd Barry.
17	"Theory of Intelligence"	May 5, 1996	211
Dr. Katz gives an adult education lecture. Dr. Katz sees Joy Behar and Brian Kiley.
18	"Henna"	May 12, 1996	212
Dr. Katz and Ben use a hair product called "Ultra Henna Bouquet", which turns their hair bright orange-red. Dr. Katz sees Kevin Meaney and Fred Stoller.
19	"ESP"	May 26, 1996	213
Ben is convinced he has ESP. Dr. Katz sees Ray Romano and Tom Agna.

=== Season 3 (1996–1997) ===
No.	Title	Original release date	Prod. code
20	"Monte Carlo"	October 6, 1996	301
Ben starts a celebrity limousine service and runs it from his dad's office. Dr. Katz sees Richard Jeni and Winona Ryder
21	"Blind Date"	October 13, 1996	302
Julie sets Dr. Katz up on a blind date. Dr. Katz sees Jeffrey Ross and Cathy Ladman
22	"Fructose"	October 20, 1996	303
Dr. Katz brings a bowl of fruit to the office. Ben tries to find a new hobby. Dr. Katz sees Marc Maron, Emo Philips and Bob Odenkirk
23	"Earring"	October 27, 1996	304
Ben wants to change his image and thinks about getting an earring. Dr. Katz sees Jack Gallagher and Kevin Nealon
24	"Koppleman and Katz"	November 3, 1996	305
Ben discovers that his dad was a hippie and had an old flame named Sharon Koppleman. Dr. Katz sees Kathy Griffin, David Feldman and Jeff Stilson
25	"Guess Who"	January 5, 1997	306
Dr. Katz gets an urge to play the "Guess Who?" board game with Ben. Dr. Katz sees Jon Stewart and Ritch Shydner. Cameo from Harvey Roy Greenberg, MD.
26	"Day Planner"	January 12, 1997	307
Dr. Katz loses his day planner and asks Ben to help him find it. Dr. Katz sees Rodney Dangerfield, Fred Stoller and Jake Johannsen
27	"Studio Guy"	January 19, 1997	309
Dr. Katz wants to record a song that has been stuck in his head. Dr. Katz sees Joan Rivers, Bobcat Goldthwait, and Fred Stoller.
28	"Mourning Person"	January 26, 1997	308
Dr. Katz has to give a eulogy at his aunt's funeral. Dr. Katz sees Andy Kindler and Margaret Smith
29	"L'il Helper"	February 2, 1997	310
Dr. Katz throws out his back and asks Ben to help him. Dr. Katz sees Ken Rogerson, David Juskow and Lizz Winstead
30	"Big Fat Slug"	February 9, 1997	311
Dr. Katz wants Ben to cut down on his TV time. Dr. Katz sees Caroline Rhea and David Cross
31	"New Phone System"	March 2, 1997	312
Dr. Katz installs a new phone system in the office. Dr. Katz sees David Mamet and Andy Kindler
32	"Reunion"	March 9, 1997	313
Ben is invited to his high school reunion. Dr. Katz sees Dom Irrera and Lisa Kudrow

=== Season 4 (1997) ===
No.	Title	Original release date	Prod. code
33	"Ben Treats"	May 9, 1997	405
Ben wins $500 on a scratch-off lottery ticket and treats Dr. Katz and Laura to dinner. Dr. Katz sees Julia Louis-Dreyfus and Jim Gaffigan.
34	"Memoirs"	June 22, 1997	401
Ben wants to be an author and begins to write his memoirs. Dr. Katz sees Louis C.K., Ron Lynch, and Fred Stoller.
35	"Electric Bike"	June 29, 1997	402
Dr. Katz orders an electric bike. Dr. Katz sees Ray Romano and Dave Chappelle.
36	"Broadcaster Ben"	July 6, 1997	403
Ben auditions to become a broadcaster. Dr. Katz sees Bill Braudis and Dom Irrera.
37	"Trash Day"	July 13, 1997	404
Dr. Katz takes a chair that was being thrown out. Dr. Katz sees Dave Attell, Fred Stoller, and Lew Schneider.
38	"Sharon Meyers"	July 27, 1997	406
Dr. Katz meets with a former patient and love interest, Sharon Meyers. Dr. Katz sees Al Franken, Bobby Slayton and Todd Barry.
39	"Mask"	August 3, 1997	407
Dr. Katz takes a class to learn about making masks. Dr. Katz sees Steven Wright and Mark Schiff.
40	"Closets"	August 10, 1997	408
Dr. Katz asks Ben to help him reorganize his bedroom closet. Dr. Katz sees Elayne Boosler and Michael Rowe.
41	"Wild Weekend"	August 17, 1997	409
Ben wants to go camping and hiking. Dr. Katz sees Don Gavin and Robert Schimmel.
42	"Chopper"	August 24, 1997	410
Ben is a runner-up in a contest to ride in a traffic helicopter and hopes something happens to the winner. Dr. Katz sees Dom Irrera and Conan O'Brien.
43	"Alibi"	August 31, 1997	411
Ben thinks Dr. Katz is the suspect when a bald man in his late 40s damages a mailbox. Dr. Katz sees Jeff Garlin and Tony V.
44	"Ben-Centennial"	September 7, 1997	412
Ben turns 25. Laura rescues a bird. Dr. Katz sees Sam Brown and The Smothers Brothers.
45	"Undercover"	September 14, 1997	413
Ben tries to figure out why Laura is calling out from work. Dr. Katz sees Mark Pitta, Richard Lewis and Ron Lynch.

=== Season 5 (1998) ===
No.	Title	Original release date	Prod. code
46	"Old Man"	June 15, 1998	503
Ben thinks it is time for Dr. Katz to retire. Dr. Katz sees Robert Klein, Gilbert Gottfried and Jim Gaffigan
47	"Fanny Pack"	June 22, 1998	501
Dr. Katz begins wearing a fanny pack. Dr. Katz sees Denis Leary and James Leemer
48	"Metaphors"	June 29, 1998	505
Dr. Katz and Ben start drinking more coffee than usual. Dr. Katz sees Brian Regan and David Duchovny
49	"Movies"	July 6, 1998	502
Dr. Katz and Ben are addicted to movies. Dr. Katz sees Sam Brown and Patton Oswalt
50	"Ticket"	July 15, 1998	512
Dr. Katz is given a ticket for failing to stop at a stop sign. Laura dates a dentist. Dr. Katz sees Ben Stiller and Jann Karam
51	"Phone Luv"	July 20, 1998	504
Ben becomes interested in a telemarketing woman named Cindy. Dr. Katz sees Mitch Fatel and John Pinette
52	"Chain Letter"	July 27, 1998	506
Ben receives a chain letter. Dr. Katz sets up a retirement fund for Laura. Dr. Katz sees Gilbert Gottfried and Wendy Liebman
53	"Babysitting Ben"	August 3, 1998	507
Ben babysits the neighbor's four-year-old son. Laura tells Dr. Katz that the office received a death threat. Dr. Katz sees Brian Regan and Paul Kozlowski
54	"Miles Away"	August 10, 1998	508
Ben visits his cousin Sarah. Dr. Katz sees Mitch Fatel and Patton Oswalt
55	"London Broil"	August 17, 1998	509
Dr. Katz and Ben play games where they have to decipher clues. Dr. Katz sees Kevin Kataoka and Brian Kiley
56	"Feng Shui"	August 24, 1998	510
Ben is interested in Feng Shui. Dr. Katz sees Tom Kenny and Harry Shearer
57	"Alderman"	September 21, 1998	511
Dr. Katz finds out the alderman he voted for is corrupt. Dr. Katz sees Louis C.K. and Sarah Silverman
58	"Paranoia"	September 28, 1998	513
Dr. Katz and Ben think someone is trying to break into their apartment. Dr. Katz sees Lew Schneider and David Cross
59	"Waltz"	October 5, 1998	514
Dr. Katz learns how to waltz. Dr. Katz sees Ron Lynch and Susie Essman; Note: This was the first appearance of Todd the Video Store Clerk. Played by Todd Barry
60	"Anniversary"	October 12, 1998	515
Dr. Katz's anniversary approaches. Dr. Katz sees Dom Irrera and Bonnie McFarlane
61	"Community Theater"	October 19, 1998	516
Dr. Katz auditions for a play at the community theater. Dr. Katz sees Tom Kenny and Ron Lynch
62	"Ping-Pong"	October 26, 1998	517
Dr. Katz is challenged to a game of ping-pong by an old adversary. Dr. Katz sees Kathy Griffin and Laura Kightlinger
63	"Thanksgiving"	November 23, 1998	518
Dr. Katz's ex-wife Roz (Carrie Fisher) visits for Thanksgiving dinner. Dr. Katz sees Dom Irrera.

=== Season 6 (1999–2002) ===
No.	Title	Original release date	Prod. code
64	"Sissy Boy"	June 15, 1999	601
Ben is called a sissy by a former bully. Dr. Katz sees Ted Alexandro and Jeff Goldblum
65	"Pullman Square"	June 22, 1999	602
Ben stages a protest to save Pullman Square. Dr. Katz sees Ed Crasnick and Teri Garr
66	"Wisdom Teeth"	June 29, 1999	603
Ben gets his wisdom teeth removed. Dr. Katz sees Paul F. Tompkins and Margaret Cho
67	"Past Lives"	July 6, 1999	604
Dr. Katz and Ben believe they were famous people in previous lives. Dr. Katz sees Dom Irrera and Mitch Hedberg
68	"Ben's Partay"	July 13, 1999	605
Ben throws a party at the apartment. Dr. Katz sees Al Lubel and Tom Hertz
69	"Walk for Hunger"	July 20, 1999	615
Laura asks Dr. Katz to sponsor her for a walk. Dr. Katz sees Wanda Sykes and Jon Stewart
70	"Used Car"	December 24, 1999	606
Dr. Katz and Ben help Laura when she goes to buy a used car. Dr. Katz sees Greg Behrendt and Ian Bagg
71	"Ball and Chain"	December 24, 1999	607
Dr. Katz begins dating an author and Ben gets nervous about it. Dr. Katz sees Carol Leifer and Kevin Meaney
72	"Snow Day"	December 24, 1999	608
The city prepares for a blizzard. Dr. Katz sees Merrill Markoe and Dana Gould
73	"Garden"	December 24, 1999	609
Dr. Katz is interested in gardening. Dr. Katz sees Mitch Hedberg and Matt Siegel
74	"Big TV"	December 24, 1999	610
Ben panics when the TV breaks and buys a big-screen TV without Dr. Katz's permission. Dr. Katz sees Dom Irrera and Al Lubel
75	"Vow of Silence"	December 24, 1999	611
Dr. Katz makes a bet with Ben to see who can go longer without reading the newspaper (Katz) or talking (Ben). Dr. Katz sees Paul F. Tompkins and Sam Brown
76	"You're Belinda"	December 24, 1999	612
Dr. Katz wants to attend a "brief therapy" seminar in Yorba Linda, California. Dr. Katz sees Wanda Sykes and Rich Gustus
77	"Radio Katz"	December 24, 1999	614
Dr. Katz is a guest host on a radio talk show. Dr. Katz sees Dom Irrera and Julie Barr
78	"Expert Witness"	December 24, 1999	613
Dr. Katz is asked to analyze a teenager and testify in court. Dr. Katz sees Jake Johannsen and Bob Balaban
79	"Bakery Ben"	February 13, 2002	616
Ben becomes an assistant at a local bakery. Dr. Katz sees Catherine O'Hara and Dave Attell
80	"Uncle Nothing"	February 13, 2002	617
Laura gets engaged to a musician. Ben visits Dr. Katz's bar and meets Julie. Dr. Katz sees Louis C.K. and Kevin Brennan
81	"Lerapy"	February 13, 2002	618
Dr. Katz tells Conan O'Brien a joke that Conan uses on his talk show without credit. Dr. Katz sees Whoopi Goldberg and Conan O'Brien.

== Critical reception ==
The first season of Dr. Katz has a 100% approval rating on Rotten Tomatoes with 13 critical reviews; no other seasons are rated. On Metacritic, it has an overall score of 80 based on 19 reviews. The show has won 5 awards, including a Peabody Award and a Daytime Emmy. In 2015, PopMatters asserted that the show was "Still Wise and Just As Funny" as it was when it first aired. In 2016, Jonathan Katz noted "Dr. Katz has such a loyal fan base, even now."

== Home media ==
DVD name	Release date	Ep #	Additional information
Season 1	May 9, 2006	6	Bonus features include cast and crew commentary, and several animated shorts.
Season 2	November 21, 2006	13	Bonus features include cast and crew commentary, and "follow-up calls" with previous guest stars.
The Complete Series	November 20, 2007	81	Bonus features include a 28-page booklet with patients' "memories from the couch" and new drawings, as well as "An Evening with Dr Katz: Live from the Comedy Central Stage."
The Best of Dr. Katz	December 2, 2008	Various Segments	Bonus features include excerpts from other Comedy Central series and a look back at classic Ben & Laura moments.

There were also several VHS releases of series episodes.

== Books ==
- Eichler, Glenn. Dr. Katz's Me at a Glance, Pocket, 1996. ISBN 0-671-00318-6.
- Braudis, Bill. Dr. Katz: Hey I've Got My Own Problems, Pocket, 1997. ISBN 0-671-00758-0.

== See also ==
- Home Movies, another animated sitcom, also by Soup2Nuts (formerly Tom Snyder Productions)
- O'Grady, a teen animated sitcom, also by Soup2Nuts
- Hey Monie!, an adult animated sitcom, also by Soup2Nuts
