= Bill Braudis =

American writer and voice actor

Bill Braudis is a writer, voice actor, and script-writing instructor from Boston, Massachusetts who has also done stand-up comedy.

== Career ==
Braudis grew up in Dorchester, Boston, graduated from Cathedral High School in Boston and received a degree in history from Boston State College in 1979. In 1981, he took a course in comedy at the Cambridge Center for Adult Education.

He started in stand-up in 1981, doing open mics at The Comedy Connection, in Boston and the Ding Ho, in Cambridge. A little over a decade later, Braudis made his first of three appearances on The Tonight Show with Jay Leno which was soon followed up by two appearances on Late Night with Conan O'Brien.

Braudis has appeared in several Soup2Nuts programs, voicing Doug Savage in Science Court, as well as voicing "Bill" in Hey Monie! Braudis also appeared in the first episode of Dr. Katz, Professional Therapist, and played Dr. Meyers on O'Grady. Braudis wrote for these shows, along with Home Movies. He also wrote for the short-lived sitcom on the WB network, Raising Dad, made by Jonathan Katz, the same comedian who created Dr. Katz. Braudis also did a short stint on Adult Swim's Metalocalypse thanks to his friend and collaborator, Brendon Small, and writer Tommy Blacha.

Besides Braudis's extensive TV writing, he has also written a feature film that was optioned and another that finished in the quarterfinals of the Nicholl Screenwriting Competition.

== Personal life ==
Braudis married his wife, Nancy, in 1992. He lives with his wife, two children, and dogs in the Boston suburbs, and teaches TV and film writing in the Film and TV Department at Boston University.
