= Melissa Bardin Galsky =

American actress (born 1972)

- Born: January 17, 1972 (age 54); Harrison, New York, U.S.
- Other name: Melissa Galsky
- Years active: 1993-present

Melissa Bardin Galsky (born January 17, 1972) is an American voice actress, writer and producer for several animated sitcoms from the Soup2Nuts company. She was associate producer and talent coordinator for Dr. Katz, Professional Therapist. Galsky is best known for playing child actor Melissa on animated sitcom Home Movies, which was created by Brendon Small and Loren Bouchard.

She has voiced characters on two other shows animated by Soup2Nuts: O'Grady on Noggin, and Hey Monie! on BET, both also starring fellow Home Movies alumnus H. Jon Benjamin.

Galsky played the title role of "Lucy" in the Adult Swim series Lucy, the Daughter of the Devil, another series creation from Bouchard from 2007, replacing Jessi Klein from the pilot and again appearing alongside H. Jon Benjamin.

In 2011, Galsky teamed up again with Benjamin, voicing "Nora Samuels" in the seventh episode of Bob's Burgers – a show created by Bouchard – entitled "Bed & Breakfast" as well as other background characters in the show. She is now a production coordinator in New York City for that series.

== Filmography ==
=== Film and television ===
Year	Title	Role	Notes
1999–2004	Home Movies	Melissa Robbins	•Actress •Creative Consultant •Producer •Writer •Animated Series
2003	Hey Monie!	Robin	•Actress •Animated Series
2004–2006	O'Grady	Abby Wilde; Catholic School Girl #1	•Actress •Animated Series
2005–2007	Lucy: The Daughter of the Devil	Lucy; Becky, The Devil's Advocate	•Actress •Animated Series
2011–2022	Bob's Burgers	Ms. Jacobson; Julie; Various Characters	•Actress •Production Coordinator •Animated Series
