= Home Movies (TV series) =

American adult animated sitcom (1999–2004)

- Genre: Animated sitcom; Slice of life
- Created by: Brendon Small; Loren Bouchard
- Developed by: Tom Snyder
- Directed by: Loren Bouchard
- Voices of: Brendon Small; Paula Poundstone; Janine Ditullio; H. Jon Benjamin; Melissa Bardin Galsky; Sam Seder; Ron Lynch; Jonathan Katz; Loren Bouchard
- Theme music composer: Brendon Small; Loren Bouchard
- Composer: Brendon Small
- Country of origin: United States
- Original language: English
- No. of seasons: 4
- No. of episodes: 52 (list of episodes)

Production
- Executive producers: Loren Bouchard; Tom Snyder; Bonnie Burns; Mary Catherine Micka
- Producers: Loren Bouchard (season 1); Melissa Bardin Galsky (seasons 1–2); Carl W. Adams (season 3); Jack Ferraiolo (season 4)
- Running time: 22 minutes
- Production companies: Burns & Burns Productions; Soup2Nuts (Note: Credited as Tom Snyder Productions from 1999 to 2001.)

Original release
- Network: UPN
- Release: April 26 – May 24, 1999
- Network: Adult Swim
- Release: September 2, 2001 – April 4, 2004

Related
- Dr. Katz, Professional Therapist; O'Grady; Hey Monie! Bob's Burgers

Home Movies is an American animated sitcom created by Brendon Small and Loren Bouchard. The show centers on an eight-year-old aspiring filmmaker, named Brendon Small, who makes homemade film productions in his spare time with his friends Melissa Robbins and Jason Penopolis. He lives with his divorced mother Paula and his adopted baby sister Josie. He develops a skewed father-son-like relationship with his alcoholic, short-tempered soccer coach, John McGuirk.

Home Movies premiered on UPN on April 26, 1999. UPN cancelled the series after only five episodes due to low ratings, but Cartoon Network purchased the rights to the series, seeing potential in it; the show premiered as the first original program on their nighttime adult-oriented Adult Swim block on the night of the block's launch on September 2, 2001. The series ended on April 4, 2004, with a total of 52 episodes over the course of four seasons. The show was produced by Tom Snyder.

Home Movies developed a cult following during its run, and is still considered a renowned cult show, having been well-regarded by critics in the years since its run. After its conclusion, Small helped create the Adult Swim animated series Metalocalypse, while Bouchard created the animated series Bob's Burgers for the Fox network, casting H. Jon Benjamin (the voice of Coach McGuirk, Jason, Perry as well as several other supporting characters) as the voice of Bob Belcher.

== Episodes ==
Season	Episodes		Originally released		
Season	Episodes		First released	Last released	Network
1	13	5	April 26, 1999	May 24, 1999	UPN
1	13	8	September 2, 2001	October 7, 2001	Adult Swim
2	13		January 6, 2002	March 31, 2002	Adult Swim
3	13		August 4, 2002	May 25, 2003	Adult Swim
4	13		November 11, 2003	April 4, 2004	Adult Swim

== Synopsis ==
=== Season 1 ===
Animated in Squigglevision and heavily using retroscripting, the first five episodes aired on UPN in 1999. The show introduced the main characters in this season, and mainly consisted of episodes revolving around Brendon's movies. Much of the style of the writing is loose and improvised. The season ends with Brendon saying hello to his erstwhile absent father on the phone.

=== Season 2 ===
This is the first season commissioned by Cartoon Network as a result of mixed ratings of season one reruns. The episodes are now heavily scripted, but the creators now have much more freedom, allowing for creative episodes (“History”), introducing new characters (Fenton Mulley, the Adelbergs) as well as a multiple-story season arc, which includes:

- Brendon meeting his father Andrew and his fiancée Linda, resulting in therapy sessions, leading up to a wedding.
- Brendon develops a crush on Scäb choreographer Cynthia, and tries to win her over.
- Paula loses her job and searches for a new one. Melissa's dad offers some advice.

The show also develops a writing device that carries through the next seasons, in which the plots of one episode usually all have an underlying theme. Emphasis on Brendon's movies becomes key here, and the subtext of their creation is finally discussed. At this point, Brendon is still enjoying his life making films and living in a fantasy world.

=== Season 3 ===
A bit looser than season two, the show loses the idea of a seasonal story arc, and many of the episodes air out of order. The episodes become racier, with more resounding sexual themes and cursing than before. Secondary characters, such as Fenton and Duane, are given more screen time, relative to the prior seasons. Another aspect is that the show begins to acknowledge actual movies more often than it had previously, and starts parodying them heavily. The season ends with Brendon's stepmother Linda having a child, but afterwards she and Andrew no longer make appearances in the show.

=== Season 4 ===
Many of the episodes are straight parodies of movies, including three allusions to Hitchcockian thrillers. The bulk of the episodes consist of plots that involve Brendon doing something other than making films. Part of this revolves around Brendon trying to figure out whether he still enjoys making movies, or if it is becoming more of a chore. An entire episode ("Curses") dealt with swearing and adult themes. The loose dialogue and long conversations lessen for humorous plot devices and a speedier delivery at jokes and gags. The final episode ("Focus Grill") was made in mind as a series finale, and brought back the long conversations and loose dialogue, as well as a resolution to the series as Brendon, Jason and Melissa finally make a conclusion to their first film, declaring their friendship before they come to the conclusion that their movies are not meant to be consumed by an audience as they had always believed, calling into question the purpose behind them. Brendon accidentally drops his camera from a moving car while filming scenery in the final sequence and watches in distress as it gets run over, but is thereafter distracted from his grief by a discussion of fast food prompted by his mother and Coach McGuirk.

== Characters ==
Left to right: Melissa, Brendon and Jason.

- Brendon Small (voiced by and named after Brendon Small)
- Coach John McGuirk (voiced by H. Jon Benjamin)
- Melissa Robbins (voiced by Melissa Bardin Galsky)
- Jason Penopolis (voiced by H. Jon Benjamin)
- Paula Small (voiced by Paula Poundstone for episodes 1 to 5, Janine Ditullio for remainder of series)

== Style ==
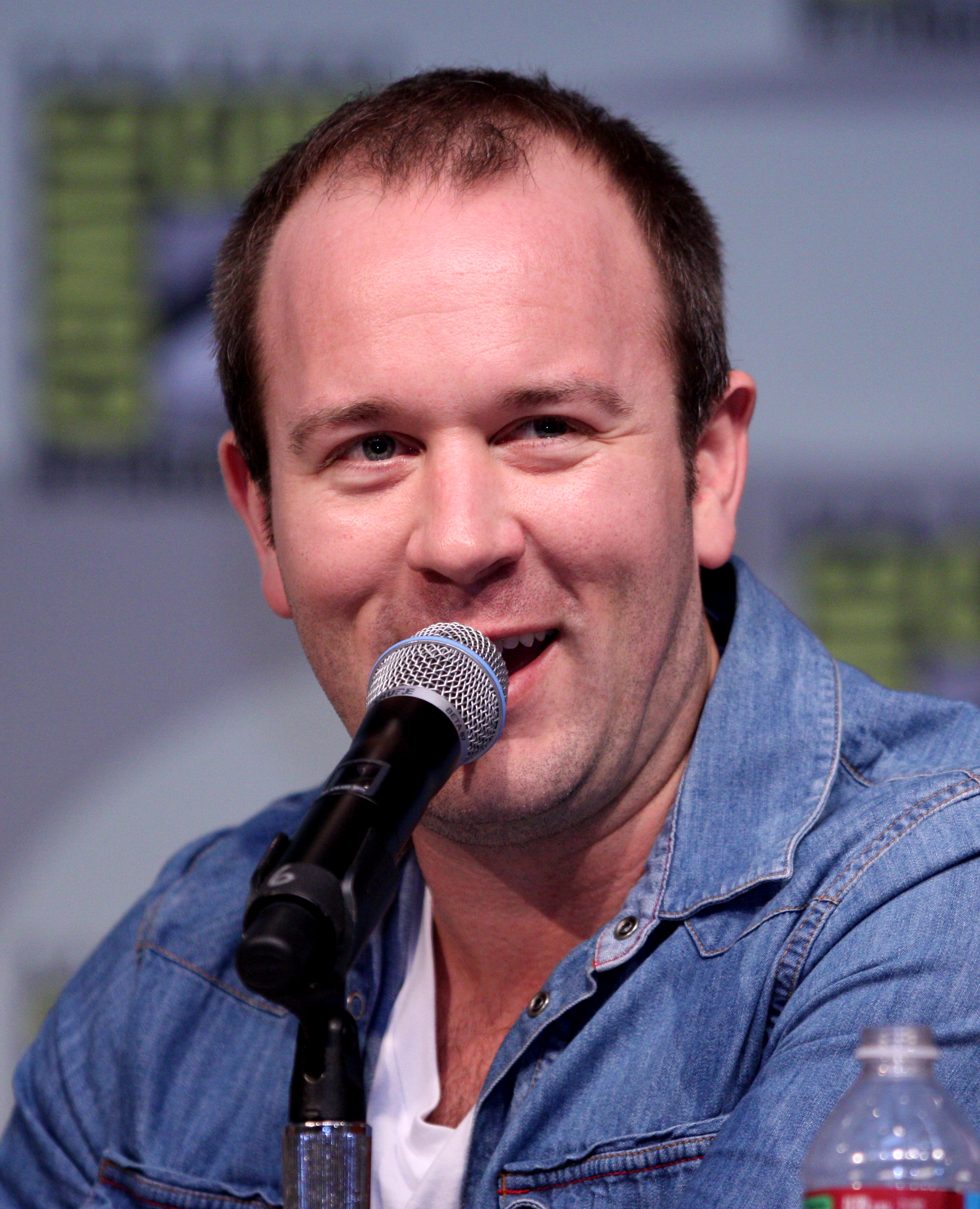
Brendon Small was a co-creator, writer, executive producer, composer and voice actor on the series

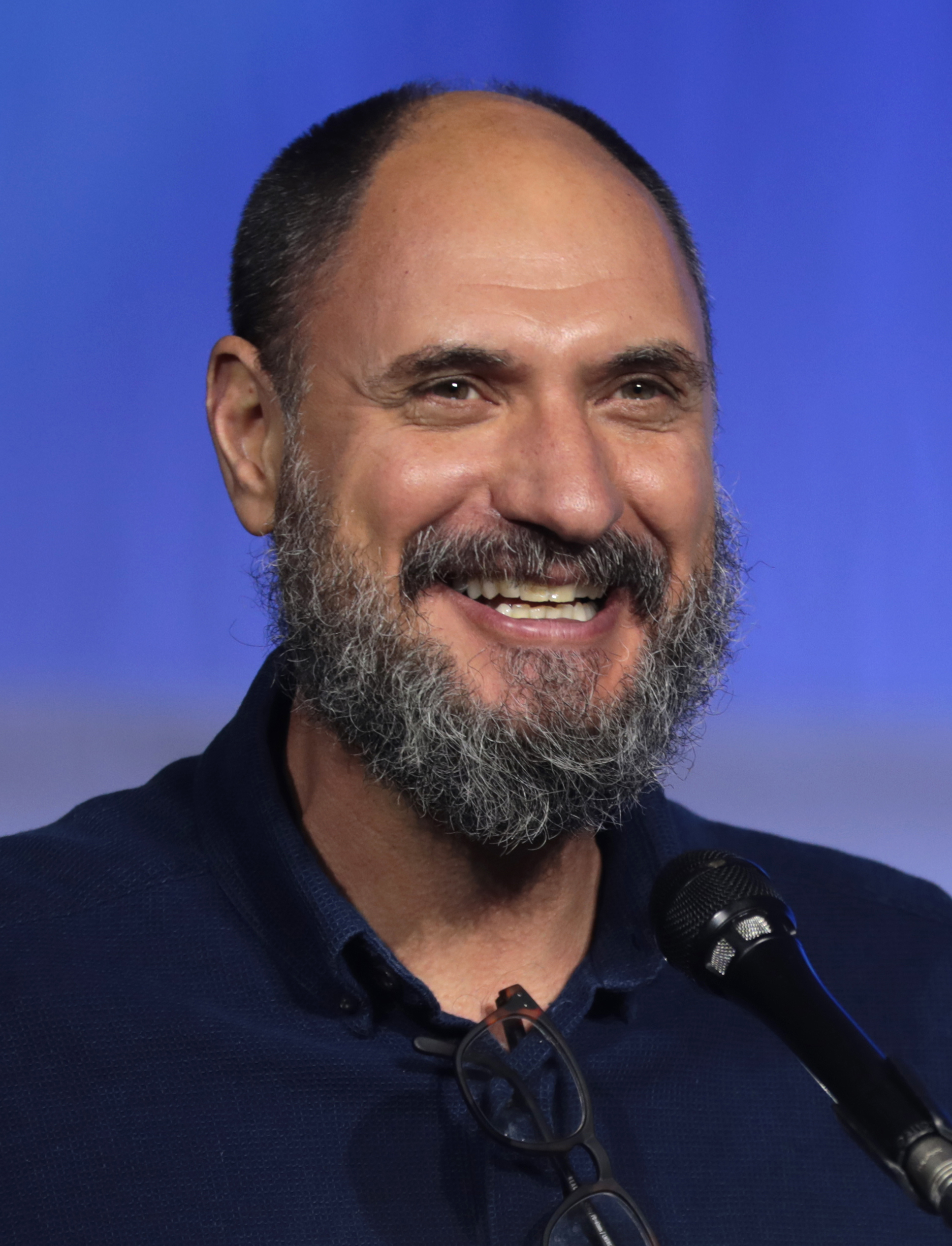
Loren Bouchard worked as co-creator, writer, executive producer, director and an occasional voice actor

In its first season, Home Movies utilized Soup2Nuts' Squigglevision animation but later abandoned that for the cheaper, more malleable Macromedia Flash animation. The switch was initiated for several reasons, including scattered negative response to Squigglevision from both critics and viewers, limitations in regard to movement (fluid motion is rare in Squigglevision), and the producers' view that since Squigglevision was inherent to Dr. Katz, Professional Therapist, Home Movies should develop its own unique style.

The dialogue of Home Movies initially relied upon spontaneous or ad-lib creation by the actors. The scripts were purposely left vague, with the plot of a particular scene merely outlined, and the dialogue improvised by the actors, with the animation then created and matched to the edited soundtrack. Bouchard referred to this process as "retroscripting," a technique he had developed on Dr. Katz. The first episode was entirely improvised. Though retroscripting was used officially in only the first season, the dialogue in the following three seasons remained heavily improvised, with the written script serving mainly as a guide to fall back on for jokes if needed.

All music for the series was written and performed by Brendon Small.

== Music ==
The soundtrack for Home Movies was released May 16, 2006; it includes 52 songs which were featured throughout the series. The CD comes packaged with the DVD release of the show's fourth season box set. All music was written by Brendon Small.

== Home releases ==
Season releases

DVD name	Release date	Ep #	Additional information
Season One	November 16, 2004	13	This three-disc boxset includes all 13 episodes from season one. Special features include 10 commentary tracks, animatics, interviews with cast and creators, animation galleries, and short films by Brendon Small and Jon Benjamin.
Season Two	May 31, 2005	13	This three-disc boxset includes all 13 episodes from season two. Special features include commentaries and interviews with Brendon Small, Melissa Galsky and executive producer Loren Bouchard, Winner of the "Small Shorts" film contest, animatics, songs from the series, Landstander, and the Decide Your Doom interactive adventure video game. It also includes a “how-to” guide to playing the Home Movies theme.
Season Three	November 15, 2005	13	This three-disc boxset includes all 13 episodes from season three. Special features include commentaries, animatics and a featurette for “People who don't necessarily like Home Movies.”
Season Four	May 16, 2006	13	This three-disc boxset includes all 13 episodes from season four. Special features include 24 commentaries, animatics, and featurettes. Also included is the Home Movies: Bonus Soundtrack CD with 52 tracks composed and performed by Small for the show.
Home Movies 10th Anniversary Set	November 4, 2008	52	This 10th Anniversary thirteen-disc boxset includes every episode of Home Movies plus new special features, as well as the CD included in the Season Four boxset.

Shout! Factory, through Sony BMG Music Entertainment, released DVDs of Home Movies seasons, each on three-disc box sets. Each DVD has numerous special features and easter eggs. Shout! Factory later on released all of the Home Movies episodes on Amazon Video on Demand. Seasons 2 through 4 are available for free streaming with a public library card on the Hoopla app and website in the United States. While Scholastic Corporation holds the rights to the series, some episodes are able to be streamed through the Adult Swim official website and app on a rotating basis. The series also joined HBO Max on May 27, 2020.

== Reception ==
The series has been highly regarded by critics upon and since its release. In 2009, IGN included it on their list of the top 100 animated series of all time. While reviewing the first season, PopMatters noted that "The animation serves one of the most impressive aspects: the fact that it was largely improvised", while Variety praised the show's dialogue and humor, saying "Home Movies manages to set itself apart, offering clever dialogue and sharp social commentary."

== See also ==
- Dr. Katz, Professional Therapist, another animated sitcom, also by Tom Snyder Productions
- O'Grady, an teen animated sitcom, also by Soup2Nuts
- Hey Monie!, an adult animated sitcom, also by Soup2Nuts
