= Loren Bouchard =

American animator and writer

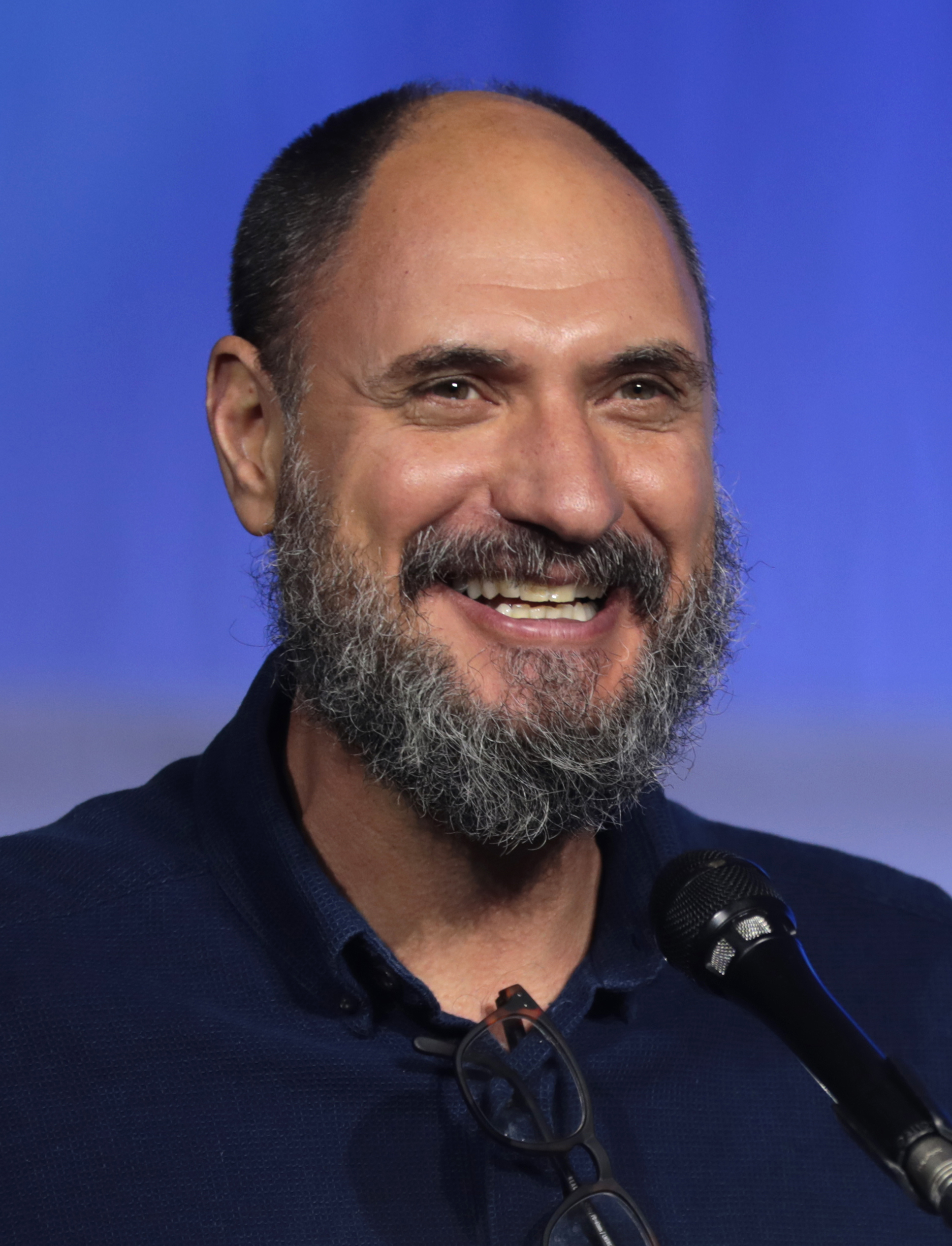
- Bouchard at the 2022 WonderCon
- Born: Loren Hal Bouchard; 1969 or 1970 (age 55–56); New York City, U.S.
- Occupations: Animator; writer; producer; director; composer
- Years active: 1995–present
- Known for: Created the American animated sitcom Bob's Burgers
- Spouse: Holly Kretschmar (m. 2006)
- Children: 2

Loren Hal Bouchard (born 1969 or 1970) is an American animator, writer, producer, director, and composer. He is the creator of several animated TV shows such as Bob's Burgers, Lucy, the Daughter of the Devil, and Central Park. He is also the co-creator of Home Movies with Brendon Small as well as the executive producer of The Great North.

== Early life ==
Bouchard was born in New York City to a Jewish mother and a Catholic father. He grew up in Medford, Massachusetts.

== Career ==
A high school dropout, Bouchard was working as a bartender in 1993 when he bumped into a former grade school teacher of his, Tom Snyder, who asked if Bouchard was still drawing and offered Bouchard a chance to work on a few animated short films Snyder was making. The shorts developed into Bouchard's first series, Dr. Katz, Professional Therapist, which he produced. He credits Jonathan Katz, H. Jon Benjamin, and Snyder as major influences. Dr. Katz ran for six seasons, from 1995 to 2000. He also produced one season of Science Court, another animated show made by Soup2Nuts.

Towards the end of Dr. Katz, Bouchard and Brendon Small teamed up to create Home Movies. The show was picked up initially by UPN, which dropped it after five episodes; the remaining eight episodes from season one, and the subsequent three seasons, were shown on Adult Swim. The show was not renewed after the conclusion of the fourth season in 2004.

After Home Movies concluded and another Bouchard pilot, Saddle Rash, was not picked up, Bouchard created Lucy, the Daughter of the Devil. The show's pilot was created on October 30, 2005, but it was not until September 2007 that the show debuted as a weekly feature on Adult Swim. He was a consulting producer on HBO's The Ricky Gervais Show.

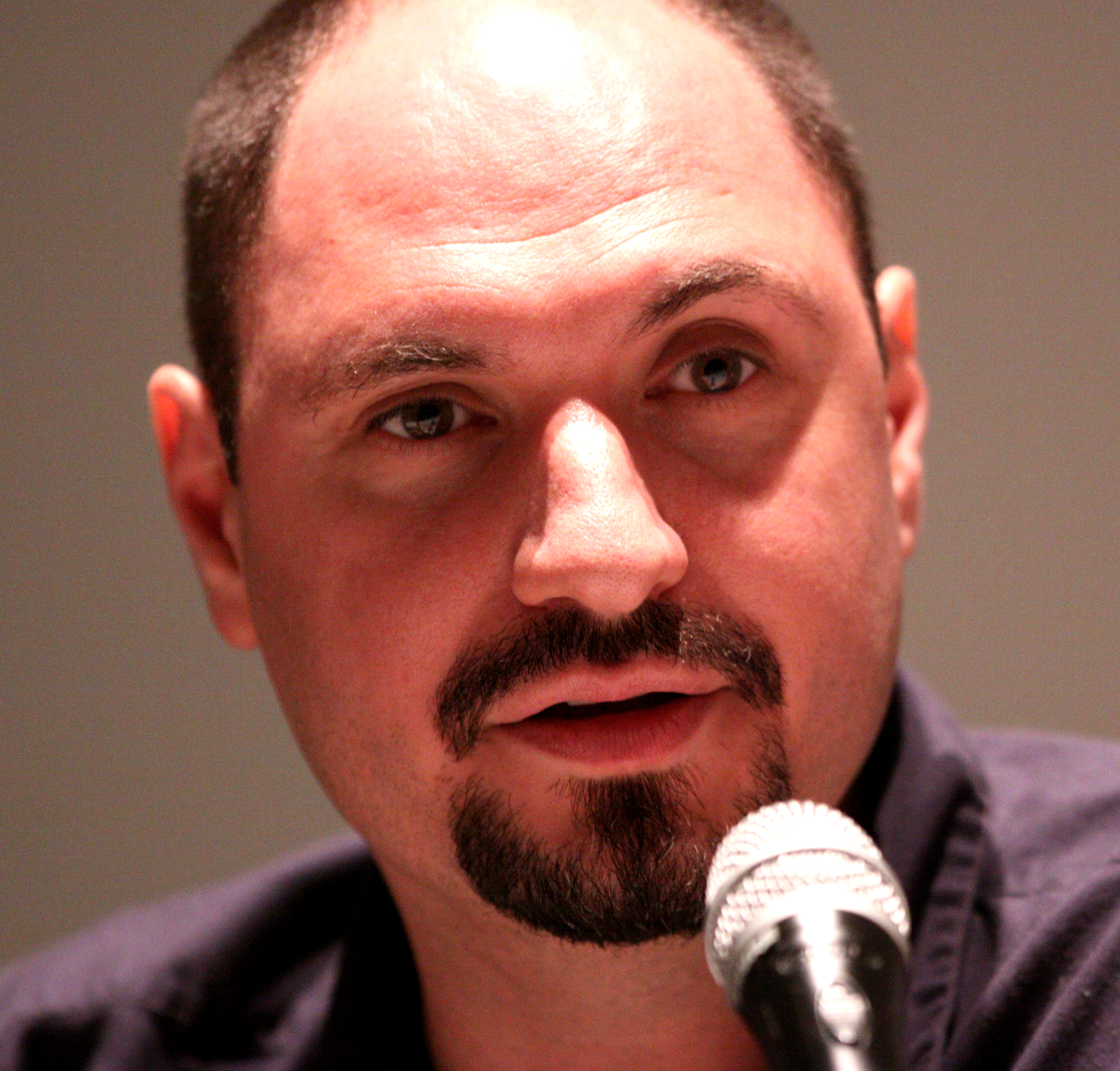
Bouchard at San Diego Comic-Con in 2010

In 2009, Bouchard got together with King of the Hill writer and producer Jim Dauterive and developed Bob's Burgers, an animated series about a family working at a hamburger restaurant. Bouchard grew up in a working-class family full of "blue-collar creatives" and created Bob's Burgers because he didn't see that kind of life represented on TV. In 2010, Fox placed the series on the primetime slate for the 2010–11 television season. A special preview aired on Thanksgiving on November 25, 2010. When the series premiered, it received mixed reviews with a Metacritic score of 54 out of 100. However, as the first season progressed and concluded and the second began, critics began giving the series praise. The show has generally been viewed as a spiritual successor to King of the Hill, which carried less emphasis on shock comedy and focused more on character-driven humor. A film adaptation based on the animated TV series was released on May 27, 2022. and serves as Bouchard's feature directorial debut.

== Personal life ==
Bouchard lives in Los Angeles with his wife, Holly Kretschmar. The couple married on September 3, 2006, and have two sons.

== Filmography ==
=== Series ===
Television work by Loren Bouchard
Year	Title	Creator / Showrunner	Involvement (episodes)	Role
1995–1999	Dr. Katz, Professional Therapist	No	Writer, producer, editor (47 episodes)	—
1997	Science Court	No	Producer and director (12 episodes)	—
2001–2004	Home Movies	Yes (52 episodes)	Writer, executive producer, director, co-theme music composer	Josie Small (voice)
2005–2007	Lucy, the Daughter of the Devil	Yes (11 episodes)	Writer, executive producer, director, composer	Classmate (voice)
2007	My Gym Partner's a Monkey	No	Voice actor (episode: "Flesh Fur Fantasy/Substitute Sweetheart")	Teddy (voice)
2010	The Ricky Gervais Show	No	Consulting producer (season 1)	—
2011–present	Bob's Burgers	Yes	Writer, co-developer, executive producer, main theme composer	Mickey (voice) (episode "Beach, Please", replaced Bill Hader)
2020–2022	Central Park	Yes	Writer, executive producer, main theme composer	—
2021–2025	The Great North	No	Executive producer	—

=== Films ===
Film work by Loren Bouchard
Year	Title	Director	Involvement	Role
2022	My Butt Has a Fever	Yes	Short film, writer, music and lyrics, performer	—
2022	The Bob's Burgers Movie	Yes	Writer, producer, music and lyrics, additional score arrangements, additional music, musician, vocalist, song producer	Additional voices

== Awards and honors ==
Accolades for Loren Bouchard
Year	Award	Category	Work	Result
1995	CableACE Award	Animated Programming Special or Series	Dr. Katz, Professional Therapist	Won
1995	CableACE Award	Writing a Comedy Series	Dr. Katz, Professional Therapist	Nominated
1998	TCA Award	Outstanding Achievement in Children's Programming	Science Court	Nominated
2011	Teen Choice Award	Choice Animated Series	Bob's Burgers	Nominated
2012	Critics' Choice Television Award	Best Animated Series	Bob's Burgers	Nominated
2012	Teen Choice Award	Choice Animated Series	Bob's Burgers	Nominated
2012	Primetime Emmy Award	Outstanding Animated Program	Bob's Burgers for "Burgerboss"	Nominated
2013	Annie Award	Best General Audience Animated TV/Broadcast Production	Bob's Burgers for "Ear-sy Rider"	Nominated
2013	Teen Choice Award	Choice Animated Series	Bob's Burgers	Nominated
2013	Primetime Emmy Award	Outstanding Animated Program	Bob's Burgers for "O.T.: The Outside Toilet"	Nominated
2014	Annie Award	Best General Audience Animated TV/Broadcast Production	Bob's Burgers	Nominated
2014	Critics' Choice Television Award	Best Animated Series	Bob's Burgers	Nominated
2014	Primetime Emmy Award	Outstanding Animated Program	Bob's Burgers for "Mazel-Tina"	Won
2015	People's Choice Award	Favorite Animated TV Show	Bob's Burgers	Nominated
2015	Annie Award	Best General Audience Animated TV/Broadcast Production	Bob's Burgers	Nominated
2015	Critics' Choice Television Award	Best Animated Series	Bob's Burgers	Nominated
2015	Primetime Emmy Award	Outstanding Animated Program	Bob's Burgers for "Can't Buy Me Math"	Nominated
2015	Environmental Media Award	Television Episodic Comedy	Bob's Burgers for "Late Afternoon in the Garden of Bob and Louise"	Nominated
2016	People's Choice Award	Favorite Animated TV Show	Bob's Burgers	Nominated
2016	Critics' Choice Television Award	Best Animated Series	Bob's Burgers	Nominated
2016	Critics' Choice Television Award	Best Animated Series	Bob's Burgers	Nominated
2016	Annie Award	Best General Audience Animated TV/Broadcast Production	Bob's Burgers	Nominated
2016	Primetime Emmy Award	Outstanding Animated Program	Bob's Burgers for "The Horse Rider-er"	Nominated
2017	People's Choice Award	Favorite Animated TV Show	Bob's Burgers	Nominated
2017	Annie Award	Best General Audience Animated TV/Broadcast Production	Bob's Burgers for "Glued, Where's My Bob?"	Won
2017	Annie Award	Outstanding Achievement, Music in an Animated TV/Broadcast Production	Bob's Burgers for "Glued, Where's My Bob?" (shared with John Dylan Keith)	Nominated
2017	Teen Choice Award	Choice Animated TV Show	Bob's Burgers	Nominated
2017	Primetime Emmy Award	Outstanding Animated Program	Bob's Burgers for "Bob Actually"	Won
2018	Critics' Choice Television Award	Best Animated Series	Bob's Burgers	Nominated
2018	Teen Choice Award	Choice Animated TV Show	Bob's Burgers	Nominated
2018	Primetime Emmy Award	Outstanding Animated Program	Bob's Burgers for "V for Valentine-detta"	Nominated
2019	Annie Award	Best General Audience Animated TV/Broadcast Production	Bob's Burgers for "The Bleakening: Parts 1 & 2"	Nominated
2019	Critics' Choice Television Award	Best Animated Series	Bob's Burgers	Nominated
2019	Primetime Emmy Award	Outstanding Animated Program	Bob's Burgers for "Just One of the Boyz 4 Now for Now"	Nominated
2020	Primetime Emmy Award	Outstanding Animated Program	Bob's Burgers for "Pig Trouble in Little Tina"	Nominated
2021	Dorian TV Awards	Best Animated Show	Bob's Burgers	Nominated
2021	Hollywood Critics Association TV Awards	Best Animated Series or Animated Television Movie	Bob's Burgers	Nominated
2021	Primetime Emmy Award	Outstanding Animated Program	Bob's Burgers for "Worms of In-Rear-Ment"	Nominated
2022	Peabody Award	Entertainment	Bob's Burgers	Nominated
