= Snooper Troops =

1982 video games

- Genre: Adventure/educational
- Developer: Computer Learning Connection
- Publisher: Spinnaker Software
- Platforms: Apple II, Atari 8-bit, Commodore 64, MS-DOS

Snooper Troops is a series of two 1982 adventure/educational video games developed by Computer Learning Connection and published by Spinnaker Software. They were created by Tom Snyder and released for the Apple II, Atari 8-bit computers, Commodore 64, and MS-DOS. The first case was entitled Snooper Troops: Case #1: The Granite Point Ghost and the second case entitled Snooper Troops: Case #2 - The Case of the Disappearing Dolphin was released later that year.

== Plot ==
In the first case, players have to solve the mystery of "The Granite Point Ghost", which has been scaring the Kim family out of their house.

== Gameplay ==
In this "mystery simulation", players use the SnoopNet computer to search for clues along the streets, and search in people's houses while they're not at home. If you are caught snooping too many times, the game is over. After gaining enough information, they can convict the criminal.

InfoWorld described the game as an electronic version of the board game Clue.

== Development ==
Snooper Troops was developed by Computer Learning Connection (later renamed Tom Snyder Productions) and programmed by Tom Snyder. Around this time, Computer Learning Connection created the edutainment classics Snooper Troops and Agent USA, The Search Series and The Other Side. The game is based on the best-selling Snooper Troops detective stories by Tom Snyder. The series was originally meant to have more than two entries, but only two games were made.

The game was written for the home market, and targeted schools due to the application of school-taught skills such as case-solving. It intended to develop vocabulary and reasoning skills. Snooper Troops was marketed nationally on a major scale by Spinnaker Software; the campaign involved the design and production of packaging intended to maximise the protection of the discs over a long time period. In 1985, Gessler Education Software published The Case of the Disappearing Dolphin in French (on the Apple II), and The Granite Point Ghost in Spanish and German on the Commodore 64.

== Reception ==
According to the book Beyond Edutainment, the game became "one of the first examples of a successful educational adventure", and that along with Where in the World is Carmen Sandiego and The Oregon Trail helped bring legitimacy to the edutainment genre. The book Disney Stories explained that it is an "early adventure game". Learning How To Learn: Technology, the Seven Multiple Intelligences and Learning asserted the title was an example of "the ways in which computers can enhance student learning". InfoWorld felt that some bugs let down the gaming experience, but InfoWorld's Essential Guide to Atari Computers recommended the game as among the best adventures for the Atari 8-bit. PC Magazine felt the title was the standard that other educational games would be measured up against. Antic felt the game was not as responsive or creative as Infocom's Deadline (1982).

The two games became the first educational games for home and school computers to make the industry's bestseller list. According to Infoworld, the title sold very well.
