= The Dick & Paula Celebrity Special =

- Genre: Television comedy
- Created by: Tom Snyder
- Voices of: Paula Plum; Richard Snee; Jonathan Katz; Andy Kindler; H. Jon Benjamin; Tom Leopold
- Country of origin: United States
- Original language: English
- No. of seasons: 1
- No. of episodes: 13 (6 aired)

Production
- Running time: 30 minutes
- Production company: Tom Snyder Productions

Original release
- Network: FX
- Release: July 20 – August 24, 1999

The Dick and Paula Celebrity Special is an adult animated series that aired on FX in 1999. The premise of the show was that Dick and Paula hosted a talk show where famous individuals, usually deceased, talked about their work or what made them widely known. The guest list included Charles Darwin, Marquis de Sade, Oedipus Rex, and Lewis and Clark, among many others. Accompanying the two hosts was a Paul Shaffer-esque keyboard player. This premise bears similarities with that of Steve Allen's Meeting of Minds.

The series, like Dr. Katz, Professional Therapist, the first season of Home Movies, and Science Court, was animated in Squigglevision, a computer animation technique that caused the edges of people and important objects to vibrate constantly. Also like those series, Dick and Paula utilized retroscripting, in which a basic outline is given and the actors improvise the dialogue. Later, the dialogue is edited to a coherent script.

Dick was voiced by Richard Snee, and Paula by Paula Plum. The cast also included Home Movies and Dr. Katz stars H. Jon Benjamin and Jonathan Katz.

Thirteen episodes were ordered by FX, but only six aired in July and August 1999.

In January 2000, Animation World News announced that the other seven episodes would air in March, including these highlights: "The first sighting of The Blair Witch as she discusses her 10K Run for Testicular Cancer Awareness; Joan of Arc talks about hearing voices and what she looks for in a man; Roman emperor Nero reminisces about his wild days of partying and discusses his current job as a greeter at Caesars Palace; Satan explains his side of the falling out with God and tries to possess someone in the audience; and ventriloquist Jim Stank argues with his wife, Rochelle, a ventriloquist dummy." However, the show did not return in March; the final seven episodes remained unaired.

== Episodes ==
No.	Title	Directed by	Written by	Original release date	US viewers (millions)
1	"Switching Problems"	Tom Snyder, Carl W. Adams	Tom Snyder, H. Jon Benjamin	July 20, 1999	N/A
Dick and Paula's guests are Paul Revere and Oedipus Rex, who is marketing a new fragrance named Complex.
2	"Endorsement"	Tom Snyder	Tom Snyder, H. Jon Benjamin	July 27, 1999	N/A
3	"No Contest"	Tom Snyder	Tom Snyder, H. Jon Benjamin	August 3, 1999	N/A
Charles Darwin discusses his theory of evolution; Eugene Alton Fisk, acting coach for the Menendez brothers.
4	"Sexy Dick"	Tom Snyder, Carl W. Adams	Tom Snyder, Carl W. Adams, H. Jon Benjamin	August 10, 1999	N/A
Joseph Guillotine talks about his lethal invention and shows off execution bloopers; blacklisted TV personality Banjo Billy.
5	"Neighbors"	Tom Snyder	Tom Snyder, H. Jon Benjamin	August 17, 1999	N/A
Explorers Meriweather Lewis and William Clark reconcile their differences; a Hollywood report.
6	"Vicki's Date"	Tom Snyder, Carl W. Adams	Tom Snyder, Carl W. Adams, H. Jon Benjamin	August 24, 1999	N/A
Mountain climber/explorer George Mallory and professional stalker Gavin Douche.
7	"Letterman"	N/A	N/A	Unaired	N/A
8	"Heat Wave"	N/A	N/A	Unaired	N/A
9	"Escape!"	N/A	N/A	Unaired	N/A
10	"Little Guys"	N/A	N/A	Unaired	N/A
11	"Downsizing"	N/A	N/A	Unaired	N/A
12	"Contest Winner"	N/A	N/A	Unaired	N/A
