= Decisions, Decisions =

Educational role-playing video game series

- Genres: Educational, simulation, role-playing
- Developer: Tom Snyder Productions

Decisions, Decisions is a 15-part educational role-playing video game series by Tom Snyder Productions, released from the 1980s to the early 2000s. It has also been described as a "media-assisted Simulation Game" series.

== Gameplay ==
Each game puts the players (recommended to be a classroom) into a scenario based on actual facts and encourages them to come up with solutions.

An example is in the title Decisions, Decisions: Prejudice, in which the players take the role of the mayor of a tourist town, in which a newspaper has editorialised against a business trading racial memorabilia. Students discuss the problem in teams, then enter their strategies into the computer, which advances the story, leading to 300 alternate paths. Members of the team receive booklets from the perspective of an adviser to the decision maker, for instance in Decisions, Decisions: The Environment, they could be a campaign manager, and environmentalist, a scientist, and an economist; players then debate this conflicting information to reach a justifiable compromise.

The games encourage a five step critical thinking process:

1. Analyze the situation
2. Determine and prioritise goals
3. Consider their options
4. Make a decision
5. Examine the consequences

Follow-up activities include: taking quizzes, drawing political cartoons, writing to state and federal legislators, seeing how others parts of the country voted on the issue, and research Web links.

== Development ==
While Tom Snyder originally created games that would suit the "one-computer classroom" model, this series was part of a new gaming focus of "choice-driven discussion generators". The software was designed specifically to foster academic discussions within the classroom. An online learning extension named Decisions, Decisions Online was also created. David Dockterman, VP and Chief Academic Officer of Tom Snyder Productions, commented "the series grew out of my frustration teaching high school history during the Iranian hostage crisis. I thought it would be valuable for my students to discuss what was happening in the world."

In 1999 a free service Decisions Decisions Online was released, which allowed students to discuss events taken from current headlines, with a new topic featured every month. Hedrick Ellis, executive producer of Decisions, Decisions Online, was reluctant to introduce advertising, and instead noted that Tom Snyder Productions would eventually charge for the products.

In 2002 Tom Snyder Productions was bought by Scholastic, and this series fell under Scholastic's Interactive Educational Software division.

Realwordedtech suggested the series died out because it "was expensive to create and even more difficult for teachers to integrate an increasingly prescribed data-driven curriculum".

== Titles (incomplete) ==
- Decisions, Decisions: Current Issues
- Decisions, Decisions: AIDS
- Decisions, Decisions: Colonization
- Decisions, Decisions: Immigration
- Decisions, Decisions: On the Campaign Trail
- Decisions, Decisions: Prejudice
- Decisions, Decisions: Revolutionary Wars
- Decisions, Decisions: Substance Abuse (also known as S.M.A.R.T. Choices)
- Decisions, Decisions: The Budget Process
- Decisions, Decisions: The Constitution
- Decisions, Decisions: The Environment
- Decisions, Decisions: Urbanization
- Decisions, Decisions: Violence in the Media
- Decisions, Decisions: Ancient Empires
- Decisions, Decisions: Drinking and Driving

== Reception ==
Education World gave Decisions, Decisions Online an A+, describing it as an effective online resource to stimulate the critical thinking skills of young people.

Laura Cirillo-Boilard of USJ gave Decisions, Decisions – The Constitution 10/10, praising its ability to develop skills in cooperative learning, reading comprehension, oral communication, problem-solving, and decision-making. Teaching TV Production in a Digital World: Integrating Media Literacy recommended the use of Decisions, Decisions: Violence in the Media within the school curriculum. Character Education in America's Blue Ribbon Schools felt the series effectively allowed students to work together in solving real world problems and analysing the results of their decisions. Multimedia Schools said Decisions, Decisions Online is an "interesting, informative, and affordable" product.

The website was The New York Times' featured site on January 5, 2000. The Washington Post reported that the series could be ground-breaking in the move from learning distinct subjects to a synergistic approach, using all these skills to complete practical and realistic projects. Macworld noted that Decisions, Decisions 5.0: The Constitution was not a replacement for a U.S. history textbook. Teacher Librarian praised it as one of the best ethics-based simulations on the market. Shirley Neill, co-editor of Only the Best, noted “Snyder tries to get kids to see the issue from a lot of different points of view". From Now On deemed it the leading producer of historical simulations. While Kliatt praised the series for addressing current issues, it noted the games were not "culturally balanced". Tech & Learning wrote "These thought-provoking programs enriched learning in countless ways." MacWorld suggests the series challenges the student view that historical events are "far-removed from their own lives and have little relevance to the present".

=== Awards ===
- 1988 SIIA CODiE Award for Best Middle or Secondary School Program – Decisions, Decisions Series
- 1997 Codie award for excellence in technology
- 1998 Excellence in Software Award for Best Curriculum Software for Middle School – Decisions, Decisions: Ancient Empires
- 1998 Excellence in Software Award for Best Education Software Upgrade – Decisions, Decisions: The Environment
- 1999 Education World – Best of 1999 – Decisions, Decisions Online
- 2001 Codie Award Finalist: Best School Based Secondary Education Software – Decisions, Decisions Online
