= FixMeStick =

Computer virus removal product

The FixMeStick
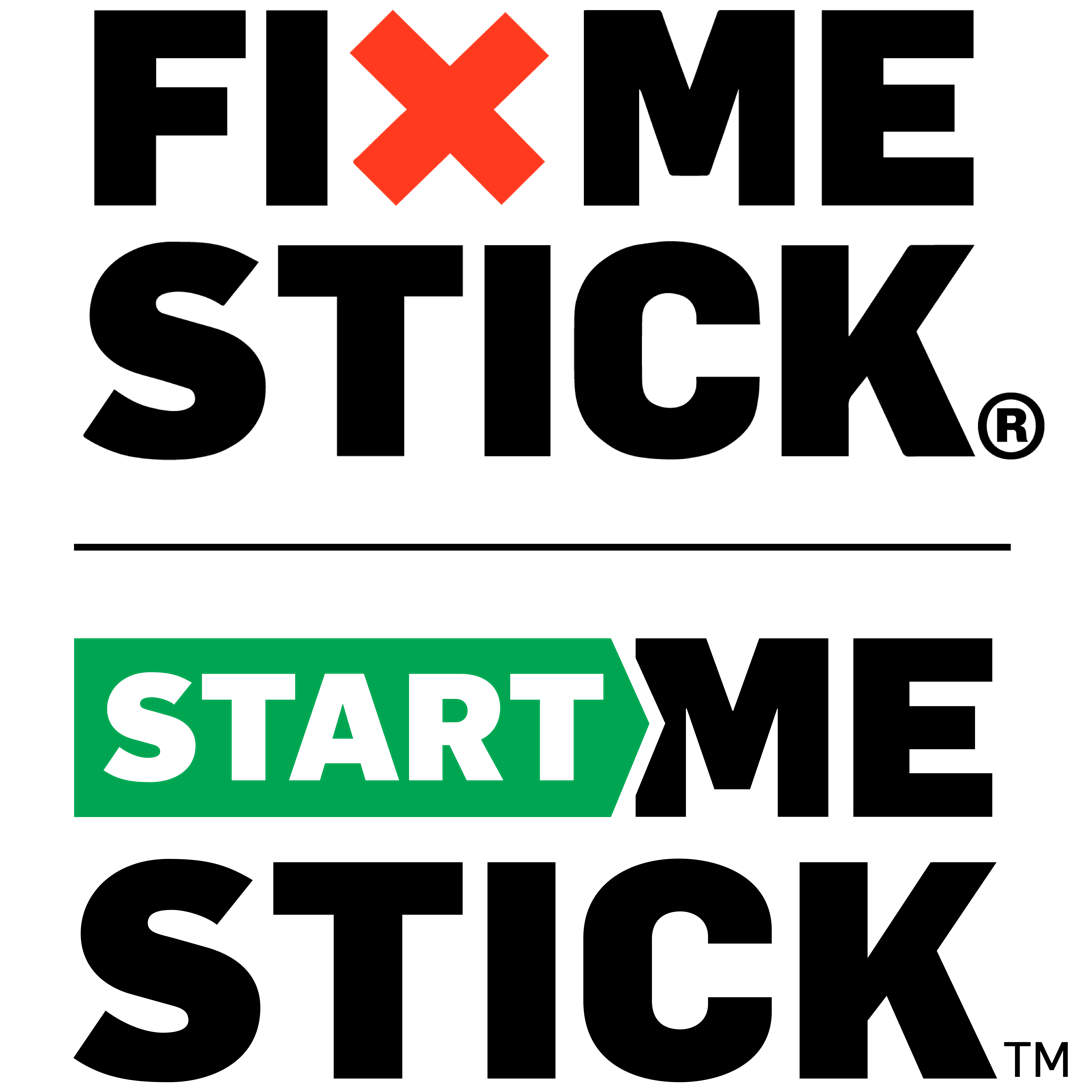
- Developer: FixMeStick Technologies
- Release: May 9, 2012
- Platform: macOS, Microsoft Windows
- Available in: English, French, Dutch, German
- Website: www.fixmestick.com

FixMeStick Technologies Inc founded in 2011, is a Canadian company headquartered in Montreal, Quebec. The company sells a computer virus-removal device, FixMeStick; and StartMeStick, a device that temporarily replaces a computer's operating system.

On January 15, 2014, the founders of the company (Corey Velan and Marty Alguire) appeared on CBC Television's Dragons' Den, a reality show in which entrepreneurs pitch their businesses to venture capitalists. They asked for a CAD$500,000 investment in exchange for a 20% share.

On November 26, 2020, the founders of the company appeared again on Dragons' Den to pitch the StartMeStick. They asked for a CAD$1,000,000 investment in exchange for a 20% share.

== FixMeStick ==
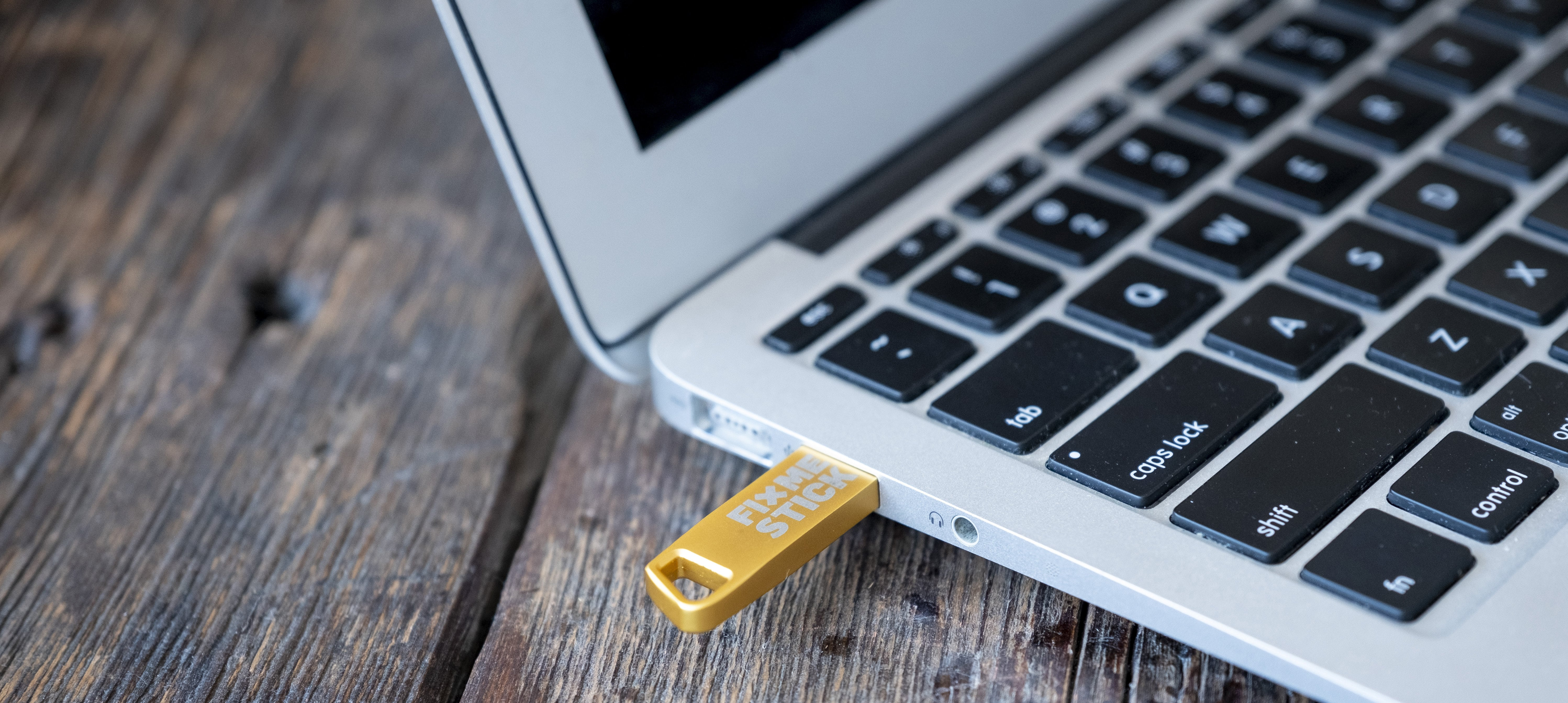
The FixMeStick (PC version) plugged into a laptop

The FixMeStick is an external computer virus-removal USB device. It was released for sale on May 9, 2012. It is currently sold internationally both online and via various retailers.

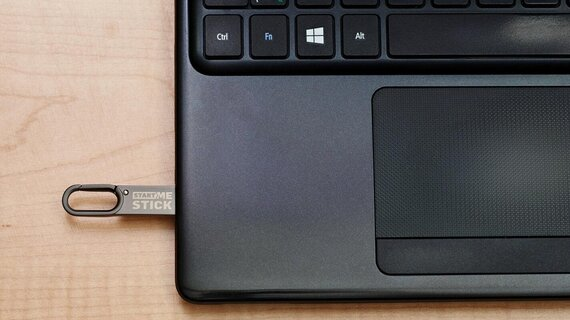
The StartMeStick plugged into a laptop.

== StartMeStick ==
The StartMeStick is an external computer operating system on a USB device. It was released for sale in November 2019. It is currently sold internationally both online and via various retailers.

== Reception ==
The FixMeStick has a four out of five star rating and has an editor's rating of "excellent" on PC Magazine.
