= Front & York =

Residential complex in Brooklyn, New York

Coordinates: 40°42′7″N 73°59′9″W

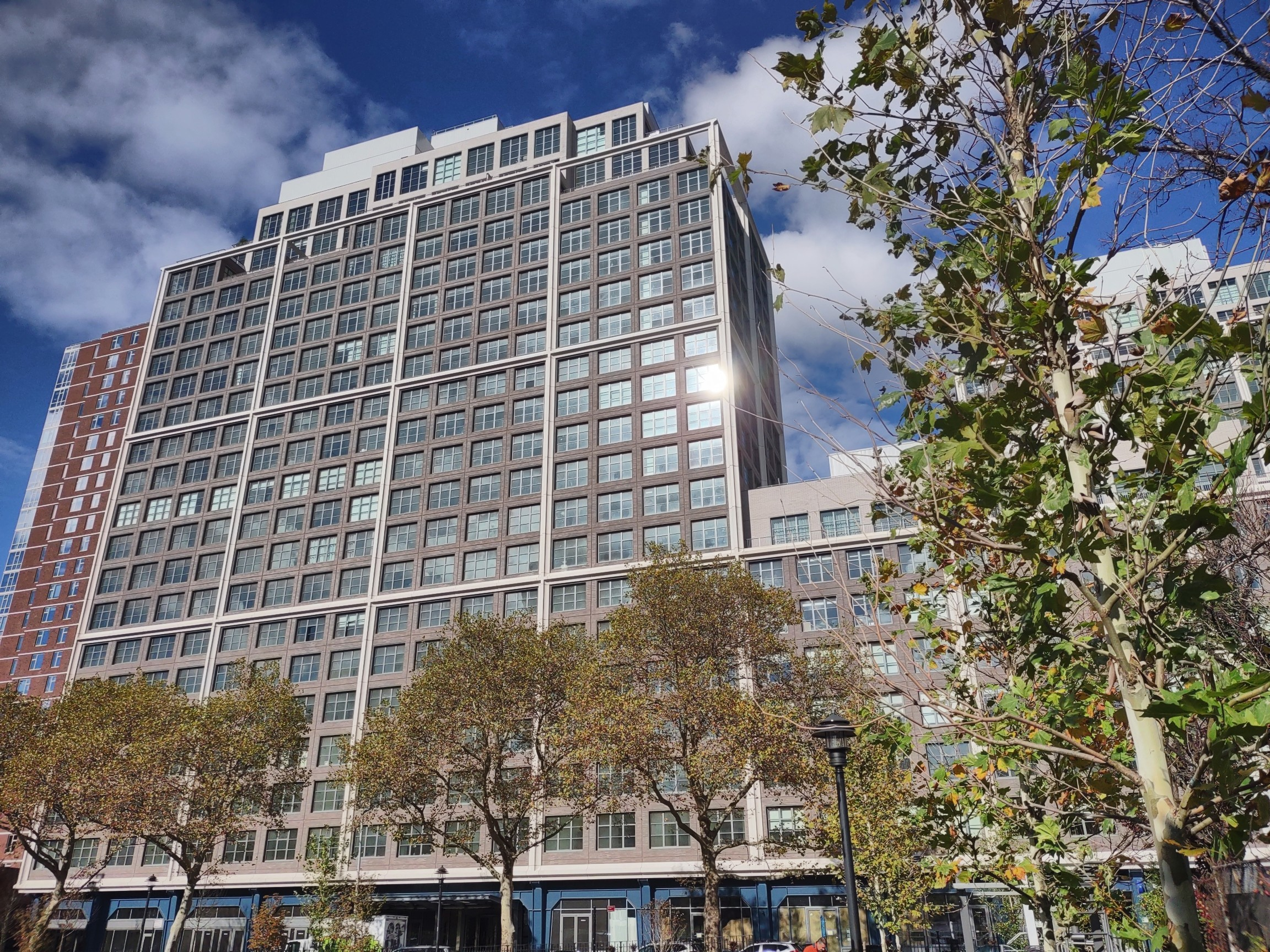
- Interactive map of the Front & York area

General information
- Classification: Residential
- Location: 85 Jay Street, Dumbo, Brooklyn, New York
- Completed: 2021

Technical details
- Floor count: 21

Design and construction
- Architect: Morris Adjmi
- Developer: CIM Group; LIVWRK

Front & York is a full-block residential building at 85 Jay Street in the Dumbo neighborhood of Brooklyn in New York City. CIM Group and LIVWRK developed the building, and Morris Adjmi Architects designed it.

== History and development ==
CIM Group, Kushner Companies, and LIVWRK purchased the site in December 2016 for $345 million. The site was one of several in Brooklyn purchased from Jehovah's Witnesses by Kushner Companies and a set of partner companies. When purchased, the parcel was being used as a parking lot. At the time of the transaction, CIM had a 95% stake in the project, with LIVWRK and Kushner owning a combined 5%.

CIM Group purchased Kushner Companies' stake in 2018. JPMorgan provided the developers a $131.2 million construction loan in May 2020. The building topped out in July 2020, and window installation had begun as of October.

=== Design ===
Morris Adjmi Architects, the firm that designed Front & York, is known for re-purposing existing buildings, especially industrial structures, and for producing designs that draw inspiration from pre-existing, local architectural context.

== Usage and impact ==
The building is residential. Upon completion, the building will contain 320 rental apartments and 408 condominiums. The building will be the largest in Dumbo when completed. Norman Oder, writing for The Bridge, speculated that it could increase the neighborhood's population by as much as 25%. The increase in population is expected to impact the York Street station of the New York City Subway.

The building has several retail tenants, including a restaurant, a veterinary practice, and a daycare.

Condominium owners and renters will have access to a pool, a parking lot, and a private park. Michael Van Valkenburgh Associates designed the park. The organization also designed nearby Brooklyn Bridge Park.
