= Dragonworld (video game) =

1984 adventure video game

- Publisher: Telarium
- Writers: J. Brynne Stephens (based on the novel by Byron Preiss and Michael Reaves)
- Platforms: Apple II, Commodore 64, MS-DOS, MSX
- Release: 1984
- Genre: Interactive fiction

Dragonworld is an interactive fiction game with graphics. The game was published by Telarium (formerly Trillium), a subsidiary of Spinnaker Software, in the year 1984. The game was based on the novel written in 1979 by Byron Preiss and Michael Reaves; text for the game was written by J. Brynne Stephens.

== Reception ==
A German reviewer recognized the detailed graphics and the atmospheric fantasy prose. Text parser, graphics and storyline got the score "sehr gut" (very good).
