= Perry Mason: The Case of the Mandarin Murder =

1985 video game

- Developers: Telarium, Idealogic
- Publishers: Spinnaker Software, Audiogenic Software
- Engine: Spinnaker Adventure System
- Platforms: Apple II, Atari ST, Commodore 64, MS-DOS, MSX2
- Release: 1985
- Genre: Interactive fiction
- Mode: Single-player

Perry Mason: The Case of the Mandarin Murder is an interactive fiction video game with graphics. The game was published by Telarium (formerly known as Trillium), a subsidiary of Spinnaker Software, in 1985.

== Description ==
The game is based on the popular TV series Perry Mason starring Raymond Burr, who played the fictional defense attorney of the same name created by Erle Stanley Gardner. The player must save client Laura Knapp from being convicted of the murder of her husband Victor.

== Reception ==
Antic magazine in 1985 called Perry Mason "a major breakthrough in interactive fiction."
