= Shadowkeep (video game) =

1984 video game

- Developer: Telarium
- Publisher: Spinnaker Software
- Platform: Apple II
- Release: 1984
- Genres: Role-playing, interactive fiction
- Mode: Single-player

Shadowkeep is a first person role-playing video game and interactive fiction video game with graphics. The game was published by Telarium (formerly known as Trillium), a subsidiary of Spinnaker Software, in the year 1984. It was the first computer game to be novelised.

== Gameplay ==
The player character is Practor Fime, an apprentice blacksmith. The goal of the game is to rescue the wizard Nacomedon, who has been trapped in his castle, the eponymous Shadowkeep, by an evil Demon, Dal'brad. At the beginning of the game you recruit 9 other characters, whose stats you can decide on, and then use these characters to navigate various rooms inside the castle in order to find and then release the wizard.

== Release ==
Shadowkeep was released for Apple II computers and was written in Ultra II. The game was stored on 4 floppy disks. Progress in the game would be saved directly to the game disk, without the ability to return to the default state, so players were advised to first copy the game onto 4 blank disks so the game could be played from the start again. Players could also save progress in the game to a fifth disk, which could be used to restore progress in the game in conjunction of the 4 modified disks.

== Reception ==
In a GameSpy interview, Shadowkeep was called "a groundbreaking product at the time", "which paved the way for more complex products like Eye of the Beholder and its peers".

== Legacy ==
Shadowkeep is a fantasy adventure novel by Alan Dean Foster published in 1984 by Warner Books. It is a novelisation of the video game and the first ever novelisation of a video game ever produced. The German translation was published in 1987.

== Reviews ==
- The V.I.P. of Gaming Magazine #3 (April/May, 1986)
