= Personk =

1978 video game

- Developer(s): Tom Snyder
- Publisher(s): Tom Snyder
- Platform(s): Microcomputer
- Release: 1978
- Genre(s): Edutainment
- Mode(s): Single-player

Personk is a 1978 video game, and the debut work of Tom Snyder, who would later release many educational series under Tom Snyder Productions.

== Development ==
Snyder is an educator and video game developer. Snyder, who had a master's degree in teaching, attained a teaching job in the 1970s and eventually began thinking about teaching aids.

In 1978, Snyder had a meeting arranged with the head of game acquisitions at Parker Bros. He hoped to present a wood-wire-string contraption named Personk, that was a simplified model of a computer. Despite having planned the meeting for months, constantly redesigning the game and putting considerable time and money into the project, he went to the meeting on the wrong date and lost the opportunity.

This event gave Snyder a creative burst of energy; within the week he had purchased a microcomputer, taught himself to program, and transformed the three-dimensional Personk into a piece of software for children with the assistance of a Radio Shack Model 1.

== Legacy ==
His first innovation, the game turned into an experiment that foreshadowed the rest of his career. Snyder would immediately follow the game with a series of educational titles collectively referred to as The Search Series.
