= Fast math =

Fast math may refer to:

- Floating-point arithmetic § "Fast math" optimization, by computer software program compilers
- Mental calculation, arithmetical calculations made quickly by the mind, within the brain, with no help from any supplies (such as pencil and paper) or devices such as a calculator
- FASTT Math, a mathematics educational software developed and released by Scholastic Corporation in 2005
