= The Scoop (video game) =

1986 video game

- Developer: Telarium
- Publishers: Telarium; Spinnaker Software
- Platforms: Apple II, MS-DOS
- Release: 1986: Apple II; 1989: MS-DOS
- Genre: Adventure
- Mode: Single-player

The Scoop is a mystery adventure game published by Telarium, a subsidiary of Spinnaker Software, in 1986 for Apple II and re-released by Spinnaker Software in 1989 for MS-DOS. The plot is based on the collaborative detective novel of the same name, written in 1931 by Agatha Christie, Dorothy L. Sayers, E. C. Bentley, Anthony Berkeley, Freeman Wills Crofts, and Clemence Dane.

== Gameplay ==
MS-DOS title screen

The player impersonates a journalist working for the down-on-its-luck newspaper The Daily Courier. He is sent to investigate two murders which may, or may not, be connected. The player has five days to solve the crimes and provide enough evidence to lead to an arrest, otherwise The Daily Courier will go out of business.

NPCs in the game have a set routine and go about their business in different locations, meaning the player will sometimes have to follow them and eavesdrop on their conversations in order to collect clues.

Because of the short time limit to solve the crimes, the player will often have to restart the game entirely in order to get everything done on time.
