= Congo (novel) =

1980 novel by Michael Crichton

- First edition cover
- Author: Michael Crichton
- Language: English
- Genre: Science fiction novel, Lost world, Adventure novel
- Publisher: Knopf
- Publication date: November 12, 1980
- Publication place: United States
- Media type: Print (hardcover)
- Pages: 348
- ISBN: 0-394-51392-4
- OCLC: 6602970
- Dewey Decimal: 813/.54 19
- LC Class: PS3553.R48 C6 1980
- Preceded by: Eaters of the Dead
- Followed by: Sphere

Congo is a 1980 lost world science fiction novel by Michael Crichton, the fifth under his own name and the fifteenth overall. The novel centers on an expedition searching for diamonds and investigating the mysterious deaths of a previous expedition in the dense tropical rainforest of the Congo. Crichton calls Congo a lost world novel in the tradition founded by Henry Rider Haggard's King Solomon's Mines, featuring the mines of that work's title.

== Plot summary ==
Earth Resources Technology Services (ERTS), seeks a source of type IIb diamonds, which are naturally boron-doped and thus useful as semiconductors, from Zinj, a fictional lost city. In 1979, an ERTS expedition searches the rainforests of the Virunga region in the Congo for the city. The expedition is destroyed by primates resembling grey-haired eastern gorillas; a video of the event is transmitted to ERTS in Houston via satellite.

Another ERTS expedition, led by Karen Ross, is launched to investigate the death of the first team and reach Zinj. The expedition includes mercenary Charles Munro; Amy, a female mountain gorilla from Virunga who communicates with humans using sign language; and Peter Elliot, Amy's trainer. Amy is included because she has produced fingerpainted images matching the description of Zinj. A consortium of ERTS's competitors also launch an expedition. The consortium's expedition arrives at Zinj first but is destroyed by the primates. Ross' expedition arrives at Zinj, find the remains of the consortium expedition, and survive a night attack by the primates.

Elliot examines the corpses of primates killed during the night and concludes that they are not taxonomically true gorillas. They are gorilla/chimpanzee, possibly even human, hybrids, with their height and mass closer to humans. Their behavior is atypical of gorillas; the primates are highly aggressive, partially nocturnal, extremely social, and form troops of over a hundred. By comparison, silverbacks form troops of a dozen and are aggressive only when threatened. Elliot intends to name them Gorilla elliotensis after himself.

The expedition explores the ruins of Zinj. Ross uses her computers and infrared technology to digitally reconstruct bas-relief frescoes which show that the primates were bred and trained in Zinj to defend the city and communicate via sign language, being employed as night guards—hence their tactics—with human troops being the daytime guards. The primates have a complex spoken language and use crafted stone paddles to crush skulls. Amy calls the primates "bad gorillas"; she is from the region, and her mother was killed by the primates.

The expedition's attempt to retreat fails, and communications with ERTS is cut by a solar flare. Elliot and Amy translate three phrases of the primate's language; "go away", "no come", and "bad here". Recordings of these phrases by Amy are broadcast during the night; this confuses the primates and halts an attack.

The expedition returns to the diamond mine and in an attempt to unearth more diamonds, Ross uses seismic shaped explosives, which instead trigger the eruption of a nearby volcano. The city, mines and the primates are buried. The expedition's survivors escape and are trapped in a crashed consortium plane by indigenous cannibals, but escape in a hot air balloon found in the wreck.

The epilogue describes some post-expedition events. Ross resigns from ERTS, and later works for the United States Geological Survey. Munro sells 31 carats of diamonds he recovered from Zinj to Intel for a revolutionary new computer processor. Project Amy is disbanded due to Amy's maturity, and she is reintroduced into the wild and is later observed teaching her offspring sign language. The location of the city of Zinj is buried under a lava flow estimated to be 800 metres (2,600 ft) deep.

== Adaptations ==
Crichton wanted to produce a modern-day version of King Solomon's Mines. He pitched the idea to 20th Century Fox who bought the film rights before the story had even been written. Crichton received a $1.5 million advance for the novel, screenplay and as a directing fee. He had never worked that way before, usually writing the book then selling it. He eventually managed to finish the book and it became a bestseller. Crichton started writing the screenplay in 1981 after completing the film Looker. He had enjoyed working with Sean Connery on The Great Train Robbery and wrote Congo hoping to make the film version with Connery in the lead and Crichton to direct. In 1987 he was still hoping to make the film with Connery and Crichton himself directing but this did not happen. Connery did go on to play Allan Quatermain—the character who provided the inspiration for Munro—in The League of Extraordinary Gentlemen.

In 1995, a film version of Congo was released, directed by Frank Marshall and starring Laura Linney, Dylan Walsh, Ernie Hudson, Tim Curry, Grant Heslov, Joe Don Baker and Shayna Fox as the voice of Amy. It received negative reviews from critics, and was nominated for several Golden Raspberry Awards including Worst Picture.

In 1984, Telarium released a graphic adventure video game based on Congo. Because Crichton had sold all adaptation rights to the novel, he set the game—named Amazon—in South America, and Amy the gorilla became Paco the parrot.

== Influences ==
The use of language by gorillas was inspired in part by the efforts of Dr. Penny Patterson to teach American Sign Language to Koko.
