= Richard Robinson (chief executive) =

American publisher (1937–2021)

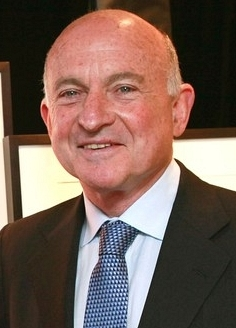
- Robinson in 2011
- Born: Maurice Richard Robinson Jr. May 15, 1937; Pittsburgh, Pennsylvania, U.S.
- Died: June 5, 2021 (aged 84); Chilmark, Massachusetts, U.S.
- Education: Harvard College; St Catharine's College, Cambridge; Teachers College, Columbia University
- Occupations: Chief executive, educator
- Employer: Scholastic Corporation
- Spouses: Katherine Woodroofe (m. 1968; div.); Helen V. Benham (m. 1986; div. 2003)
- Children: 2, with Helen V. Benham

Maurice Richard Robinson Jr. (May 15, 1937 – June 5, 2021) was an American business executive and educator. From 1975 until his death in 2021, Robinson was the chief executive officer of Scholastic Corporation. Robinson was noted for bringing many book franchises to younger readers, such as Harry Potter and Captain Underpants.

== Early life ==
Robinson was born in 1937 in Pittsburgh, Pennsylvania. He was the oldest of five children of Florence née Liddell and Maurice R. Robinson; he had three sisters and one brother. He was raised in Manhattan.

Robinson attended high school at Phillips Exeter Academy and earned his Bachelor of Arts in government at Harvard College in 1958. The following year, in 1959, he studied at St Catharine's College, Cambridge, in England.

After Cambridge, Robinson became a high school English teacher in Evanston, Illinois for two years. In the mid-1960s, he began working as a classroom magazine editor at Scholastic Corporation.

In 1963, he studied educational administration at Teachers College, Columbia University but did not pursue a degree there; he would later become a benefactor of Teachers College.

== Business career ==
In 1971, Robinson became a board member of Scholastic, the educational publishing company founded by his father in 1920. He became President of Scholastic in 1974 and CEO a year later. He was elected to the position of chairman of the board in 1982.

Through the first years of his tenure as Scholastic CEO, the company faced financial constraints and had modest success. Under his leadership, the company became an important children’s book publisher. It had great success with the Harry Potter series and Captain Underpants, and broke ground with Alex Gino’s George. However, it did face controversy, with some viewing Harry Potter as inappropriate for younger readers, the company's main demographic. The New York Times said that Robinson made it possible for the Harry Potter and The Hunger Games novel franchises to become mainstream in the United States.

Robinson oversaw the digitizing of reading materials published by the company, and advocated for company diversity. In 2016, Scholastic and Robinson saw controversy over the publication of a picture story titled A Birthday Cake for George Washington, which showed one of Washington's slaves, the chef Hercules, preparing a cake for him. The book was pulled by Scholastic after widespread criticism of the book’s failure to convey the realities of slavery.

In describing his goal for Scholastic’s publications to be informed by the changing culture, Robinson said, "We are dealing with issues like global warming, racial inequality, in a way that doesn’t polarize the issue but gives points of views on both sides and is a balanced neutral position, but not in a sense of being bland".

== Personal life ==
In 1968, Robinson married Katherine Woodroofe, a magazine editor at Scholastic. They later divorced. Robinson was married to Helen V. Benham, who founded the Early Childhood Division at Scholastic, from 1986 until 2003. They had two sons. He lived in New York City and owned a condo in Greenwich Village until 2016. Robinson said that James Joyce's A Portrait of the Artist as a Young Man was an inspiration for his tenure as Scholastic CEO.

He died on June 5, 2021, while on vacation with his family on Martha's Vineyard in Massachusetts, aged 84. The cause was said to be either a stroke or a heart attack.

== Awards and honors ==
Robinson received an honorary National Book Award. PEN America noted him for his contributions to free expression in literature and publishing. The 2021 film Clifford the Big Red Dog was dedicated to his memory.
