= Software Publishing Corporation =

American business software company (1980–1996)

- Industry: Software
- Founded: April 1980
- Defunct: October 1996
- Fate: Acquired by Allegro New Media, Inc.
- Successor: Vizacom (formerly Allegro New Media)
- Headquarters: Mountain View, California, USA
- Key people: Fred Gibbons, Janelle Bedke, John Page – Founders
- Products: pfs:Write, Harvard Graphics

Software Publishing Corporation (SPC) was a Mountain View, California–based manufacturer of business software, originally well known for its "pfs:" series (and its subsequent "pfs:First" and "pfs:Professional" derivative series) of business software products, it was ultimately best known for its pioneering Harvard Graphics business and presentation graphics program.

Though SPC's earliest product was for the Apple II personal computer, most of its products were for use on text-based MS-DOS desktop computers, with non-graphical-user-interfaces (GUI), long before the graphical GUIs of Macintosh or Microsoft Windows existed. A salient benefit of Harvard Graphics, then, was that it brought sophisticated on-screen graphics capabilities to computers running the normally non-graphical, text-based DOS operating system. This factor played a role in the company's ultimate demise in 1996, as Windows was shipping on most desktop computers. Windows incorporated built-in graphical capabilities, so much of what Harvard Graphics provided was no longer needed. SPC scrambled to develop a Windows version of Harvard Graphics, but big competitors and their Windows-native business and presentation graphics tools had so penetrated the Windows market by then that it was just too little, too late. As MS-DOS began to disappear, so did SPC's revenues.

== Early history ==
First logo of Software Publishing Corporation (an abstraction of a 5.25-inch floppy disk)

SPC was established in 1980 by three former Hewlett-Packard employees, Fred Gibbons, Janelle Bedke, and John Page, with an eye to producing packaged software for personal computers like the Apple II. It sold Personal Filing System (PFS), a database program for Apple II computers, and PFS:Report, a report generator for it. With the advent of the IBM PC the following year, the company quickly shifted focus to the burgeoning MS-DOS-based desktop computer market, which also included a fast-growing number of IBM PC compatible computers. The Apple II PFS product eventually led to the "pfs:" series of products for DOS.

By early 1984, InfoWorld estimated that SPC was the world's ninth-largest microcomputer-software company, with $14 million in 1983 sales. The company was shipping 35-45,000 copies of pfs: products monthly. In 1984 IBM executed an OEM-style agreement pursuant to which SPC would develop the IBM Assistant Series, which was an only slightly enhanced, but completely rebranded version of the "pfs:" family of products (described in the next section) such that no mention of SPC was present in the software or its documentation; and which IBM intended to sell with its IBM PC and PCjr computers. IBM advertised the suite using a Chaplin-esque figure getting all of his ducks in a row, in a Super Bowl TV ad, and in print ads. By only a year later, in 1985 SPC company had achieved $50 million in revenue from the IBM deal, alone.

== Major products ==
SPC's first product, its "PFS" brand database for Apple II computers, was reworked, improved, and then released as pfs:File, a flat-file database for DOS. It was the first of a family of products released by SPC under the "pfs:" brand which, when installed onto the same computer, combined to form a sort of office suite which included companion products pfs:Write (a word processor), pfs:Plan (a spreadsheet), pfs:Report (reporting software), and pfs:Graph (business graphics software). Other, mostly utilitarian products bearing the "pfs:" brand subsequently emerged, including pfs:Access (for data communications), pfs:Easy Start (a menuing utility), and pfs:Proof (a proofreading utility). Eventually, SPC offered a low- to mid-level desktop publishing product called pfs:Publisher; and it packaged the core word processing, database and spreadsheet products into a suite named pfs:Office. While relatively limited in their capabilities compared with better-known and more powerful products like the DOS database dBase III, the DOS spreadsheet Lotus 1-2-3, and the DOS word processor WordPerfect, the trio of SPC products proved popular, because of their simplicity and ease-of-use, with beginning and intermediate DOS PC users.

Lighter-weight versions of the core "pfs:" word processing, database, spreadsheet and data communications programs were released as a single, integrated suite called pfs:First Choice for DOS, intended to directly compete with, but be more economical than, Microsoft Works for DOS. The pfs:First Choice product subsequently led to what SPC had hoped would be a larger series of far lighter-weight products bearing the "pfs:First" label, the most famous of which, after pfs:First Choice, was an entry-level desktop publishing product called pfs:First Publisher, and its fonts and graphics add-ons. A business graphics package called pfs:First Graphics came next, so that the "pfs:First" series could have lightweight business graphics like the original, and slightly heavier-weight, "pfs:" series offered. There was no compatibility between the "pfs:First" series and the "pfs:" series.

In response to business users' requests for a far more powerful, yet still economical word processor that really could compete with the likes of the better-known and more-popular DOS word processors like WordPerfect (and even, by then, Microsoft Word for DOS, SPC released an enhanced version of pfs:Write called pfs:Professional Write, a much higher-powered word processor which was eventually joined by companion products pfs:Professional File (a more powerful database, to better compete with dBase), and pfs:Professional Plan (a more powerful spreadsheet, to better compete with Lotus 1-2-3). These became SPC's higher-end, truly business-oriented and, eventually, networkable and multi-user software product line. Starting with the second versions of the Professional trio, the "pfs:" was dropped from the product names, making them, simply, Professional Write, Professional File, and Professional Plan. When all three were installed on the same machine, the separately-purchased products could interact with one another as a sort of office suite. The trio also had somewhat limited interoperability with SPC's completely separate business graphics software product called Harvard Graphics, and its later series companion Harvard Total Project Manager. There was, however, no compatibility of the trio, or the Harvard series products, with any of SPC's other earlier "pfs:" or "pfs:First" products.

Starting with the second versions of the Professional Write, Professional File and Professional Plan trio, a separately-purchased Professional series networking add-on (available in 5-user, 10-user and larger packs) could be obtained so that they could all function in a multi-user local area networking (LAN) environment utilizing rudimentary file locking (but not record locking) via NetBIOS on such as Novell's NetWare, or Banyan VINES.

In 1986, SPC released its groundbreaking Harvard Presentation Graphics, one of the first PC applications which allowed users to combine charts, clip art, and text and display fonts into presentation slides.

== Corporate decline and demise ==
Computer Intelligence estimated in 1987 that SPC had 5% of the Fortune 1000 PC presentation software market. The power of Harvard Graphics product made it extremely popular with DOS PC users, helping to drive SPC's sales revenues to $150 million by 1990. As the popularity of Harvard Graphics soared, SPC shifted focus to high-end business graphics software, and so it sold the "pfs:" and related series software to Spinnaker Software in 1991. This move made SPC an essentially one-product company.

The shift ultimately led, however, to the company's demise. By 1993 the DOS-based Harvard Graphics product accounted for 80% of SPC's revenue. It was valuable to users because it brought to the normally-text-only, non-graphical DOS environment a rich and powerful on-screen graphical presentation tool. However, as more and more business desktop computers began shipping with the Microsoft Windows GUI sitting atop DOS in Windows version 1.0 through Windows 95, and then also in the full operating system version Windows NT, the need for software like Harvard Graphics, which did the kind of on-screen graphical heavy lifting so needed in the non-graphical DOS environment, was suddenly no longer necessary because Windows had on-screen graphics capability built right into it.

Though SPC scrambled to release a Windows 3.0 version of Harvard Graphics in 1991, big competitors had, by then, deeply penetrated the Windows business and presentation graphics market with products like Microsoft's PowerPoint and Lotus Development Corporation's Freelance, relegating the Windows version of Harvard Graphics's revenues to less than 20% of SPC's overall sales. Though SPC had begun to rebuild its product line to include products in addition to the DOS and Windows versions of Harvard Graphics—such as ActiveOffice, ASAP WordPower, ASAP WebShow, Harvard ChartXL, Harvard Spotlight, the Superbase 2.0, and Personal Publisher (which SPC acquired from T/Maker) -- all of said new products, even combined with the Windows version of Harvard Graphics, accounted for only a tiny part of SPC's overall revenues. So as DOS desktop computers began to disappear from US businesses by 1994, and revenues from the DOS-based version of Harvard Graphics disappeared with them, SPC's overall revenues plummeted.

In 1994, the firm laid off half its staff and Gibbons stepped down as chief executive. In 1996 SPC was purchased by, and became a subsidiary of, Allegro New Media, Inc., a New Jersey–based multimedia publisher of interactive CD-ROM software applications, including 25 titles in five product lines, the most notable of which were its Entrepreneur Guides, Berlitz Executive Travel Guides, Learn To Do Series and Business Reference Series.

Earlier that year, Allegro had purchased Serif Inc, which produced publishing and graphics software for the SOHO market, including PagePlus Home/Office 95, PagePlus 3.0 and DrawPlus 2.0, as well as a variety of clipart and font collections. Allegro believed that the move would expand its product lines and distribution capabilities.

Allegro renamed itself Vizacom in late 1996 and began actively marketing its new products; however, in 2001 Vizacom sold Serif back to its original management, and included the licensure to Serif of the Harvard Graphics line of products in the sale.

Serif continued to market Harvard Graphics 98 for Windows until 2017, when the product was taken off the market.

== See also ==
- pfs:Write
- T/Maker
- Superbase (database)
