= Morris Adjmi Architects =

American architectural firm founded in 1997

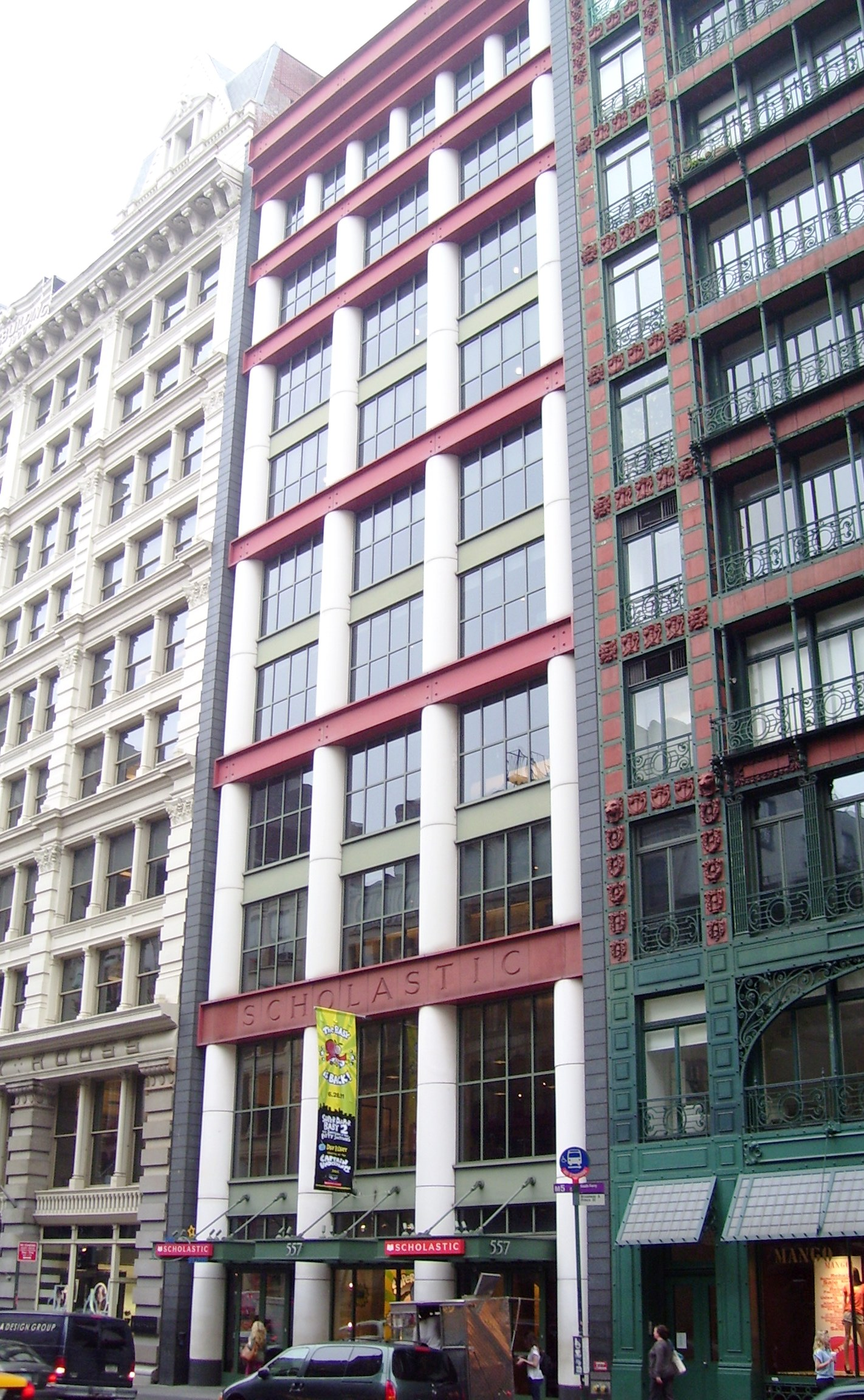

Practice information
- Partners: Morris Adjmi
- Founded: 1997
- Location: New York

Significant works and honors
- Buildings: The Wythe Hotel; 837 Washington; The Sterling Mason; The Schumacher; 408 Greenwich Street; Theory Building; Scholastic Building; High Line Building; 30 East 31st Street; 140 North 10th Street; Atlantic Plumbing; Prudential Center; Austin Nichols House; 116 University Place; 363 Lafayette Street; 540 West 26th; 70 Henry Street

Website
- www.ma.com

Morris Adjmi Architects is a New York City-based architecture and interior design firm that provides design services to corporate, commercial and residential clients.

== Background ==
The company was founded by Morris Adjmi (FAIA), a New Orleans native who began his career after obtaining his Masters of Architecture degree from Tulane University. In 1981 Adjmi began working with the Italian architect Aldo Rossi and, in 1986, the two jointly opened Studio di Architettura in New York City. They collaborated on numerous international projects including the Hotel Il Palazzo in Fukuoka, Japan, Disney’s Celebration Office Complex in Orlando, Florida, the American Broadcasting Company Headquarters in Burbank, and the Scholastic Corporation headquarters in New York City. Adjmi has edited two books on Aldo Rossi's life and work.

After the death of Rossi in 1997, Adjmi established his own design firm, Morris Adjmi Architects, also known as MA.

MA's work is often influenced by specific artists, such as Rachel Whiteread's influence on the design of the facade of 83 Walker Street. Because of this focus, the firm has created an art program.

== Design projects ==
MA's work includes commercial, office, residential, and hospitality buildings primarily in Manhattan and Brooklyn, with an increasing number of projects in other cities around the US.

In 2010, the firm completed two buildings for the NYU School of Law, one of which included the restoration of the historic Provincetown Playhouse. The firm also has several projects based in the Historic Gansevoort Market District (better known as the Meatpacking District), including a $55 million building that sits directly over the High Line Elevated Park at the intersection of 14th Street. Other projects in Manhattan include buildings in Tribeca, SoHo, and the Ladies' Mile Historic District.

MA has also completed several commercial buildings and hotels in Florida, including Celebration Place in Celebration, Florida, as well as a residential development in Albany, New Providence, Bahamas.

MA designed the multi-building Atlantic Plumbing development in Washington DC for developer JBG Smith.

In 2016, MA started the design of two new buildings in Chicago's West Loop neighborhood, both in collaboration with GREC Architects. One building will be a 170-room boutique hotel at 200 North Green Street and a multi-family residential building at 1035 West Van Buren. 1035 West Van Buren was completed in 2017.

In 2016, Adjmi began work on The Standard, a condominium development in his native New Orleans. The Standard at South Market opened in 2018. Following the project opening, Morris Adjmi Architects opened an office in New Orleans.

In 2018, Adjmi's first high-rise building at 30 East 31st Street was reported to have topped-out in New York City.
