= Scholastic Building =

Building in Manhattan, New York

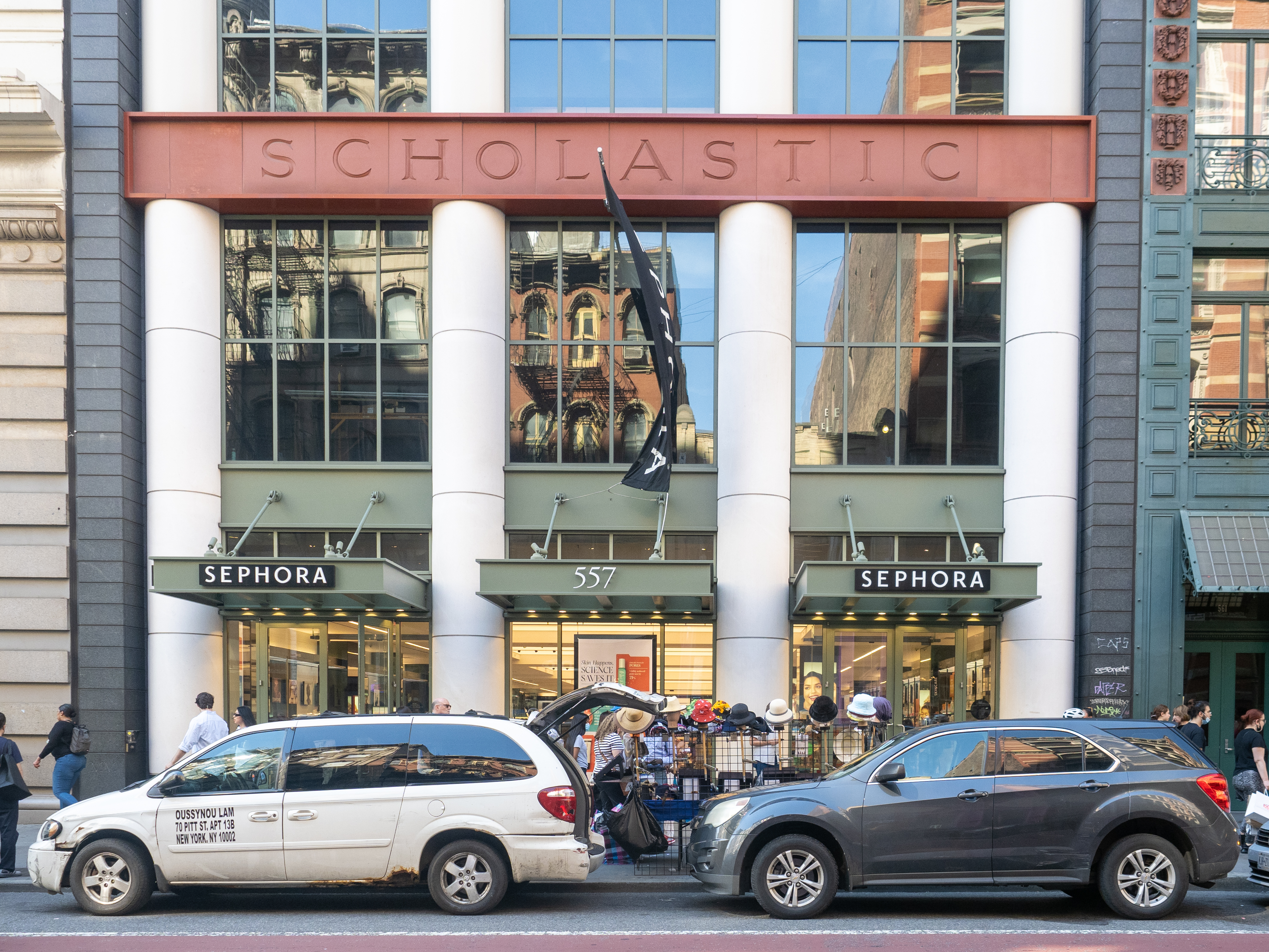
- Scholastic Building (2022)
- Interactive map of the Scholastic Building area

General information
- Status: Completed
- Type: Headquarters of the Scholastic Corporation
- Location: 557 Broadway, Manhattan, New York 10012
- Coordinates: 40°43′27″N 73°59′54″W
- Completed: 2001
- Owner: Scholastic Corporation

Height
- Architectural: 47.24 metres (155.0 ft)

Technical details
- Floor count: 10

Design and construction
- Architect: Aldo Rossi

The Scholastic Building is the 12-story headquarters of the Scholastic Corporation, located on Broadway between Prince and Spring Streets in the SoHo neighborhood of Manhattan, New York City. Built in 2001, it was the first new building to be constructed in the SoHo-Cast Iron Historic District, replacing a one-story garage built in 1954. It is the only building in New York ever to be designed by Italian architect, Aldo Rossi. Originally conceived of in his New York office, it was completed and refined by a disciple of his, Morris Adjmi. It is respectful of the neighboring buildings and pays homage to the district's cast iron architectural identity. The cast iron architecture that defines this neighborhood straddles between the classical and industrial periods of New York's past. According to historian William Higgins, "the building’s columnar Broadway façade, in steel, terra-cotta, and stone, echoes the scale and the formal, Classical character of its commercial neighbors. The rear façade, on Mercer Street, extracts a gritty essence from its more utilitarian surroundings of plain cast iron and weathered masonry." The Scholastic Building was designed and assembled using a "kit of parts" methodology, which is similar to a time when the façades of SoHo's cast-iron buildings were built by ordering the building elements and ornaments in parts from a catalog, having them cast off-site in foundries, and assembled on site.
