= Telarium =

Defunct video game publisher

- Formerly: Trillium
- Industry: Video game industry
- Founded: 1984
- Founder: C. David Seuss
- Defunct: 1987
- Headquarters: Cambridge, Massachusetts, USA
- Products: Adventure games
- Parent: Spinnaker Software

Telarium Corporation (formerly Trillium) was a brand owned by Spinnaker Software. The brand was launched in 1984 and Spinnaker was sold in 1994. The headquarters were located in Cambridge, Massachusetts, USA. The President of Telarium was C. David Seuss, the founder and CEO of Spinnaker Software.

== History ==
C. David Seuss founded Trillium Corporation as a subsidiary of Spinnaker Software, which he had also founded and of which he was the CEO. Within the first year of its founding, Trillium's name was changed to Telarium due to legal issues presented by a book publisher. Telarium primarily released adventure games, with the exception of Shadowkeep, a role-playing game. The games were based on books, and the development of each game led to cooperation between the software developers and the authors. The first author who was consulted was the science fiction novelist Michael Crichton. Crichton collaborated on the development of Telarium's game Amazon, which was loosely based on his book Congo.

== Adventure games ==
Telarium published eight adventure games. The games belonged to the genre of interactive fiction with graphics. One game (Shadowkeep) was also a role-playing video game. They were based on works of literature in the literary genres of science fiction, fantasy, crime fiction and legal drama. Often they were developed in cooperation with established writers. The game development was a part of Spinnakers marketing strategy in the adventure game market in the 1980s: Adventure games by Telarium were targeted at grown-up players, while those by Windham Classics–another Spinnaker subsidiary–were targeted at children. The development was managed by Seth Godin.

- Amazon, 1984 (written by Michael Crichton, partly based upon his novel Congo)
- Fahrenheit 451, 1984 (developed in cooperation with Ray Bradbury and based upon his science fiction novel Fahrenheit 451. Bradbury contributed a sequel to the game)
- Rendezvous with Rama, 1984 (developed in cooperation with Arthur C. Clarke and based upon his science fiction novel Rendezvous with Rama. Clarke contributed a different ending to the game)
- Dragonworld, 1984 (written by Byron Preiss and Michael Reaves, based upon their fantasy novel Dragonworld)
- Shadowkeep, 1984 (first video game to be novelised: Shadowkeep, Warner Books 1984 by Alan Dean Foster).
- Perry Mason: The Case of the Mandarin Murder, 1985 (based upon the fictional defense attorney Perry Mason, authored by Erle Stanley Gardner)
- Nine Princes in Amber (based upon the fantasy novels Nine Princes in Amber and The Guns of Avalon by Roger Zelazny)
- The Scoop, written 1986 and rerelased by Spinnaker Software 1989 (based upon the detective serials The Scoop and Behind the Screen by Agatha Christie et al.)

Two more adventure games were announced, but not published (Starman Jones, based on a science fiction novel by Robert A. Heinlein, and The Great Adventure, based on a science fiction novel by Philip Jose Farmer).

== Reception ==
The Telarium adventures received critical acclaim. They were praised for the prime quality text, the detailed graphics and the interactive opportunities. The cooperation with famous writers like Ray Bradbury, Arthur C. Clarke and Michael Crichton was accentuated as a special feature of Telarium.
