= Soup2Nuts =

American animation studio (1980–2015)

Tom Snyder Productions
- Formerly: Computer Learning Connection (1980–1983)
- Type: Subsidiary
- Industry: Video games Animation
- Founded: May 12, 1980; 46 years ago
- Founder: Tom Snyder
- Defunct: December 30, 2015; 10 years ago
- Fate: Closed
- Headquarters: Watertown, Massachusetts, United States
- Parent: Torstar Corporation (1996–2001); Scholastic Corporation (2001–2015)

Soup2Nuts Inc.
- Trade name: Soup2Nuts
- Type: Animation studio
- Industry: Television
- Founded: February 2001; 25 years ago
- Founder: Tom Snyder
- Defunct: August 7, 2015; 11 years ago
- Fate: Folded into Scholastic
- Headquarters: Watertown, Massachusetts, United States
- Parent: Torstar Corporation (2001); Scholastic Corporation (2001–2015)

Soup2Nuts (sometimes referred to as Soup2Nuts Studios, and formerly part of Tom Snyder Productions) was an American animation studio founded by Tom Snyder. The studio is known for its animated comedy series, its use of Squigglevision (a technique of animation that reuses frames to make the animation look more kinetic), and for its style of improvisation in voice acting.

== History ==
Tom Snyder, a teacher at Shady Hill School, began designing computer programs in the 1970s to enhance his 4th to 8th grade classes' learning environments. In 1980, Jere Dykema, the parent of one of Snyder's Shady Hill students, gave Snyder $30,000 to establish Computer Learning Connection (later renamed Tom Snyder Productions) for a 30% equity stake. Dykema also loaned CLC $100,000, which they paid back.

Tom Snyder Productions created and produced its first TV show, Dr. Katz, Professional Therapist in 1995 for Comedy Central. On February 23, 1996, the company announced it would be acquired by Torstar Corporation for more than $10 million. Torstar would provide Tom Snyder with additional cash to expand its education and television operations. Later, the company created and produced Home Movies which aired originally on UPN, but after cancellation, continued on Adult Swim. In 2001, Snyder's television division was renamed Soup2Nuts, named after the company's involvement in the production of programs from beginning to end. Soup2Nuts also produced shorts, book adaptations, commercials, and interactive online series. Tom Snyder Productions and Soup2Nuts were purchased by Scholastic Corporation on December 21, 2001. Tom Snyder Productions continued to develop educational products under Scholastic until 2015.

Soup2Nuts began work on WordGirl, a superhero educational show for PBS Kids, in 2007. It had won numerous national awards including Best Direction for an Animated Children's Program and Outstanding Writing in Animation.

On March 13, 2015, Scholastic announced that they were closing the studio. According to Kyle Good, the senior vice president of corporate communications for Scholastic, the decision was made to shut down Soup2Nuts as part of an overall restructuring of the parent company. Good commented, "We are restructuring that part of the business closer to our core businesses which are children's publishing and education. We have other options to continue television programming." Scholastic had cut the number of employees to just nine people earlier in 2015.

Astroblast! was Soup2Nuts' final production. Scholastic closed Tom Snyder Productions on December 31, 2015; the company's FASTT Math product was acquired by Houghton Mifflin Harcourt.

== Productions ==
=== Video games ===
- Personk (1978)
- The Search Series (1980)
- Snooper Troops: Case #1: The Granite Point Ghost (1982)
- Snooper Troops: Case #2: The Case of the Disappearing Dolphin (1982)
- In Search of the Most Amazing Thing (1983)
- Agent USA (1984)
- Run for the Money (1984)
- American Challenge: A Sailing Simulation (1986)
- Sub Mission (1986)
- Our Town Meeting (1987)
- Gamma Force in Pit of a Thousand Screams (1988)
- Lane Mastodon vs. the Blubbermen (1988)
- Decisions, Decisions (1988)
- ZorkQuest: Assault on Egreth Castle (1988)
- ZorkQuest: The Crystal of Doom (1989)
- Fizz & Martina (1992)
- Math Mysteries (2000)
- Science Seekers (2000)

=== Animation ===
Title	Creator	Co-produced by	Year(s)	Network
Dr. Katz, Professional Therapist	Jonathan Katz	HBO Downtown Productions	1995–1999; 2002	Comedy Central
Dr. Katz, Professional Therapist	Tom Snyder	HBO Downtown Productions	1995–1999; 2002	Comedy Central
How Do You Spell God? ("The Tale of the Watch" sequence)			1996	HBO
Science Court	Tom Snyder	Burns & Burns Productions	1997–2000	ABC
Cosby ("A Very Nice Dance" and "War Stories" animated sequences)			1999	CBS
Home Movies	Brendon Small; Loren Bouchard	Burns & Burns Productions	2001–2004	Adult Swim
The Dick & Paula Celebrity Special	Tom Snyder	FX Productions	1999	FX
The Lewis Lectures	Tom Snyder		2000; released in 2002	Adult Swim
Pops! An Animated Musical Adventure (pilot)	Candy Altman	Altman/Mugar Productions	2001	WGBH-TV
Watering Hole (interstitial series)		Williams Street	2002	Adult Swim
Hey Monie!	Dorothea Gillim		2003	Oxygen BET
Fridays (Show & Tell segments)	Various		2004	Cartoon Network
O'Grady	Tom Snyder; Carl W. Adams; Holly Schlesinger	Noggin, LLC	2004–2006	Noggin (The N)
Time Warp Trio	Jon Sciezska	WGBH Boston	2005–2006	NBC
Time Warp Trio	Jon Sciezska	WGBH Boston	2005–2006	Discovery Kids
Sunday Pants (Thadlow's Driving School segments)	Sven Gordon; Stuart Hill		2005	Cartoon Network
Assy McGee	Matt Harrigan; Carl W. Adams	Williams Street	2006–2007 (Season 1 only)	Adult Swim
WordGirl	Dorothea Gillim	Scholastic Media	2007–2015	PBS Kids Go!
Weston Woods (various shorts)	Various	Weston Woods	2009–2015	
Between the Lions (animated sequences)		WGBH-TV; Sirius Thinking	2009–2010	PBS Kids Go!
SciGirls (replaced by Curious Media)	Twin Cities PBS		2010–2015	PBS Kids Go!
Chuck Vanderchuck's 'Something Something' Explosion			2011–2015	PBS Kids Go!
Sesame Street ("4307" and "4504" animated sequences)	Joan Ganz Cooney; Lloyd Morrisett	Sesame Workshop	2012, 2014	PBS Kids
Astroblast!	Bob Kolar	Scholastic Media	2014–2015	Sprout; NBC
