= American Challenge: A Sailing Simulation =

1986 video game

The American Challenge: A Sailing Simulation
- Publisher: Mindscape
- Platforms: Apple II, Commodore 64, MS-DOS
- Release: 1986
- Genres: Simulation, racing

The American Challenge: A Sailing Simulation is a sailing simulation and racing game developed by Tom Snyder Productions and published by Mindscape in 1986. It allows two players to race online via modem.

== Gameplay ==
The game, portrayed through wireframe 3D graphics, sees the player race against the computer or another player via modem on eight courses. The player controls the sail, rudder and centerboard, while the screen equipment monitor the wind speed and direction. The boat responds realistically to the player's movements. The game is fashioned after the America's Cup. Players were able to verse players at other computer via a direct serial connection, and could verse themselves to beat their own time. Players can take the American Challenge by trying to beat the Australian team.

== Development ==
The game was shipped with a cassette that featured a sailing tutorial on one side and a song named 'Win Back the Cup" on the other.

There was a challenge whereby if a player was able to beat Australia in the program's Cup Race, they become eligible for a contest to win a trip to Australia to watch the 1987 America's Cup races.

The game came packaged with a music record featuring a sailing tutorial on one side and an original song entitled Win Back the Cup on the other; The New York Times recommended players learn the ropes using the audio tutorial rather than the "poorly organised manual".

== Reception ==
In a review appearing when the game was first released, The New York Times commented on the unique gameplay for the time, whereby two players could compete via modem. In 2017, PC Magazine noted the game's "incredible depth for a game with very primitive wire frame 3D graphics". US Computer magazine Family Computing called American Challenge a first rate program. Tilt also gave high praise to the game's animation. Kiplinger's Personal Finance strongly recommended the title to lovers of sailing and games, describing it as the perfect intersection of the two. The Pantagraph and The Morning News felt games such as this title or Electronic Arts' The Official America's Cup Sailing Simulation offered a way for people who wanted to experience the America's Cup in a more meaningful way than through TV coverage. The Chicago Tribune deemed it a "a patriotic exhortation to bring home the cup" rather than a game.

The New York Times felt the series aimed to "close the gap between the real and the vicarious with simulations of the sports experience". Washington Apple Pi Journal felt the game was "well documented" and deemed the graphics similar to Flight Simulator II. Compute! noted that the game was challenging and left only a small room for error for the player to be victorious.

Russell Sipe reviewed the game for Computer Gaming World, and stated that "For sailor/gamers this program is an absolute must. Non-sailor/gamers will also find it to be a good value and may learn some valuable "ground school" sailing techniques."
