= 408 Greenwich Street =

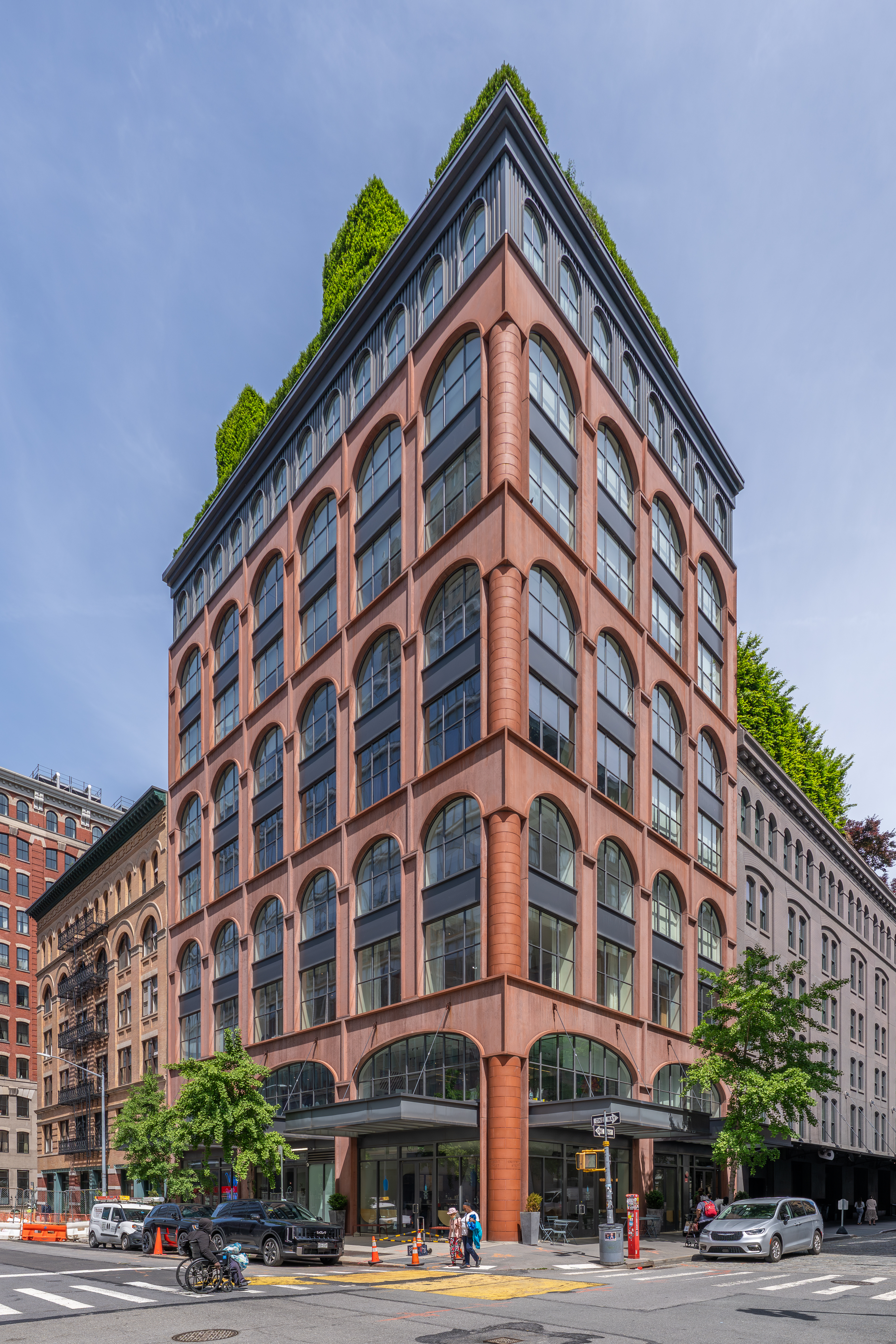
- Interactive map of the 408 Greenwich Street area

General information
- Type: Mixed-use
- Architectural style: Postmodern
- Location: Tribeca, Manhattan, New York City, U.S.
- Coordinates: 40°43′18″N 74°0′36.5″W
- Completed: 2008

Height
- Height: 99.68 feet (30.38 m)

Technical details
- Floor count: 9

Design and construction
- Architecture firm: Morris Adjmi Architects

408 Greenwich Street is a post-modern neoclassical condominium designed and built by Morris Adjmi Architects. It is located in the Tribeca neighborhood of Manhattan, New York City. The design of the building was inspired by Italian architect, Aldo Rossi. It is included in the Fifth Edition of the AIA Guide to New York City.
