= Sales presentation =

Line of talk to persuade someone to buy something

As a selling technique, a sales presentation or sales pitch is a line of talk that attempts to persuade someone or something, with a planned sales presentation strategy of a product or service designed to initiate and close a sale of the product or service.

A sales pitch is essentially designed to be either an introduction of a product or service to an audience who knows nothing about it, or a descriptive expansion of a product or service that an audience has already expressed interest in. Sales professionals prepare and give a sales pitch, which can be either formal or informal, and might be delivered in any number of ways. A sales pitch may be invited by an organization looking to obtain supplies or services, for example in a commissioning context.

== Elements ==
=== First impression ===
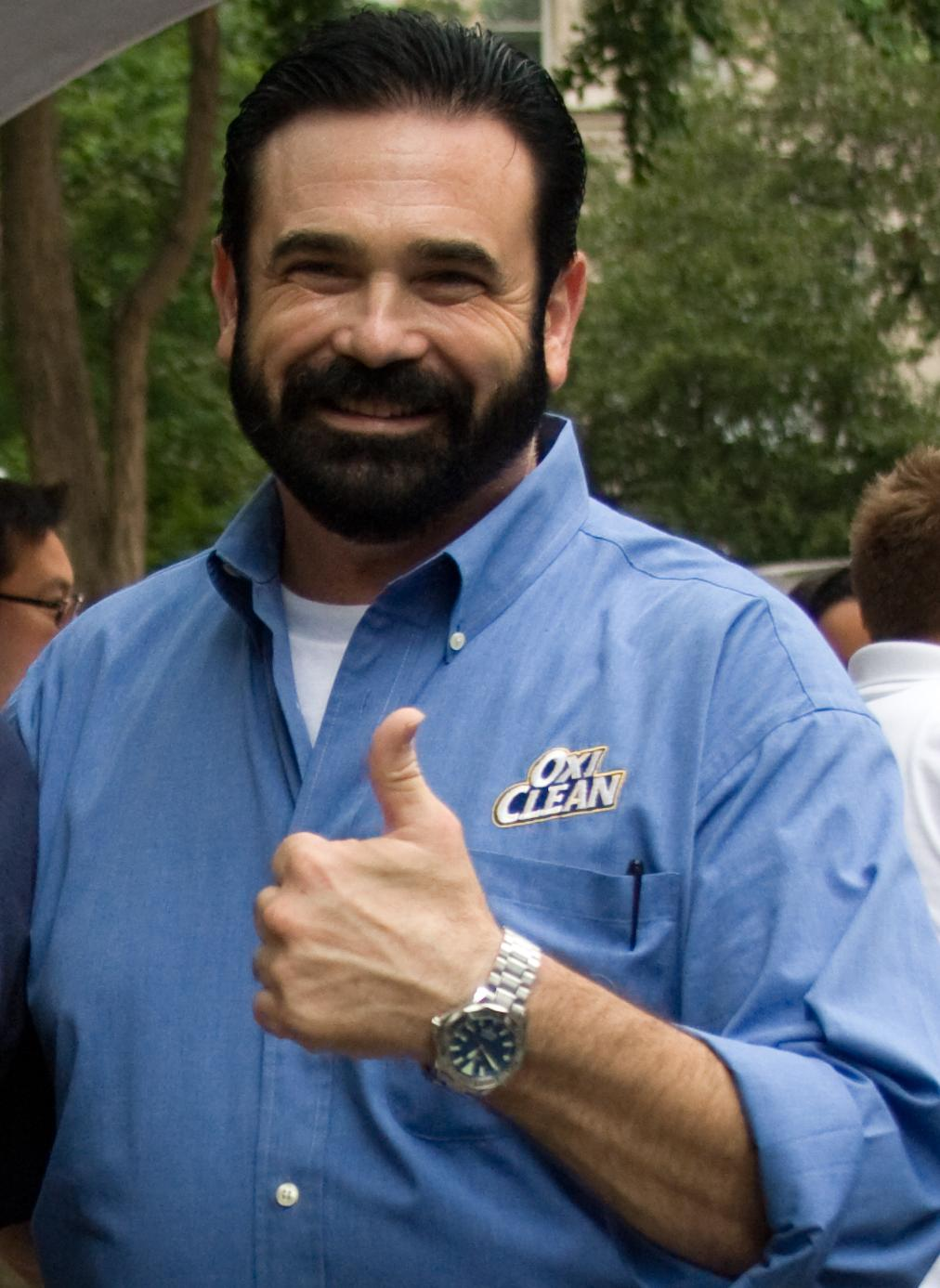
Billy Mays was well known for his sales pitches on American television.

The first visual and audible impression upon a market or client can appeal to any of the five senses in order to initiate excellent chemistry between the buyer and seller.

A strategy to attract potential clients and emphasize the overall advertisement. An exchange of currency is not always required; rather, the pitching party seeks a formal trade agreement or contract. With a wide variety of selling techniques used to "pitch", it is possible to apply one or a combination in a single attempt.

Inspired by what has worked in the past from successful contributors to the art of the pitch, at least a slight modification is always required in order for it to be an authentic and most of all an effective pitch, otherwise the tone would not fit the sellers outfit and in critical situations be spotted as a fake by the candidate and in such a case defying the purpose.

For a strikingly good pitch, one must know exactly what the other party wants and doesn't want and be informed of as much information as possible about the candidate being pitched to. Focus on a virtual balance of the candidate's needs and wants to maximize one's leverage when in the process of a pitch. Overall meaning: one gets only one chance to make a good first impression. At least two senses must connect: vision, and hearing. But the more one can connect at a single point of impact, the better.

=== Beginning statement ===
Usually the first sentence of a sales pitch is supposed to be either an attention-grabbing statement or a positive statement introducing the best information about the provider of goods or service. A method is usually selected depending on available attention span from the prospective client.

There are certain groups with a lower attention span (for example children) for whom a sales pitch must capture their attention within the first few seconds to be effective. Frequently used methods for this are beginning a talk with a surprising or even shocking statement which the targets then stay to see the conclusion of.

Normally people with children, shopkeepers, and people in a hurry are not able to give much attention especially if the explanation is not immediately intriguing or it is in broken English. Sellers of low-value, fast-moving consumer goods (FMCG) are usually known to deploy the first method.

In the second strategy, 'positive statement begins' is adopted in solution selling usually in direct selling to corporate and or high value and or capital goods selling. Here, the purpose of the positive statement is to emphasize a particular positive aspect of a provider to brand it according to seller's situational need.

== Slides ==
=== History ===
Prior to 1980s the visuals (transparencies and slides for the slide projector) were used for at least two decades. Arrival of the personal computers greatly simplified flipping of the slides and the use of multimedia elements thus creating the "widespread addiction to slideware". By late 1980s Microsoft Powerpoint displaced the original market leader, Harvard Graphics, as a tool of choice for preparing and displaying the slides.

A presentation slide deck is sometimes called a pitch deck.

=== Pitch deck ===
A pitch deck is a slide show and oral presentation that is meant to trigger discussion and interest potential investors in reading the written presentation. The content of the presentation is usually limited to the executive summary and a few key graphs showing financial trends and key decision-making benchmarks. If a new product is being proposed and time permits, a demonstration of the product may be included.

== Issues ==
In 2021–22, advertisers and agencies raised concerns about the excessive volume of work and associated pressures entailed in making sales pitches for advertising opportunities. Criticisms raised argued that pitches were being requested unnecessarily often and their production being made too complex and too costly. The Pitch Positive Pledge was adopted as a result, according to which industry players would ensure a pitch was actually required before proceeding, "run a positive pledge" and "provide a positive resolution". Feedback to unsuccessful bidders is a key element of this process.

== See also ==
- Barker (occupation)
- Elevator pitch
- Persuasive technology
- Patter
- Pitch (filmmaking)
- Pitch book
- Sales tunnel
- Selling technique
- Testimonial
