= Science Seekers =

- Genre(s): Edutainment
- Developer(s): Tom Snyder Productions, American Museum of Natural History
- Publisher(s): Tom Snyder Productions
- Platform(s): Windows, Macintosh
- First release: Science Seekers: Hidden in Rocks; 2000
- Latest release: Science Seekers: Safe Water

Science Seekers is a trilogy of science-related educational video games for the Windows and Macintosh platforms, developed and published by Tom Snyder Productions. The American Museum of Natural History collaborated in the series' development and got a grant from NASA. The series consists of Science Seekers: Hidden in Rocks, Science Seekers: Endangered Species and Science Seekers: Safe Water.

== Gameplay ==
The player is part of a team called the "Science Seekers", who are headquartered in the American Museum of Natural History in New York City. In each game, they will be assigned a mission, which videos and real-life scientists will explain its nature and the steps they must take to accomplish it, making use of collected data and methods throughout.

== Development ==
=== Educational goals ===
The series demonstrates how to solve problems in real life with science. The content consists of videos and clear summaries to give children motivation, evaluation and effort towards teamwork. Teacher's guides are provided to allow tutors to give revision sessions. Students can use the content to conduct scientific experiments, do scientific research and learn about technology. They also show the dangers and experiences of natural phenomena.

== Reception ==
=== Awards ===
Year	Nominee / work	Award	Result
2001	Science Seekers	CODiE Award for Best School Based Secondary Education Software	Won
