= Fizz & Martina =

- Genre(s): Edutainment
- Developer(s): Tom Snyder Productions
- Publisher(s): Tom Snyder Productions
- Platform(s): Windows, Macintosh
- First release: Buddies for Life; 1992
- Latest release: Project Sphinx

Fizz & Martina's Math Adventures is a collection of five math-related educational video games for the Windows and Macintosh platforms, developed and published by Tom Snyder Productions. The games were incorporated with the California Learning Assessment System (CLAS). The series consists of Buddies for Life, Blue Falls Elementary, Caves of Blue Falls, Lights, Camera, Fractions! and Project Sphinx.

== Development ==
The series teaches arithmetic, story problems, estimates and operations. The main idea was to teach math as part of a storyline within a narrated slideshow. The movie sequences and challenges catch students' interest and the math problems are meaningful so that they can be used to simulate real life solutions. The material covers four math strategies for assessment, namely Open-ended Problems, Enhanced Multiple-choice Questions, Investigations and Portfolios. They are also designed to reinforce math and to motivate students to learn.

== Reception ==
The Journal felt the series was "mathematically and educationally sound".

=== Awards ===
Year	Nominee / work	Award	Result
	Fizz & Martina's Math Adventures	EdPress Distinguished Achievement Award	Won
	Fizz & Martina's Math Adventures	Software & Industry Association Codie Award Finalist - Best New Curriculum Software for Early Education	Won
	Fizz & Martina's Math Adventures	Technology & Learning Award of Excellence	Won
	Fizz & Martina's Math Video Kits	Parents' Choice	Won
