= Math Mysteries =

Collection of five math-related educational video games

- Genre: Edutainment
- Developer: Tom Snyder Productions
- Publisher: Tom Snyder Productions
- Platforms: Windows, Macintosh
- First release: Math Mysteries: Measurements; 2000
- Latest release: Math Mysteries: Advanced Fractions

Math Mysteries is a collection of five math-related educational video games for the Windows and Macintosh platforms, developed and published by Tom Snyder Productions. The games were designed to fit the NCTM standards at their time of development. The series consists of Math Mysteries: Measurements, Math Mysteries: Whole Numbers, Math Mysteries: Fractions, Math Mysteries: Advanced Whole Numbers and Math Mysteries: Advanced Fractions.

== Development ==
=== Educational goals ===
The series focuses on aiding students who struggle with mathematical problems. Products come with two CD discs. One is the Whole Class CD, which allows teachers to configure specific skills for their students. Students learn to understand problems, collect vital information, work in groups and find the answers to math problems. The other is the Mystery CD, which allows students to independently explore for themselves and reinforce the skills they learned in class.

== Reception ==
=== Awards ===
Year	Nominee / work	Award	Result
2000	Math Mysteries: Advanced Fractions	Parent's Choice Group Approval Winner	Won
2000	Math Mysteries	Apple Design Award: Best Mac User Interface	Won
2000	Math Mysteries	Children's Software Revue All Star Software Award	Won
2000	Math Mysteries	2000 New Media Competition: Finalist	Won
2000	Math Mysteries	All Star Software for Schools - Top 100 Titles	Won
2000	Math Mysteries	MultiMedia Schools Four Star Report Card	Won
2000	Math Mysteries	Technology & Learning 'Quick Pick'	Won
