= In Search of the Most Amazing Thing =

1983 video game

- Developer: Tom Snyder Productions
- Publisher: Spinnaker Software
- Platforms: Apple II, Atari 8-bit, Commodore 64, MS-DOS
- Release: 1983
- Genre: Adventure
- Mode: Single-player

In Search of the Most Amazing Thing is a video game designed by Tom Snyder Productions. It was published by Spinnaker Software in 1983 for the Apple II, Atari 8-bit, Commodore 64, and MS-DOS. Although marketed as a children's game, it drew acclaim from players of all ages for its original concept and imaginative game world.

== Plot ==
The game begins on a mysterious planet, Porquatz, with the androgynous player, Terry Bailey, exploring his/her subterranean home city by elevator. Terry's mysterious uncle, Smoke Bailey, has recently arrived in a strange craft known as the B-Liner, a hybridized all-terrain vehicle and hot-air balloon. Finding Smoke napping in his room, and waking him from his reverie with repeated shouts, Terry is tasked by Smoke to embark in the B-Liner on a quest for a lost artifact known only as "The Most Amazing Thing".

Navigating the world outside the city, known as the Mire, is a considerable challenge. Terry Bailey must use the B liner to travel.There are creatures called mire crabs. Terry must be careful to avoid these as they will stun him/her.

== Gameplay ==
To investigate notable objects in the Mire, the player can perform EVA using a personal jetpack. Encounters range from the benign Popberry trees, which provide food for the player, to the deadly Mire crabs, to the quizzical merchant aliens who provide Terry with vital clues and supplies for the quest. To trade with these aliens, the player must create Musix, a simple line-drawing translated by the game into a melody, which is then evaluated by the aliens according to their aesthetics, which vary according to the tribe they belong to. Due to their intrinsic shyness, the aliens communicate with the player entirely in a form of semaphore code, utilizing the only visible part of their anatomy: twin antennae, protruding coyly over the edge of the aliens' "desks".

== Development ==
The game was Tom Snyder's first title after joining Spinnaker Software to make educational software for home and the classroom. A March 1983 edition of Arcade Express said the game was due to be released that month. A self-professed "software novelist", his approach to the game's development was like a novelist outlining the opening chapters of a book, working on them as written fiction pieces before translating the content to a game.

== Reception ==
Byte magazine called In Search of the Most Amazing Thing "an exciting adventure [and] a valuable educational tool", and added that it "clearly points out the versatility of the IBM PC as an educational tool, a recreational computer, and a business machine. I highly recommend this game". InfoWorld's Essential Guide to Atari Computers recommended the game among educational software for the Atari 8-bit. PC Magazine praised the game's logic, humor, and pacing, while Antic thought that it was "complex, challenging, and imaginative". Australian Apple Review praised the game as "probably the best adventure program ever written for computers".
