= Jonathan Katz =

American actor and comedian (born 1946)

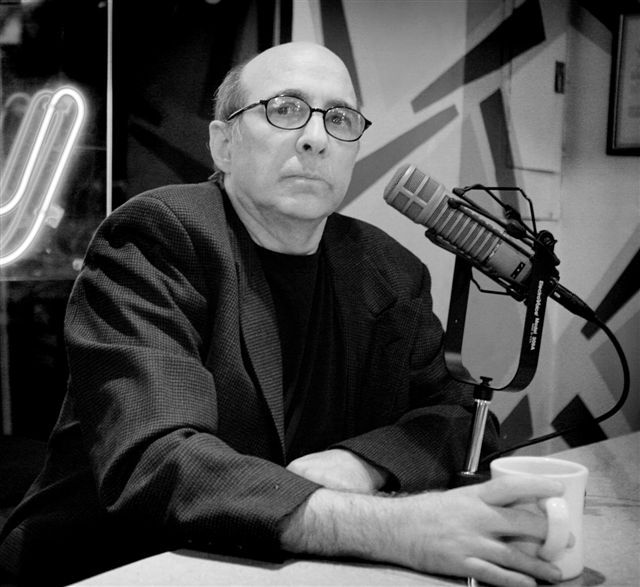
- Katz in 2006
- Born: Jonathan Paul Katz; December 1, 1946 (age 79); New York City, New York, U.S.
- Education: Goddard College
- Occupations: Actor; comedian
- Years active: 1980s–present
- Website: www.jonathankatz.com

Jonathan Paul Katz (born December 1, 1946) is an American actor and comedian best known for his starring role as Dr. Katz in the animated sitcom Dr. Katz, Professional Therapist. He is also known for voicing Erik Robbins in the UPN/Adult Swim series Home Movies. He produces a podcast titled Hey, We're Back and can be heard on Explosion Bus.

== Early life ==
Katz was born to a Jewish family, although he has said that he is not devout. His father, Sidney Roosevelt Katz, was a secretary-treasurer for the AFL-CIO, and his mother, Julia, died at a relatively young age. Katz has said that his father was not a particularly comedic man, but did tell a couple of jokes on occasion, which Katz has adapted into his comedy routine.

=== Multiple sclerosis ===
In 1996, Katz was diagnosed with multiple sclerosis. The initial symptoms began in 1996: "I was working on a TV show called Ink with Ted Danson, and after every episode we would take a curtain call and I noticed that I needed a head-start."

Hiding his condition became too much of a burden for Katz, and he eventually disclosed it. Now he speaks publicly as part of a tour sponsored by a manufacturer of medications used to treat MS.

"People have been pretty supportive; nobody ever had me in mind for an action film because of the kind of work I do—mostly in the world of animation, which is not a big issue because as a person, I can't run that fast; as a cartoon character, I can fly—literally."

Katz, who now uses a motorized scooter and performs onstage with the aid of a cane, says he does not regret his decision: "One of the reasons I disclosed my condition is because it is much easier to live with MS than to pretend you don't have it. If I could convince everyone of that, my job here is done."

== Career ==
Dr. Katz originally aired on Comedy Central from 1995 to 2002, and starred Katz as a professional therapist whose patients were chiefly other comedians and actors. He received a Primetime Emmy Award for his work on the show in 1995 for Outstanding Voice-Over Performance. He has also created the show Raising Dad in 2001. His voice can also be heard in the animated series Home Movies, a show with many ties to Dr. Katz, as well as on the Adult Swim animated comedy series Squidbillies where he performed uncredited voice-overs as "The Rapist" in season 2 and as the Holodeck Therapist in season 5. During that time, in 1999, he then signed an overall development deal with Paramount Network Television.

In 2007, Katz joked to d entertainment editor Bessie King about the success of his Comedy Central show and the recent release of the full series on DVD. "I'm so proud of that work and I'm a compulsive name dropper, [but] when I did a movie with Ice Cube over the summer I said...I hope my best work is not behind me but if it is, I'm glad it's Dr. Katz," he said. In 2007, he released a stand-up album titled Caffeinated. In 2009, he can be seen (or heard) as Freezy, the Burl Ives-inspired animated snowman star of Turbocharge: The Unauthorized Story of the Cars, a comedy biopic about The Cars, which Katz narrates throughout.

In 2011, he starred as Jon Gold on the web series Explosion Bus created by Tom Snyder and co-developed with Katz, Snyder and Tom Leopold. In the spring of 2012, Katz taught a theater class at Brandeis University in Short Form Comedy. On September 3, 2014, Katz appeared on Ken Reid's TV Guidance Counselor Podcast.

== Personal life ==
As a young man, Katz dated Valerie Velardi, who later became the first wife of Robin Williams.

Katz went on to marry his current wife, Susan (born 1955), with whom he has two daughters: Julia (born 1983) and Miranda (born 1992).

His paternal grandfather, Bernath Katz, immigrated from Budapest, Hungary.

He is a close friend of playwright David Mamet, with whom he attended Goddard College. Katz co-wrote House of Games with Mamet and had small roles in the Mamet-directed films Things Change, Homicide, The Spanish Prisoner and State and Main.

Originally a musician and songwriter, Katz fronted a rhythm and blues group called "Katz and Jammers" before serving as the musical director for Robin Williams' 1979 standup tour. In 1998, he released Brandon Project, a blues album.
