= Tom Snyder (animator) =

American animator, writer and producer

- Occupations: Animator; writer; producer
- Years active: 1978–2017

Tom Snyder is an American animator, writer and producer known for creating adult animated sitcom Dr. Katz, Professional Therapist and Science Court, as well as pioneering the Squigglevision animation technique. His most recent project, The Phone Brothers, released in 2017.

== Early career ==
Snyder is a graduate of Swarthmore College, and as an educator he was inducted into the Association of Educational Publishers Hall of Fame. In the early 1980s, Snyder's game development company, Tom Snyder Productions (now Soup2Nuts), developed educational software for Spinnaker Software including Snooper Troops and In Search of the Most Amazing Thing. His educational work includes the series Science Court and educational computer software, such as FASTT Math. Since stepping down as chairman of Tom Snyder Production, he has worked on music composition and writing.

In 1995, Snyder partnered with comedian Jonathan Katz to make Dr. Katz, Professional Therapist, which was picked up by Comedy Central as its first animated series.

In 2011, Snyder partnered again with Katz to create an animated web series, ExplosionBus.com.

== Recent work ==
Since the early 2000's, Snyder had been writing musicals to positive reviews, but expressed dissatisfaction in his own work for lack of stylistic fulfillment. In 2016, he released an audiobook in the format of a musical, a genre he called "AudioMusical" that he hoped to pioneer. His first AudioMusical is titled Is Anyone All Right?, a romantic comedy. In an interview with Joe Kennedy for HeadStuff, Snyder describes his early learning of musical structure and playwriting with, "I never would have been me if I hadn’t discovered this [...] [I]t was really a lifesaver for me, there’s no question about it."

== See also ==
- Soup2Nuts (formerly Tom Snyder Productions)
