= Harvard Graphics =

Presentation and vector graphics program

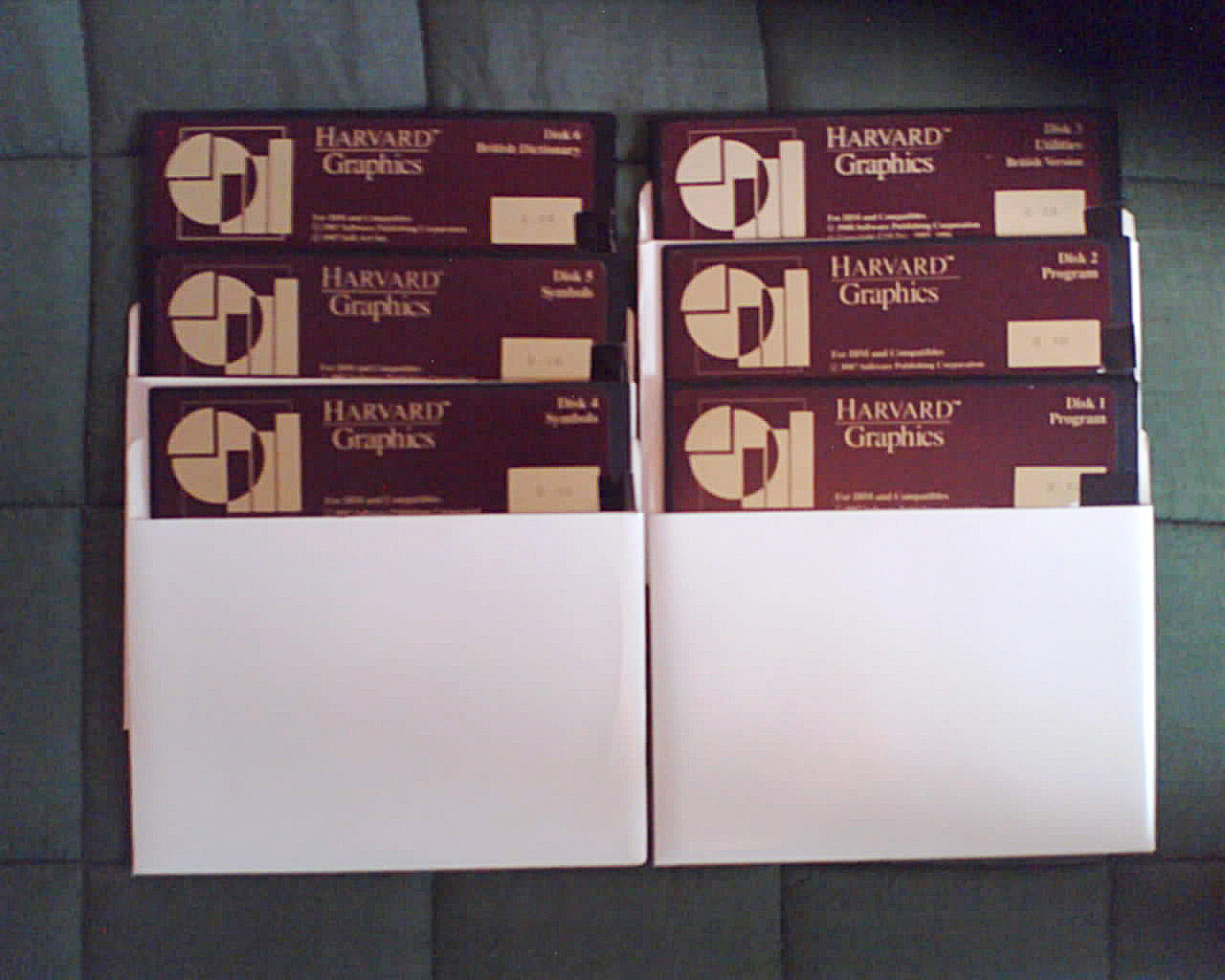
- 6 floppy disk set of version 2.10
- Developer: Software Publishing Corporation
- Release: 1986; 40 years ago
- Operating system: MS-DOS, Microsoft Windows
- Type: Presentation program

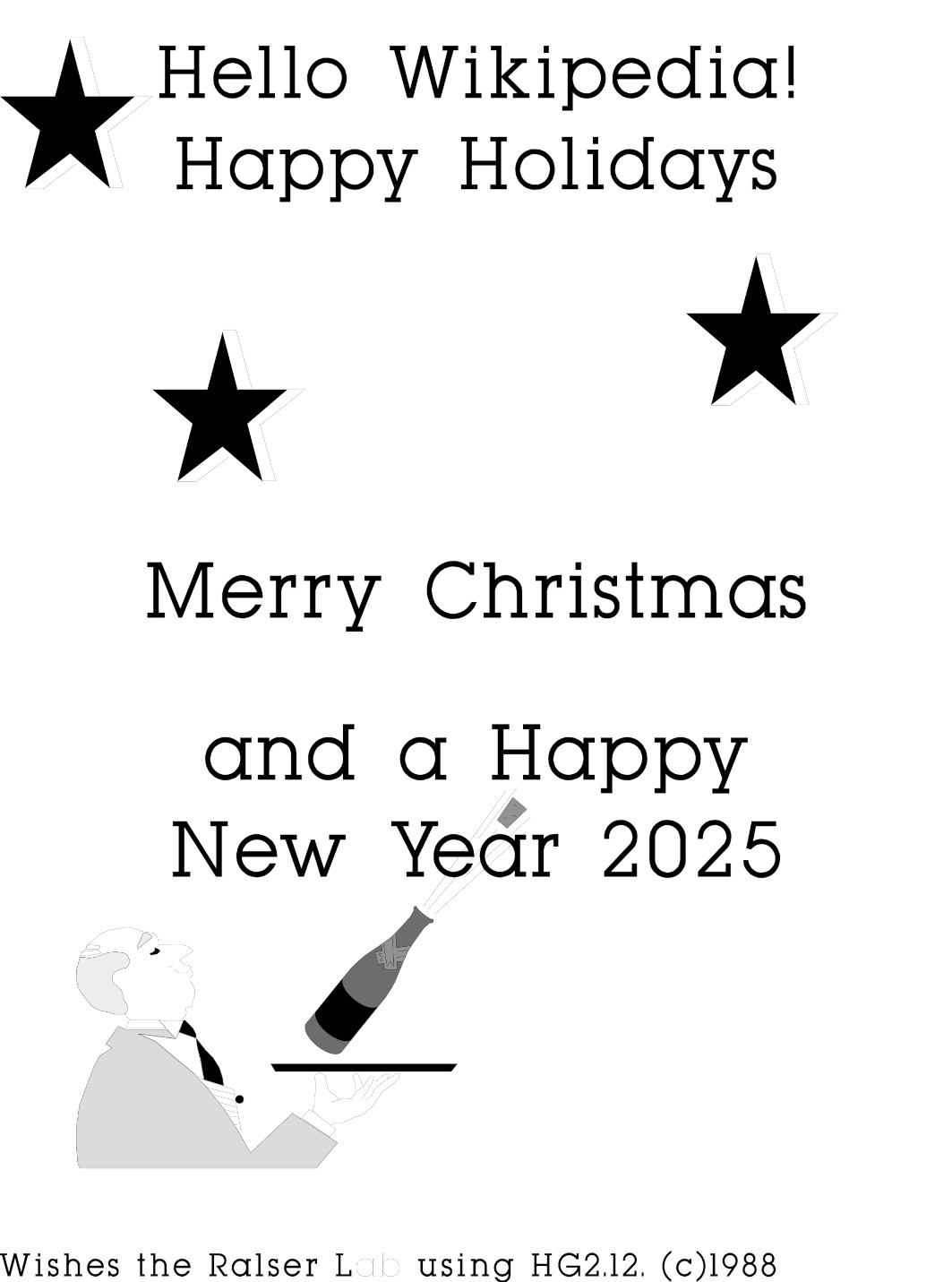
Wikipedia Happy Holiday greetings, created with Harvard Gaphics 2.12 from 1988, on original hardware of the time, an Amstrad PC1640.

Harvard Graphics was a graphics and presentation program for IBM PC compatibles. The first version, titled Harvard Presentation Graphics, was released for MS-DOS in 1986 by Software Publishing Corporation (SPC) and achieved a high market share. It was taken off the market in 2017.

== History ==
Harvard Graphics was one of the first desktop business application software programs that allowed users to incorporate text, information graphics, and charts into custom slideshow presentations. The original version could import data from Lotus 1-2-3 or Lotus Symphony, charts created in Symphony or PFS Graph, and ASCII text. It could export text and graphics to Computer Graphics Metafile (CGM) and to pfs:Write, which was also manufactured by SPC. Its use of vector graphics produced mixed results on the Color Graphics Adapter (CGA) and Enhanced Graphics Adapter (EGA) displays common at the time, but output was usually sent to a slide printer or a color plotter.

"Presentation" was dropped from the name for the second release, which came in 1987, developed by Mario Chaves, Carl Hu, Lenore Kirvay, and Dana Tom. Harvard Graphics 2 added an option to export graphics as Encapsulated PostScript (EPS) files, which allowed users to create graphics in a file format still supported by many programs today. Harvard Graphics 2.0 also added the ability to import the latest Lotus 1-2-3 spreadsheet data before generating graphics, as well as drawing and annotations for graphs. Version 3.0 was not released until 1991, offering improved editing functions, but its graphics and export capabilities were being outperformed by competitors like Aldus Persuasion and Lotus Freelance.

Harvard Graphics was used as bonus product with Windows 95 by Australian Retailer Harvey Norman.

The market leader through the late 1980s, Harvard Graphics struggled as the market shifted to Microsoft Windows. SPC released a version for Microsoft Windows 3.0 in 1991, but its market share never approached the 70% it had previously commanded. The Windows market came to be dominated by Microsoft PowerPoint and then the bundle of PowerPoint into Microsoft Office.

In 1996, Serif purchased exclusive marketing rights to the product line of Harvard Graphics, Inc., and assumed product support responsibilities. Serif continued to market Harvard Graphics 98 for Windows and other software under the Harvard Graphics brand until mid-year 2017, when the product was taken off the market.

== Reception ==
Computer Intelligence estimated in 1987 that SPC had 6% of the Fortune 1000 PC presentation software market. A 1990 American Institute of Certified Public Accountants member survey found that 12% of respondents used Harvard Graphics, second to 1-2-3 (42%) and ahead of Borland Quattro (11%).
