= Scholastic Corporation =

American publishing company

- Logo used since 1986

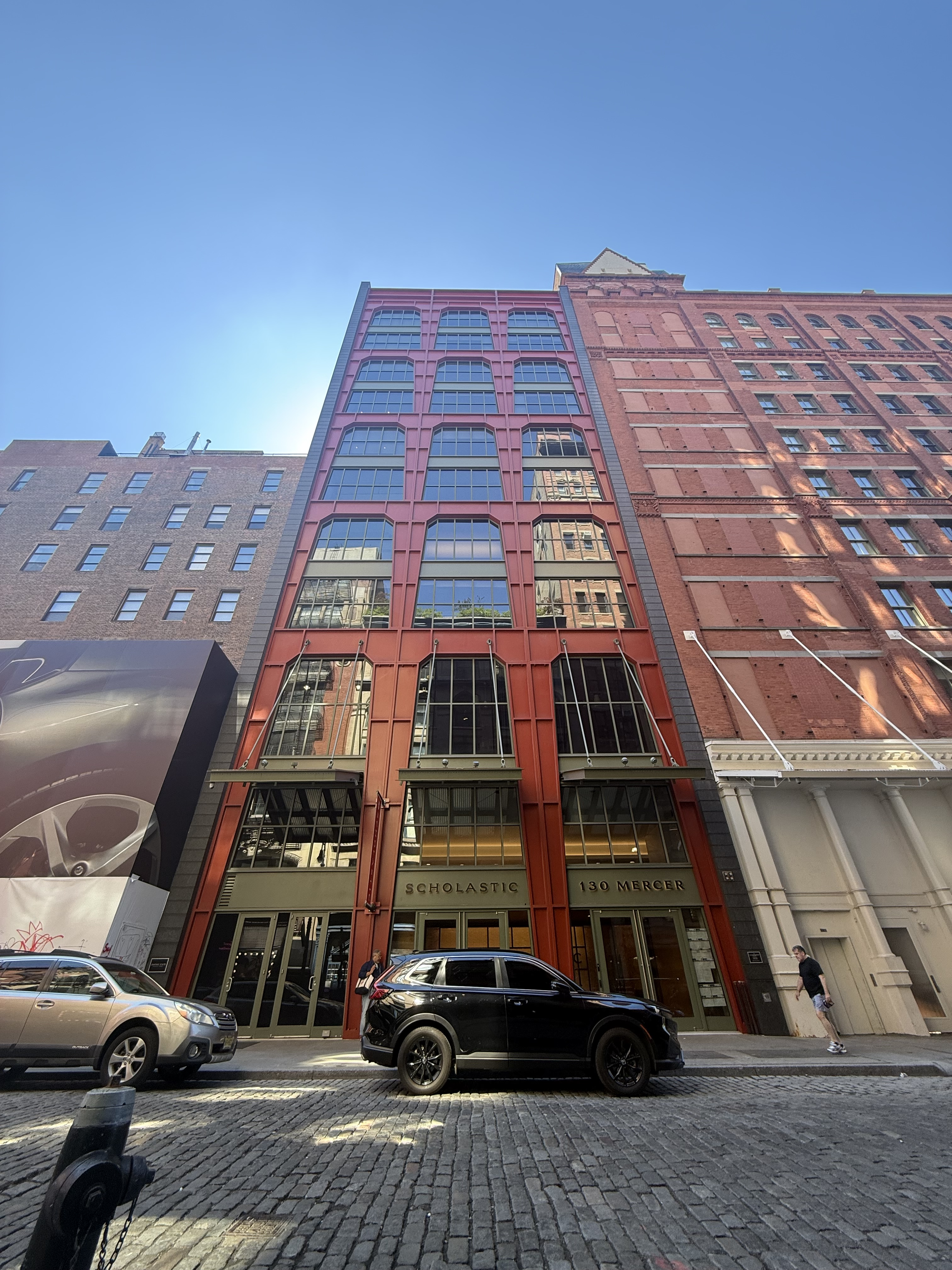
- The Scholastic Building in New York City, the headquarters of Scholastic Corporation
- Formerly: Scholastic Publishing Company (1920–1930); Scholastic-St. Nicholas Corporation (1930–1932); Scholastic Magazines, Inc. (1960–1981); Scholastic Inc. (1981–1986)
- Type: Public
- Traded as: Nasdaq: SCHL; S&P 600 component
- Industry: Publishing; Entertainment
- Founded: October 22, 1920; 106 years ago, in Wilkinsburg, Pennsylvania, U.S.
- Founder: Maurice Robinson
- Headquarters: Scholastic Building, New York City, United States
- Area served: Worldwide
- Key people: Peter Warwick (CEO, president); Haji Glover (CFO)
- Products: Books; magazines; pre-K to grade 12 instructional programs; classroom magazines; films; television
- Revenue: ▼US$1.58 billion (2026)
- Net income: ▲US$56.7 million (2026)
- Number of employees: 8,900 (2019)
- Divisions: Imprints and corporate divisions
- Subsidiaries: Scholastic Entertainment; 9 Story Media Group; Grolier International; Weston Woods Studios
- Website: scholastic.com

Scholastic Corporation is an American multinational publishing, education, and media company that publishes and distributes books, comics, and educational materials for schools, teachers, parents, children, and other educational institutions. Products are distributed via retail and online sales and through schools via reading clubs and book fairs.

Clifford the Big Red Dog, a character created by Norman Bridwell in 1963, serves as the company's mascot.

== Company history ==
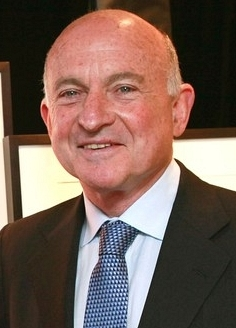
Richard Robinson was the CEO and president from 1975 until his death in 2021

Scholastic was founded in 1920 by Maurice R. Robinson near Pittsburgh as a publisher of youth magazines. Its first publication, The Western Pennsylvania Scholastic, covered high school sports and social activities. The four-page magazine debuted on October 22, 1920, and was distributed in 50 high schools. More publications followed under Scholastic Magazines. In 1948, Scholastic entered the book club business. The company incorporated its first international subsidiary, Scholastic Canada, in 1957. During the 1960s, it established other international publishing locations in England (1964), New Zealand (1964), and Sydney (1968), while also entering the book publishing business. In the 1970s, Scholastic created its TV entertainment division. From 1975 until his death in 2021, Richard Robinson, son of the corporation's founder, served as CEO and president. Scholastic began trading on the Nasdaq on May 12, 1987.

In 2000, Scholastic purchased Grolier for $400 million, and it expanded into video collections the following year. Scholastic developed FASTT Math with Tom Snyder in 2005 to improve student proficiency in multiplication, division, addition, and subtraction through a series of games and memorization quizzes gauging the student's progress. Partnering with Houghton Mifflin Harcourt in 2011, Scholastic developed READ 180 to help students with their reading skills. In February 2012, Scholastic acquired Weekly Reader Publishing from the Reader's Digest Association. In July 2012, Scholastic announced plans to discontinue separate issues of Weekly Reader after more than a century of publication, co-branding the magazines as Scholastic News/Weekly Reader. In 2013, the company developed System 44 with Houghton Mifflin Harcourt to further support reading development. Scholastic sold READ 180 to Houghton Mifflin Harcourt in 2015. In December 2015, it launched the Scholastic Reads Podcasts. On October 22, 2020, Scholastic celebrated its 100th anniversary.

On September 29, 2026, Scholastic announced that it would acquire Cottage Door Press for $71 million, excluding its Luna StoryTime business, which will be spun-off and continued to be led by its founder and CEO, Dick Maddrell.

== Company structure ==
Scholastic Corporation has three business segments: Children's Book Publishing and Distribution, Education Solutions, International and Entertainment. Scholastic holds the perpetual US publishing rights to Harry Potter and The Hunger Games. It is the world's largest publisher and distributor of children's books, alongside print and digital educational materials for pre-K through grade 12. Scholastic is known for its school book clubs and book fairs, classroom magazines such as Scholastic News and Science World, and popular book series including Clifford the Big Red Dog, The Magic School Bus, Goosebumps, Horrible Histories, Captain Underpants, Dumb Bunnies, Animorphs, The Baby-Sitters Club, and I Spy. Scholastic also publishes instructional reading and writing programs, and offers professional learning and consultancy services for school improvement.

== Marketing initiatives ==
Founded in 1923 by Maurice R. Robinson, The Scholastic Art & Writing Awards, administered by the Alliance for Young Artists & Writers, is a competition which recognizes talented young artists and writers from across the United States.

== Imprints and corporate divisions ==
- Trade Publishing Imprints include:
  - Arthur A. Levine Books, which specializes in fiction and non-fiction books for young readers. The imprint was founded at Scholastic in 1996 by Arthur Levine in New York City. The first book published by Arthur A. Levine Books was When She Was Good by Norma Fox Mazer in autumn 1997. The imprint is most notable as the publisher of the American editions of the Harry Potter series by J. K. Rowling. In 2019, Levine left Scholastic to form his own new publisher. Scholastic retained Levine's back catalogue.
  - The Chicken House
  - Graphix, a graphic novel imprint started in 2005.
  - Klutz Press
  - Orchard Books
  - Scholastic Australia – made up of Koala Books, Margaret Hamilton Books, Omnibus Books, and Scholastic Corporation.
- Children's Press (spelled "Childrens Press" from 1945 to 1996) – founded in 1945, and formerly headquartered in 1224 West Van Buren Street, Chicago until it was acquired by Grolier in 1995 moving its operations to New York City and Danbury, Connecticut. It became part of Scholastic Corporation in 2000. It published various publications such as the Rookie Read-About series, A True Book series, Young People's series (Young People's Science Encyclopedia, underwent 10 editions during its 31-year printing from 1962 to 1993 which are 1962, 1964–1966, 1970, 1978, 1982, 1987, 1991, and 1993), and New Frontiers in Science and Young People's Science Dictionary (1964) by the staff of National College of Education (now National Louis University), Young People's World (1966), Young People's Illustrated Encyclopedia (1972), and Young People's Animal Encyclopedia (1980) by Maurice Burton), and the Getting to Know series, and it also has a secondary imprint, Franklin Watts.
- 9 Story Media Group – founded in 2002, it is a media company in Canada. In 2024, Scholastic acquired the company for $186 million.
- Scholastic Reference publishes reference books.

== Scholastic Entertainment ==
Scholastic Entertainment (formerly Scholastic Productions and Scholastic Media) is a corporate division led by Deborah Forte since 1995. It covers "all forms of media and consumer products, and is comprised of four main groups – Productions, Marketing & Consumer Products, Interactive, and Audio." Weston Woods is its production studio, acquired in 1996, as was Soup2Nuts (best known for Dr. Katz, Professional Therapist, Science Court, Home Movies and WordGirl) from 2001 to 2015 before shutting down. Scholastic has produced audiobooks like the Caldecott/Newbery Collection; Scholastic has been involved with several television programs and feature films based on its books. In 1985, Scholastic Productions teamed with Karl-Lorimar Home Video, a home video unit of Lorimar Productions, to form the line Scholastic-Lorimar Home Video, whereas Scholastic would produce made-for-video programming, and became a best-selling video line for kids, and the pact expired for two years, whereas Scholastic would team up with leading independent family video distributor and a label of International Video Entertainment, Family Home Entertainment, to distribute made-for-video programming for the next three years.

=== Streaming service ===
On September 17, 2025, Scholastic launched a free streaming app called Scholastic TV, which contains Clifford the Big Red Dog, The Magic School Bus and other television series created by Scholastic Entertainment. The app is catered towards children aged 2 to 12. It is available on Roku, Amazon Fire TV, iOS, and Android.

=== Filmography ===
==== Series ====
Title	Year(s)	Network	Co-production with
Voyagers!	1982–83	NBC	James D. Parriott Productions & Universal Television (owner)
Charles in Charge	1984–85; 1987–90	CBS; Syndication	Al Burton Productions & Universal Television (owner)
Scholastic's Blue Ribbon Storybook Video	1986	Direct-to-video	Nelvana & Karl-Lorimar Home Video (owner)
Clifford the Big Red Dog	1988	Direct-to-video	Nelvana
My Secret Identity	1988–91	CTV (Canada); Syndication (U.S.)	Sunrise Films (owner), MCA TV
Parent Survival Guide	1989	Lifetime	Scholastic Productions
The Baby-Sitters Club	1990–93	Direct-to-video; HBO	Amber Films, Ltd.
The Magic School Bus	1994–97	PBS Kids	Nelvana & South Carolina ETV
Goosebumps	1995–98	Fox Kids	Protocol Entertainment
Animorphs	1998–99	Nickelodeon (U.S.); YTV/Global (Canada)	Protocol Entertainment
Dear America	1999–2000	HBO Family	
Clifford the Big Red Dog	2000–03	PBS Kids	Mike Young Productions
Horrible Histories	2000–01	CITV	Mike Young Productions & Telegael
I Spy	2002–03	HBO Family	The Ink Tank (season 1) & JWL Entertainment Productions (season 2)
Clifford's Puppy Days	2003–06	PBS Kids	Mike Young Productions (season 1)
Maya & Miguel	2004–07	PBS Kids Go!	
The Amazing Colossal Adventures of WordGirl (interstitial series)	2006–07	PBS Kids	Soup2Nuts
WordGirl	2007–15	PBS Kids	Soup2Nuts
Turbo Dogs	2008–11	Kids' CBC (Canada); Qubo (U.S.)	Smiley Guy Studios, Huhu Studios, CCI Entertainment (owner)
Sammy's Story Shop	2008–09	Qubo	
The Day My Butt Went Psycho!	2013–15	Nine Network (Australia); Teletoon (Canada)	Nelvana; Studio Moshi; Brain Bender Pty Ltd.
Astroblast!	2014–15	Sprout	Soup2Nuts
The Magic School Bus Rides Again	2017–21	Netflix	9 Story Media Group and Brown Bag Films
His Dark Materials	2019–22	BBC One; HBO	BBC Studios, Bad Wolf (owner), New Line Productions
Clifford the Big Red Dog	2019–21	Prime Video; PBS Kids	9 Story Media Group, Brown Bag Films, 100 Chickens
Stillwater	2020–present	Apple TV+	Gaumont Animation
Puppy Place	2021–22	Apple TV+	
Eva the Owlet	2023–25	Apple TV+	Brown Bag Films
Goosebumps	2023–25	Disney+/Hulu	Original Film, Stoller Global Solutions, Gifted And Talented Camp and Sony Pictures Television (owner)
Clifford the Big Red Dog	2027	PBS Kids	9 Story Media Group and Brown Bag Films
Fortune Falls	TBA	TBA	Gaumont Animation
Rocket Park	TBA	TBA	Gaumont Animation

==== Specials ====
Title	Airdate	Network	Notes
Mystery at Fire Island	November 27, 1981	CBS	
The Haunted Mansion Mystery	January 8–15, 1983	ABC	
The Magic of Herself the Elf	July 30, 1983	Syndication	Nelvana, Those Characters from Cleveland (owner)
The Great Love Experiment	February 8, 1984	ABC	
A Different Twist	March 10, 1984	ABC	
The Almost Royal Family	October 24, 1984	ABC	
The Exchange Student	January 22, 1985	CBS	
The Adventures of a Two-Minute Werewolf	February 23-March 2, 1985	ABC	
High School Narc	December 4, 1985	ABC	
Getting Even: A Wimp's Revenge	March 19, 1986	ABC	
The Incredible Ida Early	May 29, 1987	NBC	
Read Between the Lines	June 3, 1987	ABC	
Song City USA; More Song City USA	September 1989	Direct-to-video	
Floor Time: Tuning In to Each Child	1990	Direct-to-video	
Riding the Magic School Bus with Joanna Cole and Bruce Degen	September 1992	Direct-to-video	
The Very Hungry Caterpillar and Other Stories	1993	Direct-to-video	U.S. version of The World of Eric Carle
Stellaluna	2003	Direct-to-video	

==== Films ====
Release date	Title	Notes
July 14, 1995	The Indian in the Cupboard	co-production with Paramount Pictures, Columbia Pictures, and The Kennedy/Marshall Company
August 18, 1995	The Baby-Sitters Club	co-production with Columbia Pictures and Beacon Pictures
October 9, 1998	The Mighty	co-production with Miramax Films
October 11, 2002	Tuck Everlasting	co-production with Walt Disney Pictures and Beacon Pictures
February 20, 2004	Clifford's Really Big Movie	co-production with Warner Bros. Pictures and Big Red Dog Productions
December 5, 2007	The Golden Compass	co-production with New Line Cinema and Ingenious Film Partners
October 16, 2015	Goosebumps	co-production with Columbia Pictures, Sony Pictures Animation, LStar Capital, Village Roadshow Pictures, and Original Film
October 12, 2018	Goosebumps 2: Haunted Halloween	co-production with Columbia Pictures, Sony Pictures Animation, Original Film, and Silvertongue Films
December 6, 2018	Mortal Engines	co-production with Universal Pictures, MRC, Silvertongue Films, Perfect World Pictures, and WingNut Films
April 4, 2020	You're Bacon Me Crazy	television movie; co-production with Hallmark Channel, Basset Hound Distribution, and Bar None Productions
November 10, 2021	Clifford the Big Red Dog	co-production with Paramount Pictures, Entertainment One, New Republic Pictures, and The Kerner Entertainment Company

== Book fairs ==
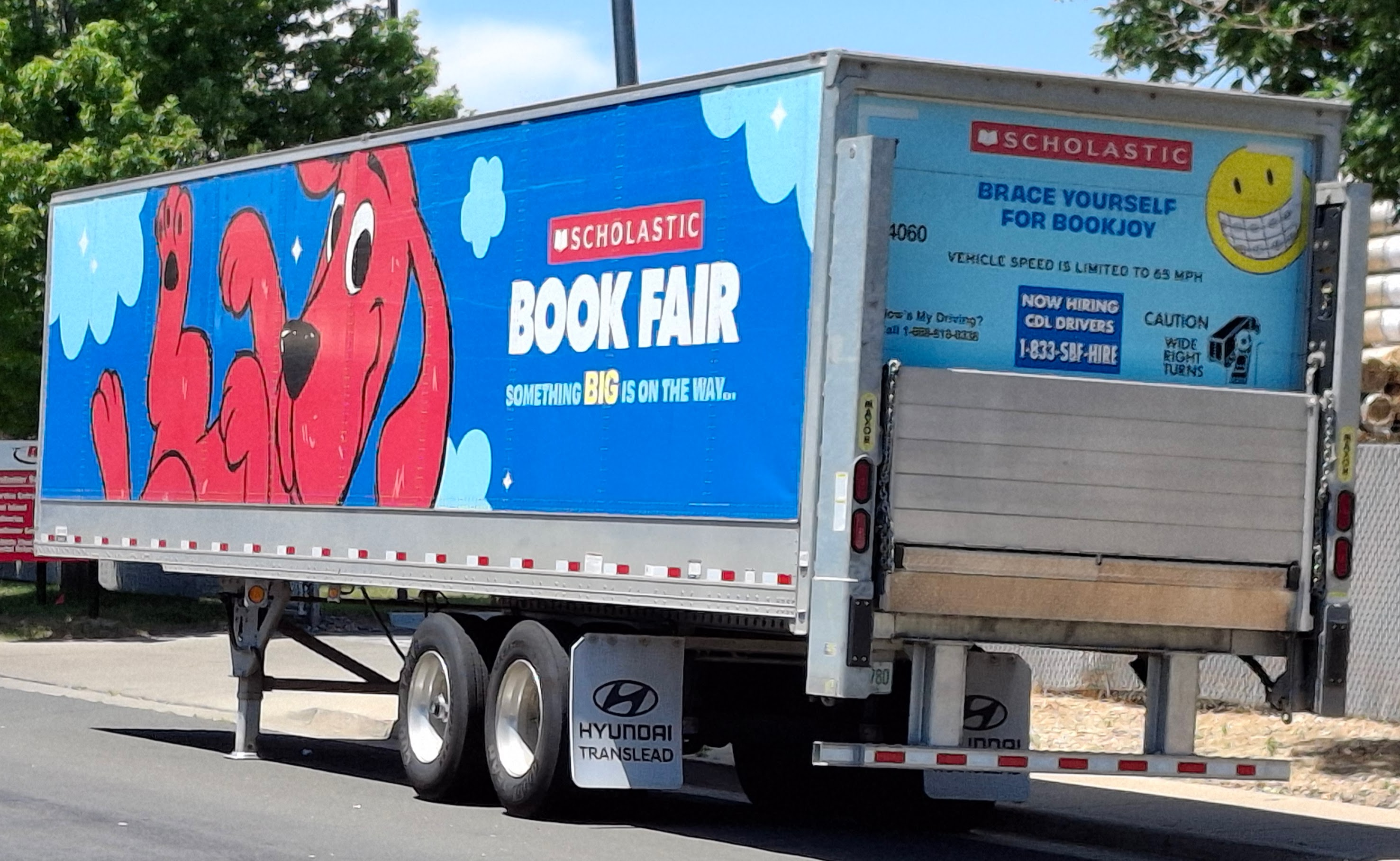
A trailer advertising the Scholastic Book Fair in Denver, July 2025

Scholastic Book Fairs began in 1981. Scholastic provides book fair products to schools, which then conduct the book fairs. Schools can elect to receive books, supplies and equipment or a portion of the proceeds from the book fair.

In the United States, during fiscal 2024, revenue from the book fairs channel ($541.6 million) accounted for more than half of the company's revenue in the "Total Children's Book Publishing and Distribution" segment ($955.2 million), and schools earned over $200 million in proceeds in cash and incentive credits.

In October 2023, Scholastic created a separate category for books dealing with "race, LGBTQ and other issues related to diversity", allowing schools to opt out of carrying these types of books. Scholastic defended the move, citing legislation in multiple states seeking to ban books dealing with LGBTQ issues or race. After public backlash from educators, authors, and free speech advocacy groups, Scholastic reversed course, saying the new category will be discontinued, writing: "It is unsettling that the current divisive landscape in the U.S. is creating an environment that could deny any child access to books, or that teachers could be penalized for creating access to all stories for their students". Scholastic Book Fairs have been criticized for spurring unnecessary purchases, highlighting economic inequality among students, and disruption of school activities and facilities.

== Book clubs ==
Scholastic book clubs are offered at schools in many countries. Typically, teachers administer the program to the students in their own classes, but in some cases, the program is administered by a central contact for the entire school. Within Scholastic, Reading Clubs is a separate unit (compared to, e.g., Education). Reading clubs are arranged by age/grade. Book club operators receive "Classroom Funds" redeemable only for Scholastic Corporation products.

== 2025 data breach ==
In January 2025, claims of a data breach affecting Scholastic came from a "furry" hacker identified as "Parasocial." The breach affected an estimated 8 million customers consisting of names, email addresses, phone numbers, and home addresses. The breach was provided to Have I Been Pwned? in an effort to inform customers.

== See also ==
- Books in the United States
- List of English-language book publishing companies
