= The Search Series =

- Genre: Educational
- Developer: Tom Snyder Productions
- Publisher: McGraw-Hill Education
- Platforms: Apple II, TRS-80
- First release: Geography Search
- Latest release: Archaeology Search

The Search Series is a five-game series of educational video games by Tom Snyder Productions and published by McGraw-Hill Education in 1980. It runs on either Apple II or TRS-80 Models I and III.

== Development ==
In the late 1970s, Snyder had bought a TRS-80 computer and began designing educational simulations on it. He hired a consultant for $500 a day to observe whether his creations had value. The consultant saw something special and won Snyder a contract McGraw-Hill, who bought all five packages immediately, forming The Search Series. Snyder went on the road in 1981 to promote the series.

=== Educational goals ===
The series exemplified Snyder's philosophy of keeping learning in the foreground of the gaming experience and encouraging players (recommended within the classroom) to work together in teams. The content was specifically designed to connect with curricula.

An example of the series is Geography Search, which simulates Christopher Columbus's discovery of the New World. Teams make navigational decisions based on information that is provided by and managed from the software.

== Gameplay ==
Players are given scenarios, then (ideally) divide up into teams to choose the next move their defending their position. They input their decisions into the simulation which then triggers the next stage.

== Titles ==
- Geography Search
- Geology Search
- Energy Search
- Community Search
- Archaeology Search

== Reception ==
Educational Values and Cognitive Instruction felt Geography Search was an excellent example of a computer-based situated learning environment based on a microworld. InfoWorld was impressed with the software, and deemed them a great way to explore simulations. In a piece for CNN, Henry F. Olds believed that the series had great power to stimulate students' thinking and problem-solving. Diagnostic Monitoring of Skill and Knowledge Acquisition felt that Geography Search was the "most ingenious" computer-based system for teaching history. The book Building Intelligent Interactive Tutors felt that as an open-ended learning environment (OLE), the software did not interact directly with the player and help them to manage the environment.

Compute!'s Gazette noted that the series was still selling well four years after its release.
