= Pfs:Write =

Word processing software

pfs:Write
- Splash screen for version 3.0 (1984)
- Developer: Software Publishing Corporation
- Initial release: 1983; 43 years ago
- Operating system: MS-DOS, Windows 3.0, Apple II
- Type: Word processor
- License: Proprietary software

pfs:Write is a word processor released by Software Publishing Corporation (SPC) in 1983 for IBM PC compatibles running MS-DOS and the Apple II. It includes the features common to most word processors of the day, including word wrapping, spell checking, copy and paste, underlining, and boldfacing, with a few advanced features, such as mail merge and some others. The software was easier to learn and to use than more expensive software with more features such as WordPerfect, Microsoft Word, and XyWrite.

== History ==
pfs:Write was announced in 1983 as part of a family of products released by SPC under the "pfs:" brand (Personal Filing System) which, when installed onto the same computer, combined to form a sort of office suite which included companion products pfs:File in 1980 (a database), pfs:Plan (a spreadsheet), pfs:Report in 1981 (reporting software), and pfs:Graph in 1982 (business graphics software). Other, mostly utilitarian products bearing the "pfs:" brand subsequently emerged, including pfs:Access (for data communications), pfs:Easy Start (a menuing utility), and pfs:Proof (a proofreading utility). Eventually, SPC offered a low- to mid-level desktop publishing product called pfs:Publisher, and it packaged the core word processing, database and spreadsheet products into a suite named pfs:Office.

A Windows 3.0 version, called Professional Write Plus 1.0, was released in 1991. The last version, Professional Write 3.0 for DOS, was released in 1994. A Windows version was available to registered users of PW 3.0.

== Lotus 1-2-3 integration ==
The market dominance of Lotus 1-2-3 encouraged SPC to allow its integration with pfs:Write. A user could use pfs:Write for word processing and link to Lotus 1-2-3 for spreadsheet use through the pfs menu system. Some setup was required, but as Lotus was deficient in word processing, this proved popular, especially among users already devoted to 1-2-3.

== Reception ==
InfoWorld in 1983 described PFS:Write as "inexpensive, simple to use and uncluttered by seldom-used features". The magazine approved of its ease of use ("If you can use a typewriter and know how to turn on your computer, you can use PFS:Write"), built-in help, good documentation, and ability to import data from spreadsheets and other PFS: software. InfoWorld concluded, "A word processor should allow you freedom of expression. This one can". Byte magazine in 1984 described pfs:Write 1.1 as "an elementary program for users who don't have time to major in word processing or who have basic needs". It cited "major deficiencies", however, including the inability to easily justify or delete text, poor printed and built-in documentation, and very slow file saving. PC Magazine in 1985 named pfs:Write and DisplayWrite 1 the Editor's Choice among six inexpensive word processors, approving the former's ease of use. The magazine in 1987 named pfs:Professional Write an Editor's Choice among low-cost word processors, stating that it added many features users of pfs:Write wanted. PC praised its ease of use, stating that the manual "is excellent, though much of it may be superfluous" because of pull-down menus and context-sensitive help.

II Computing in late 1985 listed pfs:Write fourth on the magazine's list of top Apple II non-game, non-educational software, based on sales and market-share data. A 1988 PC reader survey found that 4% used PFS:Professional Write. A 1990 American Institute of Certified Public Accountants member survey found that 6% of respondents used pfs:Write as their word processor.
