= FASTT Math =

- Developers: Tom Snyder Productions; Scholastic Corporation
- Publishers: Scholastic Corporation; Houghton Mifflin Harcourt
- Platforms: Windows iOS; Android
- Release: 2005
- Genre: Mathematics
- Mode: Single player

FASTT Math (acronym for Fluency and Automaticity through Systematic Teaching Technology) is a mathematic educational software developed and released by Scholastic Corporation in 2005. It was discontinued on May 1, 2019 after Adobe ceased support for its Flash Media Player, which the program relies on. Houghton Mifflin Harcourt (HMH) has replaced it with a similar math game program, Waggle.

== Design ==
The software comes in two variations one which is used by students and another used by teachers for managing and administering the program. The program gauges students understanding and fluency in math then provides linear instruction and assessments based on the student's skill. FASTT Math allows students to customize their interface based on unlocking different skins, based their skill level and proficiency in solving equations in the program's assessments.

The software encourages daily use and provides regular assessments to determine the users skill level which is then rewarded, and allows for further progression through the program. The default program provides users with one lesson per day, however does allow for alterations to the default regime by the program's administrative variation.

=== FASTT Math Next Generation ===
In 2012, Scholastic released an iPad based iOS app called Sushi Monster to serve as a preview for FASTT Math Next Generation, the app's features would test students on their mathematical knowledge in addition and multiplication.

After releasing the app, Houghton Mifflin Harcourt released the full official version of FASTT Math Next Generation, with expanded use for Android devices and computer, with a target audience of users ranging from grade 2 to grade 9. Along with its digital programs, FASTT Math Next Generation also created corresponding worksheets covering material from the digital program.

== Reception ==
In December 2011, Eastern Michigan University created an evaluation of FASTT Math based on a study conducted by the university to determine the effectiveness of FASTT Math in increasing student automaticity with equations. The study was conducted at two different primary schools, at the first school a fourth grade class was selected to use FASTT Math while the fifth and sixth grade classes stood as control groups, while the second school its fourth grade class was selected to be the control group while the fifth and sixth grade classes were selected to use FASTT Math.

The study found that the fourth grade control group that did not use FASTT Math showed more growth than the fifth and sixth grade students that did not use the FASTT Math program, by nearly eight facts on average. However sixth grade students that did use the FASTT Math program showed the most notable improvement out of the other tested groups that did use it.
