= Spinnaker Software =

American software company

Spinnaker Software Corporation
- Industry: Educational software
- Founded: April 1, 1982
- Defunct: 1994
- Fate: Merged
- Successor: The Learning Company
- Headquarters: Cambridge, Massachusetts, United States

Spinnaker Software Corporation was an American software and video game company. Founded in 1982 by Bill Bowman and C. David Seuss, it was known primarily for its line of non-curriculum-based educational software, which was a major seller during the 1980s.

Spinnaker pioneered the educational software market and was the first company to mass market low cost, educational software. It went public on NASDAQ in 1991 and was acquired by The Learning Company in 1994. The Learning Company was subsequently acquired by Mattel.

== Educational and entertainment titles ==
One of the key elements of the business plan was to change the marketing of software aimed at home users: Instead of plastic bags, the software was put into brightly colored, durable plastic boxes. To reach non-tech-savvy parents as potential buyers, full-color advertisements were run in magazines like Good Housekeeping, Better Homes and Gardens and Newsweek. The budget for advertising was huge: In 1983 $1.5 million were spent on advertising compared to sales of $11.1 million. By 1984 an industry rumor said that the company was running out of cash.

Robert Nason Baker of advertising agency Harold Cabot & Co., Boston designed the company logo and the multicoloured stripe that appeared on all printed material.

The initial lineup for Christmas 1982 comprised four titles: FaceMaker and The Story Machine, learning games by San Francisco-based DesignWare, and two Snooper Troops strategy games by Tom Snyder Productions.

Among the Spinnaker Software titles of 1983 were three programs designed and programmed by Interactive Picture Systems: Trains, Aerobics, and Grandma's House for Apple II, Atari 800 and Commodore 64 systems. A well-known product of 1983 was In Search of the Most Amazing Thing by Tom Snyder Productions.

Spinnaker's educational titles included such games as Alphabet Zoo and Kidwriter. Kidwriter, a storybook authoring tool and the first word processor ever designed and developed specifically for children, was created by Jim and Jack Pejsa, who also developed Movie Creator (licensed by Spinnaker to Fisher Price Corp.) an 8-track video and 3-track music production and editing workshop for children. Alphabet Zoo was produced by Dale Disharoon, a teacher from Chico, California.

By early 1984 InfoWorld estimated that Spinnaker was the world's 16th-largest microcomputer-software company, with $10 million in 1983 sales. During the 1983–1988 time frame, Spinnaker consistently led the best seller charts for educational software. with Snooper Troops making the top ten list of bestselling games.

=== Branding ===
Beginning in 1984, Spinnaker introduced several brands to structure its product line and target different audiences. Branding was intended to get Spinnaker more shelf space at retailers.

The first new product line was a collaboration with toy manufacturer Fisher-Price. Spinnaker was responsible for creating, marketing and distributing the software and paid royalties for using the Fisher-Price name.

In October 1984 Spinnaker founded two subsidiaries, the Telarium Corporation and the Windham Classics Corporation. Telarium was initially named "Trillium", but Spinnaker changed the name shortly after its announcement and before launch to Telarium when another company claimed ownership of the Trillium name. Both corporations published adventure games (interactive fiction) based on literature works. The target groups were different, Telarium geared toward grown-up adventure players and Windham Classics geared toward children players. In marketing and sales issues, both subsidiaries worked closely together with their parent company. President of Telarium was C. David Seuss. The game development was managed by Seth Godin. Telarium focused on prime quality text and published eight adventures, partly in cooperation with established writers like Michael Crichton, Byron Preiss, Ray Bradbury, and Arthur C. Clarke. Windham Classics focused on a nonviolent storyline appropriate for children and published five adventures.

By December 1984 Spinnaker had established seven product lines, with the Fisher-Price and Telarium/Windham Classics brands comprising more than ten titles each.

The Windham Classics corporation went defunct circa 1985–86 or later. The Telarium Corporation went defunct in 1987.

=== Leaving the market of educational software ===
In response to a severe, if temporary, downturn in consumer purchases of personal computers in the mid-to-late 1980s, and the shift in the market from more entertainment-oriented machines from Commodore and Atari toward more small business and personal productivity software running on IBM PC clones, Spinnaker decided to phase out its educational and entertainment titles and focus on personal productivity.

== Productivity software ==
In 1985 Spinnaker created the BetterWorking brand of productivity software for adults.

In 1990 Spinnaker bought Springboard, creator of Springboard Publisher and The Newsroom.

Spinnaker acquired the budget software house Power Up! Software in 1991, adding to its suite of budget business products. Power Up! Software was originally based in San Mateo, California, with the UK Head office in Mytchett, Surrey.

Spinnaker best seller during this time period was an integrated personal productivity application called "WindowWorks" which was an industry best seller, beating the Windows version of Microsoft Works to market by two years. WindowWorks was the first title ever bundled on a Compaq computer when it was selected to be included in the first price competitive Compaq released to a general public, as opposed to corporate market. WindowWorks and other Windows titles in the Betterworking series tripled Spinnaker's revenues and positioned it to acquire the pfs brand from SPC.

In January 1991 Spinnaker bought the PFS line of business applications from Software Publishing Corporation, creators of Harvard Graphics.

== Alumni ==
Employees of Spinnaker over the years included: Video executive Chris Deering, Network Associate's CEO Bill Larson, TV news producer Andrew Sugg, author Seth Godin, television personality Kevin O'Leary, and comedy writer John Bowman
