= I'm a Celebrity...Get Me Out of Here! (American TV series) =

U.S. TV series

- Genre: Reality television
- Created by: London Weekend Television (now part of ITV Studios)
- Based on: I'm a Celebrity...Get Me Out of Here!
- Presented by: Myleene Klass; Damien Fahey; John Lehr; Maura Higgins; Rob Rausch
- Country of origin: United States
- Original language: English
- No. of seasons: 2
- No. of episodes: 30

Production
- Production locations: Dungay, New South Wales, Australia (2003); Las Horquetas, Sarapiquí, Costa Rica (2009)
- Running time: 60–120 mins
- Production company: ITV America

Original release
- Network: ABC
- Release: February 19 – March 5, 2003
- Network: NBC
- Release: June 1 – June 24, 2009

I'm a Celebrity...Get Me Out of Here! (often referred to as I'm a Celebrity) is an American reality television series based on the British television show of the same name in which celebrities live in jungle conditions with few comforts.

== History ==
The series, broadcast on ITV since August 2002, is produced by ITV Studios (previously known as Granada Productions), a British company. The format was picked up by ABC soon after, which aired for one season in early 2003. The new series, shown on NBC in 2009, ran for 14 episodes, and followed the same format as the British version of the same show but was this time filmed in the mountainous area of Las Horquetas in Sarapiquí, Costa Rica. On March 8, 2010, NBC announced that there would not be a third season.

=== Revival series ===
On October 21, 2021, it was reported that ITV Studios subsidiary ITV America was pitching a reboot of the series under the title Celebrity Castle, with Blumhouse Productions—a studio known for its production of horror films—as co-producer. The pitch was reported to have been influenced by series 20 of the British version, which moved from Australia to Gwrych Castle in Wales due to COVID-19 travel restrictions. In 2023, it was revealed that plans for the proposed spin-off had not progressed beyond the pitching phase with ITV Studios now prioritising efforts into obtaining a new commission for the original jungle format.

In September 2026, it was announced that NBCUniversal's streaming service Peacock had ordered a reboot of the US version. Now titled Get Me Out of Here, it will be hosted by Maura Higgins and Rob Rausch, and is slated to premiere in 2027. In a change to previous seasons, the reboot will feature celebrities paired with a non-famous friend or family member. The winning team will receive a $100,000 grand prize.

== Series overview ==
Key:

King of the Jungle

Season	Start date	End date	Days in camp	Campmates	Honour places		
Season	Start date	End date	Days in camp	Campmates	Winner	Second place	Third place
1	February 19, 2003	March 5, 2003	15	10	Cris Judd	Melissa Rivers	John Melendez
2	June 1, 2009	June 24, 2009	24	13	Lou Diamond Phillips	Torrie Wilson	John Salley

== Main series results ==
Colour key
Winner
Runner-up
Third place
Left due to reasons other than eviction (walking out/illness etc)
Late arrival.

=== Season 1 (2003) ===
The first season had 10 contestants. It aired nightly from February 19, 2003, to March 5, 2003, on ABC. John Lehr was the host from the Australian outback. The time differential created serious issues with the live feed.

Celebrity	Fame	Entered	Exited	Finished
Cris Judd	Dancer & choreographer	Day 1	Day 15	1st
Melissa Rivers	Daughter of Joan Rivers	Day 1	Day 15	2nd
John Melendez	The Howard Stern Show lackey	Day 1	Day 15	3rd
Bruce Jenner (Note: Would later transition and be known as "Caitlyn Jenner" in 2015.)	Olympic decathlete	Day 1	Day 15	4th
Downtown Julie Brown	MTV VJ	Day 1	Day 14	5th
Tyson Beckford	Supermodel	Day 1	Day 13	6th
Nikki Schieler Ziering	Playboy model	Day 1	Day 12	7th
Maria Conchita Alonso	Singer & actress	Day 1	Day 11	8th
Alana Stewart	Model & actress	Day 1	Day 10	9th
Robin Leach	Television host	Day 1	Day 9	10th

=== Season 2 (2009) ===
NBC picked up the former ABC show. It aired for 14 episodes and followed the British show's format. The series premiered with a two-hour episode 8–10 PM EDT on June 1, 2009. It aired with a two-hour episode at 8–10 PM every Monday and at 8–9 PM Tuesday through Thursday until its June 24 finale. MTV subsequently showed a marathon (adding unaired footage and commentary from cast members) of the preceding week's episodes on Sundays. The location of the second season was the jungle of Costa Rica. Lou Diamond Phillips won in what was, according to Damien Fahey, a close vote between him and Torrie.

Celebrity	Fame	Entered	Exited	Finished
Lou Diamond Phillips	Stage & screen actor	Day 1	Day 24	1st
Torrie Wilson	WWE Diva	Day 1	Day 24	2nd
John Salley	NBA power forward	Day 1	Day 24	3rd
Patti Blagojevich	First Lady of Illinois	Day 1	Day 23	4th
Sanjaya Malakar	American Idol contestant	Day 1	Day 23	5th
Holly Montag	The Hills star	Day 8	Day 22	6th
Stephen Baldwin	Film & television actor	Day 1	Day 22	7th
Janice Dickinson	Supermodel	Day 1	Day 18	8th
Daniel Baldwin	Film & television actor	Day 3	Day 11	9th
Heidi Montag	The Hills star	Day 1	Day 8	10th
Spencer Pratt	The Hills star	Day 1	Day 8	11th
Frances Callier	Frangela comedian & actress	Day 1	Day 8	12th
Angela V. Shelton	Frangela comedian & actress	Day 1	Day 4	13th

== See also ==
- I'm a Celebrity...Get Me Out of Here! franchise
- I'm a Celebrity...Get Me Out of Here! (Australian TV series)
- I'm a Celebrity...Get Me Out of Here! (British TV series)
