= Holly Montag =

American executive and actress

Holly Wilson
- Born: Holly Montag; October 15, 1983 (age 42); Silver Spring, Maryland, U.S.
- Education: University of Colorado Boulder (BA)
- Occupations: Founder and CEO of Women's Recovery
- Years active: 2008–2010 (as actress)
- Television: The Hills; I'm a Celebrity...Get Me Out of Here!
- Spouse: Richie Wilson (m. 2014)
- Children: 1
- Relatives: Heidi Montag (sister)

Holly Wilson (née Montag; born October 15, 1983) is an American founder and CEO of an addiction rehabilitation center for women, and former television personality and actress. After moving to Los Angeles, California in 2008, Montag developed a supporting position on the reality television series The Hills, on which her younger sister Heidi Montag was a primary cast member. In 2009, she replaced Heidi and Heidi's husband Spencer Pratt on the second season of the American version of I'm a Celebrity...Get Me Out of Here!, both of whom had quit after generating controversy on the series. Holly placed sixth on the show.

== Early life and education ==
Montag was born in Silver Spring, Maryland. When she was four years old, her family moved to Crested Butte, Colorado.

After her parents were divorced, Montag's mother married Tim Egelhoff and they had a son, Sky. The Egelhoffs owned The Timberline restaurant in Crested Butte for twenty-one years until its closing in 2010.

Her father Bill Montag remarried to Terri O'Hara. Montag's step-brother Eric O'Hara died in 2008 after falling from an icy roof.

In 2002, she attended the University of Colorado Boulder on an academic scholarship and graduated with a bachelor's degree in film studies.

Montag moved to Los Angeles in 2008 to pursue a career in acting, writing and directing.

== Career ==
=== Television ===
In 2009, Montag was a contestant on the reality series I'm a Celebrity…Get Me out of Here! as a replacement for her sister Heidi Montag and brother-in-law Spencer Pratt.

=== Stage ===
In 2008, Montag appeared in the small stage production of Fame in Los Angeles. She began pursuing a career as a comedian in early 2010.

== Personal life ==
Montag married Richie Wilson in September 2014. They live in Boulder, Colorado. Montag is the founder and CEO of Women's Recovery, a women's drug and alcohol rehabilitation center in Colorado.

Montag and Wilson have one child, Isaiah Hawk Wilson born May 3, 2015.
