= Superficial (album) =

- Standard cover

Studio album by Heidi Montag
- Released: January 11, 2010
- Recorded: 2007–2009
- Genres: Electropop; dance-pop
- Length: 40:24
- Labels: Pratt, Warner
- Producers: Steve Morales; Chris Rojas; The Runners; Sebastian Jacome; Fingazz

Heidi Montag chronology
Superficial (2010)	Heidiwood (2025)

Singles from Superficial
- 1. "Look How I’m Doin" Released: April 1, 2009; 2. "Blackout" Released: May 19, 2009; 3. "Superficial" Released: November 23, 2009; 4. "I’ll Do It" Released: December 13, 2024

Superficial is the debut studio album by American television personality and singer Heidi Montag. It was released on January 11th, 2010, by Pratt Productions and Warner Music Group.

Montag rose to fame on the MTV reality television series The Hills, and despite lacking the backing of a major record label, embarked on her music career in 2007. She enlisted a number of notable writers and producers for the project, which is a pop album with lyrics that discuss topics including love, partying, and her reputation.

Superficial was initially met with a negative reaction from music critics. It sold an estimated 1,000 copies during its first week of release, and failed to impact any major music charts. Although it did appear on the Heatseekers album chart at 41. Montag attributed its initial failure to poor promotion and her public image. The album was preceded by the singles "Look How I’m Doin'," "Blackout," and the album's title track "Superficial". The promotional single "More Is More" charted on the US Dance Club Songs chart at 27, becoming her first Billboard chart entry.

The album has retrospectively received more positive reviews, with many critics suggesting that Montag's public image unfairly overshadowed the music. It became a cult classic among fans, and fourteen years after its release, the album track "I'll Do It" received a surge of streams and was officially released as the album's fourth single on December 13, 2024, after going viral on the video-sharing TikTok.

To celebrate the 15th anniversary of the album, an extended edition was released on January 11th, 2025, including remixes and recordings from the original sessions that didn't make the finalized track list. It was around this time, Montag and her family's home was destroyed by the Palisades Fire in 2025 and was shown on many news outlets, resulting in an outpouring of fan support resulting in the album's resurgence on sales and streaming platforms.

Many new observers began purchasing and streaming the album to show consolation, which resulted in the album debuting at 54 on the US Billboard 200, and number two on the US Top Dance Albums, with 15,000 album-equivalent units. The album also debuted at number 4 on the Top Album Sales chart, number 9 on the Independent Albums chart, and number 13 on the Catalog Albums chart.

Two singles from the album, "I'll Do It" and "Superficial" charted at numbers 5 and 9 on the Hot Dance/Pop Songs chart, marking her second and third songs to ever make a debut on any Billboard charts. Both songs also debuted at number 2 and 4 on the all-genre Digital Songs chart. The original version of the album, the single "Superficial", and both the original version of "I'll Do It" and the remix featuring Pitbull, all reached and remained at number one for some time on the main iTunes Store charts in several countries.

A digital reissue entitled Superficial 2: Heidiwood Edition was surprise released on January 24, 2025, and supplements the original track listing with a 12 track cut down tracklist of Montag's second studio album, Heidiwood (2025).

== Background ==
Montag first rose to fame as a cast member on the MTV television series The Hills. She gained further notoriety through her relationship with co-star Spencer Pratt, with the two gaining a reputation as "villains" in the media. With her career on the rise, Montag announced her intentions of recording a pop album. She explained her venture into music, stating "I always loved to sing. I was shy about that for a while, but I eventually started to open up about how I wanted to record an album. I knew I needed to start making moves." Prior to her rise to stardom, Montag's manager had begun laying down the groundwork for her to begin working on a pop-rock influenced album, though Montag insisted on a pop album. She cited artists such as Britney Spears and Janet Jackson as her main musical influences, claiming they made her want to be a pop star. Pratt, a talent manager who had managed Brody Jenner, was able to get Montag a meeting with Jenner's former step-father David Foster to speak about her potential music career. Following a meeting at Foster's recording studio in Miami, he agreed to work with Montag.

Though Montag had Foster's support, she was still an independent artist and funded the album with her own money. The album had a reported production cost that exceeded $2 million. Montag claimed that she had "gone broke" funding her music career. She and Pratt were responsible for finding and purchasing the majority of the songs on the album. Montag sought after writers and producers that had worked with big-name artists at the time, stating "I really just wanted that right sound, so I set the bar high. I wanted to work with people of that caliber." "One More Drink" was the first song that Montag recorded for the album. "Body Language" was the next song Montag recorded for the album. The song featured an un-credited rap verse from Pratt, and was ultimately Montag's first song to leak during the production of Superficial. She recorded songs such as "Higher" and "No More" during the early stages of the album's production, both of which would be released as promotional singles in 2008. Montag recorded a version of "Fashion", a song that was co-written and also recorded by singer Lady Gaga. She additionally recorded a song titled "Dramatic", which had initially been recorded by Britney Spears for her fifth studio album.

Montag began collaborating with producer Steve Morales and songwriter Cathy Dennis in 2009. Morales would go on to serve as the project's executive producer alongside Montag and Pratt. Though not included on the album, Morales also produced the final version of Montag's song "Body Language" (2009), released as a single months prior to the release of Superficial. Dennis has four writing credits on the finished product, including "Look How I'm Doing" and "Turn Ya Head". Montag recorded a track titled "Blackout" for the album that was written by Dennis and Taylor Momsen. Momsen claimed that she had written the song when she was only eight, and Dennis had made changes to the lyrics before allowing Montag to record it. Montag recorded the Morales produced "More Is More" after finding the demo to be "progressive and edgy", and enlisted Dave Audé to produce a remix of the song for use in night clubs. The song features a writing credit from singer Laura Pergolizzi, better known as LP. Pergolizzi has a total of six writing credits on the album, including "Twisted". Montag claimed that Pergolizzi was initially hesitant to let her record "Twisted", but agreed to let Montag have the song after hearing the completed version.

== Composition ==
Superficial is a primarily pop album. Pop singers such as Britney Spears and Jessica Simpson were cited as influences on the project. Montag stated throughout the album's production that her goal was to achieve a "fun, empowering mix that you could really dance to." She later told MTV, "Not every song is in the same genre. Some are more pop. Some are more ballady. Some are a little more rock. Some are a little bit edgier, but they all go together in some way." Superficial featured songs that spoke on topics such as fame, romance, and self-love. Montag cited her husband, whom she married during the album's production, as her inspiration when selecting the love songs.

The album opens with the Morales produced "Look How I'm Doing", a dance-pop song described as a "kiss-off to a former flame." Montag has also claimed the track speaks on her former friendship with Lauren Conrad. "Turn Ya Head" has been described as "electronic" and "urban-pop", as well as a "club anthem." The song's lyrics reference Montag drawing attention to herself on a dance floor. "Fanatic" is an 80's inspired mid-tempo song that speaks about being a fanatic for a lover. Montag related the song's lyrics to her feelings for Pratt, stating "I always was just such a fanatic for him, and it was just to fun to be able to sing a song that was so relatable to me in my own life." "Superficial" is the album's title track and fourth song, which acknowledges Montag's public image at the time with lyrics stating, "They say I'm superficial, but they really don't know me." "More Is More" is a dance track that sees Montag singing about dancing at a club and flirting with men. Similarly, "One More Drink" finds Montag telling a man from the club that she'll be going home with him after she has one more drink.

"Twisted", which was described as having a "rock" sound by Montag, called out someone who she labels as twisted. Montag has said she recorded the song in reference to Conrad. "Hey Boy" is an upbeat song that makes use of electric guitar, with Montag telling a man that he's "not the one" for her. She described the song as "feminist". The next track is "My Parade", a song which features the sounds of a marching band. The song seems to address those who dislike Montag, with her claiming they won't "rain on [her] parade". The song has themes of self-love and being confident. "Blackout" was seen as an ode to Montag's husband Spencer Pratt. "I'll Do It" has been labeled the "raciest" song on Superficial, with lyrics such as "come eat my panties off of me." Montag described the song, which speaks of fulfilling her lover's deepest fantasies, as empowering to women. The album closes with "Love It or Leave It", a mid-tempo song that has been described as having a "dark" beat. Having similar themes as "My Parade", this song sees Montag telling the listener they can "love it or leave it".

== Release and artwork ==
While still in production, numerous songs from the finished track list of Superficial were released as promotional singles. In 2008, a rough cut of "One More Drink" leaked online; the finished version had additional production work. "Look How I'm Doin'" was released as a promotional single on April 1, 2009. It was released alongside the song "Your Love Found Me", which was ultimately not included on the album. "More Is More" had a promotional remix album released to nightclubs on April 3, 2009. The album featured remixes from Ralphi Rosario and Dave Audé. The song became Montag's first Billboard chart entry when it debuted at number fifty on the Hot Dance Club Songs chart; it would go on to reach a peak of twenty-seven on the chart. Montag released the promotional Wherever I Am extended play on April 28, featuring the three promotional singles alongside the songs "Turn Ya Head" and "Party Is Wherever I Am". The version of "Look How I'm Doin'" present on the album featured an additional verse from a rapper credited as Machine Gun Kelly, not to be confused with another rapper of the same name.

"Blackout" was released as a promotional single on May 19. While on their honeymoon, Montag and Pratt filmed a homemade music video for the song that featured Montag in a hot tub and hammock. She released a second promotional extended play titled Here She Is... on August 4, 2009. The release compiled a number of Montag's promotional singles that had been released to that point. She next released a finished version of "Body Language" as a single on August 14. The song was initially intended to be included on Superficial, but was left off the finished product due to issues with the song sampling "Situation" (1982) by Yazoo. The album's title track, "Superficial", served as the album's final promotional single before its eventual release. The song was released on November 23, 2009. Montag and Pratt made a video for the song featuring footage from their life the past few years, releasing it in April 2010. Superficial was released to digital retailers through Pratt Productions and the Warner Music Group on January 11, 2010. The album is available in both a clean and explicit version, due to the song "More Is More".

Throughout the recording process, Superficial underwent a number of working titles. The project was initially intended to be self-titled, while titles such as The One and Independent were also announced online. Montag later confirmed the album's final title as Superficial, inspired by "the world [she lives] in" and her public perception. Montag revealed the album's original cover in November 2009, shot by Liz Ciganovich. The photo saw the singer in a polka-dot leotard posing in front of a wall of cassette tapes. The image, which drew inspiration from the music video for "Physical" (1981) by Olivia Newton-John, paid homage to the music scene of the 1980s "when you just had to run out to the record store and get your favorite album", according to Montag. Prior to the album's release, Montag changed the album's cover to an image of her in a short black dress posing in front of a camera lens. Ciganovich photographed the updated album cover as well.

== Critical reception ==
Upon its release, Superficial was met with a negative reaction from music critics. The Channel Magazine also gave the album a negative review, more specifically the lyrical content, writing "Montag sings about these ideas: how hard it is to handle the paparazzi, how she turns heads everywhere she goes, and how she ignores those that rain on her parade." Grace Carroll of Gigwise gave the album a negative review in 2013, comparing Montag to a "low budget Britney Spears wannabe" and commenting "Heidi's empty, dead-behind-the-eyes vocals manage to stick the pin into every inflated balloon of a track."

LimeLife did call some songs on the album "catchy", but said the project "sounds so manufactured, I have no idea what Heidi would sound like without all this technology behind her." Hollywood Life also gave the album a mixed review; while praising "My Parade" and "I'll Do It", they wrote "Superficial is just as over-produced as you'd expect a Heidi album to be. In fact, there are some points when you can barely hear Heidi's breathy words over busy beats and sporadic whooshing sounds." In a more positive review, LGBT themed website Homorazzi praised "Fanatic", the title track, and "More Is More" as standout songs on the album. Bradley Stern with MuuMuse described the album as "fun", and listed several songs from the project as "guilty pleasures."

Since its release, Superficial has gone on to develop somewhat of a cult following. Pop artist Slayyyter cited the album as an influence to her own music, claiming "There's a whole SoundCloud circuit of artists that are just like me and worship [Superficial] and take our influence from there." Sam Lansky of Idolator wrote an article in 2012 "in defense" of the album, claiming it was "good in the way that the best trash-pop always is, the songs that you dance to in the darkened cloisters of a nightclub not knowing who's singing". An article in Life & Style in 2018 called it the "most underrated album of all time", and argued that Montag's public image at the time eclipsed the album. PAPER listed Superficial in their Top 10 Albums of 2010s rating in 2019. Montag's husband has cited Montag's controversial decision to undergo ten cosmetic surgeries just prior to the album's release as a potential reason the album did not perform well with critics or listeners.

== Commercial performance ==
Superficial was reported to have sold just over 1,000 copies in its first week of release. It debuted at number forty-one on the Top Heatseekers album chart in the United States, marking its only chart appearance. There were a total of 6,000 paid downloads of the album's tracks during the first week of release. Montag has since attributed the album's commercial performance to a lack of promotion on her part during its release period, and would later claim that MTV had refused to promote her music career due to her role on The Hills.

In January 2025, following the destruction of Montag's home and belongings in the Palisades Fire in Los Angeles, fans organized to show support to Montag by streaming Superficial. The album debuted at number 54 on the Billboard 200 with 15,000 album-equivalent units.

== Legacy ==
The album has been received positively in the years since its release, with many praising it as a great dance album. In 2023, a sped-up version of "I'll Do It" went viral on TikTok, being used in thousands of videos on the platform and climbing to five million plays on Spotify by February. Lukas Heerich and Ludovic de Saint Sernin selected it to play while Irina Shayk walked the catwalk during de Saint Sernin's AW23 fashion show during Paris Fashion Week. Pop singer Slayyyter has cited the song as an inspiration.

The positive reception of the album a little less than a decade and a half later inspired Montag to release several of her older songs from the vault. "Bad Boy" was released on 8 December 2023, while "Touch Me" was released on 26 January 2024.

== Track listing ==
Standard edition
No.	Title	Writer(s)	Length
1.	"Look How I'm Doin'"	Steve Morales; Cathy Dennis; Raymond Diaz; Laura Pergolizzi	3:28
2.	"Turn Ya Head"	Morales; Dennis; Keithin Pittman	3:37
3.	"Fanatic"	Dennis; Chris Rojas; Kool Kojak	3:25
4.	"Superficial"	Morales; Atozzio Towns; Harold St. Louis	3:08
5.	"More Is More"	Morales; Pergolizzi; St. Louis	3:05
6.	"One More Drink"	Mary Brown; Andrew Harr; Jermaine Jackson; Dawn Richard	3:37
7.	"Twisted"	Sebastian Jacome; Pergolizzi	3:48
8.	"Hey Boy"	Jacome; Pergolizzi	2:54
9.	"My Parade"	John Stary; Ben McCrary; Melanie Dayan	3:23
10.	"Blackout"	Dennis; Rojas; Taylor Momsen	3:29
11.	"I'll Do It"	Morales; Stacy Barthe; Pittman; Pergolizzi	3:30
12.	"Love It or Leave It"	Jacome; Pergolizzi	3:00
Total length:			40:30

Anniversary Edition digital release bonus tracks
No.	Title	Writer(s)	Length
13.	"Body Language" (featuring Spencer Pratt)	Evan Kidd Bogart; David Quiñones; Joacim Persson; Niclas Molinder; David Jassy	3:36
14.	"Overdosin"	Dave Young	3:45
15.	"No More"	Young	4:02
16.	"Fashion"	Stefani Germanotta; Nādir Ḵayyāṭ	2:55
17.	"Your Love Found Me"	Hope Hazy	3:53
18.	"Bad Boy"	Daniel Luttrell; Marianna Ricco	3:18
19.	"Party Is Wherever I Am"	Mischke Butler; Theron Feemster; Dejuan Turrentine	3:30
20.	"Touch Me"	Heidi Montag; Kara DioGuardi	3:58
21.	"Heartbeat"	KeAna Pratt; Kenneth Edward Pratt	3:55
22.	"Sex Ed"	Rojas; Pergolizzi	3:16
23.	"Trash Me"	Jessie Malakouti; Johan Fransson; Tim Larsson; Tobias Lundgren	3:05
24.	"One More Drink" (Remix)	Brown; Harr; Jackson; Richard	3:18
25.	"Blackout" (Remix)	Dennis; Rojas; Momsen	3:55
26.	"Superficial" (Dextreau Remix)	Towns; King; Louis	2:22
27.	"Touch Me" (Remix)	Montag; DioGuardi	3:56
28.	"Fanatic" (Dextreau Remix)	Dennis; Rojas; Kojak	2:26
29.	"No More" (Remix)	Young	3:24
Total length:			95:25

Superficial 2: Heidiwood Edition
No.	Title	Writer(s)	Length
13.	"Thank Me"	Alexandra Veltri; Dallas Caton	2:17
14.	"Heidiwood" (featuring Chase Icon)	Chase Icon	2:11
15.	"Prototype"	Veltri; Andrew Okamura; Veronica Wyman	2:25
16.	"Screensaver"	Veltri; Caton; Benicio Bryant	2:21
17.	"Under Your Clothes"	Veltri; Caton; Alex Chapman	2:14
18.	"Sriracha"	Simon Wilcox; Sizzy Rocket; Lyndsey Gunnulfsen	1:59
19.	"Top"	Cedric de Saint-Rome; Sophie Rose	2:31
20.	"Tetris"	Rocket; Rollo Spreckley	2:03
21.	"Flash"	Veltri; Caton; Marky Style	1:53
22.	"Forgive and Forget"	Montag; Cali Rodi; Jordyn Kane; Aaron Blackmar	3:22
23.	"Bad Publicity"	Rodi; GG Ramirez; Jacob Munk	2:21
24.	"America's Sweetheart"	Rodi; Kane; Blackmar	2:36
Total length:			1:00:08

Notes

- "Body Language" contains an interpolation of "Situation" (1982), written by Alison Moyet and Vince Clarke, as performed by Yazoo.
- "Fashion" is a cover of "Fashion" (2009), written by Stefani Germanotta and Nadir Khayat, and performed by Lady Gaga.
- "Bad Boy" contains an interpolation of "Mickey" (1981), written by Michael Chapman and Nicholas Chinn, and performed by Toni Basil.

== Personnel ==
Credits adapted from the liner notes of Superficial.

- Dan Black – legal
- Ken Burry – legal
- Ariel Chobaz – engineering
- Liz Ciganovich – art direction, LP cover design, production design
- Laura DeMichele – legal
- Cathy Dennis – songwriter
- Fingazz – producer
- Bernie "Big Bass" Gardner – mastering
- Sebastian Jacome – producer
- Jaycen Joshua – mixing
- Chris Leach – packaging
- Peter Lopez – legal
- Manny Marroquin – mixing
- Steve Morales – producer, engineering
- Jordan Nuttall – photography
- Dave Pemado – mixing
- Chris Rojas – producer
- The Runners – producer
- Casey Ryder – LP cover design, LP logo design

== Charts ==
Chart (2010)	Peak position
US Heatseekers Albums (Billboard)	41

Chart (2025)	Peak position
UK Albums Sales (OCC)	74
US Billboard 200	54
US Independent Albums (Billboard)	9
US Top Dance Albums (Billboard)	2
