= Dorothea Gillim =

American TV producer (born 1964)

- Born: July 18, 1964 (age 62); Cambridge, Massachusetts, U.S.
- Education: Swarthmore College; Harvard Graduate School of Education
- Occupation: Television producer
- Years active: 2003–present
- Known for: Producing animated series
- Television: WordGirl; Molly of Denali; Pinkalicious & Peterrific; Hey Monie!; Curious George; Time Warp Trio
- Awards: Peabody Award; Daytime Emmy Award for Outstanding Children's Animated Program

Dorothea Gillim (born July 18, 1964) is an American television producer. She is the creator of the animated series WordGirl and Hey Monie! and co-creator of Molly of Denali. Under GBH, Gillim has produced multiple animated series including Curious George, Pinkalicious & Peterrific, and Time Warp Trio.

In 2006, Gillim created WordGirl to respond to "the idea that children's television wasn't intelligent enough," feeling that most shows "underestimated their sense of humor and their intellect." In 2022, Collider praised the show for its "non-white, little girl superhero" protagonist, claiming it started a female superhero trend and the generation who grew up watching WordGirl later demanded new and diverse Marvel heroes such as Captain Marvel.

Gillim's co-created animation series Molly of Denali has been celebrated as "the nation's first widely distributed children's program featuring an Alaska Native as the lead character."

== Career ==
After graduating from Swarthmore College, Gillim was a fifth grade teacher in Philadelphia for three years before leaving to attend graduate school. She took interest in television writing following a media education course at Harvard Graduate School of Education.

Her 2003 adult animation series Hey Monie! was praised for its improvised comedic dialogue and for featuring Angela V. Shelton as Monie, the show's African-American female protagonist.

In 2019, Tuca & Bertie creator Lisa Hanawalt mentioned Gillim's show Hey Monie! while compiling a list of adult animated shows created by women.

In 2022, regarding her co-creation of Molly of Denali, Gillim described the show as "long overdue" and stated, "We knew that this story was not ours to tell, and so our intention was to partner with Alaska Natives in the development of the characters in the world." NPR commended the show for debunking stereotypes, addressing discrimination, and presenting an educational representation of Alaskan Native culture.

== See also ==
- Susie Lewis, contemporaneous creator of adult animated sitcom Daria
- Pam Brady, creator of adult animated sitcom Neighbors from Hell
- Loren Bouchard, creator of other Soup2Nuts shows including Home Movies
