= Hey Monie! =

American adult animated sitcom

- Genre: Animated sitcom; Slice of life; Comedy; Black sitcom; Adult animation
- Created by: Dorothea Gillim
- Voices of: Angela V. Shelton; Frances Callier
- Country of origin: United States
- Original language: English
- No. of seasons: 3
- No. of episodes: 25

Production
- Running time: 11 minutes
- Production company: Soup2Nuts

Original release
- Network: Oxygen; BET
- Release: March 4 – April 15, 2003

Related
- Dr. Katz, Professional Therapist; Home Movies; O'Grady

Hey Monie! is an American adult animated sitcom produced by Soup2Nuts. It features heavily improvised dialogue by the Second City cast, similarly to Soup2Nuts animated sitcom Home Movies.

Its creator and executive producer was Dorothea Gillim, creator of WordGirl, who also produced animated series Curious George, Pinkalicious & Peterrific, Molly of Denali, and Time Warp Trio.

The show began as 5-minute shorts that were part of Oxygen's animation series X-Chromosome. It achieved 11-minute episodes Hey Monie! aired on BET and, afterward, on Oxygen in 2003. It was BET's first in-house animated series; BET stated that it followed "the tradition of entertaining and satirical animated programming like The Simpsons, The Critic, and Daria."

In 2003, Seattle PI described the series as "smart, and at times wickedly funny."

It was the only adult animated series to feature a Black woman as its protagonist until Oh My God... Yes! A Series of Extremely Relatable Circumstances which ran for one season on Adult Swim in 2025.

== Plot ==
Simone a.k.a. "Monie" (Angela V. Shelton), is a publicist at a PR agency in Chicago. She lives in an apartment building with her best friend, Yvette (Frances Callier). The show chronicles her life living as a single career woman in the big city.

== Cast ==
The series protagonists are voiced by the improv comedy Frangela duo, who are real-life best friends.

- Angela V. Shelton as Monie
- Frances Callier as Yvette
- Melissa Bardin Galsky as Robin
- Dean Edwards
- Sam Seder
- H. Jon Benjamin as a self-defense instructor
- Brendon Small as Chad
- Oprah Winfrey as herself

== Legacy ==
Hey Monie! was not released on DVD; this may explain its multiple half-hour lost episodes. This also may explain why Hey Monie! did not amass a fandom as numerous as that of Home Movies; creator Brendon Small has attributed Home Movies' DVD release "for its increased popularity and cult following."

A 2004 SFGate article lamented the previous year's cancellation of Hey Monie!, as the show positively impacted diversity on television. That year, the show was recommended in self-help book Beautylicious!

In 2006, television scholar Amanda D. Lotz praised the show's cast for bringing "an authentic feel to the show's language and dialogue."

In 2016, Bustle described the show as a feminist cartoon "way before its time and gone way too soon." That year, the show was listed in Vibe's "Forgotten Laughs: 9 Black Shows You Missed Out On."

In 2018, Flood Magazine interviewed show creators and stars about the show, although series creator Gillim "was astonished that she was contacted for an interview for this piece, based on how little updated information about the show is available online." Once it was cancelled, Shelton and Callier stated "the show's momentum halted when executives got involved, hiring a white writer—without consulting either of them—to pen the final episodes." These episodes are now lost due to a lack of DVD release.

In 2019, Tuca & Bertie creator Lisa Hanawalt mentioned the show while compiling a list of adult animated shows created by women.

== See also ==
- Home Movies, an animated sitcom, also by Soup2Nuts
- O'Grady, a teen animated sitcom, also by Soup2Nuts
