= Heidi Montag =

American television personality and singer (born 1986)

- Montag in 2026
- Born: Heidi Blair Montag; September 15, 1986 (age 40); Crested Butte, Colorado, U.S.
- Other name: Heidi Pratt
- Occupations: Reality television personality; singer
- Years active: 2004–present
- Political party: Republican
- Spouse: Spencer Pratt (m. 2008)
- Children: 2
- Relatives: Holly Montag (sister); Stephanie Pratt (sister-in-law)

Heidi Blair Pratt (née Montag; born September 15, 1986) is an American reality television personality and singer. In 2006, Montag was cast in the MTV reality television series The Hills, which chronicled the personal and professional lives of Lauren Conrad, Montag, and friends Audrina Patridge and Whitney Port. During its production, she briefly attended the Fashion Institute of Design & Merchandising and was employed by event planning company Bolthouse Productions. As the series progressed, Montag began dating fellow cast member Spencer Pratt, which ultimately ended her friendship with Conrad. Their ensuing feud became the central focus of the series and was carried through each subsequent season.

The couple, jointly nicknamed "Speidi", married in November 2008, with a second wedding ceremony held months later in April 2009. Later that year, they made appearances on the second season of the American version of I'm a Celebrity...Get Me Out of Here! In January 2010, Montag released her debut studio album Superficial; it was critically panned and commercially unsuccessful at the time, failing to earn back the money she spent making it.

Montag received widespread criticism after undergoing ten cosmetic surgery procedures in one day. In 2011, Montag was featured on the television series Famous Food, where she and several celebrities competed for a restaurant partnership. Two years later, she and Pratt competed as a single entity on the eleventh series of the British version of Celebrity Big Brother, and returned to the series with Pratt as an All-Star for Celebrity Big Brother 19. Montag released her second studio album, Heidiwood on May 30, 2025, and on June 26, 2026, she released her third studio album, Masterpiece.

== Life and career ==
=== 1986–2005: Early life ===
Heidi Blair Montag was born September 15, 1986, in Crested Butte, Colorado, to German American parents Darlene (née Seiden) and Bill Montag. After divorcing, her mother Darlene married Tim Egelhoff; they owned The Timberline restaurant for 21 years until its closing in 2010. Montag has an older sister Holly, also a reality television personality, and a younger brother Sky. Their father Bill later married Terri O'Hara; their step-brother Eric O'Hara died in 2008 after an accidental fall from an icy roof.

After graduating from high school, Montag moved to California and attended the Academy of Art University in San Francisco for one semester. During freshman orientation, she befriended Lauren Conrad, who at the time was a primary cast member of the MTV reality television series Laguna Beach: The Real Orange County. After both transferred to the Fashion Institute of Design & Merchandising in Los Angeles, California, Montag was subsequently featured in four episodes during the series' second season. However, after failing to find the school "challenging", she dropped out and received employment from Bolthouse Productions as an assistant. Though later interviews with Montag revealed that the position at Bolthouse was all a set up for The Hills and she was never promoted.

=== 2006–2010: The Hills and Superficial ===
After moving to Los Angeles in 2006, the Laguna Beach spin-off series The Hills was developed to chronicle the lives of then-housemates Conrad and Montag and friends Audrina Patridge and Whitney Port. That year, she began a short-lived relationship with Jordan Eubanks; she described its end as "the best decision of [her] life". By the second season, Montag and Conrad's friendship had deteriorated after the former began dating and later moved in with Spencer Pratt. During the third season, Conrad ended her friendship with Montag after she suspected that Pratt was responsible for rumors of a sex tape involving her and her former boyfriend Jason Wahler; the ensuing feud carried through each subsequent season.

In August, she entered the music industry and began recording her debut studio album. Later that month, the song "Body Language" was leaked on the internet, and featured an uncredited rap verse from Pratt. The following month, she confirmed to Us Weekly that she had undergone a breast augmentation and rhinoplasty five months prior. Montag's first promotional single and its accompanying music video "Higher" were released in February 2008.

Later that same month, she appeared on the cover of Maxim. Montag collaborated with Anchor Blue to launch her first clothing line "Heidiwood" in April. Her contract was not renewed the following year after the company decided against featuring celebrity endorsements in future advertising.

After several additional unauthorized leaks, Montag enlisted songwriter Cathy Dennis to continue work on her album. She released her first two extended plays Wherever I Am and Here She Is... in 2009. The former included the song "More Is More"; debuting at number 50 on the US Billboard Hot Dance Club Songs chart, it became her first and only song to chart in the country. Later that year, she and Pratt appeared on the second season of the American version of I'm a Celebrity...Get Me Out of Here! in support of the "Feed the Children" foundation. They quit after Montag was hospitalized with a gastric ulcer and later created controversy after alleging that they were subject to torture during production. After leaving the series, Montag and Pratt became notorious for their antics and antagonistic roles, notably during an interview with Al Roker of Today, and were described as "everything that's wrong with America". In August, she performed her first official single, the finished version of "Body Language", at the Miss Universe 2009; her appearance was met with a negative critical response, who criticized its overall production. The following month, she appeared on the cover of Playboy. In November, Montag and Pratt released the book How to Be Famous: Our Guide to Looking the Part, Playing the Press, and Becoming a Tabloid Fixture.

In January 2010, Montag revealed to People that she had undergone ten cosmetic surgery procedures in a single day two months prior, performed by Frank Ryan. Among the procedures were brow-lifts, ear-pinnings, a chin reduction, as well as a second rhinoplasty and second breast augmentation. She commented that she almost died from too much Demerol, reducing her heart rate to five beats per minute. Her debut studio album Superficial was digitally released later that month to an overwhelmingly negative critical response from critics. The self-funded record cost nearly $2 million and sold approximately 1,000 copies in first-week downloads, failing to earn back the money spent making it. In May, she and Pratt made their final appearance on The Hills halfway through the sixth and final season.

=== 2010–2018: Later career ===
After her exit from The Hills, Montag auditioned for the replacement of Megan Fox in the third installment of the Transformers series, but was ultimately not featured in the film. In June 2010, she and producer Steve Morales commenced work on her unreleased second studio album. The following month, Montag filed for divorce from Pratt, citing irreconcilable differences in the petition. However, they called it off in September after confessing that the action was intended to boost Montag's ailing career. In November, they renewed their vows in Carpinteria, California. In February 2011, Montag made her feature film debut as Kimberly in Just Go with It. Later that year, she appeared on the VH1 reality television series Famous Food, where she competed against other celebrities for a partnership stake in a restaurant in which they worked to open. In October, Montag began writing a memoir. The following year, she released her third extended play Dreams Come True.

In January 2013, Montag and Pratt as a single entity competed as housemates on the eleventh series of the British version of Celebrity Big Brother, where they notably developed a minor feud with singer and television personality Rylan Clark. They were named the runners-up, losing to Clark. On February 18, Channel 5 aired a one-off television special discussing Montag and Pratt's rise to prominence, titled Speidi: Scandal, Secrets & Surgery!. Later that year, they launched the Speidi Show, which was initially assumed to be a web series in which the couple used a different reality television format for each installment. However, the project was later revealed to be an example of networked improv narrative, where Montag and Pratt collaborated with Mark Marino and Rob Wittig to create a Twitter game in which players Live Tweet an imaginary show. In October 2013, Montag revealed that her original F-cup breast implants resulted in severe health issues, and underwent a breast reduction surgery to replace them with D-cup implants. In December 2013, Montag stated that she and Conrad have "talked a few times" since the series' conclusion, elaborating that "it's unfortunate things happened the way that it did, but we're both different people now, older and more mature."

However, in 2015, Montag angrily excoriated Conrad when she appeared on Marriage Boot Camp, during a sequence where the contestants were asked to forgive someone who had hurt them in the past; Montag told a stand-in for Conrad that Conrad had "ruined my life with her lies", said that Conrad DID have a sex tape and had falsely blamed it on her, and that she "forgave" Conrad for being terrible and trying to ruin her life. Montag was universally lambasted for bringing up the sex tape lies anew, parroting the views of Pratt (who Conrad actually blamed for spreading the false rumors; Conrad felt Montag knew he was lying but took Pratt's side because she loved him) and trying to use Conrad's name to get publicity for herself. She and Pratt appeared in the television special After Shock: Heidi & Spencer, which premiered on December 9, 2013, on E!, during which they admitted that many of the situations they were involved with in the various reality series they starred on were in fact made up by the shows producers. Montag and Pratt later appeared on an episode of Celebrity Wife Swap in June 2014, for which they swapped with Olympic athlete Amanda Beard and her husband Sacha Brown. In October 2015, Montag and her husband made several media appearances that were largely devoted to two subjects: claiming that their image as terrible people stemming from The Hills was not factual and, somewhat divergently, their intense dislike of Lauren Conrad, which included Montag's husband admitting he spread rumors (which Montag said were true but have never been proven) that Conrad made a sex tape with a former boyfriend. Montag also claimed she had been paid to remain Conrad's friend during her time on the show, while also adding she had reconciled with her family to her husband's displeasure.

In 2017, Montag re-entered the Celebrity Big Brother with her husband. On day 18 the couple were eternally nominated by James Cosmo, which they did not have a good reaction to. They were saved in an 8-person eviction on day 22 however, they were evicted on day 25 against Kim Woodburn, Jessica Cunningham, Bianca Gascoigne and Jedward. Montag and Pratt were reunited with their rival, Rylan Clark-Neal, on Big Brother's Bit on the Side that night.

=== 2019–present: The Hills: New Beginnings and return to music ===
At the 2018 MTV Video Music Awards, MTV announced a reboot of The Hills entitled The Hills: New Beginnings, slated to premiere in 2019. Montag was announced as part of the cast of the new series. The series premiered on June 24 and later got renewed for a second season. While filming, Montag started working on new music and released a Christian pop single titled "Glitter and Glory".

In 2023, "I'll Do It" from Montag's debut studio album Superficial went viral on TikTok. Following the success of the song, she released the song as the fourth single from the album. Due to the song gaining traction, Montag expressed her desire to return to the music industry and released her comeback single "Wet Hot Summer" on June 28, 2024. On November 12, 2024, Montag released "Fashion" as a promotional single. The song was originally supposed to be released in 2009 with songwriting credits from Lady Gaga and RedOne, in which they both initially allowed her to release her version of the song. Montag's version then leaked and received negative reviews from critics, which then led to Gaga releasing the song, which was featured on the soundtrack for the 2009 film Confessions of A Shopaholic.

Due to losing her home in the LA fires, in January 2025; a decade after its original release, Montag's album Superficial, topped the iTunes music charts in the United States, Australia, New Zealand, Canada, Sweden, Norway, the Netherlands, and Oman. On January 12, 2025, Superficial ranked number one in the United States.

In 2026, Montag competed in season fourteen of The Masked Singer as "Snow Cone". Spencer Pratt appeared in the background of the performances as a snow cone-headed character who was later identified as "Mr. Snow Cone". As Montag was eliminated on "Spice Girls Night", Pratt took over the unmasking duties of the Men in Black before unmasking himself.

== Personal life ==
During the fourth season of The Hills, Montag and Pratt eloped to Mexico, where they married in November 2008. A wedding ceremony was held in April 2009 in Pasadena, California. Their first son, Gunner Stone, was born in October 2017. She gave birth to their second son, Ryker Pratt, in November 2022.

On January 7, 2025, Heidi and Spencer lost their home in the Pacific Palisades fire.

Montag is a registered Republican. She supported John McCain's 2008 presidential campaign, and supported Sarah Palin, stating "Sarah Palin will do well. She is such a strong, independent woman. I'm her biggest fan."

== Filmography ==
Year	Title	Role	Notes
Television
2005	Laguna Beach: The Real Orange County	Herself	Recurring cast member (season 2)
2006–2010	The Hills	Herself	Main cast member (season 1–6)
2009	How I Met Your Mother	Herself	Guest appearance alongside Spencer Pratt (season 4)
2009	I'm a Celebrity...Get Me Out of Here!	Herself	Contestant alongside Spencer Pratt (season 2)
2011	Famous Food	Herself	Contestant (season 1)
2013	Celebrity Big Brother 11	Herself	Housemate with Spencer Pratt; Runner-up
2013	Speidi: Scandals, Secrets and Surgery	Herself	Documentary with Spencer Pratt
2013	After Shock: Heidi & Spencer	Herself	Documentary with Spencer Pratt
2014	Celebrity Wife Swap	Herself	Contestant alongside Spencer Pratt (season 3)
2015	Marriage Boot Camp: Reality Stars 2	Herself	Contestant alongside Spencer Pratt (season 4)
2016	The Mother/Daughter Experiment: Celebrity Edition	Herself	Main cast member with her mother Darlene Egelhoff (season 1)
2017	Celebrity Big Brother 19	Herself	Housemate with Spencer Pratt; 9th place
2019–2021	The Hills: New Beginnings	Herself	Main cast member
2020	Very Cavallari	Herself	Episode: "Just Like the Old Days"
2020	Celebrity Family Feud	Herself	Season 7, episode 4
2026	The Masked Singer	Snow Cone	Season 14; 3 episodes
Film
2011	Just Go with It	Kimberly	End scene
2020	Assassin 33 A.D.	Diane	
2021	Black Easter	Diane	
2023	Senior Year: Love Never Fails	Dean	

=== Music videos ===
Year	Title	Other artist(s)	Director(s)	Ref.
As lead artist
2008	"Higher"	None	Spencer Pratt	
2008	"Overdosin'"	None	Spenser Cohen	
2009	"Blackout"	None	Spencer Pratt	
2024	"Heels"	Mel 4Ever	Alec Cohen	
2025	"I'll Do It"	None	Zhilyova & Daniel Rubinshtein	
2025	"Body Language"	None	Anne-Sophie Bine	
2026	"Summer Love"	None	Heidi Montag	

== Discography ==
=== Studio albums ===
Title	Album details	Peak chart positions	
Title	Album details	US	UK Sales
Superficial	Released: January 11, 2010; Label: Warner; Formats: CD, digital download, LP, streaming	54	74
Heidiwood	Released: May 30, 2025; Label: Pratt Productions; Formats: CD, digital download, streaming	—	– (Note: Heidiwood did not enter the UK Albums Chart, but peaked at number 60 on the UK Album Downloads Chart.)
Masterpiece	Released: June 26, 2026; Label: Pratt Productions; Formats: digital download, streaming	—	—

=== Reissues ===
Title	Album details
Superficial (Anniversary Edition)	Released: January 11, 2025; Label: Pratt Productions; Formats: Digital download, streaming
Superficial 2: Heidiwood Edition	Released: January 24, 2025; Label: Pratt Productions; Formats: Digital download, streaming

=== Extended plays ===
Title	Album details
Dreams Come True	Released: June 15, 2012; Label: Pratt Productions; Formats: Digital download, streaming
2008	Released: November 1, 2024; Label: Pratt Productions; Formats: Digital download, streaming
Dave Audé Remixes	Released: April 4, 2025; Label: Pratt Productions; Formats: Digital download, streaming

=== Singles ===
==== As lead artist ====
Title	Year	Peak chart positions		Album
Title	Year	US Dance/Pop	UK Sales	Album
"Higher"	2008	—	—	Non-album single
"Look How I'm Doin'"	2009	—	—	Superficial
"Body Language"	2009	—	—	Superficial (Anniversary Edition)
"Blackout"	2009	—	—	Superficial
"Superficial"	2009	9	40	Superficial
"I'll Do It" (solo or featuring Pitbull)	2024	5	29	Superficial
"Wet Hot Summer"	2024	—	—	Heidiwood
"5G" (solo or featuring 6arelyhuman)	2024	—	—	Heidiwood
"Scandalous"	2024	—	—	Heidiwood
"Any Excuse to Party"	2024	—	—	Heidiwood
"Go Harder"	2025	—	—	Heidiwood
"Prototype"	2025	—	—	Heidiwood
"No Going Home"	2025	—	—	Heidiwood
"Animal"	2025	—	—	Heidiwood
"Icon"	2025	—	—	Masterpiece
"Step On The Gas”	2026	—	—	Masterpiece
"Supermodel"	2026	—	—	Masterpiece
"IV Drip"	2026	—	—	Masterpiece
"Ex Machina"	2026	—	—	Masterpiece
"Summer Love"	2026	—	—	Masterpiece
"—" denotes a recording that did not chart.

==== Promotional singles ====
Title	Year	Peak chart positions	Album
Title	Year	US Club	Album
"Overdosin'"	2008	—	Superficial (Anniversary Edition)
"More Is More"	2009	27	Superficial
"Turn Ya Head"	2009	—	Superficial
"Glitter and Glory"	2019	—	Non-album singles
"Heels" (with Mel 4Ever)	2024	—	Non-album singles
"Champagne"	2024	—	Non-album singles
"Great 1"	2024	—	Non-album singles
"Explicit"	2025	—	Heidiwood
"Top"	2025	—	Heidiwood
"Spend It"	2026	—	Non-album single
"—" denotes a recording that did not chart.

== Tours ==
- The Heidiwood Tour (2025)

Date (2025)	City	Country	Venue
March 28	San Francisco	United States	1015 Folsom (Fake and Gay 7th Anniversary Party)
April 5	Los Angeles	United States	1720
April 12	Palm Desert	United States	Camp Poosh
May 31	London	England	Clapham Grand
June 1	London	England	Brockwell Park (Mighty Hoopla 2025)
June 13	Malibu	United States	Soho House Malibu
June 27	New York City	United States	Webster Hall
June 28	San Francisco	United States	Pier 80 (SoSF 2025)
August 2	Vancouver	Canada	Celebrities Nightclub
