= More Is More =

Promotional single by Heidi Montag

from the album Superficial
- Released: April 3, 2009
- Genre: Dance-pop; electropop; synth-pop
- Length: 3:05
- Label: Pratt
- Songwriters: Steve Morales, Laura Pergolizzi, Harold St. Louis
- Producer: Steve Morales

"More Is More" is a song performed by American singer and television personality Heidi Montag, and was released on April 3, 2009. The uptempo dance-pop song is lyrically about going to a club with friends and receiving attention from men. The song debuted at number 50 on Billboard's Hot Dance Club Songs chart in July 2009 and peaked at number 27.

== Music and lyrics ==
"More is More" is an uptempo dance-pop song that makes heavy use of synthesizers, especially the auto-tune software to alter Montag's voice. Lyrically, the song is about going to the club with friends, drinking and receiving male attention. In the second half of the song, the lyrics switch from being club-oriented to more sexual.

== Chart performance ==
On the Billboard issue dated July 1, 2009, "More Is More" debuted on the Hot Dance Club Songs chart at number 50, becoming Montag's first song to chart, despite not being released as a single. After five weeks on the chart, it peaked at number 27.

== Charts ==
| Chart (2010) | Peak position |
|---|---|
| US Dance Club Songs (Billboard) | 27 |

== Track list ==
More Is More remix promo CD

1. "More Is More" (Ralphi Rosario clean club mix)
2. "More Is More" (Ralphi Rosario dirty club mix)
3. "More Is More" (Ralphi Rosario dub mix)
4. "More Is More" (Dave Aude radio edit)
