= Lou Diamond Phillips =

American actor (born 1962)

- Phillips in 2026
- Born: Louis Diamond Upchurch; February 17, 1962 (age 64); U.S. Naval Base Subic Bay, Olongapo, Philippines
- Education: University of Texas at Arlington (BFA)
- Occupations: Actor; director; writer
- Years active: 1984–present
- Spouses: Julie Cypher (m. 1987; div. 1990) Kelly Phillips (m. 1994; div. 2007) Yvonne Boismier (m. 2007)
- Children: 4

Louis Diamond Phillips (né Upchurch; born February 17, 1962) is an American actor, director, and writer. His breakthrough came when he starred as Ritchie Valens in the biographical drama film La Bamba (1987). For his performance as Angel David Guzman in Stand and Deliver (1988), he was nominated for a Golden Globe Award for Best Supporting Actor – Motion Picture and won an Independent Spirit Award for Best Supporting Male.

Phillips made his Broadway debut with the 1996 revival of The King and I, earning a Tony Award nomination for his portrayal of King Mongkut of Siam. Phillips's other notable films include Young Guns (1988), Young Guns II (1990), Courage Under Fire (1996), The Big Hit (1998), Brokedown Palace (1999), Che (2008), and The 33 (2015).

In the A&E/Netflix television series Longmire, he played a main character named Henry Standing Bear. He played New York City Police Lieutenant Gil Arroyo on Prodigal Son on FOX from 2019 to 2021.

== Early life ==
Born Louis Diamond Upchurch on February 17, 1962, at the U.S. Naval Base Subic Bay, Olongapo City in the Philippines, he is the son of Lucita Umayam Aranas and Gerald Amon Upchurch, a Marine KC-130 crew chief. His mother was Filipina, while his father is described as an American of Scots-Irish and Cherokee descent. Phillips has claimed to have one-eighth Cherokee ancestry, which was disputed by skeptics, and later claimed "a drop" of Native American ancestry. Bonnie Paradise of the American Indian Registry said Phillips did not provide requested documentation of Native American descent.

Phillips was named after U.S. Marine Lou Diamond.

Phillips's father died when he was a year old, after which his mother remarried and adopted the Phillips surname.

Phillips was raised in Texas. He graduated from Flour Bluff High School in Corpus Christi in 1980 and from the University of Texas at Arlington with a Bachelor of Fine Arts degree in Drama.

== Career ==
=== 1980s ===
Phillips's big break came with the starring role in La Bamba (1987) in which he played early rocker Ritchie Valens. Prior to his cinematic breakthrough, he starred in the Miami Vice episode "Red Tape" (March 13, 1987), portraying detective Bobby Diaz.

In 1988, Phillips co-starred with Edward James Olmos in the inner-city high school drama Stand and Deliver, in a role for which he won the Independent Spirit Award for Best Supporting Male and was nominated for the Golden Globe Award for Best Supporting Actor – Motion Picture. He plays Angel David Guzman, a cholo gangster who is inspired by his math teacher, Jaime Escalante, to excel at calculus. Working to master the subject, he develops a friendship with his teacher. Stand and Deliver was filmed before La Bamba, but it was released a year later.

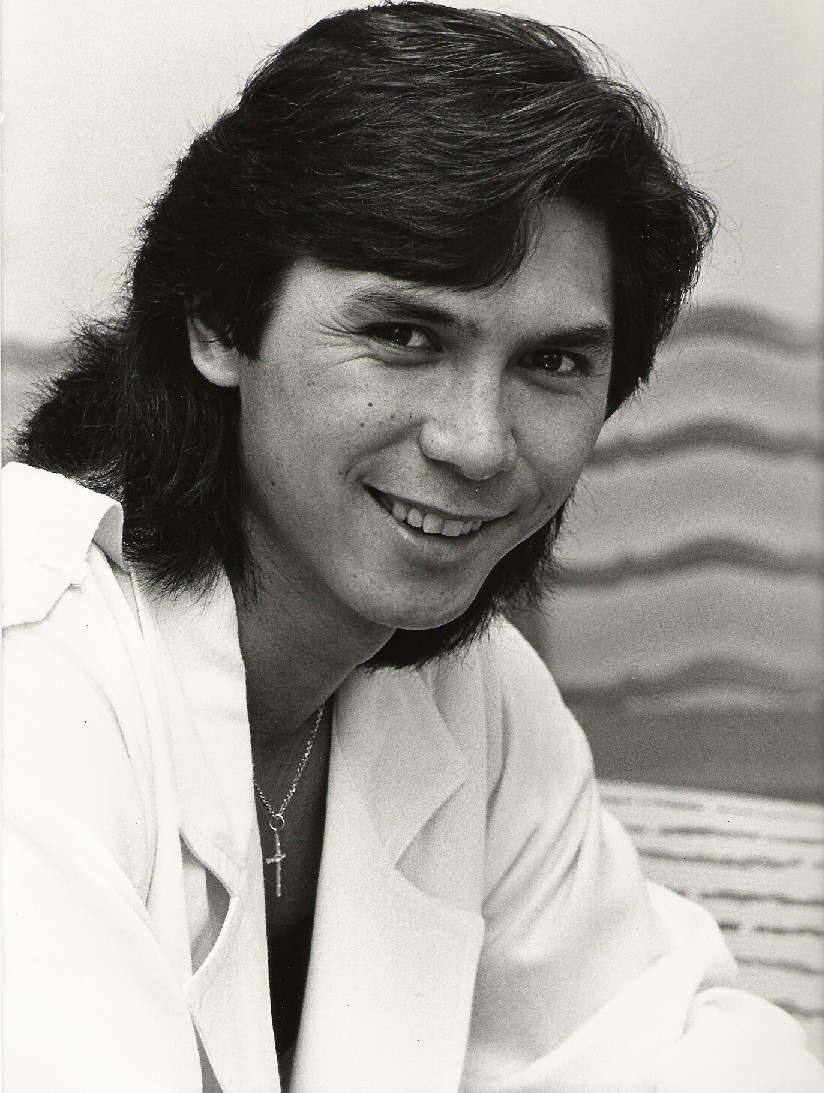
Lou Diamond Phillips in 1987, the year that the film "La Bamba" was released

In 1988 Phillips co-starred with Emilio Estevez and Kiefer Sutherland in the Western film Young Guns, in which he plays José Chávez y Chávez, a historical Old West outlaw.

=== 1990s ===
In 1990, Phillips revisited the role of José Chávez y Chávez in Young Guns II. He suffered a severe injury during the filming. Gunshots spooked the horse he was riding, resulting in Phillips being bucked off and dragged for 100 feet as his leg was caught in a stirrup. Phillips was emergency airlifted via helicopter to have surgery to repair his right arm which was broken in four places.

In the mid-1990s, Phillips was a vocalist with the Los Angeles-based rock group The Pipefitters.

In 1993, Phillips was among the guests on the Randy Travis television special Wind in the Wire.

In 1996, Phillips made his Broadway debut as the King in Richard Rodgers and Oscar Hammerstein II's The King and I. Phillips won a Theatre World Award, and was nominated for both a Tony Award and a Drama Desk Award for his performance.

In 1998, he starred as Cisco, the counterpart of the main character Melvin Smiley (played by Mark Wahlberg) in the comedy-action film The Big Hit.

=== 2000s ===
Phillips later had a minor role in the TV sitcom George Lopez (2002–2004) as George Lopez's half-brother. He also played a role in the first season of the TV series 24 as secret government agent Mark DeSalvo, opposite former Young Guns star Kiefer Sutherland.

In 2003, he starred in a cameo role with Harrison Ford and Josh Hartnett in the action-comedy film Hollywood Homicide.

Phillips played the recurring role of FBI agent Ian Edgerton in the television series Numbers. Edgerton is an FBI tracker and sniper who works as an instructor at Quantico FBI Academy when he is not working a case in the field. Phillips won the second season of the NBC reality series, I'm a Celebrity...Get Me Out of Here!, over pro wrestler Torrie Wilson.

On September 11, 2007, Phillips joined the touring troupe for Lerner and Loewe's Camelot in the role of King Arthur.

Phillips had a recurring role as Colonel Telford in the Stargate Universe television series during its two-season run on the Syfy channel 2009–2011. He played the would-be commander of the Destiny expedition, who is left behind when an accident launches an unsuspecting crew into deep space. The commander works from Earth to bring the crew home, often coming into conflict with the shipborne command characters.

=== 2010s ===
Phillips hosted the weekly series An Officer and a Movie (2011–2013) on American Heroes Channel. This series features various theatrical World War II dramas, with discussion breaks during the film in which Phillips interviews members of the US military and intelligence communities about details of the events that inspired each film.

In January 2012, he was one of eight celebrities participating in the Food Network reality series Rachael vs. Guy: Celebrity Cook-Off. On January 29, 2012, he was announced as the winner with a Zagat score of 28 out of 30, thereby winning $50,000 for his charity.

In June 2012, Phillips began co-starring in the television series Longmire, about a modern-day sheriff in Wyoming, played by Robert Taylor. Phillips played Henry Standing Bear, a Native American, who is a longtime friend of Longmire and has a saloon/restaurant. He often helps the sheriff with cases and in dealing with the Cheyenne reservation police. They do not respect or like non-natives, especially local, state or federal law enforcement with competing authority. The series ran for six seasons to 2017.

In December 2012, Phillips was featured in Imagine Dragons' music video for "Radioactive", which exceeded 1 billion views on YouTube.

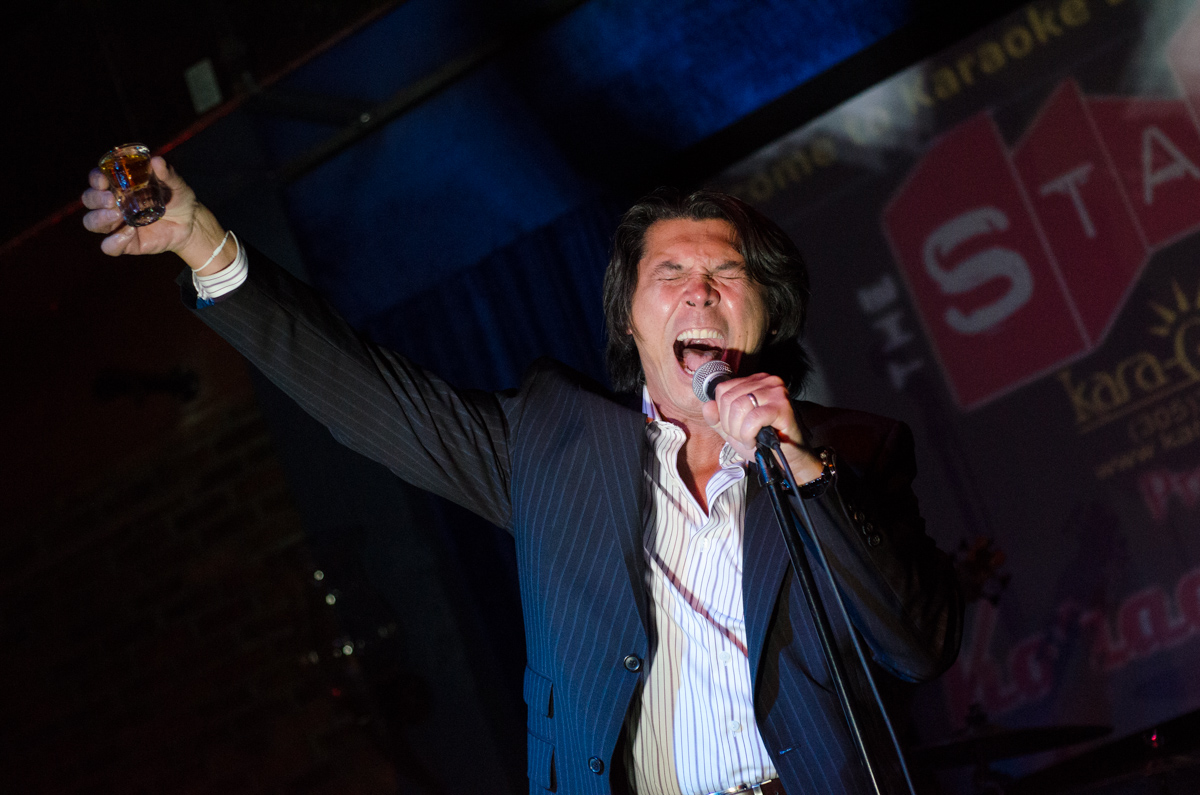
Phillips performing at an after-party for the film Filly Brown at the 2013 Miami International Film Festival

In February 2013, Phillips appeared as star of the comedy short film Lucy in the Sky with Diamond, playing a version of himself known as the elusive and mysterious LDP—a renegade, spirit guide, and life coach who attempts to help John (John Patrick Jordan) get over a particularly disconcerting ex-girlfriend. The award-winning short was written and directed by Joey Boukadakis.

In July 2014, he replaced the injured Jason Scott Lee in Opera Australia's Melbourne production of The King and I, reprising his role as the King of Siam, playing opposite Lisa McCune as Anna Leonowens.

In 2015, he guest-starred in The Wiggles Rock and Roll PreSchool DVD and made guest appearances on their TV program on ABC.

In 2016, Phillips portrayed serial killer Richard Ramirez in The Night Stalker.

=== 2020s ===
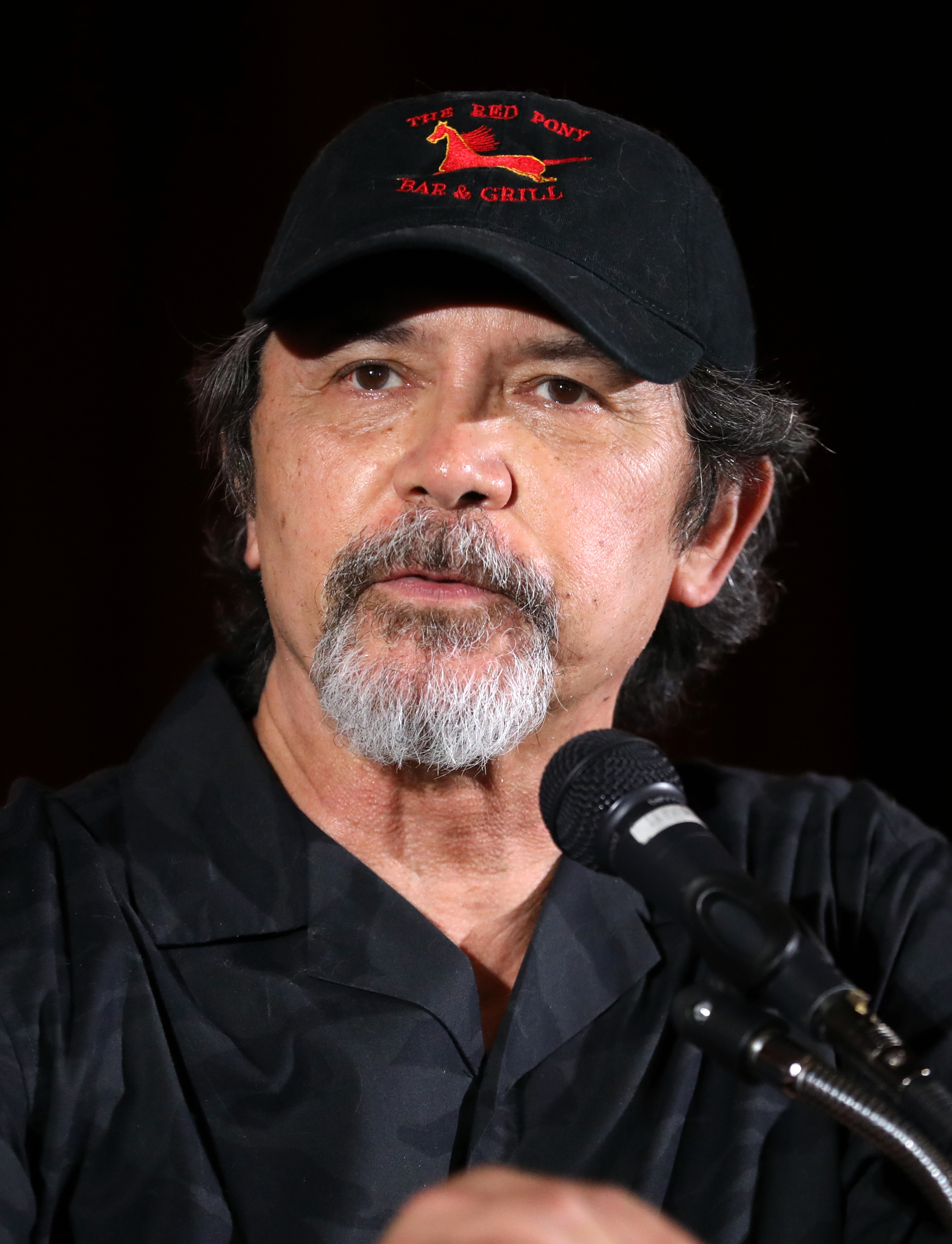
Phillips in 2024

In 2023, Phillips competed in season nine of The Masked Singer as "Mantis". After being spared by Robin Thicke ringing the Ding Dong Keep It On Bell on "WB Movie Night", he was eliminated during the "Battle of the Saved" alongside Keenan Allen as "Gargoyle". Phillips also mentioned that he did the competition for his daughter Indigo and her friend Fluffy.

That same year, he starred opposite Malcolm McDowell in the independently-produced comedy thriller film Et Tu.

=== Radio ===
Phillips voiced four episodes of the radio series The Twilight Zone: Vol. 1, "A Kind of a Stopwatch"; Vol. 3, "The Parallel; Vol. 10, "Miniature"; and Vol. 12, "Long Live Walter Jameson".

=== Writing ===
Phillips co-wrote the screenplay for Trespasses and Dangerous Touch, and wrote the feature Ambition (both of which he also starred in). In 2019, Aethon Books announced that it would be publishing Phillips's debut novel, Tinderbox: Soldier of Indira, a science fiction retelling of the Hans Christian Andersen story of the same name. It was illustrated by his wife, Yvonne Boismier.

== Personal life ==
=== Relationships and family ===
During the making of Trespasses, he met Julie Cypher, an assistant director. They married on September 17, 1987, and divorced on August 5, 1990. After their divorce, Cypher came out as lesbian. She began a long-term relationship with Melissa Etheridge.

On the set of the film Shadow of the Wolf (1992), he met Jennifer Tilly. They were briefly engaged.

In 1994, he married makeup artist Kelly Phillips. They had three daughters together but separated in 2003. Their divorce was finalized in July 2007.

Phillips began dating makeup artist Yvonne Boismier in 2004. He was charged with misdemeanor domestic battery against her in 2006. They married in August 2007 and their daughter was born in October 2007. They are partners in writing, and she illustrated Phillips's first published novel.

=== Legal issues ===
On August 11, 2006, Phillips was arrested for disturbing the peace at his Los Angeles home. The charges followed loud noises coming from the house he shared with his live-in girlfriend and future wife, Yvonne Boismier. In December 2006, he pleaded no contest to a count of domestic battery and was sentenced to three years of probation.

On November 3, 2017, Phillips was arrested in Portland, Texas, for DWI after stopping his vehicle to ask a police officer for directions. He was charged with reckless driving. Phillips was released after posting bail. In April 2018, following a plea deal, Phillips was sentenced to two years of probation.

=== Poker ===
Phillips has been a regular poker player since college. In May 2009, Phillips placed 31st of 403 entrants in the 2009 California State Poker Championship Limit Texas hold 'em. He cashed in the $10,000 July 2009 World Series of Poker World Championship No Limit main event. In a field of 6,494, he was eliminated in the phase from 407 to 185. He started the day in 114th place among the 407 and was busted on the final hand of the day, finishing in 186th place and earning $36,626.

== Activism ==
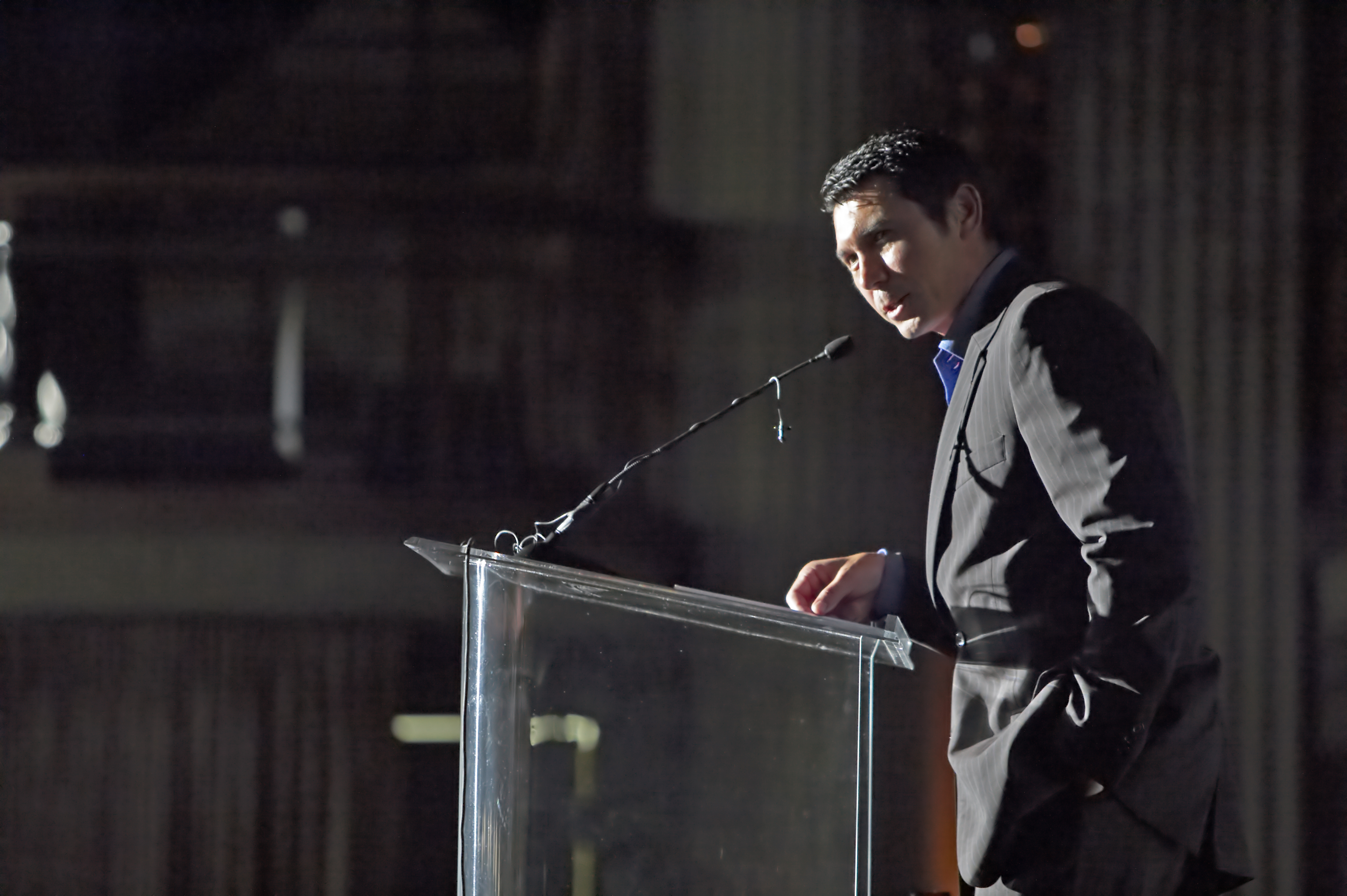
Phillips speaking at the Filipino American Library Spirit Awards and Dinner Gala in Los Angeles in October 2006

Phillips serves on the advisory council of The Coalition of Asian Pacifics in Entertainment, an organization that "champions diversity by educating, connecting, and empowering Asian American and Pacific Islander artists and leaders in entertainment and media." He was born in the Philippines and is half Filipino through his mother.

Indian Country Today has reported that Phillips is part Cherokee on his father's side. The director of the American Indian registry said he did not document Cherokee ancestry when it was requested, and his claim is disputed by skeptics. In 1990, Phillips organized a concert called "The Winds of Life" to benefit Native American causes.

In 1991, he was adopted by an Oglala Lakota Sioux family in a traditional ceremony. His Lakota name translates to "Star Keeper".

Phillips is also a member of the Canadian charity Artists Against Racism. In 2020, he appeared in the NoH8 LGBTQ equality campaign.

Phillips endorsed Democratic presidential nominee Kamala Harris in the 2024 presidential election.

== Awards and achievements ==
- 1989 – Independent Spirit Award for Best Supporting Male (Stand and Deliver, 1988)
- 1989 – Golden Globe Award nominee for Best Supporting Actor – Motion Picture (Stand and Deliver, 1988)
- 1989 – Western Heritage Award Bronze Wrangler Theatrical Motion Picture (Young Guns, 1988). Shared with John Fusco (producer), Christopher Cain (producer), Charlie Sheen (actor), Emilio Estevez (actor), Kiefer Sutherland (actor)
- 1993 – Oxfam America award for his dedication toward ending world hunger
- 1994 – Houston International Film Festival Gold award for Best Theatrical Feature Film for Ultimate Revenge
- 1996 – Tony Award nominee for Best Actor on Broadway (The King And I)
- 1996 – Theater World Award: The King and I
- 1996 – New York Outer Critics Circle: Outstanding Broadway Debut Award of an Actor, The King & I
- 1997 – Blockbuster Entertainment Award for Favorite Supporting Actor – Adventure/Drama (Courage Under Fire, 1996)
- 1997 – Lone Star Film & Television Award for Best Supporting Actor (Courage Under Fire, 1996)
- 2001 – Filipinas magazine "Achievement award for Entertainment"
- 2003 – Cinemanila Film Festival Lifetime Achievement Award (Philippines)
- 2005 – Asia Pacific Islander Heritage Award for Excellence in Entertainment and Arts
- 2009 – I'm a Celebrity... Get Me Out of Here!: King of the Jungle
- 2012 – Rachael vs. Guy: Celebrity Cook-Off: Winner
- 2024 – Los Angeles IFS Film Festival Award for Best Actor (Et Tu, 2023)

== Filmography ==
=== Film ===
Year	Title	Role	Notes
1984	Time Bomb	Terrorist	TV movie
1984	Interface	Punk No. 1	
1986	Trespasses	Drifter	
1987	La Bamba	Ritchie Valens	
1987	The Three Kings	"Tag"	TV movie
1988	Stand and Deliver	Angel David Guzman	
1988	Young Guns	José Chávez y Chávez	
1988	Dakota	John Dakota	
1989	Disorganized Crime	Ray Forgy	
1989	Renegades	Hank Storm	
1990	The First Power	Detective Russell Logan	
1990	A Show of Force	Jesus Fuentes	
1990	Demon Wind	Demon	
1990	Young Guns II	José Chávez y Chávez	
1990	Arduous Moon	Bob	Short
1991	Harley	Harley	
1991	Ambition	Mitchell Osgood	
1991	The Dark Wind	Officer Jim Chee	
1992	Shadow of the Wolf	Agaguk	
1993	Extreme Justice	Detective Jeff Powers	
1994	Dangerous Touch	Mick Burroughs	
1994	Teresa's Tattoo	Wheeler	
1994	Sioux City	Jesse Rainfeather Goldman	
1994	Boulevard	Hassan	
1994	Override	Cal	Short
1995	Hourglass	Ray Lucas	Video
1995	The Wharf Rat	Petey Martin	TV movie
1996	Undertow	Jack Ketchum	TV movie
1996	Courage Under Fire	Staff Sergeant John Monfriez	
1998	The Big Hit	Cisco	
1998	Another Day in Paradise	"Jewels"	
1999	Brokedown Palace	Roy Knox	
1999	In a Class of His Own	Ricardo "Rich" Donato	TV movie
1999	Bats	Sheriff Emmett Kimsey	
1999	Crucible of Empire	Emilio Aguinaldo (voice)	
2000	Supernova	Yerzy Penalosa	
2000	Picking Up the Pieces	Officer Alfonso	
2000	A Better Way to Die	William Dexter	
2001	Hangman	Detective Nick Roos	TV movie
2001	Knight Club	Dirk Gueron	
2001	Route 666	Deputy U.S. Marshal Jack La Roca	
2002	Lone Hero	Bart	
2002	Malevolent	Jack Lucas	
2002	Stark Raving Mad	Gregory	
2003	K10C: Kids' Ten Commandments	Natha (voice)	Short
2003	Absolon	Agent Walters	
2003	Hollywood Homicide	Wanda	
2003	Red Water	John Sanders	TV movie
2004	The Trail to Hope Rose	Keenan Deerfield	TV movie
2005	Gone, But Not Forgotten	Alan Page	TV movie
2005	Murder at the Presidio	Chief Warrant Officer James Chandler	TV movie
2005	Alien Express	Vic Holden	TV movie
2006	El Cortez	Manny DeSilva	
2006	Fingerprints	Doug	
2006	Striking Range	Eugene "Vash" Vasher	
2007	Termination Point	Dr. Daniel Winter	TV movie
2007	The Bet	Henry	Short
2008	Death Toll	Mayor Padial	
2008	Never Forget	Frank Hill	
2008	Lone Rider	Bobby Hattaway	TV movie
2008	Che	Mario Monje	
2009	Love Takes Wing	Ray Russell	TV movie
2009	Carny	Atlas	TV movie
2009	Angel and the Badman	"Quirt" Evans	TV movie
2010	Transparency	David	
2010	The Invited	Garrett	
2011	Metal Tornado	Michael Edwards	TV movie
2012	Filly Brown	José Tenorio	
2012	Lucy in the Sky with Diamond	LDP	Short
2013	Sanitarium	James Silo	
2014	Sequoia	Colin	
2014	The Wisdom to Know the Difference	Carlos	
2015	The 33	Luis "Don Lucho" Urzúa	
2015	Sky	Duane	
2016	The Night Stalker	Richard Ramirez	TV movie
2017	Created Equal	Monsignor Renzulli	
2017	Cop and a Half: New Recruit	Detective Simmons	TV movie
2017	Quest	Gus	
2017	The Last Train	Gunner	
2017	Avenge the Crows	Casper	
2018	Urban Country	Warden Tono	
2019	Big Kill	Johnny Kane	
2020	Adverse	Dr. Cruz	
2022	Constantine: The House of Mystery	Spectre (voice)	Video
2022	Easter Sunday	Himself	
2022	Aztec Warrior God, Emergence	Narrator	Short
2023	Et Tu	Brent	
2024	Justice League: Crisis on Infinite Earths	Owlman/Spectre (voice)	
2024	Get Fast	The Cowboy	
2024	Werewolves	Dr. Aranda	
2025	Keep Quiet	Teddy Sharpe	
2026	Casa Grande	Roy Reyes	

=== Television ===
Year	Title	Role	Notes
1985	Dallas	Sidewalk thug	Episode: "Rock Bottom"
1987	Miami Vice	Bobby Diaz	Episode: "Red Tape"
1992	General Motors Playwrights Theater	"Clash"	Episode: "Avenue Z Afternoon"
1993	Tales from the Crypt	Jerry	Episode: "Oil's Well That Ends Well"
1993	The Untold West	The Narrator (voice)	Episode: "Outlaws, Rebels and Rogues"
1997	Happily Ever After: Fairy Tales for Every Child	Coatl (voice)	Episode: "The Shoemaker and the Elves"
1998	Mad TV	Himself	Episode: "Episode #3.22"
1998	The Outer Limits	Cotter McCoy	Episode: "Identity Crisis"
1998	Adventures from the Book of Virtues	Martín (voice)	Episode: "Charity"
1998	Spin City	Nate	Episode: "An Officer and a Gentleman"
1999	Behind the Music	Himself	Episode: "The Day the Music Died"
2001	Arli$$	Himself	Episode: "Fielding Offers"
2001	Night Visions	Tom Fallor	Episode: "Dead Air/Renovation"
2001–2002	Wolf Lake	John Kanin	Main role
2002	24	Mark DeSalvo	Recurring role (season 1)
2002	Resurrection Blvd.	Harry Tran	Recurring role (season 3)
2002	The Twilight Zone	Ritchie Almares	Episode: "The Pool Guy"
2003	Storyline Online	Himself	Episode: "The Polar Express"
2003	The Handler	Andy Torres	Episode: "Jar of Spiders"
2003	George Lopez	George Lopez	Guest role (seasons 2–3)
2004	World Poker Tour	Himself	Episode: "Hollywood Home Game II"
2004	VH1 Goes Inside	Himself	Episode: "Awesome Movie Songs"
2005	Jack & Bobby	Juan Roberto Alba	Episode: "Legacy"
2005	The Triangle	Meeno Paloma	Main role
2005–2010	Numbers	Ian Edgerton	Guest role (seasons 1–2); recurring role (season 3 & 5–6)
2006	Law & Order: Special Victims Unit	Victor Paul Gitano	Episode: "Fault"
2007	WWE Raw	Himself	Episode: "World Tag Team Championship Gauntlet Match"
2007	Psych	Lars Ewing	Episode: "Psy vs. Psy"
2009	Whatever Happened To?	Himself	Episode: "Hunks on the Road"
2009	I'm a Celebrity...Get Me Out of Here!	Himself/Contestant	Contestant (season 2)
2009	2009 World Series of Poker	Himself	Main guest
2009	The Beast	Capone	Episode: "Capone"
2009–2011	Stargate Universe	David Telford	Recurring role
2010	American Dad!	Rusty (voice)	Episode: "There Will Be Bad Blood"
2011	Chuck	Augusto Gaez	Episode: "Chuck Versus the Cat Squad"
2011	Happily Divorced	David	Episode: "A Kiss Is Just a Kiss"
2011–2012	An Officer and a Movie	Himself/Host	
2011–2013	Cougar Town	Himself	Recurring role (season 2); guest role (season 4)
2012	Rachael vs. Guy: Celebrity Cook-Off	Himself	Contestant (season 1)
2012	The Aquabats! Super Show!	The Spirit of The Sun	Episode: "Eagle Claw!"
2012	Southland	Danny Ferguson	Recurring role (season 4)
2012–2017	Longmire	Henry Standing Bear	Main role
2013	Ironside	Stuart White	Episode: "Hidden Agenda"
2014	Hell's Kitchen	Himself	Episode: "7 Chefs Compete"
2015	Another Period	Yengundo	Episode: "Funeral"
2015–2020	Blindspot	Saúl Guerrero	Recurring role (season 1); guest role (season 5)
2016	The Crossroads of History	Taino Chief	Episode: "Columbus"
2016–2020	Elena of Avalor	Victor Delgado (voice)	Recurring role
2017	Hawaii Five-O	Wes Lincoln	Episode: "Ka Laina Ma Ke One"
2017	Training Day	Thurman Ballesteros	Episode: "Sunset"
2017	The Ranch	Clint	Recurring role (season 2)
2017	Brooklyn Nine-Nine	Jeff Romero	Episode: "The Big House Pt. 1 & 2"
2017	You're the Worst	Himself	Episode: "Dad-Not-Dad"
2017	Graves	Vinyasa retreat guru	Episode: "They Die Happier"
2018	Criminal Minds	Clifford Mason	Episode: "Submerged"
2018	NCIS: New Orleans	Gossett	Episode: "Checkmate, Part I & II"
2018	Goliath	Oscar Suarez	Recurring role (season 2)
2018–2020	Blue Bloods	Luis Delgado	Guest role (season 9); recurring role (season 10)
2019	The Lion Guard	Surak (voice)	Recurring role (season 3)
2019–2021	Prodigal Son	Gil Arroyo	Main role
2020	Family Guy	Tribe Leader (voice)	Episode: "Pawtucket Pat"
2021	Trese	Sancho Santamaria (voice)	Recurring role
2022	Search Party	John	Episode: "The Gospel of Judas"
2022	The Cleaning Lady	Joe Fabroa	Episode: "Kabayan"
2022	Bull	Victor Taggart	Episode: "The Hard Right"
2022–2024	Firebuds	Bill Bayani (voice)	Recurring role
2023	The Masked Singer	Himself/"Mantis"	Contestant (season 9)
2023	Quantum Leap	Shepherd Barnes	Episode: "Nomads"
2024	The Legend of Vox Machina	Gentry (voice)	Episode: "Cloak and Dagger"
2025–present	The Chair Company	Jeff Levjman	Recurring role
2026	Stranger Things: Tales from '85	Daniel Fischer (voice)	Recurring role

=== Music videos ===
Year	Artist	Title	Role
1987	Los Lobos	"La Bamba"	Himself
1989	Melissa Etheridge	"The Angels"	Himself
1989	Michael Jackson	"Liberian Girl"	Himself
1991	Sesame Street	"Monster in the Mirror"	Himself
2012	Imagine Dragons	"Radioactive"	Ringleader
2020	Brian Evans	"It's A Beautiful Game"	Himself

=== Video games ===
Year	Title	Role	Notes
2004	X-Men Legends	Forge	
2005	X-Men Legends II: Rise of Apocalypse	Forge	
2024	Call of Duty: Black Ops 6	Daniel Livingstone	
