= Heidiwood =

Studio album by Heidi Montag
- Released: May 30, 2025
- Genres: Pop; dance
- Length: 56:25
- Label: Pratt Productions
- Producers: AObeats; Dallas Caton; S2XS; Lil Aaron; Grandma; Veronica Wyman; Sizzy Rocket; Lynn Gunn; Housefly; Jakkyboí; Smrtdeath; Sophie Rose; Rollo Spreckley; Marky Style; Aaron Blackmar; Jacob Munk

Heidi Montag chronology
Dave Audé Remixes (2025)	Heidiwood (2025)	Masterpiece (2026)

Singles from Heidiwood
- 1. "Wet Hot Summer" Released: June 28, 2024; 2. "Prototype" Released: January 17, 2025; 3. "No Going Home" Released: April 25, 2025; 4. "Animal" Released: May 30, 2025

Heidiwood is the second studio album by American television personality and pop singer Heidi Montag. Released on May 30, 2025, through Pratt Productions, "Heidiwood" is Montag's first album release in fifteen years and reached the Top 10 on iTunes in 7 different countries, including the Top 5 in the United States. The official album artwork was shot by famed celebrity photographer Markus Klinko.

Heidiwood was preceded by the release of the singles "Wet Hot Summer", "Prototype", and "No Going Home" with the album's 4th and final single "Animal" released alongside the album.

Some tracks of Heidiwood were also included on Superficial 2: Heidiwood Edition, a 2025 reissue of her debut album Superficial (2010).

== Background ==
Heidi Montag released her debut album Superficial in 2010, which was poorly received critically and commercially. Over the years, the project was revisited by many music critics and has gone on to develop somewhat of a cult following, with many people calling it "underrated" and stating how Montag's image at the time affected the album's reputation.

In late 2023, the song "I'll Do It" went viral on the video-sharing TikTok, generating more than a billion impressions across social media and streaming platforms. The unexpected success of the song and the retrospective acclaim of Superficial inspired Montag to return to the studio and record her second album. The comeback single, "Wet Hot Summer", was released in June 2024, followed by a series of promotional singles including "5G", "Scandalous", "Any Excuse to Party" and "Go Harder".

In January 2025, Montag was affected by the Palisades Fire in Los Angeles, losing her home and belongings. To show support, fans started to buy and stream her album Superficial, while "I'll Do It" received a second wind and became viral again. She also released an anniversary edition for the album and another extra edition titled Superficial 2: Heidiwood Edition, which included twelve brand new tracks which were considered the first taste of the full Heidiwood album.

== Promotion ==
"Wet Hot Summer" was released on June 28, 2024, as the album's first single. It was produced by Lil Aaron and labeled as her "pop comeback", receiving positive reviews. the second single "Prototype" was released as the second single on January 17, 2025. The song pokes fun at the criticism Montag has received for her plastic surgeries. The third single "No Going Home" was released on April 25, 2025, and recalls her experience losing her home in the 2025 California Wildfires. The fourth and final single "Animal" was released on May 30, 2025, alongside the album's release.

"5G" was released on September 13, 2024, as the album's first promotional single. A remix featuring 6arelyhuman was released on September 27, 2024, and an extended mix of the song was included on Heidiwood's tracklist. The songs "Scandalous", "Any Excuse to Party" and "Go Harder" were also released as promotional singles, with the latter coming out alongside the album's pre-order and announcement.

Montag further promoted the album with a series of performances at pride gigs and festivals, including Mighty Hoopla in London.

== Track listing ==
Heidiwood track listing
No.	Title	Writer(s)	Producer(s)	Length
1.	"Thank Me"	Dallas Caton; Alexandra Veltri	Caton	2:17
2.	"Heidiwood" (featuring Chase Icon)	Chase Icon	S2XS; AObeats	2:11
3.	"Wet Hot Summer"	Aaron Puckett; Liam Hall	Lil Aaron; Grandma	2:09
4.	"Prototype"	Andrew Okamura; Veronica Wyman; Veltri	AObeats; Wyman	2:25
5.	"Any Excuse To Party"	Veltri; Okamura; Wyman	AObeats; Wyman	2:25
6.	"Screensaver"	Caton; Benicio Bryant; Veltri	Caton	2:21
7.	"Under Your Clothes"	Caton; Veltri; Alex Chapman	Caton	2:14
8.	"Sriracha"	Sizzy Rocket; Lynn Gunn; Simon Wilcox	Rocket; Gunn	1:59
9.	"5G" (Extended Mix)	Cedric de Saint-Home; Noah Davis; Sophie Rose	Housefly	2:08
10.	"Go Harder"	Jackson Southorn; Mike Skwark	Jakkyboí; Smrtdeath	2:57
11.	"Top"	Saint-Home; Rose	Housefly; Rose	2:31
12.	"Tetris"	Oliver Frid; Gustav Landell; Rocket	Rocket; Rollo Spreckley	2:03
13.	"Flash" (Extended Mix)	Caton; Veltri; Marky Style	Caton; Style	2:31
14.	"Forgive and Forget"	Jordyn Kane; Cali Rodi; Aaron Blackmar; Heidi Montag	Blackmar	3:22
15.	"Bad Publicity"	Rodi; GG Ramirez; Jacob Munk	Munk	2:21
16.	"Scandalous"	Chrissy Chlapecka; Harmony Tividad; Rocket	AObeats; Wyman	3:21
17.	"America's Sweetheart"	Blackmar; Rodi; Kane	Blackmar	2:36
18.	"White Flag"	Blackmar; Rodi; Kane	Blackmar	2:40
19.	"Animal"	Cedric de Saint-Rome; Sophie Rose	Housefly; Rose	2:35
20.	"Explicit"	Rocket; Smrtdeath; Jakkyboí	Jakkyboí; Rose; Blackmar	2:04
21.	"I Wanna Be Your Girl"	Veltri; Midi Jones	Jones	2:22
22.	"Last Call"	Veltri; Caton; Lily Hormel	Caton	1:57
23.	"No Going Home"	Rodi; Alex Nobile; Blackmar	Blackmar	3:10

CD bonus track
No.	Title	Length
24.	"Go Harder" (Only Fire Remix)

== Charts ==
Chart performance for Heidiwood
Chart (2025)	Peak position
UK Album Downloads (Official Charts)	60
