= I'm a Celebrity...Get Me Out of Here! (American TV series) season 2 =

I'm a Celebrity...Get Me Out of Here!
- Season 2
- Presented by: Myleene Klass and Damien Fahey
- No. of days: 24
- No. of contestants: 12
- Winner: Lou Diamond Phillips
- Runner-up: Torrie Wilson
- Location: Las Horquetas, Sarapiquí, Costa Rica
- No. of episodes: 14

Release
- Original network: NBC
- Original release: June 1 – June 24, 2009

Season chronology
- ← Previous; Season 1 (2003)

The second season of I'm a Celebrity...Get Me out of Here! premiered on June 1, 2009, and concluded on June 24, 2009. The season, aired on NBC, a revival of the ABC series of the same name and continued to follow the same format as the original British series.

It was also broadcast in Ireland and the United Kingdom. In Ireland, the show aired on TV3, three days behind the original NBC airings, and in the UK, it aired on ITV2 with a seven-day delay. The show was aired on STAR World in South East Asia, Hong Kong, Taiwan and Korea from July 8, 2009.

With the network change, the series changed hosts, with Myleene Klass and Damien Fahey presenting the second season. The revival began with eleven contestants who were originally split into two teams: red and yellow. Shortly thereafter, the eleven contestants were split into teams based on gender. Heidi and Spencer Pratt quit the show on day two, but they both returned, only to withdraw once again for a final time when Heidi became ill. Daniel Baldwin (Stephen Baldwin's brother) joined the show partway through the season, and Holly Montag (Heidi Pratt's sister) became a cast member soon after.

== Celebrities ==
Celebrity	Notability (known for)	Place
Lou Diamond Phillips	Stage & screen actor	Winner on June 24, 2009
Torrie Wilson	Former WWE Diva	Runner-up on June 24, 2009
John Salley	Former NBA power forward	Third place on June 24, 2009
Patti Blagojevich	Former First Lady of Illinois	Eliminated 6th on June 23, 2009
Sanjaya Malakar	Former American Idol contestant	Eliminated 5th on June 23, 2009
Holly Montag	The Hills star	Eliminated 4th on June 22, 2009
Stephen Baldwin	Film & television actor	Withdrew on June 19, 2009
Janice Dickinson	Supermodel	Eliminated 3rd on June 18, 2009
Daniel Baldwin	Film & television actor	Eliminated 2nd on June 11, 2009
Heidi Montag	The Hills star	Withdrew on June 8, 2009
Spencer Pratt	The Hills star	Withdrew on June 8, 2009
Frances Callier	Frangela comedian & actress	Withdrew on June 8, 2009
Angela V. Shelton	Frangela comedian & actress	Eliminated 1st on June 4, 2009

== Results and elimination ==
	Day 2	Day 3	Day 4	Day 8	Day 10	Day 11	Day 15	Day 16	Day 17	Day 18	Day 22	Day 23	Day 26 The Final
Lou Diamond Phillips	Immune			Immune			Immune				Immune (Note: Immune due to winning the public's vote)	Nominated	Winner (Day 24)
Torrie Wilson	Nominated		Btm 2	Nominated			Nominated				Immune	Nominated	Runner-Up (Day 24)
John Salley	Immune			Nominated		Btm 2	Immune (Note: Immune as the camp leader)				Nominated	Btm 3	Third Place (Day 24)
Patti Blagojevich	Immune (Note: Immune due to being chosen by the camp leader)			Nominated		Btm 3	Nominated			Btm 2	Immune	Evicted (Day 23)	
Sanjaya Malakar	Immune			Nominated			Nominated				Immune	Evicted (Day 23)	
Holly Montag				Nominated		Nominated				Evicted (Day 18)	Re-evicted (Day 22) (Note: Holly brought back into competition, but was evicted again soon after.)		
Stephen Baldwin	Immune			Nominated			Nominated			Btm 3	Quit (Day 22)		
Janice Dickinson	Nominated			Nominated			Nominated			Evicted (Day 18)			
Daniel Baldwin		Immune (Note: Immune due to joining the challenge-winning team late)		Nominated		Evicted (Day 11)							
Heidi Montag	Quit (Day 2) (Note: Quit the show, then asked to return.)		(Note: Kept in isolation to decide whether he/she could return.)	Quit (Day 8) (Note: Quit again due to Heidi's health complications.)									
Spencer Pratt	Quit (Day 2)		(Note: Kept in isolation to decide whether he/she could return.)	Quit (Day 8)									
Frances Callier	Nominated			Quit (Day 8) (Note: Quit after Angela was evicted)									
Angela V. Shelton	Nominated		Evicted (Day 4)										

Key

Indicates the winner celebrity
Indicates the runner-up celebrity
Indicates the celebrity In Third place
Nominated for eviction
Bottom two, three or four in the public vote
Evicted
Withdrew

Immune due to a challenge win
Immune for another reason:

Teams

Yellow team
Red team
Male team
Female team
Individual team

== Trials ==
Trial Number	Date	Name of Trial	Celebrities Taking Part	Winner	Reward	Notes
1	30 May 2009	Bug Eating Challenge (Team Food Challenge)	Angela; Frances; Heidi; John; Lou; Patti; Sanjaya; Stephen; Spencer; Torrie	John; Lou; Sanjaya; Spencer; Stephen	Pineapple and Chicken Dinner	None
2	31 May 2009	Goo Holding Challenge (Leadership Challenge)	Janice; Lou	Lou	Camp Leader Position	None
3	1 June 2009	Trauma Tank (Live Team Immunity Challenge)	Angela; Frances; Janice; John; Lou; Patti; Sanjaya; Stephen; Torrie	Sanjaya	Immunity (For The Whole Men's Team)	^{See; Note 1}
4	2 June 2009	Lost Chamber (Team Food Challenge)	Heidi; Spencer	Spencer	Fish Dinner	None
5	3 June 2009	Rocky Horror Trial (Team Food Challenge)	Angela; Frances; John; Lou; Patti; Sanjaya; Stephen; Torrie	John; Lou; Sanjaya; Stephen	Pork Dinner	None
6	4 June 2009	On Your Knees (Team Food Challenge)	John; Patti; Daniel; Torrie	John; Daniel	Fruit and Mushroom Dinner	None
7	6 June 2009	Flash Flood (Team Food Challenge)	Janice; Sanjaya	Sanjaya	Lobster and Fruit Dinner	None
8	7 June 2009	Jungle Joe's All You Can Eat Buffet (Leadership Challenge)	Daniel; Janice; John; Lou; Patti; Sanjaya; Stephen; Torrie	Lou (after vote)	Leadership	^{See; Note 2}
9	8 June 2009	Hang Tough (Live Immunity Challenge)	Daniel; John; Lou; Patti; Sanjaya; Stephen; Torrie	Lou	Individual; Immunity	^{See; Note 3}
10	9 June 2009	Operating Game (Team Food Challenge)	Daniel; Holly; Janice; Lou	Holly; Janice	Hot Dog and Chips Dinner	None
11	9 June 2009	Lumberjack Stars (Luxury Challenge)	John; Patti; Stephen; Torrie	Patti; Torrie	Fitness Equipment, Granola Bars, and Smoothies	None
12	11 June 2009	Grocery Shopping (Team Food Challenge)	Holly; Sanjaya	Sanjaya	Mexican Dinner	None
13	15 June 2009	Walk the Plank (Luxury Challenge)	John; Lou; Patti; Torrie	Patti; Torrie	Massage	None
14	15 June 2009	Scavenger Hunt (Luxury Challenge)	Holly; Janice; John; Lou; Patti; Sanjaya; Stephen; Torrie	Holly; Janice; John; Lou; Patti; Sanjaya; Stephen; Torrie	Smores	None
15	15 June 2009	Tunnel of Terror (Team Food Challenge)	Sanjaya; Torrie	Sanjaya	Not revealed	^{See; Note 4}
16	15 June 2009	Camp Quiz (Leadership Challenge)	Holly; Janice; John; Patti; Sanjaya; Stephen; Torrie	John	Leadership	^{See; Note 5}
17	16 June 2009	Snake Strike (Team Food Trial)	Lou; Torrie	Lou	Bread, Pasta and Vegetable Dinner	None
18	16 June 2009	Up In Arms (Live Immunity Trial)	Holly; Janice; John; Lou; Patti; Sanjaya; Torrie	Lou	Individual; Immunity	^{See; Note 6}
19	17 June 2009	Spider Web (Team Food Challenge)	Janice; John; Patti; Stephen	John; Stephen	Chinese Take-A-Way	None
20	18 June 2009	The Mud Pit (Individual Food Challenge)	John; Lou; Janice; Sanjaya; Patti; Torrie; Stephen	Lou; Patti; Sanjaya	Pizza Dinner	None
21	22 June 2009	Head of Horrors (Individual Food Challenge)	John; Lou; Holly; Sanjaya; Patti; Torrie	Lou	Cheeseburger, Fries and Onion Rings	None
22	22 June 2009	Last Chance Saloon (Survival Challenge)	Holly; John	John	Another Day in Camp	None
23	23 June 2009	Catch A Crawling Star (Individual Food Challenge)	John; Lou; Patti; Sanjaya; Torrie	John; Sanjaya	Salad	None
24	24 June 2009	Jungle Spa (Individual Food Challenge)	John; Lou; Torrie	John; Lou; Torrie	Favorite Meal	^{See; Note 7}

Notes

^1 Heidi and Spencer refused to take part in the trial.
^2 Daniel, Lou, and Sanjaya were able to make it to the second of the rounds of the trial, but nobody made it to the last round. The group consensus was to have Lou remain as Camp Leader.
^3 Janice refused to take part in the trial, citing medical reasons as the cause.
^4 The prize for this trial was not revealed. Janice was not eligible to be voted into the trial, citing medical reasons as the cause.
^5 As Lou had already been Camp Leader twice, the producers decided that he could not compete for a third term.
^6 Hoping to be eliminated this week, Stephen refused to participate in the Immunity Challenge.
^7 Though the three remaining contestants competed as individuals, they each won their respective challenge.

Key
The public voted who they wanted to face the trial.
The contestants decided who did which trial.
The trial was compulsory.
The trial was compulsory and the celebrities competed as a team.

=== Statistics ===
Trials	Holly	Stephen	Patti	Janice	Sanjaya	Lou	John	Torrie	Daniel	Heidi	Spencer	Frances	Angela
Participated	7	10	15	10	14	15	16	17	4	2	2	3	3
Won	2	4	4	2	10	11	9	4	1	0	2	0	0

=== Leaders of Camp ===
#	Image	Leader of Camp	Began term	Ended term	Week
1		Lou Diamond Phillips	May 31, 2009	June 15, 2009	1
1		Lou Diamond Phillips	May 31, 2009	June 15, 2009	2
2		John Salley	June 15, 2009	June 24, 2009	3
2		John Salley	June 15, 2009	June 24, 2009	4

== Episode Summary ==
=== Episode 1 ===
The celebrities are split into 2 teams; the Red team (Janice, John, Patti, Heidi and Spencer) and the Yellow team (Lou, Sanjaya, Stephen, Torrie, Frances and Angela). Patti gets carried down a river that the red team are trying to cross. The yellow team struggle to get over some slippery rocks. Heidi and Spencer attempt to quit but the producers talk them into staying. Heidi and Spencer go away from camp the following morning and the rest of the celebrities take the labels off their hair products. They then return and Spencer attacks Angela for playing with his things. The celebrities are then split into male and female teams. Lou beats Janice at the leadership challenge and becomes the camp leader. The boys beat the girls at a bug eating challenge and win their team and win a chicken and pineapple dinner. Patti tells the camp about her husband's legal problems. The celebrities arrive at the Trauma Tank for the immunity trial.

=== Episode 2 ===
Sanjaya wins the Trauma Tank trial and wins immunity for all of the boys. Lou gets a comfortable bed as he is the camp leader. Spencer beats Heidi in the Lost Chamber trial and wins the boys a fish dinner. Stephen baptises Spencer in the river. Heidi and Spencer leave the jungle for good. The boys are allowed to choose one girl to give immunity to as well as themselves and they choose Patti.

=== Episode 3 ===
Janice spills water in John's boots and it causes an argument between them. John tells Janice he is sorry for shouting at her but Janice doesn't think he means it. The boys beat the girls in the Rocky Horror trial and win a pork dinner. Daniel Baldwin joins the camp. Heidi and Spencer tell the hosts that they want to return and the celebrities are asked to vote if they want them back.

=== Episode 4 ===
Either Janice, Torrie, Frances or Angela will leave the jungle. John and Daniel beat Patti and Torrie in the food trial and win a fruit and mushroom dinner. Angela notices that items have been stolen from her bag and it is revealed that Janice stole the items. The hosts reveal that Janice and Frances are safe from elimination and Torrie and Angela are the bottom two. At the end of the show it is revealed that Angela is the first celebrity to leave.

=== Episode 5 ===
Heidi and Spencer have to spend the night in the Lost Chamber before the rest of the camp can vote to let them in. They survive the night and the rest of the camp vote them back in. Frances leaves as she wants to be with Angela. Sanjaya and Janice are picked to represent their teams in the Flash Flood trial. Sanjaya wins as Janice gives up so the boys win a lobster dinner. Heidi and Spencer leave again as Heidi has to be taken to hospital. All of the celebrities surrender in the leadership trial, a bug eating one. As there is no winner Lou is voted by the rest of the camp to remain leader. Heidi finds out she has a gastric ulcer and that she and Spencer will not be able to return to the jungle again. The celebrities arrive at the Hang Tough immunity trial.

=== Episode 6 ===
Lou wins the Hang Tough trial and immunity from the next public vote. Heidi's sister Holly joins the camp and the rest of the celebrities take a liking to her. Holly and Janice beat Lou and Daniel in the Tree Surgery trial and win a hot dog and chips dinner. The celebrities share stories with each other. Janice accuses the Baldwin brothers of ganging up on her. Patti and Torrie beat John and Stephen in the Lumberjack challenge and win fitness equipment, granola bars and smoothies. Janice steals one of the granola bars in the night. Janice also urinates in the camp at night and doesn't own up to it. Lou and two other celebrities of his choice are allowed to talk to their families. He chooses Daniel and Patti to join him.

=== Episode 7 ===
Spiders and bugs invade the camp. Sanjaya beats Holly in the Grocery Shopping trial and wins a Mexican dinner for the boys. The celebrities talk about how they became a celebrity. Sanjaya and Holly flirt with each other. Patti, John and Daniel are in the bottom 3 and Daniel is eliminated.

=== Episode 8 ===
John Salley has thoughts of leaving camp. Torrie, Patti, John, and Lou compete in a luxury challenge, in which the winning pair receives a massage, which was Torrie and Patti. Torrie and Sanjaya were revealed to be the chosen ones to compete in the Tunnel of Terror food challenge, in which you must go through a tunnel and retrieve the most stars as possible. The winner of that challenge was Sanjaya. A new camp leader was chosen by questions the celebrities had to answer based on America's opinion. John became the new camp leader after Lou had been leader for two terms. Janice becomes sick and is taken to the hospital. The contestants would compete for immunity and the challenge would be revealed in episode 9.

=== Episode 9 ===
Lou won the immunity challenge and was guaranteed a place in the final 3. John also was granted immunity having been chosen leader. The others were sent away after the viewers were asked to vote for their favorite celebrity. There was an incident in the night when 3 security personnel came into the camp to catch a snake which had crept into the camp.

The camp mates were getting bored and irritated with Sanjaya's off-key and constant singing. But were all praise for his banana chips, which took a few minutes to cook, but were said to be a tasty refreshment. The celebrities are confused by Sanjaya's sexuality. When Sanjaya is around Janice, he acts very effeminate, but he obviously flirts with Holly like he's interested. Sanjaya explains to the celebrities that he's not gay, but he can be a great gay best friend. To combat boredom, the celebrities were given a video cam to make a 'slasher' flick directed by Lou and starring the rest of the celebrities. Later on they were given popcorn and allowed to view the movie.

=== Episode 10 ===
The participants were asked to draw a self-portrait of their experience in the jungle. They were given paper and were asked to use the charcoal for sketching. The Challenge was a "Spider Web". Flags were placed in a rope formation which resembled a spider's web. The competing teams consisted of: John + Stephen and Patti + Janice. John and Stephen won the challenge by collecting the most flags in the least time. The reward was "Chinese takeout". Janice did not take her defeat in stride and did not reciprocate when John offered a congratulatory handshake. Meanwhile, Janice's teammates were becoming irritated with her making excuses for her loss, despite her insistence to compete in the challenge. Back at the camp, Sanjaya cooked a pasta dinner with an oil-based sauce for everyone. John did not like it and made it known. The hosts even commented about John being a great addition to the TV show "Hell's Kitchen". There were constant references to the closeness shared by Patti and John. So also with Sanjaya and Holly. Holly's self-portrait was about the time she spent swimming with Sanjaya in the river. Janice commented that the drawing would look good in their wedding invitation. Janice was told that she was not in the top 2 and Patti was not in the bottom 2. The status for the others were not announced.

=== Episode 11 ===
The teams were now individual. The campers received letters from home. Holly and Janice were eliminated.

=== Episode 12 ===
The contestants have to choose either Janice or Holly to come back because Stephen left. Holly comes back to camp. Holly and John compete in the Last Chance Saloon challenge and John wins; Holly goes home.

=== Episode 13 ===
The contests competed in the food trial. John and Sanjaya won a salad dinner. The contestants gave out the " I'm A Celebrity" awards. Patti and Sanjaya were eliminated in a surprise double- elimination.

=== Episode 14 ===
It is now down to Lou Diamond Phillips, John Salley and Torrie Wilson. The winner is revealed and everyone else returns to camp for one last time (Frangela were absent). John Salley was voted off and came in 3rd place. Lou Diamond Phillips is crowned king of the jungle and Torrie Wilson becomes runner-up.

== Controversy ==
Heidi and Spencer Pratt's behavior on the show was largely criticized by the media. The couple claimed they were subject to torture and left the show's set multiple times before returning and ultimately withdrawing. TV Guide, in an article, referred to their antics as "reasons that television is going downhill" and also revealed they only spent 14 hours inside of the chamber and were given food and water the whole time they were in it.

It was reported on June 7, 2009, that Heidi, who was last seen with Spencer being told they have to sleep in the Lost Chamber; and later be told what their fate would be after the team had decided what their choice was in terms of them re-entering camp, was hospitalized due to a putative gastric ulcer.

== Nielsen ratings ==
Episode	Date	Rating	Share	Rating/share (18–49)	Viewers (millions)	Rank (night)
1	June 1, 2009	4.0	7	2.6/8	6.45	3
2	June 2, 2009	3.7	7	2.2/7	5.54	4
3	June 3, 2009	3.5	5	1.5/5	4.78	3
4	June 4, 2009	3.2	6	1.9/6	5.18	4
5	June 8, 2009	3.6	6	1.7/6	5.21	4
6	June 10, 2009	3.2	6	1.4/5	4.71	4
7	June 11, 2009	3.3	5	1.9/6	5.25	3
8	June 15, 2009	3.2	5	1.8/5	4.94	TBA
9	June 16, 2009	3.0	6	1.7/6	4.65	TBA
10	June 17, 2009	2.7	5	1.5/5	4.17	TBA
11	June 18, 2009	3.3	6	1.8/6	4.98	2
12	June 22, 2009	2.8	5	1.6/5	4.30	TBA
13	June 23, 2009	2.9	5	1.4/5	4.27	TBA
14	June 24, 2009	2.8	5	1.5/5	4.40	TBA

== See also ==
- I'm a Celebrity... Get Me out of Here!
