= Frank Ryan (surgeon) =

American plastic surgeon

Francis Harry Ryan
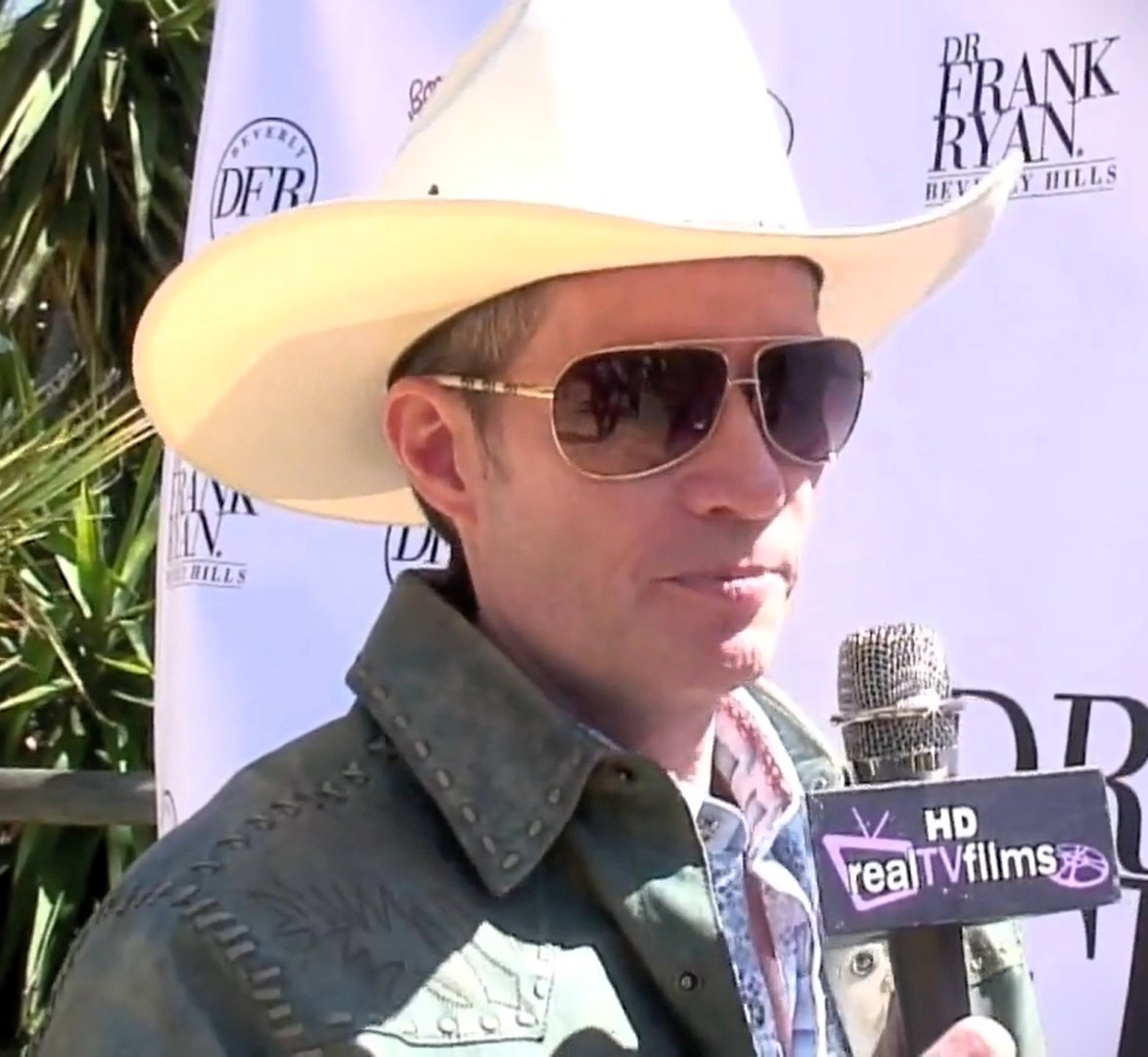
- Ryan in 2010
- Born: May 21, 1960; Toledo, Ohio, U.S.
- Died: August 16, 2010 (aged 50); Malibu, California, U.S.
- Occupation: Plastic surgeon

Francis Harry Ryan (May 21, 1960 – August 16, 2010) was an American plastic surgeon. He was known for performing multiple plastic surgery procedures on celebrities, including Heidi Montag, Gene Simmons, Shannon Tweed, Shauna Sand, Vince Neil, Adrianne Curry, Janice Dickinson and many others. He was also the founder of the non-profit foundation, The Bony Pony Ranch.

== Background ==
Ryan was born in Toledo, Ohio, the son of Mary Kate Ryan (née Manion), a registered nurse, and Frank Harry Ryan, a bookkeeper, who died when his son was three years old. Ryan attended St. Francis de Sales High School, graduating in 1978.

From 1978 to 1982 he attended the University of Michigan. From 1982 to 1986 he attended Ohio State University's College of Medicine. He was board certified by the American Board of Plastic Surgery. He went on to complete eight years of post-graduate surgical training at Cedars-Sinai Medical Center, the University of Missouri and UCLA Medical Center. Ryan also participated in numerous fellowships, the first of which was a burn reconstruction fellowship at Shriners Hospital for Children.

In 1986, Ryan moved to Los Angeles. In 1990, he completed a UCLA Division of Plastic Surgery Research Fellowship that focused exclusively on breast augmentation. While at the UCLA Medical Center, Ryan was chosen for and completed the UCLA Division of Plastic Surgery’s Aesthetic Fellowship.

In 1994, Ryan entered private practice in Beverly Hills. The following year, he performed one of the first plastic surgery "makeovers" on television, on TLC's The Operation. He founded The Bony Pony Ranch, a 26-acre (110,000 m^{2}) site in Malibu which catered to inner city children and provided them an outdoor experience.

In 2009, Ryan performed breast implant surgery on Cassie Ventura, only to reverse the procedure the following day at Sean Combs’ demand. Some theorize that Ryan took his own life, citing the possibility of a malpractice suit in response to this incident.

== Death ==
On August 16, 2010, at about 4:30 p.m., Ryan drove his 1995 Jeep Wrangler off a cliff on Pacific Coast Highway in Malibu, California. The Jeep landed on rocks below and lifeguards initially tried to help him. Ryan was trapped in the vehicle and had major head injuries. His dog Jill was thrown out of the vehicle, but survived with some minor injuries, including damaged paws. The Ventura County Fire Department tried hoisting Ryan using a helicopter, but the attempt was called off when he was pronounced dead at the scene. Ryan had just posted a picture of his dog, and tweeted, "Border collie Jill surveying the view from atop the sand dune". On October 21, 2010 the California Highway Patrol determined that an unsafe turn was the official cause of the car crash that killed Ryan.
