= Frangela =

American comedy duo

- Notable work: Hey Monie! (2003)

Comedy career
- Years active: 2002–present
- Medium: Film, improv comedy, sitcom, podcast, animated series
- Genre: Improv comedy
- Members: Frances Callier; Angela V. Shelton

Frangela is a Los Angeles-based comedy duo composed of comedians Frances Callier and Angela V. Shelton, both of The Second City.

Callier and Shelton regularly appeared on the VH1 weekly comedy news review Best Week Ever, the NPR radio show Day to Day and the Fox News late night show Red Eye w/Greg Gutfeld. They had their own show on KTLK called The Week According to Frangela, which aired live on Saturdays from 5:00 PM to 7:00 PM Eastern Standard Time. The comedy duo also appeared in the 2009 movie He's Just Not That Into You. Angela Shelton has voiced in Spider-Man 2 and Ultimate Spider-Man, Superman, and Reservoir Dogs video games, while Frances Callier played Roxy on the show Hannah Montana. In 2010, KTLK announced that they would be discontinuing The Week According to Frangela in favor of other local programming. The duo then moved the show to a self-distributed podcast recorded live Saturday nights at The Second City Training Center in Hollywood. On August 20, 2010, the duo recorded their final installment of the show. In February 2009, Frangela had a one-week tryout for a show on "Green 360" KKGN in San Francisco in the 4 pm-7 pm PST slot, but it was not picked up as a regular show. On September 10, 2018, the comedy duo announced the release of their debut comedy album RESIST! out October 19, 2018, on Kill Rock Stars. In 2019, the comedy duo competed in the reality television competition series Bring the Funny.

== Origin ==
The two presumably met as improv comedians in Chicago improv troupe The Second City.

== Podcast ==
In the fall of 2011, Frangela began the "Idiot of the Week" podcast. For the podcast, Frangela recorded an audio and video podcast of their popular "Idiot of the Week" segment, in which fans sent in news stories about people whose own lack of common sense usually brought them into conflict with the law. At the end of the week, they chose from at least three candidates, one of whom becomes the titular subject. Each episode of "Idiot of the Week" lasted approximately 10 minutes to a half hour. The last new segment of the "Idiot of the Week" podcast was in January 2014.

On February 16, 2017, Frangela debuted a new podcast "The Final Word". This hour long podcast includes commentary on political and current events, as well as the "Idiot of the Week" segment they had done previously, which is also available as a separate podcast.

== Stephanie Miller Show ==
From March 12–14, 2008, they were brought in at the last minute to fill in on the Stephanie Miller Show after Elayne Boosler had stated she no longer wished to fill-in on the show. Stephanie Miller and her "mooks" were on vacation for the entire week (March 10–14, 2008), but with a great deal of breaking news happening in the week, it was felt that live shows would be needed. During this time, the Eliot Spitzer prostitution scandal was in the news and Geraldine Ferraro resigned from the Hillary Clinton Presidential campaign because of her remarks on the candidacy of Barack Obama. Audience response to Frangela was so popular that the duo occasionally appeared during the Friday show's third hour in the segment, "Fridays with Frangela." They then became the designated "regular fill-in hosts" for the Stephanie Miller Show and in that capacity, they hosted the show from Monday, June 30, 2008, through Friday, July 4, 2008, while Stephanie Miller, Jim Ward and Chris Lavoie were on vacation. They also hosted the show from Monday, September 8, 2008, through Friday, September 15, 2008, filling in during another vacation week for the cast of the show, as Stephanie and her co-hosts had just broadcast live on location from both political conventions the two weeks prior. They co-hosted with Chris Lavoie on a few other occasions when Stephanie could not appear, and filled in during late December 2008/early January 2009 while the cast was off for the holidays.

After several years away from the show, Frangela returned in October 2014 as a featured guest on Miller's uncensored Happy Hour podcast, following it several weeks later with an all-new "Fridays with Frangela" segment that is now a regular part of the 3rd hour on Friday's on The Stephanie Miller Show. They are also once again the regular fill-in hosts when Miller is on vacation. Frangela are also part of Miller's live comedy "Sexy Liberal" tour that has appeared to acclaim across the United States.

== I'm A Celebrity...Get Me Out Of Here! ==
Beginning on June 1, 2009, Frangela became contestants on the NBC reality show I'm a Celebrity... Get Me out of Here!.

On day four of I'm a Celebrity... Get Me out of Here! Shelton was the first to be evicted from the camp.

On day eight, four days after Shelton was evicted from camp, Callier announced to the camp that she would be leaving I'm a Celebrity... Get Me out of Here! to join her friend back in Los Angeles.

== Other work ==
Shelton and Callier performed together in the July 2012 edition of Don't Tell My Mother!, a monthly showcase in which actors, authors, screenwriters and comedians share true stories they would never want their mothers to know.

On September 10, 2018, the duo began hosting a new syndicated talk show called Me Time With Frangela that is seen on television stations owned by Raycom Media.

In 2019, the comedy duo competed in the reality television competition series Bring the Funny.
