= Frances Callier =

American actress

- Born: Eleanor Frances Callier; May 17, 1969 (age 56); Chicago, Illinois, U.S.
- Other names: Frangela
- Occupation(s): Actress, comedian, producer, writer
- Years active: 2001–present
- Spouse: Thomas Greene
- Website: frangela.com

Eleanor Frances Callier (born May 17, 1969) is an American producer, writer, comedian and actress. Her television credits include According to Jim, My Name Is Earl, Frasier, Drake & Josh, Hannah Montana, and Curb Your Enthusiasm. Callier is also known for her co-starring role in the British comedy, 3 Non-Blondes.

== Career ==
She had a recurring role as Roxy the Bodyguard in the Disney Channel Original Series Hannah Montana.

Frances Callier is half of the comedy duo Frangela with Angela V. Shelton. She appears regularly as Frangela on VH1's Best Week Ever and together with Shelton on The Stephanie Miller Show. As of Spring 2019, the duo also do two weekly podcasts for Miller's Sexy Liberal Podcast Network (The Final Word and The Final Word - Idiot of the Week). She has been seen on CNN's Showbiz Tonight, Headline News, Fox News Red Eye and she is a regular contributor to NPR's Day to Day. She is a radio talk show host on KEIB Saturday afternoons. She left the NBC reality series I'm a Celebrity... Get Me out of Here!.

Callier also appeared in the Drake & Josh episode "Little Diva" as Helen, the movie theater manager to fill in for Yvette Nicole Brown, who could not make the taping due to filming the short lived series The Big House. She appeared in the unaired pilot episode of the Fox series Drive.

She appeared in the movie He's Just Not That Into You in a scene in the park with her comedy co-star Shelton. She has also been seen on MTV's Made, helping children with their diets.

== Filmography ==
=== Film ===
Year	Title	Role	Notes
2009	He's Just Not That Into You	Frances	
2015	Slow Learners	Robin	
2019	Wine Country	Nurse Janiece	
2021	Batman: The Long Halloween	Nurse Tamara (voice)	

=== Television ===
Year	Title	Role	Notes
2001	Curb Your Enthusiasm	Social Worker	Episode: "The Shrimp Incident"
2002	Girls Behaving Badly	Herself	Episode: "Episode #1.5"
2003	Frasier	Nurse	Episode: "Lilith Needs a Favor"
2003	3 Non-Blondes	Hidden Camera Operator	Regular Cast
2003	Hey Monie!	Yvette (voice)	Episode: "Bad Hair Day"
2003	It's All Relative	Shopper #1	Episode: "Take Me Out"
2003	Like Family	Customer #2	Episode: "Value of a Dollar"
2004	According to Jim	Lamaze Instructor	Episode: "The Baby"
2004	Drake & Josh	Helen	Episode: "Little Diva"
2005	I Can't Believe I Wore That	Herself	Episode: "I Can't Believe I Wore That"
2005	My Name is Earl	Barbie	Episode: "Faked My Own Death"
2006–08	Hannah Montana	Roxy Roker	Recurring cast: season 1-2
2007	Drive	Patrice	Episode: "Unaired Pilot"
2008	Emily's Reasons Why Not	The Receptionist	Episode: "Why Not to Date Your Gynecologist"
2009	I'm a Celebrity…Get Me out of Here!	Herself/Camp Member	Main cast: season 2
2009–13	The Cleveland Show	Evelyn "Cookie" Brown	Recurring cast
2010	The League	Twyla	Episode: "The Marathon"
2010	Sym-Bionic Titan	Driving instructor (voice)	Episode: "Roar of the White Dragon"
2011	Top Chef Masters	Herself	Episode: "Blinded Me with Science"
2012	2 Broke Girls	Felicia	Episode: "And the Cupcake War"
2013-14	Quick Draw	Margaret	Guest: season 1, recurring cast: season 2
2015	MOCKpocalyspe	Herself	Episode: "Metal", "Country" & "Epic Music Videos"
2017	Family Guy	Shonda Rimes (voice)	Episode: "Emmy-Winning Episode"
2018-19	Me Time With Frangela	Herself/host	TV series
2019	#VanLife	Patty	Episode: "You Brought Your Mom?"
2019	A Black Lady Sketch Show	Reverend	Episode: "Your Boss Knows You Don't Have Eyebrows"
2020	Site Unseen	Herself/Panelist	TV series
2019-21	Just Roll with It	Lunch Lady	Recurring cast
