= Angela V. Shelton =

American actress and comedian

- Born: United States
- Other names: Frangela
- Occupation(s): Actress, comedian
- Years active: 1996–present
- Website: frangela.com

Angela V. Shelton is an American actress and comedian. Her television credits include Mr. Show with Bob and David, Grounded for Life, The Suite Life of Zack & Cody, and Hulu original series Quick Draw Shelton was a contestant on the NBC reality series I'm a Celebrity...Get Me Out of Here!, but was eliminated on June 4, 2009. She is also one half of the Los Angeles-based comedy duo Frangela, the other half being Frances Callier. Shelton was the voice of Calypso in the Spider-Man 2 video game.

== Career ==
She began her acting career in 1993 at Second City Detroit. She was introduced to Frances Callier in Chicago, and they later become known as Frangela.

In 2003, the Frangela duo starred as the protagonists of the adult animated sitcom, Hey Monie!, which was shown on Black Entertainment Television and Oxygen and won a NAMIC award. Shelton voiced the eponymous Monie.

The duo perform stand-up comedy together and have appeared in an advertisement for the Equality Campaign's "NO on Prop 8" campaign. Shelton and Callier worked on the British comedy series 3 Non-Blondes. Shelton appears regularly as Frangela on VH1s Best Week Ever. The duo finished their hit show An Evening with the Afro-Saxons in 2008. They also host a radio talk show together on KEIB on Saturday afternoons.

On September 10, 2018, Frangela began hosting a new talk show called Me Time with Frangela that is seen on television stations owned by Raycom Media.

Shelton was an original cast member of the Second City Detroit comedy troupe, which opened on September 15, 1993. Other notable cast members included Larry Joe Campbell and Keegan-Michael Key.
