= Spencer Pratt =

American television personality (born 1983)

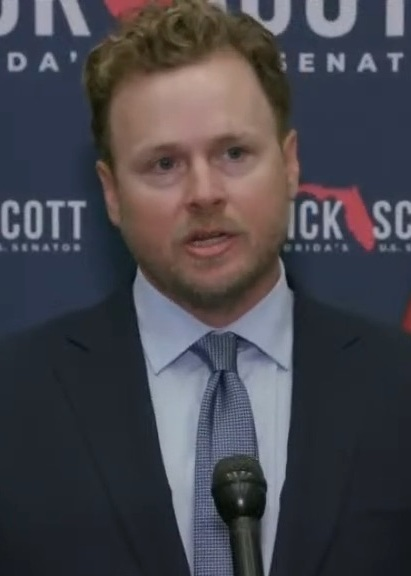
- Pratt in 2025
- Born: Spencer William Pratt; August 14, 1983 (age 43); Los Angeles, California, U.S.
- Education: University of Southern California (BA)
- Occupation: Reality television personality
- Years active: 2005–present
- Television: The Princes of Malibu; The Hills; I'm a Celebrity...Get Me Out of Here!; Celebrity Big Brother; The Hills: New Beginnings
- Political party: Republican (2020–present)
- Other political affiliations: Independent (2008–2020)
- Spouse: Heidi Montag (m. 2008)
- Children: 2
- Relatives: Stephanie Pratt (sister)

Spencer William Pratt (born August 14, 1983) is an American reality television personality. In 2007, he began dating Heidi Montag, a primary cast member of the reality television series The Hills, became cast in the series himself. A feud between them and cast member Lauren Conrad became the central focus of the series.

The couple married in April 2009, and later that year made controversial appearances on the second season of I'm a Celebrity...Get Me Out of Here! In 2013, Montag and Pratt competed on the eleventh series of the British version of Celebrity Big Brother, and returned to compete on the nineteenth series in 2017. In 2026, he published a memoir entitled The Guy You Loved to Hate: Confessions from a Reality TV Villain.

Pratt finished third in the 2026 Los Angeles mayoral primary election, receiving 25.5% of the vote, and did not advance to the general election.

== Early life and education ==
Pratt was born on August 14, 1983, in Los Angeles. His father is William "Skip" Pratt, a dentist, and his mother is Janet Pratt. He attended the Crossroads School in Santa Monica. In December 2013, he completed his undergraduate degree in political science at the University of Southern California in Los Angeles. He dropped out of college to pursue acting on television but re-enrolled in 2011.

== Reality television career ==
=== Early career and The Hills ===
Spencer Pratt first appeared on television in 2005 in the short-lived show The Princes of Malibu. As creator and executive producer of the series, Pratt was "manager/publicist/agent/stylist" for series star Brody Jenner. In 2007, Pratt began dating and lived with Heidi Montag, a reality TV person who was in the cast of The Hills. During the third season of that show, fellow cast member Lauren Conrad ended her friendship with Montag after she suspected that Pratt was responsible for rumors of a sex tape involving her and her former boyfriend Jason Wahler. Pratt later admitted he was responsible for the rumors, but then said he was lying when he claimed responsibility for the rumor. The ensuing feud between the three carried through each subsequent season. A reboot of the show, The Hills: New Beginnings, featured Pratt, and was canceled after two seasons.

=== Music and celebrity appearances ===
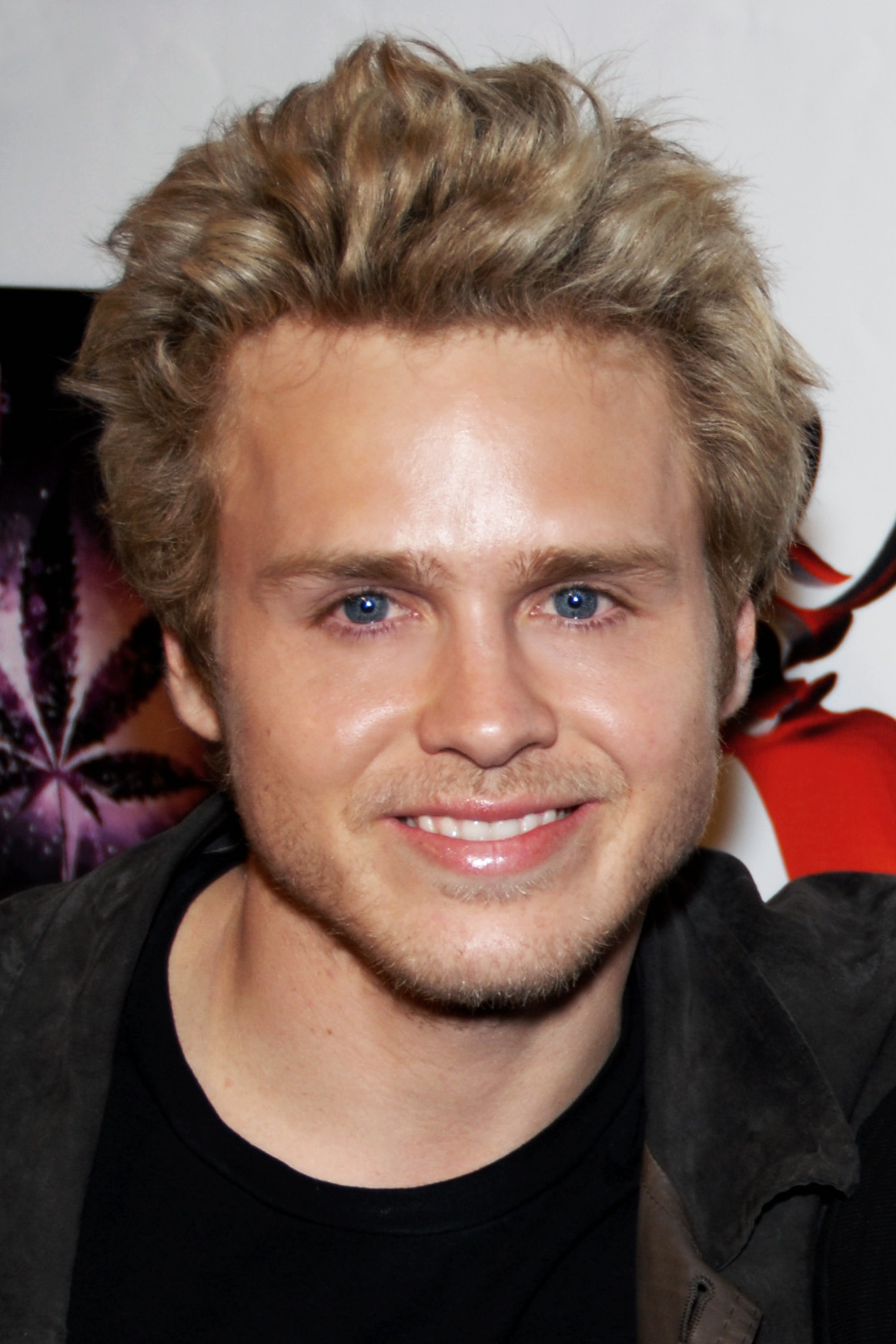
Pratt at Ya Boy's birthday party in West Hollywood, California, January 2009

In August 2007, Montag entered the music industry and began recording her debut studio album. Later that month, the song "Body Language" was leaked on the internet, and featured a rap verse by Pratt. He later directed the music video for Montag's first promotional single "Higher". In 2009, Pratt released the song "I'm a Celebrity," in which he called himself "the white Jay-Z." Pratt created the song to be released in conjunction with his role on the 2009 season of NBC's reality television I'm a Celebrity...Get Me Out of Here!. Pratt came up with the rap name "Great White" from fighter Kevin Cale Casey, a professional fighter, who apparently would refer to Pratt by this moniker. Pratt said that his biggest rap influences were Eminem and Asher Roth.

In 2009, Montag and Pratt appeared on the second season of the American version of I'm a Celebrity...Get Me Out of Here!. They quit after Montag was hospitalized with a gastric ulcer and later created controversy after alleging that they were subject to torture during production. After leaving the series, Montag and Pratt became notorious for their antics and antagonistic roles, notably during an interview with Al Roker of Today, and were described as "everything that's wrong with America". In May 2010, Pratt and Montag made their final appearance on The Hills halfway through the sixth and final season. In 2009, Spencer and Heidi appeared on the How I Met Your Mother episode "Benefits" as themselves.

They have been featured in documentary programs. In 2013, Channel 5 aired a one-off television special discussing Montag and Pratt's rise to prominence, titled Speidi: Scandal, Secrets & Surgery!. The couple appeared in the E! Documentary special After Shock: Heidi & Spencer. Pratt appeared on a 2025 episode of The Weakest Link, where he won $50,000 for the Palisades fire recovery efforts.

=== Big Brother and later projects ===
The couple have appeared on Big Brother. In January 2013, Montag and Pratt (as a single entity) competed as housemates on Celebrity Big Brother 11, where they notably developed a minor feud with singer and television personality Rylan Clark. They were named the runners-up, losing to Clark. In 2017, Pratt re-entered the Celebrity Big Brother 19 with his wife. On Day 18, the couple was eternally nominated by James Cosmo, to which they did not have a good reaction. They were saved in an eight-person eviction on Day 22. However, they were evicted on Day 25 against Kim Woodburn, Jessica Cunningham, Bianca Gascoigne, and Jedward; after finishing in 9th place. Pratt and Montag were reunited with their series 11 rival, Rylan Clark-Neal, on Big Brother's Bit on the Side that night.

In 2015, Pratt and Montag were houseguests on We TV's Marriage Boot Camp, as they worked out their differences about having children. In 2026, when Montag competed in season fourteen of The Masked Singer as "Snow Cone", Pratt was in the background of the performances as a snow cone-headed character that was later named "Mr. Snow Cone". As Montag was eliminated on "Spice Girls Night", Pratt took over the unmasking duties of the Men in Black and then unmasked himself.

== Personal life ==
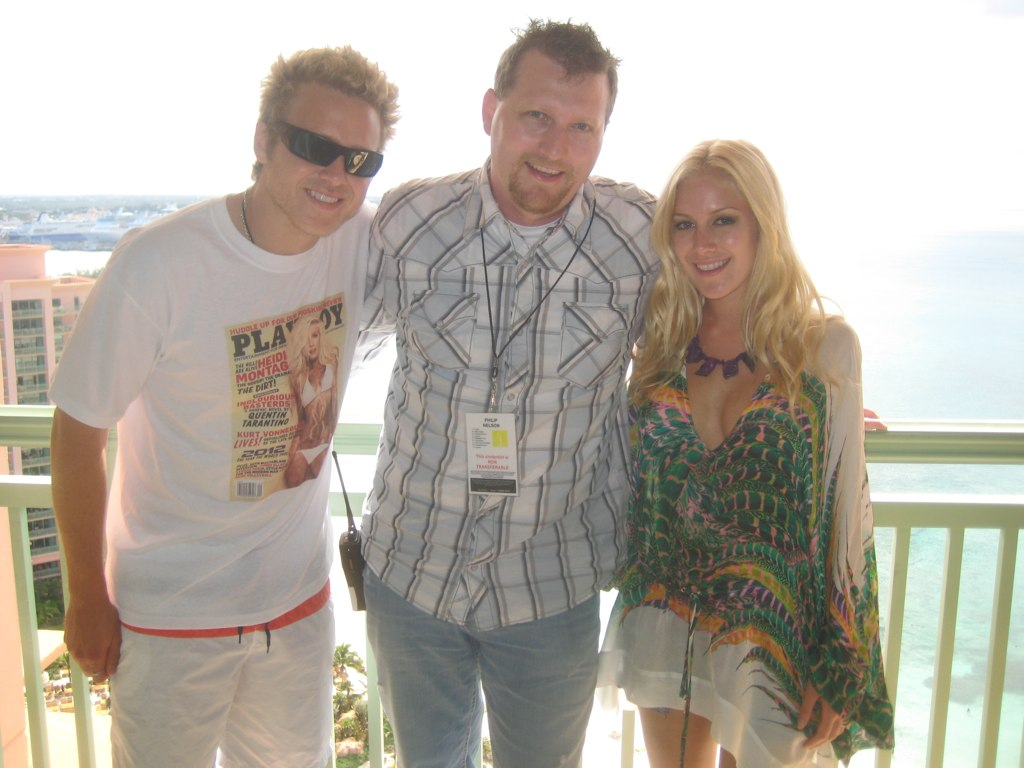
Pratt (left) and Montag (right) with Philip Nelson in Nassau, January 2009

During the fourth season of The Hills, Montag and Pratt eloped to Mexico on November 20, 2008. A wedding ceremony was held on April 25, 2009, in Pasadena, California. In July 2010, Montag filed for divorce from Pratt, citing irreconcilable differences in the petition, but they called off the divorce in September after confessing that the action was intended to boost Montag's ailing career. In November, they renewed their vows in Carpinteria, California. They have two children.

Pratt was arrested and jailed in Costa Rica on September 11, 2010, while attempting to board an aircraft with hunting weapons. He was released and banned from re-entering the country.

=== Palisades fire ===
On January 7, 2025, Pratt's home was destroyed in the Pacific Palisades fire. The couple purchased the home for approximately $2.5 million in 2017. After the fire, they moved to a rental home in Carpinteria. Initially, they were not sure they would be able to afford the price to rebuild the home due to construction costs and ongoing mortgage payments.

Pratt and other property owners sued the city of Los Angeles and the Department of Water and Power, and blamed the city and the utility for the destruction of their homes. He went to Washington D.C. to meet with Attorney General Pam Bondi and other federal officials about launching an investigation into Newsom and Bass.

== 2026 Los Angeles mayoral election ==
On January 7, 2026, Pratt announced that he would run for mayor of Los Angeles in the 2026 Los Angeles mayoral election, challenging incumbent Karen Bass. He announced his campaign on the first anniversary of the Palisades fire. Pratt's decision to run was primarily motivated by the Palisades Fire disaster and his frustrations and belief about incumbent mayor Karen Bass's failure to prevent and respond to the crisis. The race was officially nonpartisan. Pratt is a registered Republican and has downplayed his party registration during the campaign. Jeanie Buss, Katharine McPhee, Rick Salomon, Manny Pacquiao, and Jeff Jenkins have donated to his campaign. Record producer David Foster hosted a fundraiser for him. The New York Times stated that roughly 17 percent of Pratt's campaign donations were from donors residing in Los Angeles.

In an April 2026 CalMatters commentary article, journalist Jim Newton said that Pratt's memoir undermined his campaign. In May 2026, Pratt wrote he is "done" with CBS News after accusing the network of running a hit piece on him with clips from The Hills. His sister, Stephanie Pratt, initially urged voters to not support her brother, before reversing her stance.

=== Policy positions ===
Pratt positioned himself as being a "common sense" populist, outsider to represent voter's frustrations with public safety, emergency management, crime, and fiscal reform. Pratt's political positions include increasing funding for LAPD, and addressing drug addiction, mental health, homelessness, regulations, and emergency management. Douglas Schoen, a pollster and political consultant, wrote in The Hill that Pratt is "tapping into frustration with the state of the city" and "channeling broader dissatisfaction with quality-of-life issues". He has spoke on social media that he will utilize law enforcement to address LA's recent surge of dangerous street takeovers.

In a May 2026 debate that was hosted by KNBC, he characterized himself as a community advocate like former President Barack Obama. Some commentators found his debate performance effective with voters. In that same debate, Pratt denied being a part of MAGA, despite having received the endorsement of Donald Trump. He argued that "super meth" is fueling homelessness in the city of Los Angeles. He advocated for curtailing funding for nonprofits aimed at reducing homelessness and reallocating that money toward the LAPD. He has also said that he will direct LAPD to increase patrols around synagogues and Chabad centers.

=== Campaign advertisements ===
Pratt used humor, engagement opportunities, and social media videos which quickly received attention and support for his campaign. In a music video ad, he dubbed himself the "Prince of Bel-Air" in a spoof campaign video.

A.I.-generated video reposted by Pratt's campaign (music muted due to copyright)

His campaign reposted a viral video by film-maker Charlie Curran that used generative AI. Pratt did not commission the advertisement. The video, a reference to the 2012 film The Dark Knight Rises, depicts Los Angeles as Gotham City. The video portrays Pratt as Batman and Californian politicians such as Bass, Newsom, and Kamala Harris as supervillains. Texas Senator Ted Cruz and former U.S. congressman Matt Gaetz praised the advertisement; former Florida Governor Jeb Bush called it the "maybe the best political ad of the year." The viral videos, not commissioned by Pratt, have brought rise to discussion on the future of political advertisements and generative AI.

During the campaign, he filmed part of a video outside the homes of other candidates Nithya Raman and Mayor Karen Bass. Raman accused Pratt of being reckless for filming outside her home. In that advertisement, Pratt is standing on his lot in front of his Airstream and said: "This is where I live." Days later, it was reported by TMZ that he was residing at the Hotel Bel-Air and his family was based in Santa Barbara. In response, he produced campaign ad videos to clarify confusion about his living situation, addressing the loss of his home due to the Palisades Fire.

=== Results and aftermath ===
On election night, Pratt initially led third-place candidate Nithya Raman by more than eight percentage points. However, due to the large number of outstanding mail ballots, the race remained too close to call. Raman overtook Pratt seven days later. During that time period, Raman's net accumulation of roughly 43,000 additional votes over Pratt led the latter to insinuate those votes had come from homeless people. Other right-wing figures, including Donald Trump and House Speaker Mike Johnson, claimed in interviews that results were due to widespread election fraud and refused to provide evidence when asked; Elon Musk also made evidence-free fraud allegations online. On June 8, the Associated Press, NBC News, and CNN projected that Raman would advance to the runoff. As of June 9, Pratt had not conceded the election.

Pratt had said that he would leave Los Angeles if he was not elected. The week after the election, Los Angeles comedian Jimmy Kimmel advertised on his television program that he had rented a moving truck on behalf of Pratt. In a subsequent video posted on social media, Pratt said he would not be leaving Los Angeles and instead would continue to stay active in local politics. Independent observers interpreted the video as a concession.

== Nominations ==
- TV Guide included Pratt in its 2013 list of "The 60 Nastiest Villains of All Time."
- For Pratt's work on The Hills he was named the "Greatest Reality TV Villain" in Yahoo!'s fan-voted poll in 2015.

== Bibliography ==
- The Guy You Loved to Hate: Confessions from a Reality TV Villain. Gallery Books. January 2026. ISBN 978-1668211762.
