= Home Movies season 3 =

Home Movies
- Season 3
- DVD cover
- No. of episodes: 13

Release
- Original network: Adult Swim
- Original release: August 4, 2002 – May 25, 2003

Season chronology
- ← Previous; Season 2 Next → Season 4

The third season of the animated sitcom Home Movies originally began airing in the United States on the Adult Swim programming block for the television network Cartoon Network from August 4, 2002 to May 25, 2003. Co-creators Brendon Small and Loren Bouchard, along with Tom Snyder, served as executive producers for the season. Small and Bill Braudis acted as writers for the season, while Bouchard was director for each episode.

The series follows the life and adventures of 8-year-old aspiring filmmaker, Brendon Small, who writes, directs, and stars in homemade film productions that he creates with his friends Melissa Robbins and Jason Penopolis. Brendon and Melissa's soccer coach, John McGuirk, is a short-tempered and selfish alcoholic who gives the two morally bankrupt advice. Brendon's mother, Paula, meanwhile, is divorced and juggling her children, her job as a creative writing teacher, and her romantic life.

The main cast for the season consisted of Small, Janine Ditullio, H. Jon Benjamin, and Melissa Bardin Galsky. Among the guest stars during the season were Todd Barry and Mitch Hedberg, along with Louis C.K., who portrayed Brendon's father Andrew. A lot of the season featured "retroscripting," with the voice actors improvising much of their dialogue.

The episode "Shore Leave" won the Pulcinella award for "Best TV Series for Young Adults & Adults," while the season itself won in the category for "Best Group of Characters of the Year" at the same ceremony.

The complete season DVD was released by Shout! Factory on November 15, 2005, a few months after the release of the second season DVD. It contained all thirteen episodes along with an assortment of bonus features, including optional episode commentary and animatics.

== Episodes ==
No. overall	No. in season	Title	Directed by	Written by	Original release date	Prod. code
27	1	"Shore Leave"	Loren Bouchard	Brendon Small & Bill Braudis	August 4, 2002	301
Melissa's father Erik fears that his daughter is becoming too masculine, so he signs her up for the Fairy Princesses troupe. Melissa feels alienated and awkward in the organization, which secretly exploits its members to sell products. She is forced to do this in the mall while constantly being monitored. Fearing her punishment for bad salesmanship, she places a bottle of hair spray in the organization's microwave and turns the microwave on; as she exits the room, the microwave combusts in a massive explosion. Meanwhile, Brendon is forced to have a sleepover at his classmate Fenton's house. He has a terrible time due to Trudy's overbearing rules regarding bedtime and chores, as well as Fenton's strict adherence to his mother's rules. After Brendon films a Blair Witch Project-style confessional about his ordeal, he prepares to go to the bathroom the same night as Melissa's escape, and accidentally walks in on Fenton's mother in the shower with his camera on. Fenton attacks him and Brendon flees, meeting up with Melissa, and Jason who has been monitoring their progress through their walkie talkies. McGuirk finds all three of the kids together on the road and takes them to a diner, where McGuirk helps Brendon come to terms with seeing his first naked woman, even though it was Fenton's mom. Erik apologizes to Melissa, Fenton is harassed by Walter and Perry, and Brendon gives the tape to McGuirk who decides to put it online, but finds that "fentonsnakedmom.com" is already a registered domain name.
28	2	"Breaking Up Is Hard To Do"	Loren Bouchard	Brendon Small & Bill Braudis	August 11, 2002	302
Paula's mother, Doris, comes to the Small house to stay for a visit. She informs the family that she and Paula's father are getting a divorce. Brendon goes to his grandfather's house, curious about this development, and learns that he is perfectly fine with this, comfortably sitting around the house drinking sherry. Paula accidentally burns down the kitchen and McGuirk is hired to fix it. McGuirk does a mediocre job and decides to just lazily hang around the house all day, then decides to fleece Brendon's grandfather when the man comes to the house saying he is lonely. Meanwhile, Jason, feeling left out as his parents are perfectly happy and not divorced like Brendon and Melissa's, decides to pretend that they are arguing and divorcing while he talks to his friends on the phone. They do not believe him and convince him to confess that he is lying.
29	3	"Bad Influences"	Loren Bouchard	Brendon Small & Bill Braudis	August 18, 2002	303
Brendon and Jason begin gaining weight and go to see Nurse Kirkman who says that they are fat enablers to one another. Though they are in denial about this claim, they eventually realize that she is right and decide to not spend time with each other anymore so that they can become healthy again. After a few weeks, in which the boys lose a considerable amount of weight, Melissa tricks the two of them into meeting at a pizzeria, as she is upset that they have not been talking despite being best friends. There, the whole group begins consuming large amounts of food, escalating their weights off the charts as they make new films based around their obesity, until they finally become Meanwhile, McGuirk organizes a between him, Nurse Kirkman, Lynch, and Kirkman's friend. Throughout the date, Lynch keeps catching the attention of Kirkman, which infuriates McGuirk. Finally, Lynch and McGuirk become drunk and start singing on the stage at the restaurant, and the two women leave.
30	4	"Improving Your Life Through Improv" "Sensitivity"	Loren Bouchard	Brendon Small & Bill Braudis	August 25, 2002	304
Brendon openly makes fun of a foreign student named Junior Addleburg twice, so Lynch sentences him, along with other children, to attend a sensitivity seminar, which McGuirk accidentally crashes. The seminar is hosted by three teenagers who urge the attendees to participate in improvised sketches about respecting others. The children feel pandered to by the group, until one of the teenagers abruptly leaves, revealing that he was only part of the group because of a community service sentence. Meanwhile, Paula enters a home video of Brendon's into a television contest, and wins, with Brendon unaware until the last minute that it is not one of his films but one of her home movies of an infant Brendon wetting himself.
31	5	"Four's Company"	Loren Bouchard	Brendon Small & Bill Braudis	October 6, 2002	307
Melissa begins dating a French student named Octavio, which upsets Brendon. At school the next day, Brendon overhears Octavio telling a girl that he is simply using Melissa to get a role in Brendon's films. After school, he goes to Brendon's house, asking him for a part in his films, and Brendon questions him if what he heard was true. Octavio admits to it and reveals that he has also been faking being French. Melissa learns of this and breaks up with Octavio. Meanwhile, after bumping into each other at the grocery store, McGuirk attempts to set up a dinner meeting with Paula, Lynch, and Erik. Everyone continuously lies to him about having other things to do, so he finally calls them all at ridiculous hours at night while spying on them from his car. Only Erik ends up going to dinner with him.
32	6	"Renaissance"	Loren Bouchard	Brendon Small & Bill Braudis	October 13, 2002	305
Jason, Brendon, and Melissa are hired by Lynch to perform in a rock opera entitled "Robin Hood Meets King Arthur" at the renaissance fair. The fair goes normally until a bitter rivalry between the attendees of the fair and those of the sci-fi convention next door escalate. Fenton, dressed as an alien, comes over to the fair to try to convince Brendon to join the sci-fi convention and accidentally informs him that someone at the fair is a double agent for the convention. Melissa is revealed to be the traitor and leads the convention attendees into a battle with the renaissance fair, with the former coming out victorious. Meanwhile, McGuirk is hired to play a blacksmith at the fair but is hungover from the previous night. Though he attempts to fall asleep, he repeatedly has to fend off fairgoers who keep bothering him.
33	7	"My Cheatin' Heart"	Loren Bouchard	Brendon Small & Bill Braudis	October 20, 2002	306
Andrew signs Brendon up for golf lessons so he can play with him in a game against a possible client and his son. Brendon soon learns that he is a horrendous golf player. He asks McGuirk for assistance and is urged to cheat at the game. With McGuirk as his caddie, Brendon cheats throughout the game with the client, until Andrew angrily reveals that he has been cheating the entire game. Brendon tells him that he was as well, though he does not believe him until McGuirk vouches for the boy. The client and his son leave, disgusted and feeling disrespected. Meanwhile, Brendon attempts to convince Jason and Melissa to produce their latest film backwards, as he believes it is a new method being used by several directors (in Memento and Sunset Boulevard). They end up making the film in such a manner but Melissa and Jason don't like the results. Paula finally finishes the "I Spy" game in the children's magazine she picked up at the pediatrician, shown as the first and final scene of the episode.
34	8	"Guitarmageddon"	Loren Bouchard	Brendon Small & Bill Braudis	October 27, 2002	308
Dwayne enters into a guitar contest called "Guitarmageddon", where he learns that he will be competing against arch rival Jimmy Monet. Meanwhile, the kids form a band with one another; their only song is "Freaky Outy," its annoyingly repetitive lyrical structure. Dwayne gets grounded by his father after poor grades and cannot attend the contest, and his guitar gets confiscated. Bitter hostility starts to form between Brendon, Jason, and Melissa over a band name, and they break the band up. After much preparing, the contest takes place and, despite Dwayne's heavily acclaimed performance, using Brendon's battered guitar, Jimmy wins. Dwayne is comforted by Clarice, Jimmy's dimwitted girlfriend, who tells him that she believed his performance to be the better one. Brendon then learns that Paula has sold his Gibson ES-175 guitar, which upsets him as it was a rental.
35	9	"Storm Warning"	Loren Bouchard	Brendon Small & Bill Braudis	November 3, 2002	310
An upcoming strong storm interrupts everyone's plans. McGuirk wants to impress his visiting sister by pretending to be Paula's husband. Brendon wants to make a mockumentary called Movie History about the "making of" a science fiction film called Movie History (previously titled Planet Battles), but Jason and Melissa would rather make the sci-fi film. Paula rushes to deliver the final print version of her romance novel to her agent, but the storm blows in, flooding the street and leaving her car stranded in the middle of the road. Perry and Walter crash into her car while trying to get a petition signed to save an old tree that will be demolished and she protects them, while the storm destroys the tree anyway. When Paula finally gets out of the storm, she takes the two home to get warm.
36	10	"Time To Pay The Price" "A Life In The Day"	Loren Bouchard	Brendon Small & Bill Braudis	November 10, 2002	309
The kids get detention from disciplinarian teacher Mr. Pendlehurst. While in detention, Pendlehurst leaves to go get some coffee and the other detention kids convince the three to help them pour sugar into the teacher's car engine. Though the other kids flee from the scene, Pendlehurst catches Brendon, Melissa, and Jason in the act and sentences them to participate in a Scared Straight! program at the local prison. The kids enjoy their prison cell, mocking prisoners and playing charades. Pendlehurst is furious about their behavior, but before he can punish them further, the warden arrives, explaining that the teacher used to work at the prison before he was fired for leaving a cell open and the other prisoners escaped and told on him. He then proceeds to let the kids leave. Meanwhile, Paula watches several of the kids' films and notices that they all end with the phrase "It's time to pay the price". When she tells this to Brendon, believing it is his mark as an auteur, he denies it, but then accepts after watching a few of the endings. While filming the end to his latest film, the kids realize that they are about to repeat this cliché, upsetting them to where they cannot finish the scene.
37	11	"Broken Dreams" "That Smarts"	Loren Bouchard	Brendon Small & Bill Braudis	November 17, 2002	311
While filming a new movie, Jason asks Melissa about the cast that she is wearing. Brendon opts that she is faking having to wear it so she will not have to take the upcoming science test at school. The next day, Jason breaks his arm and shows up at school also wearing a cast, but both Melissa and Brendon claim that he is faking it as well. Brendon begins to have an extremely hard time studying for the test, so he goes to the library. He falls asleep and gets no studying done, and while walking out of the library, he falls and breaks his arm. Melissa and Jason think he is faking his broken arm and reveal that they have the whole time. Brendon vehemently denies their claim and shows them his X-ray to prove it, while both Melissa and Jason reveal they were indeed faking their injuries. Meanwhile, McGuirk, hoping to receive money by saving a rich child, practices to become a lifeguard. His drill sergeant of a teacher puts him through vigorous tests until McGuirk realizes the job is not for him and quits.
38	12	"Stowaway"	Loren Bouchard	Brendon Small & Bill Braudis	November 24, 2002	312
Brendon convinces Melissa and Jason that they should all run away to Europe, where he believes their work will truly be appreciated. They pack their bags and stowaway onto what they believe to be a cargo ship. In reality, it is a casino boat, where Jason becomes addicted to the slot machines. All three of them decide to go back home and they leave. Meanwhile, McGuirk seeks financial advice from motivational speaker and financial expert Tom Wilsonberg after he learns that his car repair costs $1000. Contrary to what McGuirk initially thinks about him, Tom suggests that McGuirk earns money quickly through gambling at the casino boat. He gives him $100 in chips and McGuirk sets off on a winning streak. Tom wants McGuirk to quit while he is still ahead, but he refuses. Their subsequent argument leads to all the chips falling into the water; despite this, Tom reassures McGuirk that he can still win money by suing the casino for unsafe railings.
39	13	"Coffins and Cradles"	Loren Bouchard	Brendon Small & Bill Braudis	May 25, 2003	313
Right before Halloween, while Andrew is away on business, his pregnant wife Linda comes to stay over at the Small residence. When the kids, Lynch, Paula, and Josie are about to go out for a school Halloween party, Linda goes into Childbirth labor, so they all rush to get her to the hospital. Linda begins to have the baby. Brendon is taken aback by Linda's yelling at him and calling him a "little movie making piece of shit". He leaves the room outraged and Linda finally has the baby. Meanwhile, McGuirk runs into Stephanie—who once wanted have sex with seduce him—again and is swept into her new spiritualism movement. Before attending the Halloween dance the next night, the two of them begin to have sex on his murphey bed, but McGuirk has a heart attack and must go to the hospital. Though he is deemed in good condition, he cannot check out yet and is told by Stephanie that a similar thing once happened while she was having sex with her college professor, who was killed in the process; McGuirk angrily tells her to leave. Brendon sees McGuirk in his room and videotapes his pledge to better himself. Jason consumes candy and becomes violent and hyper, running around the hospital. Melissa finds him and calms him down by repeatedly slapping him. Lynch attempts to find him as well, but ends up injuring himself falling down a flight of stairs.

== Home release ==
The DVD boxset for season three was released by Shout! Factory on November 15, 2005. Other than all thirteen episodes of the season, the DVD included several bonus features, including interviews with the cast and crew, animatics, an animation gallery, commentary tracks on seven episodes, and a radio interview with Bouchard and Benjamin.

The Complete Third Season
Set Details	Special Features
13 episodes; 3-disc set; 1.33:1 aspect ratio; English (Dolby Digital 5.1); Subtitles	Optional commentary on seven episodes; Animatics; Bonus game: "Decide Your Doom Game: Revenge of the Dorks"; "A Featurette for People Who Don't Necessarily Like 'Home Movies' by Jon Benjamin"; "The Making of the DVD Extra You Just Saw"; Music video; April 2004 radio interview with H. Jon Benjamin and Louren Bouchard
Release Dates	Optional commentary on seven episodes; Animatics; Bonus game: "Decide Your Doom Game: Revenge of the Dorks"; "A Featurette for People Who Don't Necessarily Like 'Home Movies' by Jon Benjamin"; "The Making of the DVD Extra You Just Saw"; Music video; April 2004 radio interview with H. Jon Benjamin and Louren Bouchard
Region 1	Optional commentary on seven episodes; Animatics; Bonus game: "Decide Your Doom Game: Revenge of the Dorks"; "A Featurette for People Who Don't Necessarily Like 'Home Movies' by Jon Benjamin"; "The Making of the DVD Extra You Just Saw"; Music video; April 2004 radio interview with H. Jon Benjamin and Louren Bouchard
November 15, 2005	Optional commentary on seven episodes; Animatics; Bonus game: "Decide Your Doom Game: Revenge of the Dorks"; "A Featurette for People Who Don't Necessarily Like 'Home Movies' by Jon Benjamin"; "The Making of the DVD Extra You Just Saw"; Music video; April 2004 radio interview with H. Jon Benjamin and Louren Bouchard

== See also ==
- Home Movies
- List of Home Movies episodes
