= Felicia Michaels =

American stand-up comedian (born 1963)

- Born: November 22, 1963 (age 62); Fort Riley, Kansas, U.S.

Comedy career
- Medium: Stand-up, television, podcast, film
- Genres: Blue comedy; observational comedy
- Subjects: Relationships; human sexuality

Felicia Michaels (born November 22, 1963) is an American stand-up comedian.

== Early life ==
Michaels was born in Fort Riley, Kansas to a father in the United States Army, and a German mother. She was raised in several locations, living for two years in her mother's native Berlin, before the family settled in Fountain, Colorado. After her parents' separation, Michaels was mainly raised by her mother, who had a stroke when Michaels was fourteen years old, rendering her physically disabled. After his retirement from the military, her father became a film projectionist and operated a drive-in theater in Stockton, California.

== Career ==
Before becoming a comedian, Michaels worked as wet t-shirt contestant, a stripper, cocktail waitress, later, a comedian at aged 18. During the 1990s, she shifted her stand-up persona from a dumb-blonde stereotype to a soft-spoken provocateur with a blue sense of humor. She explores such topics as the dynamics of the male/female relationship, "dirty thoughts," and the proliferation of the sensual feminist.

She appeared in three films: Smart Alex, directed by Steve Oedekerk; Los Enchiladas! (also, line producer), directed by Mitch Hedberg; and, most recently, I Am Comic (2010), directed by Jordan Brady. She was a regular on the TV show Parental Discretion.

She posed nude for Playboy and was featured in the October 1992 issue.

Michaels auditioned as Phoebe Buffay for Friends.

She is also a photographer, and her 2008 photography project, titled "Stand Up / Stripped Down", documents comedians and the mystery of what happens backstage in the shadows that lead from the green room to the power of the stage. "Stand Up / Stripped Down" received Gold in Photojournalism/Performing Arts, 2nd Place winner in Photojournalism at the 2008 edition of The Prix de la Photographie, Paris, for photojournalism.

She is also a recipient of a CINE Golden Eagle Award for In The Weeds (2010), a short film she wrote and directed.

Michaels was the co-host of a popular weekly podcast with Joey Diaz named Beauty and Da Beast. It was nominated for Funniest Podcast by the Podcast awards in 2012.

In 2011, she released her second CD, entitled Chew On This, which continues where Lewd Awakenings left off.

== Awards ==
Michaels was nominated twice for Funniest Female Comic by the American Comedy Awards; in 1999 she won the award. She has released one album, Lewd Awakenings, on the What Are Records (HaHa Records) label. She has appeared on such networks as Showtime, MTV, VH1, NBC, as well as appearing twice on ABC's Full House. She was also a Grand Champion on Star Search, where she made her national debut.

She has also broadcast on XM Satellite Radio and Last.fm.
