= Super Crazy (disambiguation) =

Super Crazy (Francisco Islas Rueda, born 1973) is a Mexican Luchador.

Super Crazy may also refer to:

- Super Crazy (album), 2012 album by Todd Barry
- Super Crazy (film), 2018 Argentine-Uruguayan film
- Makoto Nishimoto, a Japanese politician known by the nickname "Super Crazy-kun"
