= Home Movies season 4 =

Home Movies
- Season 4
- DVD cover
- No. of episodes: 13

Release
- Original network: Adult Swim
- Original release: November 11, 2003 – April 4, 2004

Season chronology
- ← Previous; Season 3

The fourth and final season of the American animated sitcom Home Movies first aired in the United States on the Adult Swim programming block for the television network Cartoon Network from November 11, 2003 to April 4, 2004. Co-creators Brendon Small and Loren Bouchard, along with Tom Snyder, served as executive producers for the season.

The series followed the adventures of 8-year-old aspiring filmmaker, Brendon Small, who writes, directs, and stars in homemade film productions that he creates with his friends Melissa Robbins and Jason Penopolis. Brendon and Melissa's soccer coach, John McGuirk, is a selfish, short-tempered alcoholic who constantly gives the two bad advice. Brendon's divorced single mother, Paula must deal with juggling her children, her job as a creative writing teacher, and her romantic life.

== Episodes ==
No. overall	No. in season	Title	Directed by	Written by	Original release date	Prod. code
40	1	"Everyone's Entitled to My Opinion"	Loren Bouchard	Loren Bouchard, Brendon Small & Bill Braudis	November 11, 2003	401
Brendon starts writing online movie reviews for money, and his next assignment is to watch the film All that Violence, but because of its adult rating Paula forbids it. Mr. Lynch is made interim principal, which McGuirk takes full advantage of.
41	2	"Camp"	Loren Bouchard	H. Jon Benjamin, Brendon Small & Bill Braudis	January 11, 2004	409
The gang go to a performing arts camp, where they are led by Dwayne and two other counselors (voiced by John Flansburgh and John Linnell of They Might Be Giants). All three kids are berated by the camp counselors in their respective fields, and Melissa finds it difficult to overcome her fear of swimming. Meanwhile, McGuirk is taken on a camping trip, but he becomes afraid of his companions who appear to be from some sort of cult. He sneaks into the camp and the kids hide him in their cabin, until the "cult" comes looking for him. At the last day of camp, the kids put on a play expressing their extreme hate of their experience and their mentors, and Melissa finally overcomes her fear of swimming when saving McGuirk from drowning, while McGuirk comes to realize the "cult" had good intentions.
42	3	"Bye Bye Greasy"	Loren Bouchard	Loren Bouchard, H. Jon Benjamin, Brendon Small & Bill Braudis	January 18, 2004	410
Brendon directs the school musical which is set in the 1950s called "Bye Bye Greasy". Shannon forcibly casts himself as the lead, and is actually well fit for the role. Melissa is upset by Brendon's casting her as a non-singing role, and is doubly upset when Paula, who has been painting the set to be at Christmas, accidentally buys a kiwifruit pie that she must eat from in her scene, despite Melissa's hyper attentiveness to her recently discovered kiwifruit allergy. Shannon is suspended from school for his usual activities the night of the performance, forcing Brendon to understudy, while his play falls apart. Melissa accidentally eats part of the pie during the performance, causing her to run off stage in fear that she will die, but Paula reveals she went out and got another pie. Shannon returns to the school, after having discovered that Fenton, hired by Brendon to take care of lighting, sent in a false report on him to get him suspended after Shannon insulted Fenton's stage hand ability and performs the climactic number, followed by Coach McGuirk driving his car on stage in the final act to sing, despite the fact he cannot leave his car and his lines are unheard over his engine.
43	4	"The Heart Smashers"	Loren Bouchard	Loren Bouchard, H. Jon Benjamin, Brendon Small & Bill Braudis	January 25, 2004	402
Brendon attempts to break off his friendship with Fenton after realizing how overbearing he is while they are shooting a film that Fenton keeps trying to take over. Paula unsuccessfully attempts to break up with her boyfriend, despite multiple attempts. Coach McGuirk has been heavily exercising his [Pectoralis major muscle
44	5	"The Wizard's Baker"	Loren Bouchard	Loren Bouchard, H. Jon Benjamin, Brendon Small & Bill Braudis	February 8, 2004	403
Brendon is unhappy with The Wizard's Baker, the movie the gang is making, so avoids it by joining the Skunk Scouts and having fun with their model car derby. Coach McGuirk has trouble returning swords he bought from a home shopping channel after it bankrupts him. At the Skunk Scouts dinner, Melissa and Jason try to promote The Wizard's Baker, forcing Brendon to reveal his hatred of the project, but their argument is upstaged by Coach McGuirk appearing at the dinner. Ultimately, an aged attendee decides to bankroll the project, much to Brendon's surprise.
45	6	"Psycho-Delicate"	Loren Bouchard	Loren Bouchard, H. Jon Benjamin, Brendon Small & Bill Braudis	February 15, 2004	404
The gang attempts to make a movie for a video store contest, McGuirk attempts to woo a waitress at a diner (and contends with a street musician who accuses him of stealing his money and sings a scathing song about his weight), and Paula's new hairstyle backfires.
46	7	"Curses"	Loren Bouchard	Loren Bouchard, H. Jon Benjamin, Brendon Small & Bill Braudis	February 22, 2004	405
After Brendon shows a movie full of profanity and sexually suggestive content to his friends, it upsets the kids' parents, forcing Paula to get Brendon to reshoot the film without any of the cursing or lewdness, and institutes a swear jar for him. McGuirk tags along with Erik to a journal class, which is just a front for Erik to meet up with his new girlfriend in secret, a fact that Melissa has discovered. When he comes clean, Melissa decides to stay with the Smalls, but her presence keeps Brendon up, as does Jason who is staying with them as well. Brendon decides to take Erik's journal and show it to Melissa, and the father and daughter reconcile. At the screening of his cleaned film, Brendon cannot bear to watch it, so he leaves the room. Erik realizes how he has upset Melissa and Brendon gives McGuirk the swear jar, when they hear the kids react in disgust. Brendon reveals he found the movie so boring he spliced in a clip of two dogs having sex that McGuirk gave him.
47	8	"Honkey Magoo"	Loren Bouchard	Loren Bouchard, H. Jon Benjamin, Brendon Small & Bill Braudis	February 29, 2004	406
The gang adopt a stray puppy who turns out to be nothing but trouble.
48	9	"Those Bitches Tried to Cheat Me"	Loren Bouchard	Loren Bouchard, H. Jon Benjamin, Brendon Small & Bill Braudis	March 7, 2004	407
Brendon cheats on Mr. Lynch's test. Coach McGuirk attempts to cheat his way through traffic school. Jason can't get past the "stalking" phase of a relationship with a 5th grade girl.
49	10	"Cho and the Adventures of Amy Lee"	Loren Bouchard	Loren Bouchard, H. Jon Benjamin, Brendon Small & Bill Braudis	March 14, 2004	408
Brendon accidentally scores a goal, which ruins the record of the opposing team's star goalie, Cho, who threatens to harm Brendon. McGuirk remembers his days as a Scottish highland dancer.
50	11	"Definite Possible Murder"	Loren Bouchard	Loren Bouchard, H. Jon Benjamin, Brendon Small & Bill Braudis	March 21, 2004	411
In the vein of Rear Window, Brendon, laid-up in his room with a broken leg, thinks that the man who just moved in next door may be a murderer. Meanwhile, McGuirk trains to become a bartender.
51	12	"Temporary Blindness"	Loren Bouchard	Loren Bouchard, H. Jon Benjamin, Brendon Small & Bill Braudis	March 28, 2004	412
Coach McGuirk loses his vision and supposedly gains clairvoyance. The kids make family trees for a school project but Melissa's absent mother upsets her during the project.
52	13	"Focus Grill"	Loren Bouchard	Loren Bouchard, Brendon Small & Bill Braudis	April 4, 2004	413
Brendon, Jason, and Melissa discover their first film they ever made is unfinished and each decide to film an ending, presenting them to a peer focus group made up of Walter, Perry, Fenton, and Junior. Coach McGuirk attempts to build a grill in Paula's backyard for several days, but is mostly unsuccessful. After realizing that their final project is no good and their films should never be seen, McGuirk fires up the grill, causing an explosion. On the way to a fast food place after the explosion destroys the grill and leaves them with burnt clothing, Brendon films out of the car window and accidentally drops his camera onto the road, the former then being run over by another car.

== Home release ==
The DVD boxset for season four was released by Shout! Factory on May 16, 2006. Other than all thirteen episodes of the season, the DVD included several bonus features, including interviews with the cast and crew, animatics, an animation gallery, commentary tracks, and a bonus soundtrack CD.

The Complete Fourth Season
Set Details	Special Features
13 episodes; 3-disc set (plus soundtrack CD); 1.33:1 aspect ratio; English (Dolby Digital 5.1); Subtitles	24 commentaries with Cast, Crew & Special Guests including The Shins, Modest Mouse and The Staff of The Onion; Episode Animatics; A Home Movies Audio Outtakes Jukebox; "The Beginning of the Genesis of the Origin of Home Movies": The Very First Sessions with Loren Bouchard; A Bonus Soundtrack CD; Taken from: https://web.archive.org/web/20121020063907/http://www.tvshowsondvd.com/news/Home-Movies/5313#ixzz1Ton5EQ6L
Release Dates	24 commentaries with Cast, Crew & Special Guests including The Shins, Modest Mouse and The Staff of The Onion; Episode Animatics; A Home Movies Audio Outtakes Jukebox; "The Beginning of the Genesis of the Origin of Home Movies": The Very First Sessions with Loren Bouchard; A Bonus Soundtrack CD; Taken from: https://web.archive.org/web/20121020063907/http://www.tvshowsondvd.com/news/Home-Movies/5313#ixzz1Ton5EQ6L
Region 1	24 commentaries with Cast, Crew & Special Guests including The Shins, Modest Mouse and The Staff of The Onion; Episode Animatics; A Home Movies Audio Outtakes Jukebox; "The Beginning of the Genesis of the Origin of Home Movies": The Very First Sessions with Loren Bouchard; A Bonus Soundtrack CD; Taken from: https://web.archive.org/web/20121020063907/http://www.tvshowsondvd.com/news/Home-Movies/5313#ixzz1Ton5EQ6L
May 16, 2006	24 commentaries with Cast, Crew & Special Guests including The Shins, Modest Mouse and The Staff of The Onion; Episode Animatics; A Home Movies Audio Outtakes Jukebox; "The Beginning of the Genesis of the Origin of Home Movies": The Very First Sessions with Loren Bouchard; A Bonus Soundtrack CD; Taken from: https://web.archive.org/web/20121020063907/http://www.tvshowsondvd.com/news/Home-Movies/5313#ixzz1Ton5EQ6L

== Home Movies: Bonus CD ==
Home Movies: Bonus CD

Soundtrack album by Brendon Small
- Released: May 16, 2006
- Recorded: 1999–2004
- Genres: Comedy rock, acoustic, alternative rock, hard rock, parody
- Length: 70:32
- Label: Shout! Factory
- Producer: Brendon Small

Brendon Small chronology
Home Movies: Bonus CD (2006)	Brendon Small's Galaktikon (2012)

Home Movies: Bonus CD is a soundtrack album to the show Home Movies. It was released May 16, 2006, and includes fifty-two songs which were featured throughout the series. The CD comes packaged with the DVD release of the show's fourth season box set. All music was written by Brendon Small.

=== Track listing ===
All vocals by Brendon Small, except where noted.

All music is composed by Brendon Small, except where noted.

No.	Title	Length
1.	"Season One Opening & Closing Theme"	0:45
2.	"Franz Kafka! Intro"	1:19
3.	"Turnin' To A Bug"	0:21
4.	"Livin' Like A Bug Ain't Easy"	0:49
5.	"Franz Kafka! Finale"	0:16
6.	"Louis Louis Rap"	0:37
7.	"Don't Put Marbles in Your Nose"	1:12
8.	"Don't Kill Children"	0:41
9.	"Season One Act 2 Theme"	0:22
10.	"Season Two Opening Theme"	0:21
11.	"Crazy Legs"	0:51
12.	"Crazy Legs Ballad"	0:34
13.	"Jason's Theme"	1:22
14.	"Jazz Fight" (vocals – Jon Benjamin)	0:48
15.	"The Birthday Song"	1:21
16.	"Sunset Theme"	1:59
17.	"Alone"	1:01
18.	"President King's Theme"	1:29
19.	"Starboy & The Captain Of Outer Space"	0:49
20.	"The Compliments Song" (vocals – Jon Benjamin)	1:18
21.	"Hot Dog Music"	1:31
22.	"Victory"	1:33
23.	"Mr. Pants"	1:17
24.	"Bad Coffee"	0:58
25.	"Duanetastic"	3:11
26.	"Duane Outro"	1:34
27.	"Landstander Theme"	1:17
28.	"El Escapo"	1:43
29.	"No Skin Off My Ass" (vocals – Laura Silverman)	1:19
30.	"The Ballad Of King Arthur & Robin Hood"	3:37
31.	"Duane's Practice"	0:28
32.	"Jimmy's Big Solo"	0:56
33.	"Duane's Big Solo"	0:43
34.	"Trust Yourself"	1:47
35.	"We Are Artists" (vocals – Jon Benjamin, Melissa Galsky)	0:39
36.	"Coffins & Cradles Theme"	0:53
37.	"Welcome 2 Hell"	2:12
38.	"Bye Bye Greasy (Medley)" (vocals – Emo Philips, Jon Benjamin, Melissa Galsky)	6:01
39.	"I'll Race (Reprise)" (vocals – Jon Benjamin)	0:33
40.	"Septopus Theme"	1:41
41.	"Heart Smashers Theme"	1:31
42.	"The Wizard's Baker Rock Opera" (vocals – Jon Benjamin, Melissa Galsky)	1:37
43.	"I'm A Kid Again"	1:28
44.	"Psycho-Delicate (Medley)" (vocals – Janine Ditullio, Jon Benjamin, Melissa Galsky, Todd Barry)	4:16
45.	"Dog Training Montage"	1:48
46.	"Brendon Steals The Test"	0:40
47.	"Brendon Cheats"	0:51
48.	"Bagpipes"	0:52
49.	"Ping Pong & Too Koo"	1:01
50.	"Timmy! (Medley)"	2:37
51.	"Brendon's Camera"	1:10
52.	"Season Two Closing Theme"	0:33
Total length:		70:32

=== Personnel ===
- Brendon Small – vocals, guitar, piano, drum machine, production

Home Movies cast

- Jon Benjamin – vocals
- Janine Ditullio – vocals
- Melissa Galsky – vocals
- Emo Philips – vocals
- Todd Barry – vocals
- Laura Silverman – vocals

== See also ==
- Home Movies
- List of Home Movies episodes
- "Focus Grill"
