= Mitch All Together =

Live album by Mitch Hedberg
- Released: December 9, 2003
- Recorded: May 2003 at the Acme Comedy Club, Minneapolis
- Genre: Stand-up comedy
- Length: 39:00
- Label: Comedy Central
- Producer: Jack Vaughn

Mitch Hedberg chronology
Strategic Grill Locations (1999)	Mitch All Together (2003)	Do You Believe in Gosh? (2008)

Professional ratings
Review scores
Source	Rating
Allmusic	link

Mitch All Together is the second comedy album by Mitch Hedberg, and the final released in his lifetime. It is a recording of a performance at the Acme Comedy Club in Minneapolis, Minnesota, from May 2003. The CD was packaged with a DVD of Hedberg's 1999 Comedy Central special in two versions, the first being the one edited down to a half-hour and shown on Comedy Central, and the second being the raw unedited taping which is about 15 minutes longer. The DVD also features his appearance on a 1998 episode of Comedy Central's Premium Blend. The CD is packaged in a double-fold digipack.

As with his previous album, the title Mitch All Together is a reference to a joke which is not included on the album (the joke is on track seven of the 1999 self-released edition of his previous album Strategic Grill Locations):

You know how they call corn on the cob "corn on the cob", right? But that's how it comes out of the ground, man. They should call that "corn". They should call every other version "corn off the cob". It's not like if you cut off my arm, you would call my arm "Mitch"; but then reattach it and call it "Mitch all together".

== Track listing ==
1. "This CD Is In Stores" – 3:40
2. "Sandwiches" – 2:18
3. "Not Track Five, Not Chainsaw Juggler" – 1:06
4. "Teeth" – 1:53
5. "Candy Bars" – 2:04
6. "Houses" – 2:20
7. "Pop" – 2:35
8. "The Pipe" – 2:04
9. "Business Cards" – 2:23
10. "Sesame Seeds" – 1:34
11. "Three Easy Payments" – 2:05
12. "Arrows" – 2:25
13. "Saved by the Buoyancy of Citrus" – 2:16
14. "Mitch in the S'th" – 2:39
15. "Bed and Breakfast" – 4:18
16. "X" – 1:37
17. "Movie Pot" – 1:43

== Charts ==
Chart (2004–05)	Peak position
US Heatseekers Albums (Billboard)	28
US Independent Albums (Billboard)	22
US Top Comedy Albums (Billboard)	2

== Certifications ==
Region	Certification	Certified units/sales
United States (RIAA)	Gold	500,000^{‡}
^{‡} Sales+streaming figures based on certification alone.
