= The Chant =

American indie rock band

The Chant is an indie rock band from South Florida that relocated to Atlanta. The band formed in 1984 and was originally composed of Walter Cz on vocals, guitars and mandolin, James "Bing" Johnson on vocals and bass, Todd Barry on drums, and Rich DeFinis on guitar. Notable later lineups included Frank Mullen on drums, Earl "Bubba" Maddox on drums, "Mighty" Joe Hamm on drums, Gregory Dean Smalley on guitar, and Pat Johnson on guitar.

== Releases ==
- Three Sheets to the Wind – 1985. Safety Net Records
- Two Car Mirage – 1989 – Produced by The Chant, John Keane and James Klotz. Bill Ashton served as executive producer. Recorded in Atlanta's Channel One Studios. Released by Safety Net Records and bears the cutter NET 12. It is also available in CD format and that CD also includes their debut album, 1985's Three Sheets to the Wind sans one track.
- We Three Kings – Christmas Single – 1990 (b/w Charlie Pickett's Bullshit)
