= Do You Believe in Gosh? =

Do You Believe In Gosh?

Live album by Mitch Hedberg
- Released: September 9, 2008
- Recorded: January 2005
- Genre: Stand-up comedy
- Length: 39:38
- Label: Comedy Central Records
- Producer: Jack Vaughn

Mitch Hedberg chronology
Mitch All Together (2003)	Do You Believe In Gosh? (2008)

Professional ratings
Review scores
Source	Rating
AllMusic	3/5 stars
The A.V. Club	B−
Prefix	7.5/10 stars

Do You Believe in Gosh? is the third live album from stand-up comedian Mitch Hedberg. It was released September 9, 2008. The album is a posthumous release, having been recorded two months before his death on March 23, 2005. The album was recorded in Ontario, California.

== Track listing ==
1. "The Improv Fairy Tale" – 3:40
2. "Door Deal" – 2:28
3. "Hot Air Balloon" – 2:57
4. "Headless Horseman" – 2:57
5. "Hotels and Beds" – 3:57
6. "Phil" – 3:23
7. "Restaurants" – 2:22
8. "Texas and Sea Food" – 2:54
9. "Tea Ski" – 3:23
10. "Canal Smarts" – 2:18
11. "The Vacuumist" – 2:34
12. "Belt" – 3:30
13. "Soda Pop" – 3:17

== Personnel ==
- Mitch Hedberg – Performer
- Steve Rossiter – Engineer
- Lynn Shawcroft – Liner Notes, Executive Producer, Photography, Illustrations
- Ian Stearns – Associate Producer
- Jack Vaughn – Producer
