= Strategic Grill Locations =

Live album by Mitch Hedberg
- Released: September 7, 1999
- Recorded: 1999
- Venues: The Laff Stop, Houston
- Genre: Stand-up comedy
- Length: 53:47
- Label: Comedy Central
- Producer: Jack Vaughn

Mitch Hedberg chronology
Strategic Grill Locations (1999)	Mitch All Together (2003)

Professional ratings
Review scores
Source	Rating
Allmusic	4.5/5 stars

Strategic Grill Locations is a comedy album from Mitch Hedberg. It is a recording of a performance at The Laff Stop comedy club in Houston, Texas, on September 7, 1999. The album was originally self-published by Hedberg and sold through his website and at shows. In conjunction with the release of his second album, Mitch All Together, the Comedy Central label also re-released this album, editing out some jokes that did not get much reaction. This re-release was packaged in a digipack. The original release featured a different cover.

Like Mitch All Together, the title Strategic Grill Locations is taken from a joke that does not actually appear on the album:

See I'm a dreamer, man, and when I was a cook I'd always work with people who weren't dreamers. Like, I was cooking at this restaurant and I put a hot dog on the grill and my kitchen manager came over, and he said, "Mitch, put the hot dog up here, in the right-hand corner of the grill, so in case you get a whole bunch of orders at once you have all this space available." See that's how I knew he wasn't a dreamer, 'cause the day I give up my dreams is the day I have strategic grill locations. A dreamer has a philosophy: The entire grill is hot.

Strategic Grill Locations contains 21 tracks of mostly one-liners. Tracks contain a series of both related and unrelated jokes, and are named for one of them. Hedberg's performance is accompanied by Chuck Savage on double bass.

== Reception ==
Spin Magazine ranked the album as one of the 40 Greatest Comedy Albums of All Time, as did The A.V. Club. During a Hot Ones interview, comedian John Mulaney listed the album as one of his four favorite stand-up albums, calling him a "totally singular voice".

== Track listing ==
1. "The CD Jokes" – 2:36
2. "Koalas" – 3:08
3. "Highlights" – 2:08
4. "You Were Good" – 2:00
5. "Shaving Too" – 2:12
6. "Minibar" – 2:58
7. "Beret and Pancakes" – 1:49
8. "The Velcro Wallet" – 2:41
9. "Dry Clean Only" – 1:27
10. "Gambling" – 2:25
11. "My Necklace" – 2:45
12. "Acting" – 2:59
13. "Lynn" – 2:45
14. "Tomatoes" – 2:39
15. "Six People Isn't Convincing" – 2:55
16. "Cookies" – 3:13
17. "Oatmeal" – 2:44
18. "Smackie the Frog" – 2:50
19. "Frogs and Bears" – 3:00
20. "Fire Exit" – 3:12
21. "The Dufrenes" – 1:21
