= A Good Opportunity =

- Flight of the Conchords episode
- Episode no.: Season 2 Episode 1
- Directed by: James Bobin
- Written by: James Bobin; Jemaine Clement; Bret McKenzie
- Production code: 201
- Original air date: January 18, 2009

Guest appearances
- Greg Proops (Martin Clark); Andrea Rosen (Caitlin Goodman); David Costabile (Doug); Clayton Dean Smith (Promoter); Joanna Bobin

Episode chronology
← Previous "The Third Conchord"	Next → "The New Cup"

"A Good Opportunity" is the first episode of the second season of the HBO comedy series Flight of the Conchords. This episode first aired in the United States and Canada on January 18, 2009. It was released online to US residents at Funny or Die on December 17, 2008.

== Plot synopsis ==
Bret and Jemaine are at Murray's fancy new office discussing band matters. Murray tells the guys to return the seat cushion they stole from the library and mistakenly refers to Crazy Dogggz business, such as their gold records and collaboration with R. Kelly. The meeting ends as Bret and Jemaine fire Murray for failing to attend to his management duties. Murray sings "Rejected."

At a gig with a larger than usual crowd, two advertising agency executives offer Bret and Jemaine the opportunity to write a jingle for a commercial for a brand of toothpaste to be marketed solely to women. They agree, and work on ideas, asking Dave for his advice on what women like and how to negotiate with the advertising executives.

Murray, meanwhile, finds himself unhappy that Bret and Jemaine are finding more success without him, and discovers the Crazy Dogggz have plagiarized "Doggy Bounce" from a Polish band, to the point where there are protests and public burnings in the street (led by Mel). A lawsuit results in a now-penniless Murray having to live in his car.

The guys bungle Dave's negotiating strategy, but end up appearing in the commercial. When the executives ask for Bret and Jemaine's work permits to process their fees, Bret and Jemaine find themselves in a quandary, because they are illegal immigrants. They call Murray to ask him for their passports, which Murray says are in the consulate. Murray is reluctant to return to the place because he resigned with an incendiary letter, but he braces himself and finds that no one had noticed his quitting several months before and the letter is still on his desk, unread. He embraces his old desk in relief.

Back at the commercial set, Murray arrives to help Bret and Jemaine, but only after they agree to rehire him as band manager. He tells the guys that their passports have not been processed, and suggests they make a run for it. Diving into Murray's car, they drive off as Murray comments that someone above must be looking out for them and the episode closes with "Angels".

== Songs ==
The following songs were featured in this episode:

=== "Rejected" ===
Murray sings "Rejected" after Bret and Jemaine fire him as their manager. He describes his feelings at first in a delicate and poignant manner, but soon the song turns to an operatic style with Murray singing as a tenor (voice of Andrew Drost). He describes his feelings with increasing drama, such as "dejected, like a clown without a show" and "cut into two, or bisected". The song is briefly interrupted by Glenn (Andrew Secunda), who is told by Murray to wait a moment, before finishing the song, singing the final lyric in the manner in which the song began.

=== "Femident Toothpaste" ===
This is the boys' jingle for the Femident toothpaste commercial. In the ad, Bret and Jemaine are dressed as toothpaste being squeezed out of Femident toothpaste tubes. The song also incorporated some of the lyrics from "Nearly a Woman" from the "Pop Song" episode of the Flight of the Conchords radio series.

=== "Angels" ===
The episode ends with this song, after Murray announces he believes angels must be looking over them. The song is dedicated to the proposition that angels exist, live in the clouds above the earth, and primarily concern themselves with sex.
