= Los Enchiladas! =

1999 film by Mitch Hedberg

- Directed by: Mitch Hedberg
- Written by: Mitch Hedberg
- Produced by: Mitch Hedberg; Jana Johnson; Brian Malow
- Starring: Mitch Hedberg; Dave Attell; Jana Johnson; Brian Malow; Marc Maron; Todd Barry; Chard Hogan; Felicia Michaels; Dave Mordal
- Cinematography: Chris Haifley; Matt Ehling
- Edited by: Jumbulingam Chandrasekhar
- Release date: January 1999
- Running time: 75 min.
- Country: United States

Los Enchiladas! is a 1999 film written, directed by and starring stand-up comedian Mitch Hedberg. The film was shot and set in Minnesota.

== Content ==
The film is loosely based on Hedberg's life growing up in Minnesota and his experience working in restaurants. It parodies a chain Mexican restaurant in a suburb of St. Paul, Minnesota, on the day before Cinco de Mayo, the busiest day of the year for Mexican restaurants. The storyline follows an ensemble cast of absurd characters that work in and visit the restaurant throughout the course of one day.

== Cast and locations ==
The cast is composed of many of Hedberg's comedian friends and rounded out by local Minnesota actors.

Three different local restaurants were used to portray the film's restaurant: Boca Chica for the dining room scenes, Gabe's By The Park for the kitchen scenes, and Chi-Chi's at Maplewood Mall for the outside of the restaurant, the last of which Hedberg actually worked at many years before and was the main inspiration for the ridiculously inauthentic Los Enchiladas.

== Availability ==
Los Enchiladas! premiered at the 1999 Sundance Film Festival, and has only been shown publicly a handful of times since, at comedy festivals and tributes to the deceased director, such as the one at the Paramount Theatre in Anderson, Indiana, on August 12, 2010. It has never been publicly released for purchase or download.

In April 2011, an unofficial workprint copy was released on various torrent and peer-to-peer sites. This release was opposed by Hedberg's widow, Lynn Shawcroft, who is working towards a wider release of the film.
