= The Third Conchord =

- Flight of the Conchords episode
- Episode no.: Season 1 Episode 12
- Directed by: James Bobin
- Written by: James Bobin; Jemaine Clement; Bret McKenzie
- Production code: 112
- Original air date: September 2, 2007

Guest appearances
- Todd Barry (Todd); Demetri Martin (Demetri); Eugene Mirman (Eugene); Frank Wood (Greg)

Episode chronology
← Previous "The Actor"	Next → "A Good Opportunity"

"The Third Conchord" is the twelfth and final episode of the first season of the HBO comedy series Flight of the Conchords. This episode first aired in the United States on Sunday, September 2, 2007.

== Plot synopsis ==
At a band meeting, Bret and Jemaine discover that Murray has hired a bongo player, Todd (Todd Barry) without consulting them. They demand Murray fire him, but Murray convinces them to give Todd a chance.

Their dismay soon turns to disdain as, despite his average talents, the obnoxious Todd thinks of himself as a rock star. He has no interest in the band beyond its use as a conduit to fame and women, refusing to play Bret and Jemaine's songs and forcing them to try his own, performing protracted bongo solos, and dismissing the band's name as 'boring.'

Outside the rehearsal room he's little better, flirting with Mel, ignoring the fact that she's married and questioning Bret and Jemaine's sexuality for not sleeping with her themselves.

After their first gig together — at which Todd has typically launched into a long bongo solo — they try to convince Murray that Todd has to go because he is not "cool". But Murray refuses because Todd is popular and is bringing the band more fans. Despite this, the next day Jemaine attempts to fire him, but Todd's powers of persuasion are too much for him ('he did a sad face at me') and he ends up taking the easy option and firing Bret instead. Bret then does his angry dance.

After unsuccessfully attempting to weasel his way back into the band, Bret gives up and forms a new band of his own "The Original Flight of the Conchords" with a keytar player he has met named Demitri (Demetri Martin). Despite Murray's reluctance to manage both bands, they are surprised to discover that the two new incarnations of The Conchords are more successful than Bret and Jemaine ever were. Bret and Jemaine are still not pleased, however, since neither of them are getting along that well with their respective band-mates.

After a very successful gig in which "Flight of the Conchords" is the opening act for "The Original Flight of the Conchords", a pleased Murray suggests that the two bands merge to form a supergroup. Instead Todd and Demetri announce that they want to split from Bret and Jemaine and team up together to form the "Crazy Dogggz".

One month later, the song Todd had tried to get the Conchords to play, "Doggy Bounce", is number one in 24 countries. The Crazy Dogggz are touring the world and a busy and now-rich Murray is neglecting the Conchords. Even worse, their once-devoted fan Mel has also switched allegiance to the other band. The episode ends with Bret and Jemaine doing the angry dance.

== Songs ==
The following songs were featured in this episode:

=== "Bret's Angry Dance" ===
This song is an instrumental, and is played when Bret starts dancing to vent his anger on being fired from the band. The dance closely follows the style of Kevin Bacon's angry dance in Footloose. The song is reprised over the closing credits, with Bret and Jemaine dancing.

=== "Doggy Bounce" ===
Only one new song appears in this episode and it is not, at least in a plot sense, a Conchords song. The Crazy Dogggz song "Doggy Bounce", sung by Todd and Demetri, features somewhat childish lyrics set to a simple melody. The music video for it, which Bret and Jemaine watch on television, features Todd and Demitri in suits accompanied by four female dancers wearing doggy ears. It resembles very closely the "Macarena" music video by Los del Rio from 1996. Murray's English bulldog, Toby, also makes an appearance.

In the next episode, the first episode of season two, we learn that Todd plagiarized this song from a Polish band.

=== Other songs ===
During the scenes in which the various incarnations of the band are performing, we see snippets of "Robots".

== Cultural references ==
Early in the episode Bret mentions to Jemaine that he sometimes dances "when he is angry". Later in the episode we see Bret launch into an elaborate dance sequence mimicking the Kevin Bacon dance from the 1984 film Footloose. During the end credits both Bret and Jemaine begin the same dance.

In one scene, Jemaine and Todd arrive at Murray's office wearing leather jackets. Murray remarks that "the Fonzies have arrived" referring to the character Fonzie played by Henry Winkler from the 1970s TV series Happy Days.

The title is a reference to the concept of a Fifth Beatle.

After a gig, Murray makes a reference to the Pied Piper, relating his "coolness" to that of Todd's.

The band name Crazy Dogggz refers to the band Wylde Ratttz from the 1998 film Velvet Goldmine. In the show Todd specifically says he wants it to be spelled with three g's and a z.
