= The Actor (Flight of the Conchords) =

- Flight of the Conchords episode
- Episode no.: Season 1 Episode 11
- Directed by: Michael Patrick Jann
- Written by: Damon Beesley; Iain Morris
- Production code: 111
- Original air date: August 26, 2007

Guest appearances
- Will Forte (Ben); John Turturro (Credits cop); Dan Bakkedahl (Waiter); David Costabile (Doug); Eugene Mirman (Eugene); Frank Wood (Greg)

Episode chronology
← Previous "New Fans"	Next → "The Third Conchord"

"The Actor" is the eleventh episode of the HBO comedy series Flight of the Conchords. This episode first aired in the United States on Sunday, August 26, 2007.

== Plot synopsis ==
The boys play a gig in a club to just a handful of people. After the gig when Bret and Jemaine are at the bar, a "semi-professional" actor named Ben introduces himself. At first, he thinks they are a comedy act and that Bret and Jemaine are just playing characters from what he considers an "obscure, backwards country that no one knows anything about". But once Bret and Jemaine admit they are actually from New Zealand, he feels guilty and offers them his card expressing a wish to work with them in the future. At a post-show debriefing Murray gets depressed about the lack of success he has had promoting the band to record companies.

Bret and Jemaine visit Ben at the dry cleaners where he works. They ask him to call Murray posing as a record company executive and let him down gently. Ben calls Murray posing as "Stefan Gucci" from Sony, but after Murray starts begging and crying, he breaks down and agrees to give the band a record deal.

Murray and the boys go to dinner with "Stefan Gucci". Despite Jemaine's attempts to get them out of the mess, Murray and Bret agree to the two-million dollar deal that Ben offers them.

Following the filming of a The Lord of the Rings-themed music video, the boys try to tell Murray about the mistake, but his excited mood causes them to postpone the bad news. They finally get around to telling him the following night after Murray throws them an expensive wrap party. A fuming Murray storms off.

Bret and Jemaine visit Ben again to discuss the mess. He gives them an I.O.U. for the money Murray has spent. He tells them he will be able to pay them back soon because he has got a part in a Martin Scorsese movie about a dry cleaner, but they don't believe him. They visit Murray at his office and make up with him. They even manage to cheer him up a little.

During the credits, we see Ben playing a scene with John Turturro in the aforementioned film, titled Dry Cleaner.

== Notes ==
- In the opening nightclub scene, Bret is wearing a T-shirt made from the picture of Sally he embroidered for her in the "Sally Returns" episode.
- The basic plot of this episode was previously used in the first episode of the Flight of the Conchords radio series.

== Songs ==
The following songs were featured in this episode:

=== "Cheer Up, Murray" ===
Bret and Jemaine sing "Cheer Up, Murray" to Murray after the disappointing concert. They attempt to cheer him up by describing all the good things in his life, although they can't help slipping in some not-so-good things as well. The scene takes place in the store room of the night club. During the song we see a number of short sequences featuring aspects of Murray's life depicted through animated pictures in a photo album.

=== "Frodo (Don't Wear the Ring)" ===
In a park, the guys film a music video parodying The Lord of the Rings. The lyrics summarise the story from the first film and the end of the third film. Greg acts as cameraman whilst Bret plays both Frodo and Legolas, Jemaine plays Sam and Gimli, Murray plays Gandalf, Mel plays Arwen, Eugene plays Saruman and Dave plays Aragorn. "Frodo" (a.k.a. "Frodo, Don't Wear the Ring") is sung in a mix of styles including folk, heavy metal and rap.

== Cultural references ==
This episode features a prominent reference to The Lord of the Rings movies, which were all filmed in New Zealand and featured Bret in a small role. Several other episodes have contained references to The Lord of the Rings as well, usually in the context that it is one of the few things for which New Zealand is famous. “Frodo, Don’t Wear the Ring” plays off of Simon & Garfunkel imagery and calls back to Led Zeppelin’s LOTR-inspired riffs.

== Filming locations ==
- Fontana's Bar, 105 Eldridge St, New York City
- Top Hat Tailors & Cleaners, 592 Lorimer Street, Brooklyn, New York
- The scene in which Bret and Jemaine seek advice from Dave was filmed on the corner of Grand St and Eldridge St in Manhattan, New York.
