= Focus Grill =

- Home Movies episode
- Melissa, Brendon, and Jason re-watch clips from the majority of their movies.
- Episode no.: Season 4 Episode 13
- Directed by: Loren Bouchard
- Written by: Brendon Small
- Original air date: April 4, 2004

Guest appearance
- Sam Seder as Fenton

Episode chronology
← Previous "Temporary Blindness"	Next → —
- Home Movies (season 4)

"Focus Grill" is the thirteenth and final episode of the fourth season of the American animated sitcom Home Movies, the 52nd episode of the series overall and the series finale. It originally aired in the United States on Adult Swim on April 4, 2004. In the episode, Brendon, Melissa, and Jason decide to finally film an ending to the first movie they did together.

"Focus Grill" was written by Brendon Small and directed by Loren Bouchard. Despite struggling with the knowledge of the show's cancellation since the start of the fourth season production run, Small noted that this final episode was actually an optimistic note for the series. The episode concludes with Brendon's camera breaking, which Small believed was a way to finally eliminate the hindrances of the character's metaphorical crutch.

The final episode received a largely positive response, with reviewers praising it for its sentimental, bittersweet way of concluding the show.

== Plot ==
Coach McGuirk volunteers to assemble Paula's large and complicated new grill, but he proves to be both incredibly inexperienced and largely incompetent at performing such a task.

Meanwhile, Brendon, Melissa, and Jason decide to screen their latest movie in front of a focus group that consists of their schoolmates Fenton, Junior, Perry, and Walter. The focus group members harshly criticize it, and in the midst of trying to find the movie's flaw, the three friends discover that the first movie they ever made together — in which they are a biker gang contemplating whether or not to fight an unknown adversary — is missing an ending. The three cannot agree on a conclusion for the movie, so they decide that each of them will film their own, and then screen the three potential endings in front of the focus group. None of the three endings are well received.

After the focus group leaves, Brendon, Melissa, and Jason watch a reel composed of scenes from several of their film projects; they come to the consensus their movies aren't fit for an audience, and that they've been filming them out of pure habit.

When McGuirk believes that he has finally completed the grill, he gathers Paula and the three kids together to witness its first ignition, but he ultimately causes a large explosion. The five go off on a drive, covered in soot. Brendon, filming the road out the window, accidentally drops his camera on the road, where it is run over by a car. He groans "oh no," and almost begins to tell the others about what has just happened, but ends up getting drawn into a conversation about where to go for dinner.

The episode and series concludes with Paula, McGuirk, Jason, Melissa, and Brendon chattering about tapas, as Brendon's broken camera briefly shoots an empty road before the picture flickers and turns to static.

== Production ==
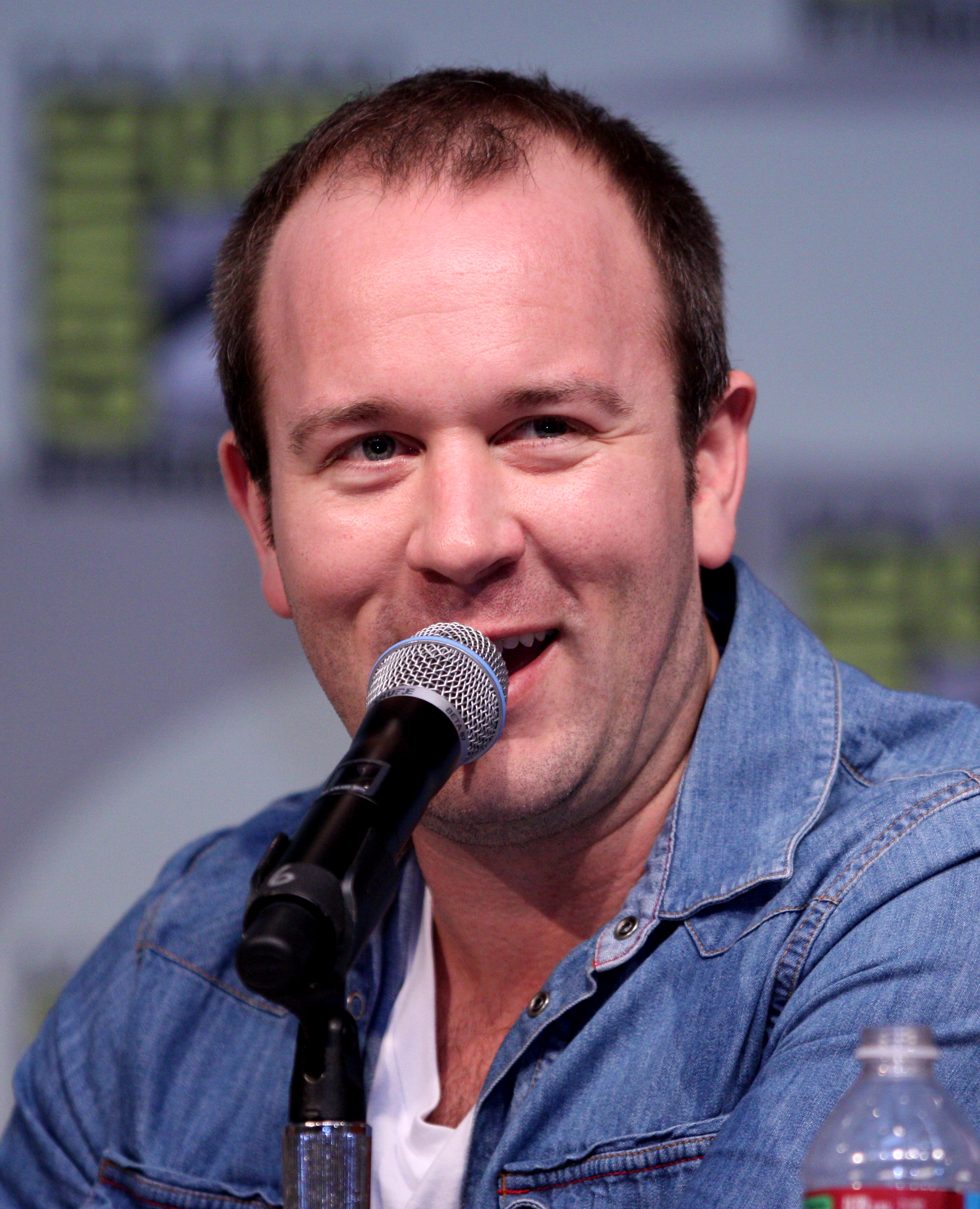
Series co-creator Brendon Small wrote the finale "Focus Grill".

The episode was written by Home Movies co-creator Brendon Small, and was the final episode of the series' production run. The episode was the fifty-second of the series, a number that allows for an even distribution of reruns of the series; Small noted that the technique is normally used on animated children's shows, though Home Movies is actually created for an adult audience.

Small knew before writing the episode that it would be the last. Mike Lazzo, executive vice president of Adult Swim, had never "responded to the show" as Small had noted, which was in stark contrast to Vice President of Original Series Khaki Jones, whose enthusiasm over the series was what Small admitted to keeping it alive. During the production run for the fourth season, Lazzo had informed the crew bluntly that the season would conclude the series, explaining, "No matter what the numbers are, no matter what happens – we're not going to bring the show back."

Having been informed of this definite end of the series' run, Small decided to write "Focus Grill" with the intention of it concluding the show. While penning the teleplay, he kept in mind the knowledge that "nothing positive [is] happening"; however, Small did admit that the final scene of the episode—Brendon's camera breaking on the road—was meant as an optimistic footnote in the series' narrative. Small explains that Brendon was using filmmaking and the camera as a crutch, and "he doesn't need this crutch anymore...he can actually start living his life as an actual earthling."

"Focus Grill", like all episodes, was directed by co-creator Loren Bouchard, and as with every episode of Home Movies after its first season, the episode was animated using Macromedia Flash. The Squigglevision animation program is briefly used in one scene in the episode, where Brendon, Melissa, and Jason watch various movies of theirs from throughout the series, some of which are from the first season, in which the show utilized Squigglevision.

== Broadcast and reception ==
"Focus Grill" originally aired on Adult Swim, a cable network that shares channel space with Cartoon Network, on April 4, 2004. After the episode aired, Small received several e-mails from various fans, who told him that watching the episode's ending had made them cry. The episode received a largely positive response from reviewers. C.S.Strowbridge of The Numbers wrote that it was "able to really wrap up the series in a great way and show why the characters acted the way they did", and praised it for "[showing] some real character development." Pop Matters' Jesse Hassenger described it as both "bittersweet" and "hilarious".

Writing for his DVD Talk review of the show's tenth anniversary DVD boxset, Jason Bailey considered the episode "especially strong, drawing the series to a fine full circle, both structurally and thematically." Bailey concurred with Hassenger's description of it as bittersweet, writing: "It's an affectionate send-off, bittersweet and kind of wonderful and therefore perfectly in tone with this charming little show." Nate Meyers of Digitally Obsessed described it as the epitome of the show's various themes, including childhood, art, and family, calling it "a slightly nostalgic episode"; he considered it an excellent way to close the series, writing "Acting as probably both a reflection of the show's staff at the time and a final send off, I can't think of a better way to send Brendon Small and Loren Bouchard's creation into the sunset."
