= Super Crazy (album) =

Todd Barry

Live album by Todd Barry
- Released: July 24, 2012
- Label: Comedy Central Rec.

Todd Barry chronology
From Heaven (2008)	Todd Barry (2012)

Super Crazy is the fourth album by American stand-up comedian, Todd Barry. It was released on July 24, 2012 by Comedy Central Records. A live DVD of the same name was also released on July 24, 2012. The album and special received positive reviews.
