= Todd Barry =

American actor and stand-up comedian

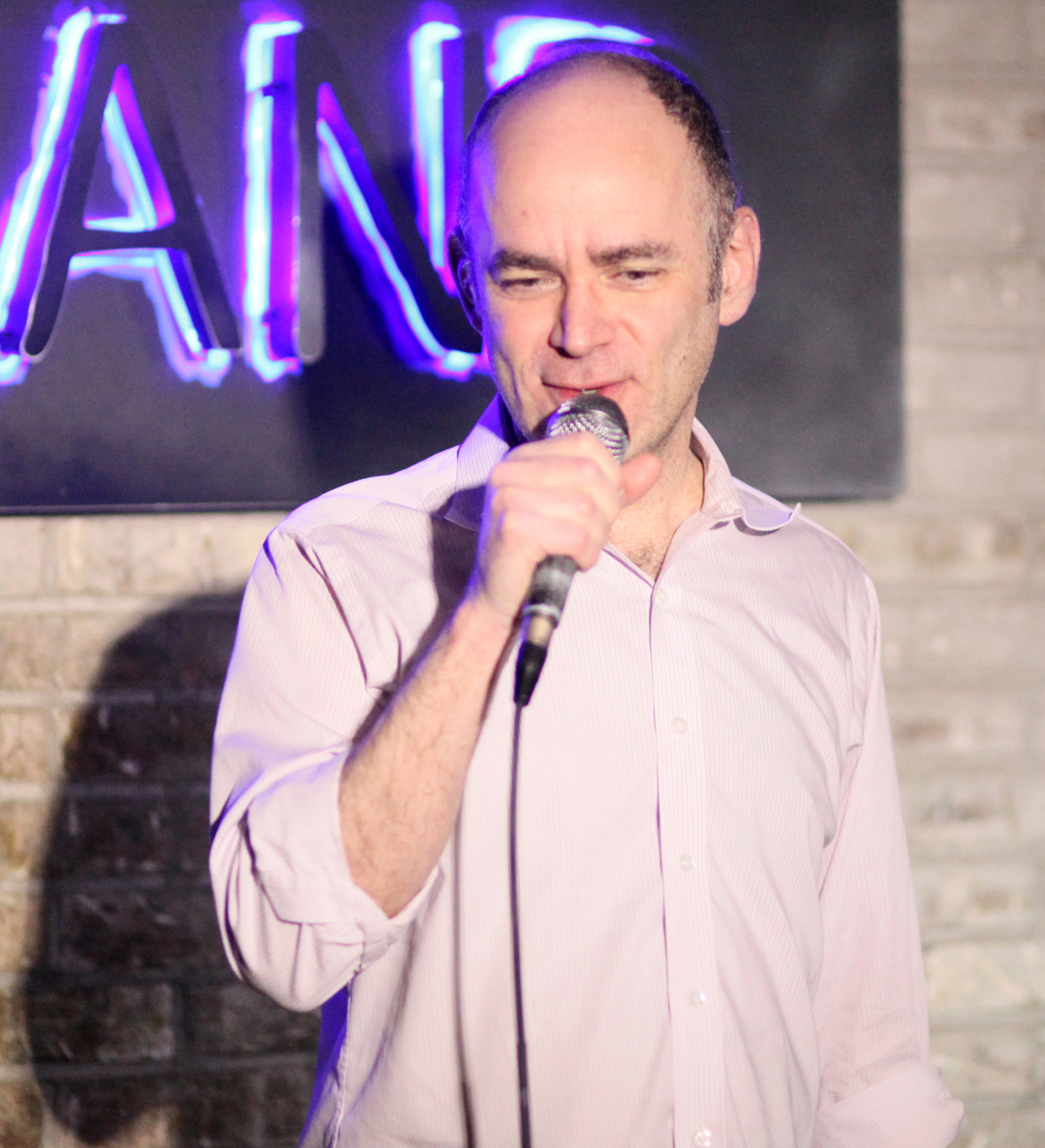
- Barry in 2025
- Born: March 26, 1964 (age 62); The Bronx, New York, U.S.
- Occupations: Comedian; actor
- Years active: 1987–present
- Website: Official website

Todd Barry (born March 26, 1964) is an American stand-up comedian and actor best known for his "bone-dry" and extremely sarcastic deadpan delivery. He grew up in Florida but lives in New York city where he was born. During the mid 1980s, Barry played drums with the indie rock band The Chant. His first Comedy Central special "Super Crazy" was aired in 2012 and since then he has released several other comedy albums, including his 2016 critically acclaimed and fan favorite "The Crowd Work Tour".

Barry has appeared in numerous films and television roles, most notably in The Larry Sanders Show (as the staff writer Keith), Flight of the Conchords (as the "Third Conchord"), and Louie (as himself).

== Life and career ==
Barry was born in The Bronx, New York, and grew up in Florida. He graduated from the University of Florida with a degree in English in 1986. Before starting in stand-up comedy, he was a drummer in the indie rock band The Chant from 1984 to 1985. In 1999, his Comedy Central Presents aired. He wrote, directed and starred in the short film Borrowing Saffron (2002), co-starring H. Jon Benjamin and Caitlin Miller. He has made guest appearances on shows like Dr. Katz, Professional Therapist, Home Movies, Space Ghost Coast to Coast, Wonder Showzen, Tom Goes to the Mayor, and Aqua Teen Hunger Force. He also voices a recurring character on Squidbillies. In 2004, he was featured in the animated series Shorties Watchin' Shorties. Barry has made guest appearances on classic comedies including Sex and the City, The Larry Sanders Show, Master of None, Inside Amy Schumer and Chappelle's Show. Barry has also voiced multiple roles on the popular FOX animated series, Bob's Burgers.

He made 16 appearances on Dr. Katz—in the first two, as himself; then as the recurring character of Todd, a video store clerk, in most of its final season episodes. He also played a character in the television pilot Saddle Rash along with Sarah Silverman, H. Jon Benjamin and Mitch Hedberg. In "The Third Conchord", the twelfth and final episode of the first season of Flight of the Conchords, Barry played Todd, a bongo-playing megalomaniac, who tries to introduce the song "Doggy Bounce" to the Conchords' repertoire, and a new band name: The Crazy Dogggz.

In 2010, Barry had a recurring role as a fictionalized version of himself in the second season of the live-action Adult Swim series Delocated, where he played a frequent associate of the Russian mafia characters, casually playing card games with them in their club. He had a recurring role as himself in Louis C.K.'s FX's series Louie.

Barry recorded the album Super Crazy on Comedy Central Records in 2012 . In 2014, he was featured wearing shorts on Season 3, Episode 4 of Jerry Seinfeld's web show Comedians in Cars Getting Coffee.

== Works ==
=== Discography ===
- Medium Energy (2001)
- Falling off the Bone (2004)
- From Heaven (2008)
- Super Crazy (2012)
- The Crowd Work Tour (2014)
- Spicy Honey (2017)
- Domestic Shorthair (2023)

=== Films ===
- Who's the Caboose? (1997) – Football Player
- Tomorrow Night (1998) – Man Caught in Rain (Director: Louis CK, 1998 Sundance selection)
- Los Enchiladas! (1999) – Duane (Director: Mitch Hedberg, 1999 Sundance selection)
- Road Trip (2000) – Campus Security Guard 1
- Pootie Tang (2001) – Greasy
- Borrowing Saffron (2002) – George (Director: Todd Barry, Woodstock Film Festival selection)
- Beer League (2006) – Creepy Guy Down the Shore
- The Wrestler (2008) – Wayne
- Pete Smalls Is Dead (2010) – Bob Withers
- Vamps (2012) – Ivan
- Wanderlust (2012) – Sherm
- The Crowd Work Tour (2014) – Himself
- Spicy Honey (2017) – Himself
- Domestic Shorthair (2023) – Himself

=== Television ===
- Aqua Teen Hunger Force, Romulox (three episodes)
- Dr. Katz, Professional Therapist – Himself
- At Home with Amy Sedaris – Handley
- Bored to Death – Dale Woodley
- Flight of the Conchords– Todd
- Wonder Showzen– Barold T. Mosley
- Sesame Street– #7
- Lucky Louie– Todd
- Talkshow with Spike Feresten– Himself-guest
- Chappelle's Show– Paul
- The Larry Sanders Show– Keith
- Spin City– Doug
- Sex and the City– Ordinary Guy
- Contest Searchlight– himself
- Tough Crowd with Colin Quinn– regular panelist
- Tom Goes to the Mayor– Saul
- Space Ghost Coast to Coast– Himself-guest ("Eat a Peach" episode)
- Home Movies– Video Store Clerk
- Lucy, the Daughter of the Devil– Ethan
- The Sarah Silverman Program– Nathan
- Louie– Fictional version of himself (eleven episodes)
- Delocated – Himself
- Bob's Burgers– Moolisa, Joel
- Deadbeat– Daniel L. Turner
- Master of None – Todd

=== Books ===
- Thank You for Coming to Hattiesburg (2017)

In April 2013, Barry started his own eponymous podcast, The Todd Barry Podcast.
