= Mitch Hedberg =

American stand-up comedian (1968–2005)

- Born: Mitchell Lee Hedberg; February 24, 1968; Saint Paul, Minnesota, U.S.
- Died: March 30, 2005 (aged 37); Livingston, New Jersey, U.S.
- Notable work: Strategic Grill Locations; Mitch All Together; Do You Believe in Gosh?
- Spouse: Lynn Shawcroft (m. 1999)

Comedy career
- Years active: 1989–2005
- Medium: Stand-up
- Genres: Observational comedy; surreal humor; word play; non sequitur; one-liner; deadpan
- Subjects: Recreational drug use; Everyday life; American culture; Self-deprecation; Drinking culture; Food
- Website: mitchhedberg.net

Mitchell Lee Hedberg (February 24, 1968 – March 30, 2005) was an American stand-up comedian. He was known for his one-liner comedy, characterized by surreal humor and his distinctive deadpan delivery, as well as his unconventional stage presence.

Hedberg rose to prominence through repeated appearances on Late Show with David Letterman, and was dubbed "the next Seinfeld" by Time. Throughout his career, he recorded three stand-up comedy albums, Strategic Grill Locations (1999), Mitch All Together (2003), and the posthumous Do You Believe in Gosh? (2008). He also wrote, directed, produced, and starred in the independent film Los Enchiladas! (1999), making further cameo appearances in Almost Famous (2000) and Lords of Dogtown (2005).

Hedberg struggled with substance abuse throughout his adult life, and died of an accidental overdose on March 30, 2005, at the age of 37. Because news of his death broke just before April Fools' Day, many initially believed reports of Hedberg's death were a hoax. He retained a cult following after his death, with Rolling Stone ranking him No. 20 on its 2017 list of the "50 Best Stand-Up Comics of All Time".

== Early life ==
Mitchell Lee Hedberg was born in Saint Paul, Minnesota on February 24, 1968, to Mary (née Schimscha; 1943–2012) and Arnold (Arne) Hedberg. He had two sisters, Wendy and Angie; Angie was five years younger than him. Hedberg was born with a congenital heart defect, and experienced chronic heart palpitations. He attended Ames Elementary School from kindergarten through sixth grade, and met lifelong friend and collaborator Tim Schlecht on his first day there. Both Schlecht and Hedberg's father, Arne, recalled that Hedberg was extremely shy during his childhood.

When I was 18, I was kind of sick of living here, so my friend Tim [Schlecht] and I packed up his Volaré. We moved from Minnesota to Florida. We wanted to move to Texas, but the front-end alignment was bad.

— Mitch Hedberg, during a stand-up routine

Hedberg attended Harding Senior High School in Saint Paul. He later stated in an interview that he was a straight-A student until his interest in school dropped around tenth grade. During his teenage years, Hedberg aspired to become a musician, and attempted to form a band with Schlecht, though this never materialized; he graduated from Harding in 1986. After graduating, he moved to Fort Lauderdale, Florida, and worked in restaurant kitchens, including Applebee's, having first worked at a Chi-Chi's during high school.

== Career ==
Hedberg began his stand-up career in Florida, and after a period of honing his skills, he moved to Seattle and began to tour. He soon appeared on MTV's Comikaze, followed by a 1996 appearance on the Late Show with David Letterman that brought him his big break. He won the 1997 grand prize at the Seattle Comedy Competition. The next year he appeared in an episode of Fox's series That '70s Show.

In 1999, he completed his own independent feature film, Los Enchiladas!, which he wrote, directed, produced, and starred in. He recorded three comedy albums: Strategic Grill Locations, Mitch All Together, and Do You Believe in Gosh?, the last released posthumously. He performed at the Just for Laughs comedy festival in Montreal three times: in 1998, 2001, and 2004.

Concurrent with his rising fame in the entertainment industry, Hedberg appeared on Letterman nine more times, signed a half-million-dollar deal with Fox for a television sitcom, and was dubbed "the next Seinfeld" by Time. George Carlin, Dave Chappelle, Mike Birbiglia, Norm Macdonald and Lewis Black were among his comedian fans. Comedians Anthony Jeselnik, Bo Burnham and Ron Funches have listed Hedberg as an influence.

On September 9, 2008, Comedy Central Records released the album Do You Believe in Gosh?, which contained material Hedberg recorded at The Improv in Ontario, California, in January 2005. Hedberg's wife Lynn wrote in the introduction that the performance had been in preparation for a year-end CD recording.

== Comedic style ==
Hedberg's stand-up comedy was characterized by short, surreal one-liners and absurd observations about everyday life, delivered in a distinctive low-energy, deadpan drawl. He often performed wearing sunglasses, with long hair covering his face, while staring down at the floor or at his feet. Hedberg suffered from stage fright throughout his career.

His one-liner comedy was often compared to that of Steven Wright, though Hedberg rejected the comparison. In 1998, Time magazine dubbed Hedberg "the next Seinfeld," though writer Sam Anderson, in a Slate article following Hedberg's death, argued that the comparison overlooked Seinfeld's "edge of social superiority" and the positivity in Hedberg's comedy, stating, "unlike Seinfeld, he was easy to like."

== Personal life ==
Shortly after launching his stand-up career in 1989, Hedberg began a long-term relationship with Jana Johnson—an art student—after meeting her in a bar in Fort Lauderdale, Florida. Later, he met Canadian comedian Lynn Shawcroft during a "New Faces" showcase at a Just for Laughs festival in 1996. Hedberg and Johnson broke up in October 1998, and he married Shawcroft the following February. Shawcroft toured with Hedberg as his opening act.

Hedberg had a history of recreational drug use, including heroin. By the time he met Shawcroft in 1996, he had already tried the drug. On June 23, 2003, Hedberg was arrested at the Austin-Bergstrom International Airport for heroin possession, spending two and a half days in jail, and six weeks in a hospital. An infection in his right leg led to rumors that the leg might need to be amputated. A successful operation precluded amputation, but he was left with a permanent limp.

In a December 2001 interview with Korn frontman Jonathan Davis for Penthouse, Davis asked Hedberg how he would end his own life if he could choose. Hedberg replied, "First I'd want to get famous, and then I'd overdose. If I overdosed at this stage in my career, I would be lucky if I made the back pages." On a March 17, 2005 interview for The Howard Stern Show two weeks before Hedberg's death, Howard Stern, prompted by Hedberg's mention of having his drug use under control, asked him if he knew how to use them responsibly, to which Hedberg replied "Yeah, you know, just for the creative side of it."

== Death ==
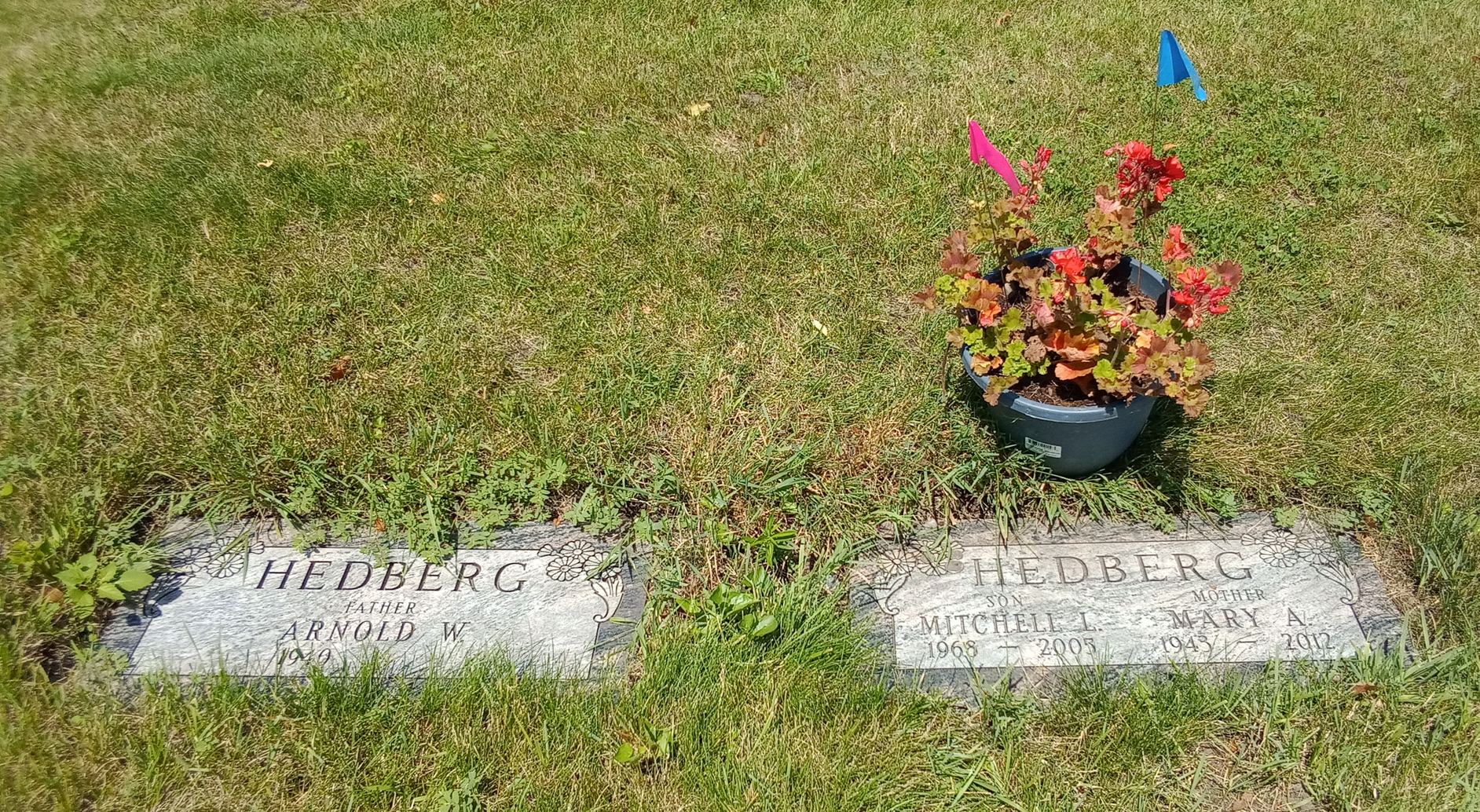
Hedberg's grave in Roseville, Minnesota

Following the conclusion of a 44-city tour on March 20, 2005, Hedberg and Shawcroft traveled between various hotels, reportedly avoiding phone calls from friends and family. On March 29, the couple checked into a hotel room in Livingston, New Jersey. Shawcroft later found Hedberg collapsed in their hotel room, (Note: Itzkoff's description of events states Shawcroft found Hedberg collapsed on March 29, though the date of his death was recorded as March 30.) and he was pronounced dead on the morning of March 30, 2005, at the age of 37.

The next morning, Hedberg was scheduled for a phone interview with the Kirk, Mark and Lopez morning show on the Baltimore radio station WIYY-FM. When the show's hosts called his number, a "distraught-sounding" woman answered, stated Hedberg was unavailable, and hung up. He was scheduled for five shows at the Baltimore Improv starting that night. Hedberg's death was first announced by Howard Stern on March 31. The timing of Stern's report led many to believe that the announcement of Hedberg's death was an April Fools' Day joke.

Early speculation suggested Hedberg's death may have been drug-related. His mother Mary initially dismissed these claims, attributing his death to heart failure related to a heart defect. However, in December 2005, the music magazine Spin obtained the official toxicology report from the New Jersey medical examiner's office, which formally ruled his cause of death as "multiple drug toxicity" resulting from an accidental overdose of cocaine and heroin.

Hedberg's funeral was held on April 5 at St. Ambrose Catholic Church in Woodbury, Minnesota. He was buried at Roselawn Cemetery in Roseville, Minnesota. His mother Mary was buried next to him following her death in 2012.

== Discography ==
List of studio albums, with selected chart positions
Title	Details	Peak chart positions				Certifications
Title	Details	US	US Comedy	US Indie	US Heat.	Certifications
Strategic Grill Locations	Released: 1999 (Note: Strategic Grill Locations was originally self-released by Hedberg in 1999. The album was re-released by Comedy Central Records in 2003.); Label: Comedy Central Records (2003 re-release); Format: CD, LP	—	4 (Note: The album's 2003 re-release charted in 2005.)	—	—	—
Mitch All Together	Released: December 9, 2003; Label: Comedy Central Records; Format: CD/DVD, LP	—	2	22	28	US: Gold
Do You Believe in Gosh?	Released: September 9, 2008; Label: Comedy Central Records; Format: CD, LP	18	1	1	—	—
The Complete Vinyl Collection	Released: November 4, 2016; Label: Comedy Central Records; Format: 4×LP	—	3	—	—	—
"—" denotes releases that did not chart.

== Filmography ==
=== Film ===
Mitch Hedberg film work
Year	Title	Role	Notes	Ref.
1999	Los Enchiladas!	Lee	Director and writer	
2000	Almost Famous	Eagles Road Manager		
2005	Lords of Dogtown	Urethane Wheels Guy	Posthumous release	

=== Television ===
Mitch Hedberg television work
Year	Title	Role	Notes
1995	Comedy Product	Himself	
1998	That '70s Show	Frank	Episode: "Eric's Buddy"
1998	Premium Blend	Himself	
1998	Late Show with David Letterman	Himself	10 episodes
1999	Dr. Katz, Professional Therapist	Himself	2 episodes
1999	Comedy Central Presents	Himself	
1999	The Late Late Show with Craig Kilborn	Himself	
1999	Home Movies	Dr. Fizzel, Eulogist, Mitch, Police Officer	
2001	Ed	Dave	Episode: "Losing Streak"
2001	Just for Laughs in Montreal	Himself	
2001	Late Friday	Himself	
2002	Saddle Rash	Voice role	Rejected Adult Swim pilot
2003	Late Night with Conan O'Brien	Himself	2 episodes
2003	Crank Yankers	Himself	
2004	Shorties Watchin' Shorties	Himself	Episode: "Oswalt, Hedberg, Caliendo, Morris"
