= King of the Hill season 7 =

King of the Hill
- Season 7
- DVD cover
- Showrunners: John Altschuler; Dave Krinsky
- Starring: Mike Judge; Kathy Najimy; Pamela Adlon; Brittany Murphy; Johnny Hardwick; Stephen Root; Toby Huss
- No. of episodes: 23

Release
- Original network: Fox
- Original release: November 3, 2002 – May 18, 2003

Season chronology
- ← Previous; Season 6 Next → Season 8

The seventh season of King of the Hill originally aired Sundays on the Fox Broadcasting Company at 8:30–9:00 p.m. (EST) and 7:30–8:00 p.m. (EST) from November 3, 2002, to May 18, 2003.

== Production ==
This was the first season that John Altschuler and Dave Krinsky were showrunners, and they would remain in this position for the remainder of King of the Hill's original run. The wackier stories from recent years began to be phased out. Series creator Mike Judge described the episodes from this season as "small personal stories like we did in the second season." In a 2007 interview with Animation World Network, Altschuler reflected that, "Mike was unhappy with the drift of the show around seasons four and five. Peggy just became crazy, Bobby just became gay, Hank started getting weaker and weaker until he was literally being ordered around by Dale." Altschuler added, "If you don't police characters on a daily basis, you go for jokes. 'Oh, it's funny that Peggy is mean to her family at this point.' 'Oh, okay, we're tired, let's do it again.' If you do it again and again, what happened was people started hating Peggy's character and felt distant from her. The show just kind of lost its way. What we've done since seasons six and seven was just work on getting the characters back to where they started and keeping them there."

"Goodbye Normal Jeans", a Thanksgiving episode, is the first episode from the 6ABE (Season 6) production line, and was originally supposed to air on November 18, 2001. However, Fox's NFL coverage ran late that night, so the episode was pre-empted, and since it was a Thanksgiving-themed episode and that was the last Sunday before Thanksgiving, the episode was held back until November 2002. "Pigmalion" takes place during Halloween, and came from the 5ABE (Season 5) production line. It was initially announced to air as a holdover for Season 6, that would have likely aired around Halloween 2001, although the episode was delayed for unspecified reasons (this may have been due to its disturbing content). "Pigmalion" was eventually shown as an "extra" episode for Season 7 in January 2003. At the time of airing, "Pigmalion" was absent from the episode listing on Fox's official King of the Hill website. In an early draft of the episode "Night and Deity", Dale fell for a woman who bore an obvious resemblance to Nancy. When the episode was originally announced, this plot point was mentioned on Fox's website.

"Megalo Dale" was the second King of the Hill episode to be done using digital ink and paint, after "Bobby Goes Nuts" from the previous season. Select scenes from "Board Games" and "The Miseducation of Bobby Hill" also utilized digital ink and paint, with the show eventually switching over to this production method during the eight season.

This was also the first season which did not include a Christmas episode, other than Season 1 which did not air any episodes during December.

== Episodes ==
No. overall	No. in season	Title	Directed by	Written by	Original release date	Prod. code	U.S. viewers (millions)
127	1	"Get Your Freak Off"	Tricia Garcia	Garland Testa	November 3, 2002	7ABE01	13.01
Hank takes Bobby and his friends to a music concert, but is dismayed to see Bobby and a friend dancing inappropriately to boy band music, so he tries to make Bobby's adolescence more wholesome. Meanwhile, Peggy, Nancy, and Minh try to decide who is the best-looking out of Hank, Dale, Boomhauer, Kahn, and Bill. Guest Stars: Eliza Dushku as Jordan Hilgren-Bronson, Milla Jovovich as Serena Shaw, Debra Messing as Mrs. Hilgren-Bronson and Elizabeth Perkins as Jan Shaw
128	2	"The Fat and the Furious"	Allan Jacobsen	Alex Gregory & Peter Huyck	November 10, 2002	7ABE03	10.74
Bill becomes a competitive eater after downing Hank's entire platter of hot dogs during a barbecue, but his dreams are soon crushed when Dale (who thinks competitive eating is degrading) beats him. Guest Stars: Pamela Anderson as Cyndi, Jeff Garlin as Dan, Kid Rock as himself and Courteney Cox as Sunny Edmunds
129	3	"Bad Girls, Bad Girls, Whatcha Gonna Do"	Kyounghee Lim & Boowhan Lim	Tom Saunders & Kell Cahoon	November 17, 2002	6ABE19	11.17
Connie's criminal cousin, Tid Pao (voiced by Lucy Liu), becomes Bobby's science project partner and makes him an unwitting accomplice in creating a drug lab. Guest Stars: Lucy Liu as Tid Pao
130	4	"Goodbye Normal Jeans"	Kyounghee Lim & Boowhan Lim	Kit Boss	November 24, 2002	6ABE01	12.92
Peggy becomes jealous of Bobby when he uses his Home Ec. class cooking skills in the Hill kitchen.
131	5	"Dances with Dogs"	Anthony Lioi	Norm Hiscock	December 1, 2002	7ABE02	11.68
Bobby and Hank use Ladybird to compete in a dog dancing contest. Meanwhile, Bill is tricked into buying an ill-tempered Rottweiler from an animal shelter. Guest Stars: Scott Hamilton as himself
132	6	"The Son Also Roses"	Dominic Polcino	Dan Sterling	December 8, 2002	6ABE22	10.84
Bobby becomes a rose grower when he tires of doing the Landry football team's laundry, and recruits the help of two cannabis cultivators to help him win a contest. Guest stars Michael Clarke Duncan as Morgan, a rose growing enthusiast.
133	7	"The Texas Skillsaw Massacre"	Shaun Cashman	Alan R. Cohen & Alan Freedland	December 15, 2002	6ABE18	13.41
The Hills are forced to live with the Gribbles after Dale digs a tunnel underneath the Hills' kitchen, and the inspector declares the Hill house uninhabitable until the necessary repairs are done. Things get worse when Hank is sentenced to take anger management classes after accidentally cutting one of Dale's fingers off with a circular saw.
134	8	"Full Metal Dust Jacket"	Adam Kuhlman	Dan McGrath	January 5, 2003	7ABE04	11.86
Peggy takes over the lease of a bookstore, but when the bookstore's business plummets, she allows Dale and his gun group to sell firearms at the store. Guest Stars: Peri Gilpin as Mary Ellen and Allison Janney as Laura
135	9	"Pigmalion"	Dominic Polcino	Jonathan Collier	January 12, 2003	5ABE23	7.02
Luanne becomes involved with the psychotic owner of a pork processing plant (voiced by Michael Keaton) who wants Luanne to be just like the woman on the company logo. Guest Stars: Michael Keaton as Trip Larsen
136	10	"Megalo Dale"	Cyndi Tang-Loveland	J.B. Cook	January 12, 2003	7ABE05	10.84
Dale is hired to exterminate at the Mega Lo Mart, but it turns out the "pest" is Chuck Mangione, the Mega Lo Mart spokesman. Guest Stars: That '70s Show co-stars Topher Grace as Chris and Danny Masterson as Cory, Tom Arnold as Norm Gladwell and Chuck Mangione as himself.
137	11	"Boxing Luanne"	Mike DiMartino	Dean Young	February 2, 2003	7ABE07	9.55
To prove to men that she is more than just a pretty face and a sexy body, Luanne becomes a boxer. By the time she finds out that Buck has paid all her opponents to take a dive, though, she is scheduled for a real bout against George Foreman's daughter, Freeda. Guest Stars: Bruce Dern as Randy Strickland, Carmen Electra as Angela, George Foreman as himself, Freeda Foreman as herself and George Foreman III as himself
138	12	"Vision Quest"	Dominic Polcino	Etan Cohen	February 9, 2003	7ABE09	8.25
John Redcorn is worried about how Dale is raising Joseph, so he gets Hank to take Joseph on a "vision quest", but Dale is the one who gets a vision and mistakenly believes that he is a Native American.
139	13	"Queasy Rider"	Wes Archer	Kit Boss	February 16, 2003	7ABE10	8.90
Hank and Peggy try to fix their strained marriage by buying a motorcycle and immersing themselves in the biker lifestyle, only to find that the biker lifestyle is very misogynistic. Guest Stars: Jamie Kennedy as Dr. Tim Rast and Jennifer Aniston as Pepperoni Sue/Stephanie
140	14	"Board Games"	Kyounghee Lim & Boowhan Lim	Sivert Glarum & Michael Jamin	March 2, 2003	7ABE08	8.84
Peggy, Nancy, and Minh run for school board against each other after Tom Landry Middle School cuts all after-school programs out of the budget -- and all three women will stop at nothing to get the empty seat.
141	15	"An Officer and a Gentle Boy"	Gary McCarver	Dan Sterling	March 9, 2003	7ABE06	9.72
Fed up with Bobby's laziness, Hank sends him off to Cotton's old military school Fort Berk Academy, but Cotton is dismayed that Fort Berk has softened up and sets out to make it as brutal as possible. Note: This the only episode where Dale, Bill, and Boomhauer do not appear.
142	16	"The Miseducation of Bobby Hill"	Tricia Garcia	Tim Croston & Chip Hall	March 16, 2003	7ABE11	7.72
Bobby becomes a salesman at Strickland Propane (although Hank doubts his ability, citing his inexperience) and uses underhanded tactics learned from Joe Jack to sell more grills. Meanwhile, Dale builds a Lawnchair Larry flight-inspired flying lawn chair and tests it out on Bill, who ends up battered, bruised, and lost in Mexico.
143	17	"The Good Buck"	Allan Jacobsen	Alex Gregory & Peter Huyck	March 30, 2003	7ABE13	7.46
Buck becomes a born-again Christian (courtesy of Luanne) after his wife divorces him, but Hank is worried that Buck only wants Luanne for sex. Meanwhile, Bobby hides out from his track coach and makes friends with two old ladies at Hotel Arlen's restaurant during tea time. Guest stars Dave Thomas as Lane Pratley.
144	18	"I Never Promised You an Organic Garden"	Adam Kuhlman	Tony Gama-Lobo & Rebecca May	April 13, 2003	7ABE14	6.51
Peggy takes over the organic garden at the school, but she is caught using pesticides on the garden when every organic treatment fails to save the garden from bug infestation.
145	19	"Be True to Your Fool"	Anthony Lioi	Dan McGrath	April 27, 2003	7ABE12	7.39
When Bill accidentally infects Hank, Dale, and Boomhauer with lice, they are forced to shave off their hair, only for Hank to discover the word "Bill" tattooed on the back of his head. Meanwhile, Bill befriends prisoners at the county jail after being arrested for being drunk in public.
146	20	"Racist Dawg"	Mike DiMartino	J.B. Cook	May 4, 2003	7ABE17	7.32
Peggy calls an African-American repairman (guest-voiced by Bernie Mac), whom Ladybird attacks, prompting the town to think that Hank and his dog are racists. Guest Stars: Bernie Mac as Mack the Repairman
147	21	"Night and Deity"	Gary McCarver	Garland Testa	May 11, 2003	7ABE16	7.68
After Bill attracts pigeons to the alley, Dale must work with an attractive female exterminator (voice of Janeane Garofalo), who makes Nancy jealous. Guest Stars: Janeane Garofalo as Sheila Refkin
148	22	"Maid in Arlen"	Kyounghee Lim & Boohwan Lim	Dan Sterling	May 18, 2003	7ABE18	4.84
Kahn's mother Laoma arrives and soon becomes the Hills' housekeeper, much to Kahn's annoyance. Bill and Laoma later enter into a romantic relationship that Kahn works overtime to sabotage. Guest Stars: Amy Hill as Laoma Souphanousinphone
149	23	"The Witches of East Arlen"	Matt Engstrom	Sivert Glarum & Michael Jamin	May 18, 2003	7ABE20	7.04
After losing out on playing Curly in the school production of Oklahoma!, Bobby gets involved with a group of post-adolescent geeks who are into tarot cards and witchcraft. Guest Stars: David Cross as Ward Rackley
