= King of the Hill season 6 =

King of the Hill
- Season 6
- DVD cover
- Showrunner: Jonathan Aibel; Glenn Berger
- Starring: Mike Judge; Kathy Najimy; Pamela Adlon; Brittany Murphy; Johnny Hardwick; Stephen Root; Toby Huss
- No. of episodes: 22

Release
- Original network: Fox
- Original release: November 11, 2001 – May 12, 2002

Season chronology
- ← Previous; Season 5 Next → Season 7

The sixth season of King of the Hill originally aired on Sundays at 7:30–8:00 p.m. (EST) on the Fox Broadcasting Company from November 11, 2001, to May 12, 2002.

== Production ==
The showrunners for the season were Jonathan Aibel and Glenn Berger, who took over from Richard Appel, the showrunner of Season 5 and co-showrunner of Seasons 3–4 with Greg Daniels. Aibel and Berger had worked on the show since Season 1, and took yearly trips to Texas to better understand the show's setting, as they were not native to the area. Shortly after becoming showrunners in 2001, Berger commented to the Los Angeles Times that, "my writing partner and I are both Ivy League-educated Jewish guys from the New York area", adding that, "for most of the country, it’s a really cool, smart show about people they know. For New York and L.A., it’s like an anthropological study."

Aibel and Berger departed in late 2001, as a result of unspecified tensions behind the scenes. Greg Daniels temporarily ran the show again following Aibel and Berger's departure. Daniels recalled that in the summer of 2001 he was tasked with making 1 to 2 minute syndication cuts for every episode, and said that re-watching all the episodes made him appreciate the show and inspired him to become closely involved again. Aibel and Berger would eventually be permanently replaced by John Altschuler and Dave Krinsky for Season 7 and beyond. Altschuler and Krinsky both originated from states in or near the U.S. South, unlike all the previous showrunners (with the exception of Mike Judge). Many Season 6 episodes were rewritten heavily after the animatics, to the point that Fox often announced plots that were different from the ones that aired.

"Bobby Goes Nuts" was the first King of the Hill episode to be done with digital ink and paint, although the opening sequence which appeared in every episode up until that point also utilized digital ink and paint. A nightmare sequence in the episode "Are You There God? It's Me, Margaret Hill" was later done with digital ink and paint this season, even though the rest of the episode had traditional cel animation. The show would not permanently switch over to this production method until the eighth season.

== Reception ==
In November 2001, Hal Boedeker of the Orlando Sentinel gave the season opener "Bobby Goes Nuts" a positive review, and described Fox's programming that night as "highly uneven: a clever King of the Hill, a mediocre Simpsons, an amusing Malcolm in the Middle and a pointless X-Files." Boedeker went on to write, "the sixth-season opener of King of the Hill manages the considerable feat of being more diverting than The Simpsons, and it does it with one of the hoariest bits of humor: the kick in the groin." The New York Post's Austin Smith praised the season final "Returning Japanese" in May 2002, writing that, "the episode figures to be the best of the season finales the networks have in store this week – cleverer by far than this Thursday’s baby hijinks on NBC’s Friends and Will & Grace. Those plotlines sound as desperate as this Tuesday’s episode of Frasier, in which Frasier stumbles into bed with Roz." Smith noted that King of the Hill "wasn’t always easy to love at first, [but] today – six seasons later – stands out as one of the most creative and best-written shows on TV."

In his 2006 review for the DVD release, IGN's Tal Blevins labelled it "a great season with no real stinkers." Blevins praised the episode "Bobby Goes Nuts", commenting that it "includes one of the most memorable lines ever uttered on television." In his review of the Season 6 DVD, Jesse Hassenger of PopMatters described "Bobby Goes Nuts" as one of "the show’s finest episodes." Hassenger also observed that, "by season six, Peggy’s scales have tipped towards buffoonery; she essentially plays the bumbling, dim husband role. This role reversal is potentially clever, especially when Peggy’s decency, like Hank’s, is allowed to shine through." Screen Rant later ranked "Bobby Goes Nuts" first on their list of the show's top 25 episodes in 2023.

In a retrospective 2009 article, Jaime Weinman of Canadian magazine Maclean's had a more critical view of the season, writing that "the show continues to have some of the story arcs and emotional development (including having Bobby break up with his girlfriend) but the wackiness gets seriously out of hand: one episode combines a secret brainwashing cult and a car full of birds (emus, to be precise) in the same story." It has been mentioned that co-creator Mike Judge wasn't pleased with the overall direction of King of the Hill in the early 2000s, and that some involved with the show disliked the episodes "Returning Japanese", "Tankin' It to the Streets" and "Yankee Hankee" (from Season 5), due to their outlandish plots and the changes they made to the show's continuity. The Season 11 episode "Lucky's Wedding Suit", which was originally intended to be the series final, had an ending scene in the alley which explained that the episodes "Yankee Hankee" and "Tankin' It to the Streets" were just dreams Bill had after eating at a Hungarian restaurant. When the show got uncancelled by Fox, this scene was removed.

== Episodes ==
No. overall	No. in season	Title	Directed by	Written by	Original release date	Prod. code	U.S. viewers (millions)
105	1	"Bobby Goes Nuts"	Tricia Garcia	Norm Hiscock	November 11, 2001	5ABE24	11.14
After getting attacked at a slumber party by Chane Wassanasong, Hank lets Bobby sign up for a boxing class at the YMCA, but Bobby ends up taking a women's self-defense course, where Bobby is taught to attack his aggressors by kicking them in the groin—including his own father, after Hank tries to teach Bobby the proper way to fight. Note: This episode was nominated for the Primetime Emmy Award for Outstanding Animated Program (for Programming Less Than One Hour) in 2002 but lost to the Futurama episode "Roswell That Ends Well".
106	2	"Soldier of Misfortune"	Anthony Lioi	J.B. Cook	December 9, 2001	6ABE02	8.19
Dale is running for re-election as the Arlen Gun Club president, but his chances seem to be shot when he accidentally discharges his gun. To restore Dale's confidence, Hank pretends to be "Mr. Big", answers Dale's ad in Soldier of Fortune magazine, and assigns Dale to pick up a briefcase. But Dale bungles the job and nearly gets his friends killed by his opponent at the Gun Club. Guest Stars: Gary Busey as Mad Dog.
107	3	"Lupe's Revenge"	Allan Jacobsen	Dean Young	December 12, 2001	5ABE13	6.26
Peggy takes the school Spanish club on a field trip to Mexico, and ends up in trouble for kidnapping a Mexican girl named Lupe, thanks to Peggy's horrible comprehension of the Spanish language. Meanwhile, Hank finds himself the object of the affections of a female police officer (voiced by Kathy Bates), who keeps pulling him over for various reasons in order to spend time with him. Guest Stars: Kathy Bates as Police Officer Jane Cooper.
108	4	"The Father, the Son, and J.C."	Tricia Garcia	Etan Cohen	December 16, 2001	6ABE04	9.09
While building a Habitat for Humanity house with former U.S. President Jimmy Carter, Buck promotes Hank to manager of Strickland Propane and Hank gushes with emotion to Buck, which doesn't sit well with Hank's father, Cotton.
109	5	"Father of the Bribe"	Cyndi Tang-Loveland	Dean Young	January 6, 2002	6ABE06	7.92
Kahn tries to bribe Bobby to break up with Connie. Connie and Bobby decide to pretend to break up so they can get the money. When a schoolteacher thinks Connie may be suicidal after Connie writes a note that reads "I'm so bored, I could kill myself" (which was a response to a dull lecture), her parents try to push her and Bobby back together. After endless double dates with the parents, they become tired of each other, and decide to break up, to Kahn's horror. Meanwhile, Dale hosts a pirated radio show.
110	6	"I'm with Cupid"	Allan Jacobsen	John Altschuler & Dave Krinsky	February 10, 2002	6ABE09	8.12
Following the events from the previous episode, Bobby seems fine in regards to his breakup with Connie and the upcoming Valentine's Day. However, when he is left home alone while Peggy and Hank go out, Bill depresses Bobby by suggesting that Bobby blew his only shot at true love. Guest Stars: Tara Strong as Debby
111	7	"Torch Song Hillogy"	Anthony Lioi	Emily Spivey	February 17, 2002	6ABE12	7.16
Peggy nominates Bobby to carry the 2002 Winter Olympic Torch through Arlen, but Hank wins the honor—and bungles it. Phil LaMarr as torch carrier #2
112	8	"Joust Like a Woman"	Dominic Polcino	Garland Testa	February 24, 2002	6ABE03	5.77
Peggy works as a cleaning wench at a Renaissance Faire, where her boss (Alan Rickman) refuses to give his female workers equal pay and benefits. Guest Stars: Alan Rickman as King Phillip and Laura Dern as Cleaning Wench; NOTE: Following news of suicides related to anti-gay bullying in late 2010 (and heightened public concern about bullying and homophobic harassment), Adult Swim cut a short scene where two teenagers call King Phillip's performance "gay" ("That is so gay"). As of February 9, 2012, the scene has been reinstated.
113	9	"The Bluegrass Is Always Greener"	Tricia Garcia	Norm Hiscock	February 24, 2002	6ABE14	7.97
Connie and the guys form a bluegrass band and head to Branson, Missouri, against Kahn's wishes. Guest Stars: Vince Gill as Boomhauer's singing voice, Charlie Daniels as Himself and Yakov Smirnoff as Himself.
114	10	"The Substitute Spanish Prisoner"	Kyounghee Lim & Boowhan Lim	Etan Cohen	March 3, 2002	5ABE21	9.24
After handing back tests to her class, Peggy is dumbfounded when Dooley asks her to explain the answer to a question. To restore her self-confidence, Peggy takes an Internet IQ test and discovers that she qualifies for "genius" status, but discovers that the IQ test is a scam when she blows Hank's retirement fund on a diploma. She then plans a risky counter-con against the scam's organizer (voice of Jeff Goldblum) to get everyone's money back. Guest Stars: Jeff Goldblum as Dr. Robert Vayzosa
115	11	"Unfortunate Son"	Anthony Lioi	Alex Gregory & Peter Huyck	March 10, 2002	5ABE20	8.07
Cotton's VFW is in dire straits as members are dying and the veterans are behind on their propane bill, so the VFW moves to Hank's house, but the inclusion of Vietnam War veterans angers Cotton and the WWII vets and leads to an increasingly dangerous situation.
116	12	"Are You There God? It's Me, Margaret Hill"	Gary McCarver	Sivert Glarum & Michael Jamin	March 17, 2002	6ABE07	7.17
Peggy (who is Methodist) must pretend she is a nun after she gets a job at a Catholic school, but fears that lying about her religion will cost her her immortal soul.
117	13	"Tankin' It to the Streets"	Monte Young	Alan R. Cohen & Alan Freedland	March 31, 2002	6ABE10	6.61
After Bill finds out the Army subjected him to a secret medical experiment called "Operation Infinite Walrus" that left him fat and balding, he gets drunk and steals a tank, leaving his friends to try to save him from life in prison. Meanwhile, Peggy and Bobby try to win a free ice cream sundae from the Mega Lo-Mart's "Guess Your Sundae's Weight" contest.
118	14	"Of Mice and Little Green Men"	Shaun Cashman	Sivert Glarum & Michael Jamin	April 7, 2002	6ABE08	7.09
When Hank and Dale find they have more in common with each other's sons than with their own, Dale finally concludes that Joseph is not his biological son – and jumps to the wild conclusion that Joseph's biological father is an extraterrestrial who impregnated Nancy while he was gone.
119	15	"A Man Without a Country Club"	Kyounghee Lim & Boowhan Lim	Kit Boss	April 14, 2002	6ABE11	5.93
Hank is asked to join the exclusive all-Asian Nine Rivers Country Club, which doesn't sit well with Kahn, who's been on the club's waiting list for the longest time – or with Hank, after he discovers that he's only been chosen because Nine Rivers needs a white man to show the PGA members that the club is racially diverse.
120	16	"Beer and Loathing"	Dominic Polcino	Etan Cohen	April 14, 2002	6ABE13	9.65
Peggy gets a job with Alamo beer – and learns that the company is knowingly selling tainted beer. Guest Stars: Megan Mullally as Teresa.
121	17	"Fun with Jane and Jane"	Adam Kuhlman	Garland Testa	April 21, 2002	6ABE15	7.69
Luanne and Peggy unwittingly join a cult disguised as a college sorority. Meanwhile, Hank and his buddies try to find a place to hide Buck Strickland's emus after being ordered to kill them. Guest Stars: Anna Faris as Lisa and Tara Strong as Jane
122	18	"My Own Private Rodeo"	Cyndi Tang-Loveland	Alex Gregory & Peter Huyck	April 28, 2002	6ABE16	9.36
Dale and Nancy renew their wedding vows, and Nancy invites Dale's father, a gay man whom Dale detests for supposedly trying to win Nancy's affections away from him, to the ceremony.
123	19	"Sug Night"	Adam Kuhlman	Alex Gregory & Peter Huyck	May 5, 2002	6ABE05	4.95
Hank freaks out when he begins having allegedly erotic dreams about grilling hamburgers naked with Dale's wife, Nancy.
124	20	"Dang Ol' Love"	Gary McCarver	Dean Young	May 5, 2002	6ABE17	6.57
Boomhauer falls in love with a woman (voiced by Laura Linney) who wants only a casual relationship, which crushes Boomhauer now that he feels like the many women he has seduced in the past, while Bill recovers from losing that same woman and finds advice that helps his friend. Guest Stars: Laura Linney as Marlene
125	21	"Returning Japanese"	Allan Jacobsen	Kit Boss & Etan Cohen	May 12, 2002	6ABE20	4.91
126	22	"Returning Japanese"	Anthony Lioi	Alex Gregory & Peter Huyck	May 12, 2002	6ABE21	4.91
Cotton wants to return to Japan to apologize to the widow of a soldier he killed, and Peggy arranges to bring the family along. Hank is shocked to discover that Cotton actually had an affair with the widow and fathered another son—Junichiro. When Junichiro renounces his Hill ancestry, Cotton declares his own personal war on Japan by deciding to spit in the Japanese emperor's face. Guest Stars: David Carradine as Junichiro and Amy Hill as Michiko NOTE: On the 2006 DVD release, this is presented as a single, continuous episode, under the title "Returning Japanese (Parts 1 & 2)". On Hulu and syndication packages, it is presented as two separate episodes.
