= List of King of the Hill episodes =

King of the Hill is an American animated television series sitcom that was created by Mike Judge and Greg Daniels for the Fox Broadcasting Company. The series focuses on the Hills, a middle-class American family in the fictional city of Arlen, Texas. The show originally aired from January 12, 1997, to May 6, 2010. A total of 259 initial episodes were produced, spanning 13 seasons.

== Series overview ==
Season	Episodes		Originally released		
Season	Episodes		First released	Last released	Network
1	12		January 12, 1997	May 11, 1997	Fox
2	23		September 21, 1997	May 17, 1998	Fox
3	25		September 15, 1998	May 18, 1999	Fox
4	24		September 26, 1999	May 21, 2000	Fox
5	20		October 1, 2000	May 13, 2001	Fox
6	22		November 11, 2001	May 12, 2002	Fox
7	23		November 3, 2002	May 18, 2003	Fox
8	22		November 2, 2003	May 23, 2004	Fox
9	15		November 7, 2004	May 15, 2005	Fox
10	15		September 18, 2005	May 14, 2006	Fox
11	12		January 28, 2007	May 20, 2007	Fox
12	22		September 23, 2007	May 18, 2008	Fox
13	24	20	September 28, 2008	September 13, 2009	Fox
13	24	4	May 3, 2010	May 6, 2010	First-run syndication
14	10		August 4, 2025		Hulu
15	10		July 20, 2026		Hulu

== Episodes ==
=== Season 1 (1997) ===
No. overall	No. in season	Title	Directed by	Written by	Original release date	Prod. code	U.S. viewers (millions)
1	1	"Pilot"	Wes Archer	Mike Judge & Greg Daniels	January 12, 1997	4E01	19.92
2	2	"Square Peg"	Gary McCarver	Joe Stillman	January 19, 1997	4E02	14.32
3	3	"The Order of the Straight Arrow"	Klay Hall	Cheryl Holliday	February 2, 1997	4E03	18.93
4	4	"Hank's Got the Willies"	Monte Young	Johnny Hardwick	February 9, 1997	4E05	15.30
5	5	"Luanne's Saga"	Pat Shinagawa	Paul Lieberstein	February 16, 1997	4E04	17.49
6	6	"Hank's Unmentionable Problem"	Adam Kuhlman	Greg Daniels & Mike Judge	February 23, 1997	4E07	15.05
7	7	"Westie Side Story"	Brian Sheesley	Jonathan Aibel & Glenn Berger	March 2, 1997	4E06	16.25
8	8	"Shins of the Father"	Martin Archer Jr.	Alan R. Cohen & Alan Freedland	March 23, 1997	4E08	15.89
9	9	"Peggy the Boggle Champ"	Chuck Sheetz	Jonathan Aibel & Glenn Berger	April 13, 1997	4E09	15.42
10	10	"Keeping Up with Our Joneses"	John Rice	Jonathan Collier & Joe Stillman	April 27, 1997	4E10	17.37
11	11	"King of the Ant Hill"	Gary McCarver	Johnny Hardwick & Paul Lieberstein	May 4, 1997	4E13	12.64
12	12	"Plastic White Female"	Jeff Myers	David Zuckerman	May 11, 1997	4E11	13.25

=== Season 2 (1997–98) ===
No. overall	No. in season	Title	Directed by	Written by	Original release date	Prod. code	U.S. viewers (millions)
13	1	"How to Fire a Rifle Without Really Trying"	Adam Kuhlman	Paul Lieberstein	September 21, 1997	5E01	17.34
14	2	"Texas City Twister"	Jeff Myers	Cheryl Holliday	September 28, 1997	5E02	15.81
15	3	"Arrow Head"	Klay Hall	Jonathan Aibel and Glenn Berger	October 19, 1997	5E04	13.58
16	4	"Hilloween"	John Rice	David Zuckerman	October 26, 1997	5E06	17.92
17	5	"Jumpin' Crack Bass (It's a Gas, Gas, Gas)"	Gary McCarver	Alan R. Cohen & Alan Freedland	November 2, 1997	5E03	19.64
18	6	"Husky Bobby"	Martin Archer	Jonathan Collier	November 9, 1997	5E05	20.04
19	7	"The Man Who Shot Cane Skretteburg"	Monte Young	Johnny Hardwick	November 16, 1997	5E07	21.56
20	8	"The Son That Got Away"	Tricia Garcia	Jim Dauterive	November 23, 1997	5E08	18.30
21	9	"The Company Man"	Klay Hall	Jim Dauterive	December 7, 1997	4E12	18.17
22	10	"Bobby Slam"	Chris Moeller	Gina Fattore	December 14, 1997	5E10	18.27
23	11	"The Unbearable Blindness of Laying"	Cyndi Tang	Paul Lieberstein	December 21, 1997	5E09	17.21
24	12	"Meet the Manger Babies"	Jeff Myers	Jonathan Aibel & Glenn Berger	January 11, 1998	5E12	19.71
25	13	"Snow Job"	Adam Kuhlman	Cheryl Holliday, Alan R. Cohen & Alan Freedland, and Jim Dauterive	February 1, 1998	5E11	15.20
26	14	"I Remember Mono"	Wes Archer	Paul Lieberstein	February 8, 1998	5E13	16.38
27	15	"Three Days of the Kahndo"	Lauren MacMullan	John Altschuler & Dave Krinsky	February 15, 1998	5E15	16.77
28	16	"Traffic Jam"	Klay Hall	Johnny Hardwick	February 22, 1998	5E14	16.81
29	17	"Hank's Dirty Laundry"	Shaun Cashman	Jonathan Aibel & Glenn Berger	March 1, 1998	5E16	18.60
30	18	"The Final Shinsult"	Jack Dyer	Alan R. Cohen & Alan Freedland	March 15, 1998	5E17	15.57
31	19	"Leanne's Saga"	Tricia Garcia	David Zuckerman	April 19, 1998	5E18	14.49
32	20	"Junkie Business"	Cyndi Tang	Jim Dauterive	April 26, 1998	5E19	15.97
33	21	"Life in the Fast Lane, Bobby's Saga"	Adam Kuhlman	John Altschuler & Dave Krinsky	May 3, 1998	5E21	15.27
34	22	"Peggy's Turtle Song"	Jeff Myers	Brent Forrester	May 10, 1998	5E22	14.32
35	23	"Propane Boom" (Part 1)	Gary McCarver	Norm Hiscock	May 17, 1998	5E23	16.03

=== Season 3 (1998–99) ===
No. overall	No. in season	Title	Directed by	Written by	Original release date	Prod. code	U.S. viewers (millions)
36	1	"Propane Boom II: Death of a Propane Salesman" (Part 2)	Lauren MacMullan	Alan R. Cohen & Alan Freedland	September 15, 1998	5E24	10.92
37	2	"And They Call It Bobby Love"	Cyndi Tang	Norm Hiscock	September 22, 1998	3ABE01	7.49
38	3	"Peggy's Headache"	Chris Moeller	Joe Stillman	October 6, 1998	5E20	7.70
39	4	"Pregnant Paws"	Chris Moeller	Jonathan Aibel & Glenn Berger	October 13, 1998	3ABE02	7.75
40	5	"Next of Shin"	Jeff Myers	Alan R. Cohen & Alan Freedland	November 3, 1998	3ABE05	8.24
41	6	"Peggy's Pageant Fever"	Tricia Garcia	Norm Hiscock	November 10, 1998	3ABE07	9.11
42	7	"Nine Pretty Darn Angry Men"	Shaun Cashman	Jim Dauterive	November 17, 1998	3ABE08	8.23
43	8	"Good Hill Hunting"	Klay Hall	Joe Stillman	December 1, 1998	3ABE04	9.15
44	9	"Pretty, Pretty Dresses"	Dominic Polcino	Paul Lieberstein	December 15, 1998	3ABE10	7.90
45	10	"A Firefighting We Will Go"	Cyndi Tang-Loveland	Alan R. Cohen & Alan Freedland	January 12, 1999	3ABE11	9.04
46	11	"To Spank, with Love"	Adam Kuhlman	David Zuckerman	January 19, 1999	3ABE03	9.27
47	12	"Three Coaches and a Bobby"	Chris Moeller	Johnny Hardwick	January 26, 1999	3ABE12	8.47
48	13	"De-Kahnstructing Henry"	Klay Hall	Paul Lieberstein	February 2, 1999	3ABE14	9.65
49	14	"The Wedding of Bobby Hill"	Jack Dyer	Jonathan Collier	February 9, 1999	3ABE09	8.05
50	15	"Sleight of Hank"	Jeff Myers	Jonathan Aibel & Glenn Berger	February 16, 1999	3ABE15	8.52
51	16	"Jon Vitti Presents: 'Return to La Grunta'"	Gary McCarver	Jon Vitti	February 23, 1999	3ABE06	7.88
52	17	"Escape from Party Island"	Gary McCarver	Jonathan Collier	March 16, 1999	3ABE16	7.71
53	18	"Love Hurts and So Does Art"	Adam Kuhlman	John Altschuler & Dave Krinsky	March 23, 1999	3ABE13	8.02
54	19	"Hank's Cowboy Movie"	Shaun Cashman	Jim Dauterive	April 6, 1999	3ABE18	7.08
55	20	"Dog Dale Afternoon"	Tricia Garcia	Jon Vitti	April 13, 1999	3ABE17	8.81
56	21	"Revenge of the Lutefisk"	Jack Dyer	Jonathan Aibel & Glenn Berger	April 20, 1999	3ABE19	7.41
57	22	"Death and Texas"	Wes Archer	John Altschuler & Dave Krinsky	April 27, 1999	3ABE20	7.94
58	23	"Wings of the Dope"	Cyndi Tang-Loveland	Johnny Hardwick	May 4, 1999	3ABE21	6.76
59	24	"Take Me Out of the Ball Game"	Chris Moeller	Alan R. Cohen & Alan Freedland	May 11, 1999	3ABE22	7.24
60	25	"As Old as the Hills..." (Part 1)	Adam Kuhlman	Norm Hiscock	May 18, 1999	3ABE23	7.18

=== Season 4 (1999–2000) ===
No. overall	No. in season	Title	Directed by	Written by	Original release date	Prod. code	U.S. viewers (millions)
61	1	"...Peggy Hill: The Decline and Fall" (Part 2)	Klay Hall	Paul Lieberstein	September 26, 1999	3ABE24	9.74
62	2	"Cotton's Plot"	Anthony Lioi	Jonathan Aibel & Glenn Berger	October 3, 1999	4ABE01	7.54
63	3	"Bills Are Made to Be Broken"	Jeff Myers	John Altschuler & Dave Krinsky	October 24, 1999	4ABE02	6.68
64	4	"Little Horrors of Shop"	Adam Kuhlman	Kit Boss	October 31, 1999	4ABE03	9.76
65	5	"Aisle 8A"	Allan Jacobsen	Garland Testa	November 7, 1999	4ABE04	8.53
66	6	"A Beer Can Named Desire"	Chuck Austen and Chris Moeller	Jim Dauterive	November 14, 1999	4ABE05	10.20
67	7	"Happy Hank's Giving"	Martin Archer	Alan R. Cohen & Alan Freedland	November 21, 1999	4ABE08	11.45
68	8	"Not in My Back-hoe"	Shaun Cashman	Paul Lieberstein	November 28, 1999	4ABE06	9.60
69	9	"To Kill a Ladybird"	Wes Archer	Norm Hiscock	December 12, 1999	4ABE07	10.77
70	10	"Hillennium"	Tricia Garcia	Johnny Hardwick	December 19, 1999	4ABE10	8.07
71	11	"Old Glory"	Gary McCarver	Norm Hiscock	January 9, 2000	4ABE09	10.25
72	12	"Rodeo Days"	Cyndi Tang-Loveland	Jon Vitti	January 16, 2000	4ABE11	11.63
73	13	"Hanky Panky" (Part 1)	Jeff Myers	Jim Dauterive	February 6, 2000	4ABE13	9.50
74	14	"High Anxiety" (Part 2)	Adam Kuhlman	Alan R. Cohen & Alan Freedland	February 13, 2000	4ABE14	10.88
75	15	"Naked Ambition"	Anthony Lioi	Jonathan Aibel & Glenn Berger	February 20, 2000	4ABE12	10.24
76	16	"Movin' on Up"	Klay Hall	Garland Testa	February 27, 2000	4ABE16	10.95
77	17	"Bill of Sales"	Dominic Polcino	Paul Lieberstein	March 12, 2000	4ABE15	9.35
78	18	"Won't You Pimai Neighbor?"	Kyounghee Lim & Boowhan Lim	John Altschuler & Dave Krinsky	March 19, 2000	4ABE18	9.37
79	19	"Hank's Bad Hair Day"	Gary McCarver	Jon Vitti	April 9, 2000	4ABE19	8.16
80	20	"Meet the Propaniacs"	Shaun Cashman	Kit Boss	April 16, 2000	4ABE17	6.83
81	21	"Nancy Boys"	Tricia Garcia	Jonathan Aibel & Glenn Berger	April 30, 2000	4ABE20	7.81
82	22	"Flush with Power"	Allan Jacobsen	Alex Gregory & Peter Huyck	May 7, 2000	4ABE22	6.86
83	23	"Transnational Amusements Presents: Peggy's Magic Sex Feet"	Cyndi Tang-Loveland	Jonathan Collier	May 14, 2000	4ABE21	7.93
84	24	"Peggy's Fan Fair"	Jeff Myers	Alan R. Cohen & Alan Freedland	May 21, 2000	4ABE23	7.22

=== Season 5 (2000–01) ===
No. overall	No. in season	Title	Directed by	Written by	Original release date	Prod. code	U.S. viewers (millions)
85	1	"The Perils of Polling"	Kyounghee Lim & Boohwan Lim	Jim Dauterive	October 1, 2000	5ABE02	9.59
86	2	"The Buck Stops Here"	Mike DiMartino	Norm Hiscock	November 5, 2000	5ABE01	11.53
87	3	"I Don't Want To Wait For Our Lives To Be Over, I Want To Know Right Now, Will It Be... Sorry. Do Do Doo Do Do, Do Do Doo Do Do, Do Do Doo Do Do, Doo..."	Adam Kuhlman	Paul Lieberstein	November 12, 2000	4ABE24	11.56
88	4	"Spin the Choice"	Allan Jacobsen	Paul Lieberstein	November 19, 2000	5ABE05	10.22
89	5	"Peggy Makes the Big Leagues"	Dominic Polcino	Johnny Hardwick	November 26, 2000	5ABE04	8.44
90	6	"When Cotton Comes Marching Home"	Tricia Garcia	Alan R. Cohen & Alan Freedland	December 3, 2000	5ABE03	9.53
91	7	"What Makes Bobby Run?"	Cyndi Tang-Loveland	Alex Gregory & Peter Huyck	December 10, 2000	5ABE07	11.87
92	8	"Twas the Nut Before Christmas"	Jeff Myers	John Altschuler & Dave Krinsky	December 17, 2000	5ABE08	11.71
93	9	"Chasing Bobby"	A. Lioi	Garland Testa	January 21, 2001	5ABE10	10.33
94	10	"Yankee Hankee"	Adam Kuhlman	Kit Boss	February 4, 2001	5ABE06	11.46
95	11	"Hank and the Great Glass Elevator"	Gary McCarver	Jonathan Collier	February 11, 2001	5ABE12	9.68
96	12	"Now Who's the Dummy?"	Dominic Polcino	Johnny Hardwick	February 18, 2001	5ABE14	10.07
97	13	"Ho Yeah!"	Tricia Garcia	Alex Gregory & Peter Huyck	February 25, 2001	5ABE15	11.55
98	14	"The Exterminator"	Shaun Cashman	Dean Young	March 4, 2001	5ABE09	10.39
99	15	"Luanne Virgin 2.0"	Adam Kuhlman	Kit Boss	March 11, 2001	5ABE16	9.29
100	16	"Hank's Choice"	Kyounghee Lim & Boohwan Lim	Jon Vitti	April 1, 2001	5ABE11	7.52
101	17	"It's Not Easy Being Green"	Jeff Myers	John Altschuler & Dave Krinsky	April 8, 2001	5ABE18	7.66
102	18	"The Trouble with Gribbles"	Shaun Cashman	Jim Dauterive	April 22, 2001	5ABE19	7.85
103	19	"Hank's Back Story"	Cyndi Tang-Loveland	Alan R. Cohen & Alan Freedland	May 6, 2001	5ABE17	8.54
104	20	"Kidney Boy and Hamster Girl: A Love Story"	Gary McCarver	Garland Testa	May 13, 2001	5ABE22	8.17

=== Season 6 (2001–02) ===
No. overall	No. in season	Title	Directed by	Written by	Original release date	Prod. code	U.S. viewers (millions)
105	1	"Bobby Goes Nuts"	Tricia Garcia	Norm Hiscock	November 11, 2001	5ABE24	11.14
106	2	"Soldier of Misfortune"	Anthony Lioi	J.B. Cook	December 9, 2001	6ABE02	8.19
107	3	"Lupe's Revenge"	Allan Jacobsen	Dean Young	December 12, 2001	5ABE13	6.26
108	4	"The Father, the Son, and J.C."	Tricia Garcia	Etan Cohen	December 16, 2001	6ABE04	9.09
109	5	"Father of the Bribe"	Cyndi Tang-Loveland	Dean Young	January 6, 2002	6ABE06	7.92
110	6	"I'm with Cupid"	Allan Jacobsen	John Altschuler & Dave Krinsky	February 10, 2002	6ABE09	8.12
111	7	"Torch Song Hillogy"	Anthony Lioi	Emily Spivey	February 17, 2002	6ABE12	7.16
112	8	"Joust Like a Woman"	Dominic Polcino	Garland Testa	February 24, 2002	6ABE03	5.77
113	9	"The Bluegrass Is Always Greener"	Tricia Garcia	Norm Hiscock	February 24, 2002	6ABE14	7.97
114	10	"The Substitute Spanish Prisoner"	Kyounghee Lim & Boowhan Lim	Etan Cohen	March 3, 2002	5ABE21	9.24
115	11	"Unfortunate Son"	Anthony Lioi	Alex Gregory & Peter Huyck	March 10, 2002	5ABE20	8.07
116	12	"Are You There God? It's Me, Margaret Hill"	Gary McCarver	Sivert Glarum & Michael Jamin	March 17, 2002	6ABE07	7.17
117	13	"Tankin' It to the Streets"	Monte Young	Alan R. Cohen & Alan Freedland	March 31, 2002	6ABE10	6.61
118	14	"Of Mice and Little Green Men"	Shaun Cashman	Sivert Glarum & Michael Jamin	April 7, 2002	6ABE08	7.09
119	15	"A Man Without a Country Club"	Kyounghee Lim & Boowhan Lim	Kit Boss	April 14, 2002	6ABE11	5.93
120	16	"Beer and Loathing"	Dominic Polcino	Etan Cohen	April 14, 2002	6ABE13	9.65
121	17	"Fun with Jane and Jane"	Adam Kuhlman	Garland Testa	April 21, 2002	6ABE15	7.69
122	18	"My Own Private Rodeo"	Cyndi Tang-Loveland	Alex Gregory & Peter Huyck	April 28, 2002	6ABE16	9.36
123	19	"Sug Night"	Adam Kuhlman	Alex Gregory & Peter Huyck	May 5, 2002	6ABE05	4.95
124	20	"Dang Ol' Love"	Gary McCarver	Dean Young	May 5, 2002	6ABE17	6.57
125	21	"Returning Japanese"	Allan Jacobsen	Kit Boss & Etan Cohen	May 12, 2002	6ABE20	4.91
126	22	"Returning Japanese"	Anthony Lioi	Alex Gregory & Peter Huyck	May 12, 2002	6ABE21	4.91

=== Season 7 (2002–03) ===
No. overall	No. in season	Title	Directed by	Written by	Original release date	Prod. code	U.S. viewers (millions)
127	1	"Get Your Freak Off"	Tricia Garcia	Garland Testa	November 3, 2002	7ABE01	13.01
128	2	"The Fat and the Furious"	Allan Jacobsen	Alex Gregory & Peter Huyck	November 10, 2002	7ABE03	10.74
129	3	"Bad Girls, Bad Girls, Whatcha Gonna Do"	Kyounghee Lim & Boowhan Lim	Tom Saunders & Kell Cahoon	November 17, 2002	6ABE19	11.17
130	4	"Goodbye Normal Jeans"	Kyounghee Lim & Boowhan Lim	Kit Boss	November 24, 2002	6ABE01	12.92
131	5	"Dances with Dogs"	Anthony Lioi	Norm Hiscock	December 1, 2002	7ABE02	11.68
132	6	"The Son Also Roses"	Dominic Polcino	Dan Sterling	December 8, 2002	6ABE22	10.84
133	7	"The Texas Skillsaw Massacre"	Shaun Cashman	Alan R. Cohen & Alan Freedland	December 15, 2002	6ABE18	13.41
134	8	"Full Metal Dust Jacket"	Adam Kuhlman	Dan McGrath	January 5, 2003	7ABE04	11.86
135	9	"Pigmalion"	Dominic Polcino	Jonathan Collier	January 12, 2003	5ABE23	7.02
136	10	"Megalo Dale"	Cyndi Tang-Loveland	J.B. Cook	January 12, 2003	7ABE05	10.84
137	11	"Boxing Luanne"	Mike DiMartino	Dean Young	February 2, 2003	7ABE07	9.55
138	12	"Vision Quest"	Dominic Polcino	Etan Cohen	February 9, 2003	7ABE09	8.25
139	13	"Queasy Rider"	Wes Archer	Kit Boss	February 16, 2003	7ABE10	8.90
140	14	"Board Games"	Kyounghee Lim & Boowhan Lim	Sivert Glarum & Michael Jamin	March 2, 2003	7ABE08	8.84
141	15	"An Officer and a Gentle Boy"	Gary McCarver	Dan Sterling	March 9, 2003	7ABE06	9.72
142	16	"The Miseducation of Bobby Hill"	Tricia Garcia	Tim Croston & Chip Hall	March 16, 2003	7ABE11	7.72
143	17	"The Good Buck"	Allan Jacobsen	Alex Gregory & Peter Huyck	March 30, 2003	7ABE13	7.46
144	18	"I Never Promised You an Organic Garden"	Adam Kuhlman	Tony Gama-Lobo & Rebecca May	April 13, 2003	7ABE14	6.51
145	19	"Be True to Your Fool"	Anthony Lioi	Dan McGrath	April 27, 2003	7ABE12	7.39
146	20	"Racist Dawg"	Mike DiMartino	J.B. Cook	May 4, 2003	7ABE17	7.32
147	21	"Night and Deity"	Gary McCarver	Garland Testa	May 11, 2003	7ABE16	7.68
148	22	"Maid in Arlen"	Kyounghee Lim & Boohwan Lim	Dan Sterling	May 18, 2003	7ABE18	4.84
149	23	"The Witches of East Arlen"	Matt Engstrom	Sivert Glarum & Michael Jamin	May 18, 2003	7ABE20	7.04

=== Season 8 (2003–04) ===
No. overall	No. in season	Title	Directed by	Written by	Original release date	Prod. code	U.S. viewers (millions)
150	1	"Patch Boomhauer"	Anthony Lioi	J.B. Cook	November 2, 2003	8ABE01	12.28
151	2	"Reborn to Be Wild"	Dominic Polcino	Tony Gama-Lobo & Rebecca May	November 9, 2003	8ABE02	7.41
152	3	"New Cowboy on the Block"	Cyndi Tang-Loveland	Dean Young	November 16, 2003	7ABE15	8.92
153	4	"The Incredible Hank"	Wes Archer	Dan Sterling	November 23, 2003	8ABE04	7.39
154	5	"Flirting with the Master"	Anthony Lioi	Norm Hiscock	November 30, 2003	7ABE22	6.97
155	6	"After the Mold Rush"	Dominic Polcino	Kit Boss	December 7, 2003	7ABE19	6.10
156	7	"Livin' on Reds, Vitamin C and Propane"	John Rice	Dan McGrath	December 14, 2003	8ABE05	7.94
157	8	"Rich Hank, Poor Hank"	Tricia Garcia	Etan Cohen	January 4, 2004	7ABE21	7.52
158	9	"Ceci N'Est Pas Une King of the Hill"	Tricia Garcia	Etan Cohen	January 25, 2004	8ABE03	6.50
159	10	"That's What She Said"	Cyndi Tang-Loveland	Sivert Glarum & Michael Jamin	February 8, 2004	8ABE06	5.57
160	11	"My Hair Lady"	Allan Jacobsen	Wyatt Cenac	February 15, 2004	8ABE09	4.84
161	12	"Phish and Wildlife"	Matt Engstrom	Greg Cohen	February 22, 2004	8ABE10	6.43
162	13	"Cheer Factor"	Kyounghee Lim & Boohwan Lim	Christy Stratton	March 7, 2004	8ABE07	5.65
163	14	"Dale Be Not Proud"	Anthony Lioi	Jonathan Collier	March 14, 2004	8ABE11	5.92
164	15	"Après Hank, le Deluge"	Gary McCarver	Kit Boss	March 21, 2004	8ABE08	6.95
165	16	"Daletech"	Dominic Polcino	J.B. Cook	March 28, 2004	8ABE12	6.29
166	17	"How I Learned to Stop Worrying and Love the Alamo"	Brian Sheesley	Christy Stratton	April 18, 2004	8ABE14	6.36
167	18	"Girl, You'll Be a Giant Soon"	Cyndi Tang-Loveland	Dan McGrath	April 25, 2004	8ABE16	6.14
168	19	"Stressed for Success"	Tricia Garcia	Tony Gama-Lobo & Rebecca May	May 2, 2004	8ABE13	6.30
169	20	"Hank's Back" "The Unbearable Lightness of Being Hank"	Robin Brigstocke	Aron Abrams & Gregory Thompson	May 9, 2004	8ABE15	4.50
170	21	"The Redneck on Rainey Street"	Gary McCarver	Jim Dauterive	May 16, 2004	8ABE17	5.13
171	22	"Talking Shop"	Anthony Lioi	Garland Testa	May 23, 2004	8ABE20	6.14

=== Season 9 (2004–05) ===
No. overall	No. in season	Title	Directed by	Written by	Original release date	Prod. code	U.S. viewers (millions)
172	1	"A Rover Runs Through It"	Tricia Garcia	Dan Sterling	November 7, 2004	8ABE22	6.84
173	2	"Ms. Wakefield"	Allan Jacobsen	J.B. Cook	December 19, 2004	9ABE05	4.46
174	3	"Death Buys a Timeshare"	Kyounghee Lim & Boohwan Lim	Etan Cohen	January 16, 2005	8ABE18	4.38
175	4	"Yard, She Blows!"	Allan Jacobsen	Sivert Glarum & Michael Jamin	January 23, 2005	8ABE19	5.24
176	5	"Dale to the Chief"	Anthony Lioi	Garland Testa	January 30, 2005	9ABE02	5.21
177	6	"The Petriot Act"	Robin Brigstocke	Christy Stratton	February 13, 2005	9ABE06	4.69
178	7	"Enrique-cilable Differences"	Dominic Polcino	Greg Cohen	February 20, 2005	9ABE12	6.06
179	8	"Mutual of Omabwah"	Dominic Polcino	Tony Gama-Lobo & Rebecca May	March 6, 2005	9ABE03	4.48
180	9	"Care-Takin' Care of Business"	Cyndi Tang-Loveland	Dan McGrath	March 13, 2005	9ABE01	5.42
181	10	"Arlen City Bomber"	Kyounghee Lim	Jonathan Collier	March 27, 2005	9ABE07	3.77
182	11	"Redcorn Gambles with His Future"	Matt Engstrom	Etan Cohen	April 10, 2005	9ABE09	3.87
183	12	"Smoking and the Bandit"	Cyndi Tang-Loveland	Dan McGrath	April 17, 2005	9ABE10	4.21
184	13	"Gone with the Windstorm"	Yvette Kaplan	Wyatt Cenac	May 1, 2005	9ABE08	5.71
185	14	"Bobby on Track"	Tricia Garcia	Aron Abrams & Gregory Thompson	May 8, 2005	9ABE13	4.85
186	15	"It Ain't Over 'til the Fat Neighbor Sings"	Julius Wu	Etan Cohen	May 15, 2005	9ABE19	4.51

=== Season 10 (2005–06) ===
No. overall	No. in season	Title	Directed by	Written by	Original release date	Prod. code	U.S. viewers (millions)
187	1	"Hank's on Board"	Allan Jacobsen	Sivert Glarum & Michael Jamin	September 18, 2005	9ABE14	7.15
188	2	"Bystand Me"	Dominic Polcino	Kit Boss	September 25, 2005	8ABE21	5.65
189	3	"Bill's House"	Robin Brigstocke	Tony Gama-Lobo & Rebecca May	November 6, 2005	9ABE15	7.70
190	4	"Harlottown"	Tricia Garcia	Aron Abrams & Gregory Thompson	November 20, 2005	9ABE04	6.62
191	5	"Portrait of the Artist as a Young Clown"	Kyounghee Lim	Christy Stratton	December 4, 2005	9ABE16	6.62
192	6	"Orange You Sad I Did Say Banana?"	Adam Kuhlman	Dan Sterling	December 11, 2005	9ABE11	7.04
193	7	"You Gotta Believe (in Moderation)"	Yvette Kaplan	Kit Boss	January 29, 2006	9ABE17	5.06
194	8	"Business Is Picking Up"	Matt Engstrom	Dan Sterling	March 19, 2006	9ABE18	5.77
195	9	"The Year of Washing Dangerously"	Cyndi Tang-Loveland & Ken Wong	J.B. Cook	March 26, 2006	9ABE20	5.13
196	10	"Hank Fixes Everything"	Dominic Polcino & Ronald Rubio	Kit Boss	April 2, 2006	9ABE21	4.45
197	11	"Church Hopping"	Robin Brigstocke	Jim Dauterive	April 9, 2006	9ABE22	4.47
198	12	"24 Hour Propane People"	Robin Brigstocke	Aron Abrams & Gregory Thompson	April 23, 2006	AABE01	3.66
199	13	"The Texas Panhandler"	Ronald Rubio & Ken Wong	Tony Gama-Lobo & Rebecca May	April 30, 2006	AABE02	5.70
200	14	"Hank's Bully"	Kyounghee Lim	J.B. Cook	May 7, 2006	AABE03	4.99
201	15	"Edu-macating Lucky"	Adam Kuhlman	Sivert Glarum & Michael Jamin	May 14, 2006	AABE04	5.15

=== Season 11 (2007) ===
No. overall	No. in season	Title	Directed by	Written by	Original release date	Prod. code	U.S. viewers (millions)
202	1	"The Peggy Horror Picture Show"	Kyounghee Lim	Christy Stratton	January 28, 2007	BABE02	7.27
203	2	"SerPUNt"	Robin Brigstocke	Greg Cohen	February 11, 2007	BABE01	6.99
204	3	"Blood and Sauce"	Tricia Garcia	Dan McGrath	February 18, 2007	BABE03	7.19
205	4	"Luanne Gets Lucky"	Ken Wong	Jonathan Collier	March 25, 2007	BABE04	6.08
206	5	"Hank Gets Dusted"	Michael Loya	Kit Boss	April 1, 2007	BABE05	6.39
207	6	"Glen Peggy Glen Ross"	Tony Kluck	Jim Dauterive	April 22, 2007	BABE06	3.34
208	7	"The Passion of Dauterive"	Anthony Chun	Tony Gama-Lobo & Rebecca May	April 29, 2007	BABE07	3.51
209	8	"Grand Theft Arlen"	Ronald Rubio	Sanjay Shah	April 29, 2007	BABE08	4.14
210	9	"Peggy's Gone to Pots"	Robin Brigstocke	Paul Corrigan & Brad Walsh	May 6, 2007	BABE09	4.19
211	10	"Hair Today, Gone Tomorrow"	Kyounghee Lim	Christy Stratton	May 13, 2007	BABE10	3.68
212	11	"Bill, Bulk and the Body Buddies"	Tricia Garcia	Blake McCormick	May 20, 2007	BABE11	4.05
213	12	"Lucky's Wedding Suit"	Julius Wu	Jim Dauterive	May 20, 2007	AABE05	5.22

=== Season 12 (2007–08) ===
No. overall	No. in season	Title	Directed by	Written by	Original release date	Prod. code	U.S. viewers (millions)
214	1	"Suite Smells of Excess"	Michael Loya	Dave Schiff	September 23, 2007	BABE13	7.82
215	2	"Bobby Rae"	Ken Wong	Tim Croston & Chip Hall	September 30, 2007	BABE12	7.27
216	3	"The Powder Puff Boys"	Ronald Rubio	Christy Stratton	October 7, 2007	BABE16	6.22
217	4	"Four Wave Intersection"	Anthony Chun	Judah Miller & Murray Miller	October 14, 2007	BABE15	7.53
218	5	"Death Picks Cotton"	Tony Kluck	Judah Miller & Murray Miller	November 11, 2007	BABE14	7.60
219	6	"Raise the Steaks"	Robin Brigstocke	Paul Corrigan & Brad Walsh	November 18, 2007	BABE17	9.23
220	7	"Tears of an Inflatable Clown"	Tricia Garcia	Erin Ehrlich	November 25, 2007	BABE19	3.99
221	8	"The Minh Who Knew Too Much"	Kyounghee Lim	Dan McGrath	December 9, 2007	BABE18	6.58
222	9	"Dream Weaver"	Ken Wong	Jennifer Barrow	December 16, 2007	BABE20	7.76
223	10	"Doggone Crazy"	Michael Loya	Dave Schiff	January 6, 2008	CABE01	6.94
224	11	"Trans-Fascism"	Kyounghee Lim	Paul Corrigan & Brad Walsh	February 10, 2008	CABE02	6.06
225	12	"Untitled Blake McCormick Project"	Ken Wong	Blake McCormick	February 17, 2008	CABE03	6.45
226	13	"The Accidental Terrorist"	Robin Brigstocke	Tim Croston & Chip Hall	March 2, 2008	CABE04	7.75
227	14	"Lady and Gentrification"	Anthony Chun	Judah Miller & Murray Miller	March 9, 2008	CABE05	6.25
228	15	"Behind Closed Doors"	Tony Kluck	Christy Stratton	March 16, 2008	CABE06	6.03
229	16	"Pour Some Sugar on Kahn"	Tricia Garcia	Sanjay Shah	March 30, 2008	CABE07	6.07
230	17	"Six Characters in Search of a House"	Ron Rubio	Erin Ehrlich	April 6, 2008	CABE08	5.28
231	18	"The Courtship of Joseph's Father"	Michael Loya	Tony Gama-Lobo & Rebecca May	April 13, 2008	CABE09	6.07
232	19	"Strangeness on a Train"	Kyounghee Lim	Jim Dauterive	April 27, 2008	CABE10	6.53
233	20	"Cops and Robert"	Ken Wong	Dave Schiff	May 4, 2008	CABE11	5.71
234	21	"It Came from the Garage"	Robin Brigstocke	Blake McCormick	May 11, 2008	CABE12	5.04
235	22	"Life: A Loser's Manual"	Anthony Chun	Dan McGrath	May 18, 2008	CABE13	5.40

=== Season 13 (2008–10) ===
No. overall	No. in season	Title	Directed by	Written by	Original release date	Prod. code	U.S. viewers (millions)
236	1	"Dia-BILL-ic Shock"	Ronald Rubio	Sanjay Shah	September 28, 2008	CABE16	7.10
237	2	"Earthy Girls Are Easy"	Matt Engstrom	Paul Corrigan & Brad Walsh	October 5, 2008	CABE17	6.59
238	3	"Square-Footed Monster"	Kyounghee Lim	Jerry Collins	October 19, 2008	CABE18	7.41
239	4	"Lost in MySpace"	Tony Kluck	Judah Miller & Murray Miller	November 2, 2008	CABE14	8.50
240	5	"No Bobby Left Behind"	Tricia Garcia	Tim Croston & Chip Hall	November 9, 2008	CABE15	6.79
241	6	"A Bill Full of Dollars"	Steve Robertson	Dan McGrath	November 16, 2008	CABE19	7.08
242	7	"Straight as an Arrow"	Robin Brigstocke	Tony Gama-Lobo & Rebecca May	November 30, 2008	CABE20	6.33
243	8	"Lucky See, Monkey Do"	Kyounghee Lim	Paul Corrigan & Brad Walsh	February 8, 2009	DABE01	4.75
244	9	"What Happens at the National Propane Gas Convention in Memphis Stays at the National Propane Gas Convention in Memphis"	Ronald Rubio	Jim Dauterive	February 15, 2009	DABE02	5.41
245	10	"Master of Puppets"	Tony Kluck	Blake McCormick	March 1, 2009	DABE03	5.74
246	11	"Bwah My Nose"	Jeff Myers	Judah Miller & Murray Miller	March 8, 2009	DABE04	4.95
247	12	"Uncool Customer"	Tricia Garcia	Christy Stratton	March 15, 2009	DABE05	5.48
248	13	"Nancy Does Dallas"	Michael Loya	Tony Gama-Lobo & Rebecca May	March 22, 2009	DABE06	5.51
249	14	"Born Again on the Fourth of July"	Ken Wong	Erin Ehrlich	April 19, 2009	DABE07	3.39
250	15	"Serves Me Right for Giving General George S. Patton the Bathroom Key"	Steve Robertson	Tim Croston & Chip Hall	April 26, 2009	DABE08	2.89
251	16	"Bad News Bill"	Ronald Rubio	Dave Schiff	May 3, 2009	DABE10	5.14
252	17	"Manger Baby Einstein"	Kyounghee Lim	Sanjay Shah	May 10, 2009	DABE09	4.17
253	18	"Uh-oh, Canada"	Tony Kluck	Jerry Collins	May 17, 2009	DABE11	5.22
254	19	"The Boy Can't Help It"	Jeff Myers	Dan McGrath	September 13, 2009	DABE12	6.26
255	20	"The Honeymooners"	Tricia Garcia	Paul Corrigan & Brad Walsh	May 3, 2010	DABE13	N/A
256	21	"Bill Gathers Moss"	Michael Loya	Aron Abrams & Gregory Thompson	May 4, 2010	DABE14	N/A
257	22	"When Joseph Met Lori, and Made Out with Her in the Janitor's Closet"	Ken Wong	Sanjay Shah	May 5, 2010	DABE15	N/A
258	23	"Just Another Manic Kahn-Day"	Jack Perkins & Steve Robertson	Jennifer Barrow	May 6, 2010	DABE16	N/A
259	24	"To Sirloin with Love"	Kyounghee Lim	Jim Dauterive; Tony Gama-Lobo & Rebecca May; Christy Stratton	September 13, 2009	DABE17	6.04

=== Season 14 (2025) ===
No. overall	No. in season	Title	Directed by	Written by	Original release date	Prod. code
260	1	"Return of the King"	Kelly Turnbull	Mike Judge & Greg Daniels & Saladin K. Patterson	August 4, 2025	EABE01
261	2	"The Beer Story"	Mollie Helms	Norm Hiscock	August 4, 2025	EABE02
262	3	"Bobby Gets Grilled"	Allan Jacobsen	Norm Hiscock & Anthony Del Broccolo	August 4, 2025	EABE07
263	4	"Chore Money, Chore Problems"	Kyounghee Lim	Sam Fishell	August 4, 2025	EABE03
264	5	"New Ref in Town"	Michael Baylis	Anthony Del Broccolo	August 4, 2025	EABE04
265	6	"Peggy's Fadeout"	Kelly Turnbull	Jeremy Hsu	August 4, 2025	EABE05
266	7	"Any Given Hill-Day"	Mollie Helms & Annie Li	Erica Rosbe	August 4, 2025	EABE06
267	8	"Kahn-scious Uncoupling"	Kyounghee Lim	Jeremy Hsu	August 4, 2025	EABE09
268	9	"No Hank Left Behind"	Samantha Arnett	Stephanie M. Johnson	August 4, 2025	EABE08
269	10	"A Sounder Investment"	Michael Baylis	Marcelina Chavira	August 4, 2025	EABE10

=== Season 15 (2026) ===
No. overall	No. in season	Title	Directed by	Written by	Original release date	Prod. code
270	1	"Failure to Hard Launch"	Kyounghee Lim	Erica Rosbe	July 20, 2026	FABE03
271	2	"Care of the Dog"	Kelly Turnbull	Sam Fishell	July 20, 2026	FABE01
272	3	"Searching for Bobby Phisher"	Annie Li	Jeremy Hsu	July 20, 2026	FABE02
273	4	"Hank Encounters of the Nerd Kind"	Michael Baylis	Stephanie M. Johnson	July 20, 2026	FABE04
274	5	"The Best Little Marriage in Texas"	Allan Jacobsen	Bob Daily	July 20, 2026	FABE05
275	6	"Ch-Ch-Ch-Changes"	Samantha Arnett	Anthony Del Broccolo	July 20, 2026	FABE06
276	7	"Hank Ruffles Some Feathers"	Annie Li	Laura Cebula	July 20, 2026	FABE08
277	8	"No-Cuddle Offense"	Kyounghee Lim	Sam Fishell & Jeremy Hsu	July 20, 2026	FABE09
278	9	"Reality Bites"	Michael Baylis	Tahir Bell	July 20, 2026	FABE10
279	10	"Propane Recall"	Kelly Turnbull	Norm Hiscock	July 20, 2026	FABE07

== Upcoming episodes without a scheduled release date ==
Title	Directed by	Written by	Prod. code
"My Grill Wants to Party All the Time"	TBA	Anthony Del Broccolo	GABE01
