= King of the Hill season 1 =

Season of television series

King of the Hill
- Season 1
- DVD cover
- Showrunners: Mike Judge; Greg Daniels
- Starring: Mike Judge; Kathy Najimy; Pamela Adlon; Brittany Murphy; Johnny Hardwick
- No. of episodes: 12

Release
- Original network: Fox
- Original release: January 12 – May 11, 1997

Season chronology
- Next → Season 2

This is a list of episodes from the first season of King of the Hill, which aired on Fox from January 12 to May 11, 1997 for 12 episodes.

== Production ==
The showrunners for the season were Mike Judge and Greg Daniels. New episodes of Judge's first animated series Beavis and Butt-Head continued to air on MTV when the first and second seasons of King of the Hill were airing on Fox, with the series eventually wrapping up in November 1997. A Beavis and Butt-Head spin-off titled Daria also premiered on MTV in March 1997, although Judge had no creative involvement with this series, and didn't voice any of the characters like in Beavis and Butt-Head.

The opening sequence utilized digital ink and paint, however, the episodes themselves were still done using traditional cel animation, and they would continue to be animated this way up until the eight season.

=== Music ===
Work on the show's background music began in January 1997, the same month that it commenced airing. The show's production company, Judgmental Films, hired seven composers to write the music to the first 13 episodes. Among the seven composers were the band The Refreshments, who also composed the opening and closing themes that appear in every episode. The producers gave each composer one or two episodes to do whilst they were looking for the style that would best suit the program, eventually settling on John O'Connor and Roger Neill. Ron Wasserman, who composed the theme songs for Fox's Mighty Morphin Power Rangers and X-Men: The Animated Series, was interested in composing for the show and submitted acoustic guitar music during pre-production, although he would not end up being chosen as one of the initial seven composers on the first season. For the first season and beyond, the show's background music would typically be done three weeks before episodes went to air.

== Broadcast history ==
The season originally aired Sundays at 8:30–9:00 p.m. (EST) on the Fox Broadcasting Company. It aired following The Simpsons, another adult animated series. King of the Hill's strong ratings helped The Simpsons post its first increase over previous season ratings. To coincide with Fox's broadcast of Super Bowl XXXI, a 20 second skit titled "Super Bowl Moment with Hank Hill" aired on January 26, 1997, in which Hank tries to cut in line at a supermarket checkout on the day of the Super Bowl. This skit utilized digital ink and paint like the opening sequence did, and was later included on the DVD release of the first season.

On August 1, 1997, King of the Hill's first season premiered on Channel 4 in the United Kingdom. In Australia, the season began running on the free-to-air Seven Network on November 23, 1997, and was also aired on pay channel Fox8 the following year. Between 1998 and 2010, the rest of the series would continue to be aired concurrently on both Seven and Fox8 in Australia. On the Seven Network, the series was initially airing during prime time, although during the 2000s it typically aired during weekend afternoon timeslots, alongside children's programs. In 1998, a French-Canadian dub of this season began airing in Quebec. This dub removed the Texas references and set the show in rural Quebec, changing the names of all characters and locations. It continued up until the eighth season.

== Reception ==
In December 1997, Entertainment Weekly critic Ken Tucker named King of the Hill as one of the best shows to debut that year. He wrote, "it was a good year for new cartoons, but I'll take King of the Hill bracing openheartedness over South Park's clever but monotonous heartlessness any time. TV’s most original, complicated new character was Hank Hill—middle-class Texan, political conservative, social libertarian, Willie Nelson fan—who exploded every white-guy small-screen stereotype in place since Archie Bunker."

In his 1997 review for the Pilot episode, Howard Rosenberg of the Los Angeles Times wrote, "whereas The Simpsons sees animation as an opportunity to expand physical reality and tour plot realms far beyond the resources of regular sitcoms, King of the Hill is visually myopic in its storytelling." Rosenberg also wrote that King of the Hill lacked "the panoramic vision and often slashing irreverence and social observances of The Simpsons, which, although not the hilarious achiever it once was, remains a cleverly written farce and commentary on pop culture. On Sunday, for example, hapless Homer's eyewitness reports of an eerily glowing, ghostly figure in the night bring Dana Scully and Fox Mulder of Fox's own The X-Files to Springfield [in] a series whose points of reference, from sci-fi to goofy TV newscasters, are as topical and eclectic as ever." Rosenberg added that, "despite being more conventionally humanoid and recognizable than the exotic universe of The Simpsons, the premiere of King of the Hill is light on media signposts, limiting itself pretty much to benign mentions of NBC's Seinfeld." A December 1997 article from Time magazine titled "The Best Television of 1997" stated that, "The Simpsons is still the cleverest comedy on TV, and King of the Hill creates a world with far more specificity than any live-action sitcom. Both are smarter, funnier and, in fact, more human than Friends or Seinfeld."

In June 1997, Katy Daigle of the Hartford Courant labelled the show as being an improvement over Mike Judge's other animated series Beavis and Butt-Head, claiming that, "it has substance to its consistently on-target humor." The Capital Gazette described it as "The Simpsons meets Beavis and Butt-head in the Texas burbs" in February 1997. Phil Gallo of Variety commented in his review of the Pilot that, "it's a break from all the over-the-top sitcoms Fox has scheduled in hopes of building off the Married... with Children franchise. Humor here is far more sedate. Plenty of folks won't get it." Gallo added that the animation is "neither as crude as B&B or as sharp as The Simpsons, which Film Roman also produces."

=== Contemporary reception ===
In a 2006 review of the DVD release of the first season, Dorian Lynskey of British publication Empire gave it four out of five stars, commenting that "it seems odd that the Hills were once dismissed as Simpsons copyists. Compared to Springfield's helter-skelter surrealism, Arlen, Texas is doggedly low-key and the animation is as flat as the landscape." Lynskey added "Texan-born (Note: Judge was in fact born in Guayaquil, Ecuador - see Mike Judge.) creator Mike Judge's natural feel for small-town rhythms and ordinary lives makes this the truest and kindest of the post-Groening animated sitcoms." In 2021, Ben Sherlock of Game Rant considered the series to be more original than Fox's later adult animated show Family Guy, which premiered in 1999. He wrote "King of the Hill and Family Guy are both adult-oriented animated comedies capitalizing on The Simpsons success, but only one is called a rip-off."

== Cast and characters ==
=== Main cast ===
- Mike Judge as Hank Hill / Boomhauer / Stuart Dooley (voice)
- Kathy Najimy as Peggy Hill (voice)
- Pamela Adlon as Bobby Hill / Clark Peters (voice)
- Brittany Murphy as Luanne Platter / Joseph Gribble (voice)
- Johnny Hardwick as Dale Gribble (voice)

=== Recurring ===
- Stephen Root as Bill Dauterive / Buck Strickland (voice)
- Toby Huss as Cotton Hill / Kahn Souphanousinphone, Sr. / Joe Jack / Additional voices (voice)

=== Guest stars ===
- Willie Nelson as Himself (voice)
- Dennis Hopper as Himself (voice)
- Chuck Mangione as Himself (voice)
- Laurie Metcalf as Cissy Cobb (voice)
- Jennifer Coolidge as Miss Kremzer (voice)

== Episodes ==
No. overall	No. in season	Title	Directed by	Written by	Original release date	Prod. code	U.S. viewers (millions)
1	1	"Pilot"	Wes Archer	Mike Judge & Greg Daniels	January 12, 1997	4E01	19.92
Strickland propane salesman and family man, Hank Hill, is accused of beating his son, Bobby, after Bobby gets a black eye from getting hit in the face with a baseball during a Little League game and rumors spread that Hank beat up a teenaged Megalo-Mart employee (when really he just yelled at him for not knowing if the store sells a tap and die and some WD-40). Meanwhile, Hank's friends, conspiracy nut Dale Gribble, down-and-out Army barber Bill Dauterive, and fast-talking womanizer Jeff Boomhauer, try to fix Hank's truck, while Luanne Platter (Hank's niece) moves in with the Hills after her parents get sent to jail over a domestic disturbance. The episode is also known as "Bobby the Baseball Phenom".
2	2	"Square Peg"	Gary McCarver	Joe Stillman	January 19, 1997	4E02	14.32
Peggy is mortified and tongue-tied when she finds out she has been chosen to teach the middle school's sexual education class, while Hank does everything he can to keep his son from learning about sex.
3	3	"The Order of the Straight Arrow"	Klay Hall	Cheryl Holliday	February 2, 1997	4E03	18.93
Hank, Bill, Dale, and Boomhauer take Bobby and his friends on an Order of the Straight Arrow camping trip where the men send the boys on a snipe hunt during which Bobby stuns a whooping crane but then everyone believes it is dead. Meanwhile, Peggy sneaks out to buy special shoes for her large feet. Note: This episode was dedicated to Victor Aaron, the original voice of John Redcorn.
4	4	"Hank's Got the Willies"	Monte Young	Johnny Hardwick	February 9, 1997	4E05	15.30
Hank is worried that Bobby does not have a normal role model in his life—and things get worse when Bobby accidentally hits Hank's idol, Willie Nelson (voiced by Nelson himself) with a golf club during a day on the green. Willie later explains to Hank that Bobby already had a hero all along...his father.
5	5	"Luanne's Saga"	Pat Shinagawa	Paul Lieberstein	February 16, 1997	4E04	17.49
When Buckley breaks up with Luanne and she goes on a days-long crying jag, Hank sets out to find Luanne a new boyfriend in 48 hours—which backfires when Hank sees Luanne with Boomhauer. Chuck Mangione also guest stars. Last appearance of Victor Aaron as John Redcorn.
6	6	"Hank's Unmentionable Problem"	Adam Kuhlman	Greg Daniels & Mike Judge	February 23, 1997	4E07	15.05
Hank's ongoing constipation causes great concern for Peggy and, much to Hank's embarrassment, everyone else in Arlen. Jim Cummings and Steven Banks guest stars.
7	7	"Westie Side Story"	Brian Sheesley	Jonathan Aibel & Glenn Berger	March 2, 1997	4E06	16.25
When a new Laotian family moves in next door, problems ensue when the new neighbor's family dog goes missing and the Hills fear that the stereotype about Asians eating dogs is true.
8	8	"Shins of the Father"	Martin Archer Jr.	Alan R. Cohen & Alan Freedland	March 23, 1997	4E08	15.89
Hank's brash, sexist, war veteran father, Cotton Hill, crashes Bobby's 12th birthday party and uses it as an excuse to stay over at the Hills' house, which does not sit well with Peggy when Cotton's misogyny begins rubbing off on Bobby.
9	9	"Peggy the Boggle Champ"	Chuck Sheetz	Jonathan Aibel & Glenn Berger	April 13, 1997	4E09	15.42
Hank's promise to coach Peggy at the Texas State Boggle Championship is jeopardized when his buddies try to lure him away to the Ninth Annual Dallas Mower Expo. Meanwhile, Bobby and Luanne freak out when they leave a condensation ring on the new coffee table, but their efforts to fix it cause even more trouble.
10	10	"Keeping Up with Our Joneses"	John Rice	Jonathan Collier & Joe Stillman	April 27, 1997	4E10	17.37
When Hank catches Bobby smoking a cigarette in a gas station bathroom, Hank punishes him by making his son smoke an entire carton, but the plan backfires when Bobby, Hank, and Peggy all become addicted.
11	11	"King of the Ant Hill"	Gary McCarver	Johnny Hardwick & Paul Lieberstein	May 4, 1997	4E13	12.64
After telling Dale never to spray insecticide on his lawn again, Hank's expensive new lawn becomes mysteriously infested with fire ants days before Rainey Street's Cinco de Mayo celebration. Meanwhile, Bobby becomes the hypnotized servant for the Red Ant Queen.
12	12	"Plastic White Female"	Jeff Myers	David Zuckerman	May 11, 1997	4E11	13.25
Bobby is invited to his first boy/girl party, and Peggy is horrified when she discovers him kissing Luanne's plastic beauty school head.

== Home media ==
The season was released on DVD in Region 1 (North America) by 20th Century Fox Home Entertainment in 2003. In 2006, it was released in Region 2 (Australia) by 20th Century Fox Home Entertainment South Pacific, and it was also released In Region 4 (the United Kingdom) that year as well. It is the only season of the show that Fox released on DVD in Japan, with the Japanese release featuring a dubbed version. The second season was also dubbed, and aired on Japanese television, but was never released on DVD in the country. The original 2003 DVD release for Region 1 included three DVD cases in a cardboard box. The Region 2 and Region 4 releases instead held all the season's discs in a single case. In 2010, the Region 1 DVD was reissued with similar packaging to the other regions.

The season two episode "The Company Man" is included on DVD releases due to its production code. On Hulu and most television reruns, this episode is still ordered as part of the second season.
