= King of the Hill season 3 =

King of the Hill
- Season 3
- DVD cover
- Showrunners: Greg Daniels; Richard Appel
- Starring: Mike Judge; Kathy Najimy; Pamela Adlon; Brittany Murphy; Johnny Hardwick; Toby Huss
- No. of episodes: 25

Release
- Original network: Fox
- Original release: September 15, 1998 – May 18, 1999

Season chronology
- ← Previous; Season 2 Next → Season 4

The following is a list of episodes from the third season of King of the Hill, which originally aired on Fox from September 20, 1998 to May 16, 1999 for 25 episodes. The season's premiere was preceded by a sneak preview on Fox during August 23, 1998. The Region 1 DVD was released on December 28, 2004. The Region 2 and 4 DVDs were respectively released on August 28 and September 26, 2006.

== Production ==
The showrunners for the season were Greg Daniels and Richard Appel. This was the first season where Appel was a showrunner, with the first two seasons having been jointly run by Daniels and Mike Judge (who in 1998 was busy directing the film Office Space). Like Daniels, Appel had previously written for The Simpsons. He left that show to join King of the Hill in late 1997, although episodes he had worked on for The Simpsons continued to be aired into 1998. Daniels sought to bring Appel to the show not only because of his previous experience working with him on The Simpsons, but also because he was a close friend who he'd been collaborating with since the 1980s, during his days as a writer for The Harvard Lampoon. In a December 1998 Chicago Tribune article, Daniels said, "It was essential that Rich was a good writer who could deal with people, who could help manage the business in the room. But equally important was the fact that he was someone I could trust, who had a similar sense of taste and values." In this same article, Appel reflected, "when I first came here, up on the board, they had exercises, and one was a poll with questions like, 'Did Hank and Peggy have sex before they got married?' Then there'd be a tally of what percentage of the writers thought yes. There were 50 questions like that, and it was really interesting. That first season, they spent days and days thinking of backstory for each character, which they could then draw on over the course of the year. It might be something as small as the fact that Peggy has big feet, and she's ashamed of that. But it helps flavor the characters for the writers, and gives a better sense of what they're like."

The episode "To Spank, with Love" was extensively rewritten after the table read. In the rewritten version, Peggy gets fired after spanking a student in her class; in the original script, the school board instead turned out to be so conservative that they commended Peggy for spanking. After this, there was a montage of Peggy spanking children and she became obsessed with violence.

== Broadcast history ==
King of the Hill was moved to a Tuesday night time slot this season. This led to a decline in ratings, in part due to competition from WB's hit Buffy the Vampire Slayer (which featured Sarah Michelle Gellar, a guest voice for this season). Fox later moved the show back to its original Sunday night time slot.

== Reception ==
In his October 1998 review of the episode "Peggy's Headache", Steve Johnson of the Chicago Tribune wrote, "when it comes to spotting the subtle shadings of human behavior, there is little on TV with so keen an eye as King of the Hill." Johnson added that, "sometimes the characters in cartoons are more human than so-called 'real' actors." Ken Tucker of Entertainment Weekly wrote in April 1999 that, "when King debuted in 1997, it was a pleasant surprise: Who knew Mike Judge, progenitor of Uberlouts Beavis and Butt-Head, had it in him to create such a subtle, detailed portrait of contemporary middle-class life? This season, the show’s only gotten better — deeper, richer, more true to its guiding intention of presenting people with Texas twangs as something other than the media cliche of rubes with bad taste." In his December 2004 review of the DVD release, Colin Jacobson of DVD Movie Guide wrote that, "the year suffered from very few flat episodes and offered a lot of strong ones." Jacobson labelled "Pretty, Pretty Dresses" as "one of the darker episodes [focusing] on the less jolly side of the holidays", noting that "this doesn’t exactly make the show a laugh riot, but it’s an interesting take on the subject, especially as Bill goes more and more nuts."

== Episodes ==
No. overall	No. in season	Title	Directed by	Written by	Original release date	Prod. code	U.S. viewers (millions)
36	1	"Propane Boom II: Death of a Propane Salesman" (Part 2)	Lauren MacMullan	Alan R. Cohen & Alan Freedland	September 15, 1998	5E24	10.92
Conclusion. In the aftermath of the Mega Lo Mart exploding, Hank suffers from propane-related PTSD, Buckley is found dead and laid to rest, Bobby begins to fear death, and Luanne deals with the loss of both Buckley and her hair by becoming a Sinéad O'Connor-esque activist to everyone's chagrin. NOTE: This episode is shown as the season 3 opener, despite having a season 2 production code. It also was supposed to be shown on September 8, 1998, but due to the ongoing pursuit of the single season home run record by Mark McGwire, Fox preempted the episode to show that night's game between McGwire's St. Louis Cardinals and the Chicago Cubs, in which McGwire hit his sixty-second home run of the season to break Roger Maris' then record.
37	2	"And They Call It Bobby Love"	Cyndi Tang	Norm Hiscock	September 22, 1998	3ABE01	7.49
Bobby falls in love with a 14-year-old classmate (Sarah Michelle Gellar), but soon learns that love hurts when the girl confesses that she only wants a platonic friend. Meanwhile, Hank, Dale, Bill, and Boomhauer become attached to a couch that was thrown out in the Hills' yard.
38	3	"Peggy's Headache"	Chris Moeller	Joe Stillman	October 6, 1998	5E20	7.70
Peggy gets hired to write for the Arlen Bystander, but the stress of a new career leads her to require treatment from John Redcorn—and she soon discovers that John Redcorn had an affair with Nancy and is Joseph's biological father. NOTE: This episode featured Luanne with a shaved head and is usually shown in its aired order as a third season episode, despite having a season 2 production code.
39	4	"Pregnant Paws"	Chris Moeller	Jonathan Aibel & Glenn Berger	October 13, 1998	3ABE02	7.75
While Hank is busy trying to breed Ladybird, Dale decides to add a little excitement to his life by enrolling in a four-hour bounty hunter training course. Special guest voice: William H. Macy and Jim Cummings
40	5	"Next of Shin"	Jeff Myers	Alan R. Cohen & Alan Freedland	November 3, 1998	3ABE05	8.24
After Hank learns his sperm count is low, his mood worsens when Cotton shows up, boasting that his new wife, Didi, is pregnant.
41	6	"Peggy's Pageant Fever"	Tricia Garcia	Norm Hiscock	November 10, 1998	3ABE07	9.11
Peggy enters the Mrs. Heimlich County Beauty pageant in hopes of winning a truck, but quickly discovers that she is not fit to compete with the other contestants.
42	7	"Nine Pretty Darn Angry Men"	Shaun Cashman	Jim Dauterive	November 17, 1998	3ABE08	8.23
While shopping at the mall on Black Friday, Hank, Dale, Bill, Kahn, and Boomhauer are invited to be part of a focus group for a new mower (with Cotton as an uninvited guest), Luanne goes ice skating to forget about Buckley, and Peggy falls asleep at a shoe repair shop after tearing her loafer. Guests Billy Bob Thornton, Dwight Yoakam.
43	8	"Good Hill Hunting"	Klay Hall	Joe Stillman	December 1, 1998	3ABE04	9.15
Hank takes Bobby hunting in order to initiate him into the mysteries of manhood. However, everything goes wrong when Hank discovers that it is too late for Bobby to get a hunting license.
44	9	"Pretty, Pretty Dresses"	Dominic Polcino	Paul Lieberstein	December 15, 1998	3ABE10	7.90
In this second Christmas episode, Bill becomes more depressed than usual as it is the anniversary of his wife leaving him. Hank, Dale, and Boomhauer decide to watch Bill in case he threatens to commit suicide, but when Hank yells at him for being a burden, Bill's depression turns into delusion when he begins dressing in drag and impersonating his estranged ex-wife Lenore. Guest Stars: Janet Waldo as Mrs. Tobbis
45	10	"A Firefighting We Will Go"	Cyndi Tang-Loveland	Alan R. Cohen & Alan Freedland	January 12, 1999	3ABE11	9.04
In a Rashomon-meets-The Three Stooges-style story, Hank, Dale, Bill, and Boomhauer tell their own versions of their day as firefighters after getting arrested for burning the firehouse to the ground. Meanwhile, Bobby helps Peggy with a pulled groin muscle. Guest: Barry Corbin as Fire Chief and Buddy Ebsen as Chet Elderson. This was Buddy's final role before he died in 2003.
46	11	"To Spank, with Love"	Adam Kuhlman	David Zuckerman	January 19, 1999	3ABE03	9.27
Peggy gains a reputation as an abusive disciplinarian when she spanks Dooley for humiliating her during class.
47	12	"Three Coaches and a Bobby"	Chris Moeller	Johnny Hardwick	January 26, 1999	3ABE12	8.47
Hank gets his hard-knocks former high-school football coach to take on guidance of Bobby's football team, but the plan falls apart when Bobby joins the soccer team headed by a politically correct coach (Will Ferrell).
48	13	"De-Kahnstructing Henry"	Klay Hall	Paul Lieberstein	February 2, 1999	3ABE14	9.65
Hank accidentally gets Kahn fired after revealing one of Kahn's top-secret plans for his company.
49	14	"The Wedding of Bobby Hill"	Jack Dyer	Jonathan Collier	February 9, 1999	3ABE09	8.05
To teach Bobby and Luanne a lesson in playing pranks, Hank orders Bobby to marry Luanne after Bobby takes her birth control pills and replaces them with sweet tarts. Guest: Matthew McConaughey as Rad Thibodeaux
50	15	"Sleight of Hank"	Jeff Myers	Jonathan Aibel & Glenn Berger	February 16, 1999	3ABE15	8.52
Peggy is chosen to be a magician's assistant at Abracapasta, but angers Hank when she will not tell him the secret behind one of his tricks.
51	16	"Jon Vitti Presents: 'Return to La Grunta'"	Gary McCarver	Jon Vitti	February 23, 1999	3ABE06	7.88
Luanne gets a job as a drink girl at a resort called "La Grunta", where the golfers sexually harass her. Meanwhile, Hank goes to La Grunta to swim with the dolphins—and gets molested by one of them, and is paid off with hotel merchandise to keep from reporting the incident. Guest star: Billy West as one of the golfers
52	17	"Escape from Party Island"	Gary McCarver	Jonathan Collier	March 16, 1999	3ABE16	7.71
Hank reluctantly drives his mother and her friends to Port Aransas to shop for glass miniatures, but things get even worse when Hank and the rude old women have to contend with MTV's raucous spring breakers in order to leave. Guests: Phyllis Diller, Uta Hagen, Pauly Shore and Betty White
53	18	"Love Hurts and So Does Art"	Adam Kuhlman	John Altschuler & Dave Krinsky	March 23, 1999	3ABE13	8.02
An X-ray of Hank's colon from "Hank's Unmentionable Problem" winds up as the main attraction in an art museum. Meanwhile, Bobby is diagnosed with gout after eating chicken livers at a recently opened "New York" style deli.
54	19	"Hank's Cowboy Movie"	Shaun Cashman	Jim Dauterive	April 6, 1999	3ABE18	7.08
Hurt by Bobby's negative views of his hometown, Hank tries to get the Dallas Cowboys to move their training camp from Wichita Falls to Arlen. However, his promotion video for Arlen is ruined by Peggy's and his friends' incompetence.
55	20	"Dog Dale Afternoon"	Tricia Garcia	Jon Vitti	April 13, 1999	3ABE17	8.81
After Dale annoys his friends by gloating over his new mower, he goes insane when they steal it as part of a prank.
56	21	"Revenge of the Lutefisk"	Jack Dyer	Jonathan Aibel & Glenn Berger	April 20, 1999	3ABE19	7.41
Bobby accidentally burns down his church after getting sick from eating lutefisk, but Cotton gets blamed for it due to his sexist attitude towards the church accepting a female pastor (Mary Tyler Moore).
57	22	"Death and Texas"	Wes Archer	John Altschuler & Dave Krinsky	April 27, 1999	3ABE20	7.94
Peggy visits a convict who tricks her into thinking he's a former student who ended up in jail and uses her as a cocaine mule. Meanwhile, Dale tries to apply for a job as a prison executioner.
58	23	"Wings of the Dope"	Cyndi Tang-Loveland	Johnny Hardwick	May 4, 1999	3ABE21	6.76
After seeing the trampoline Kahn bought from Buckley's estate fall into disrepair, Hank and the guys move it to Hank's lawn to fix it. Buckley's Angel appears on it and visits Luanne. He persuades her to do something better with her life than attend beauty school and earns his halo afterward.
59	24	"Take Me Out of the Ball Game"	Chris Moeller	Alan R. Cohen & Alan Freedland	May 11, 1999	3ABE22	7.24
Hank is picked to coach the company's softball team, spurring friction between Peggy and Hank. Meanwhile, Bobby and Connie are forced to define their relationship after being displayed in the "couples" section of the school yearbook.
60	25	"As Old as the Hills..." (Part 1)	Adam Kuhlman	Norm Hiscock	May 18, 1999	3ABE23	7.18
Part one of two. Fearing that they may be getting too old to be "cool", Hank and Peggy spend their anniversary sky-diving, which comes to an abrupt end when Peggy's parachute malfunctions and she crashes onto a field. Meanwhile, Bobby struggles with taking his pregnant step-grandmother Didi to the hospital when her water breaks.

== Home video ==
The Region 1 DVD for the season was released on December 28, 2004, with this release being the first to contain double-sided disks (which would continue through to the sixth season DVD release) and no extras (which would continue for all other DVD releases). The lack of extras was since the show's producers found it difficult to find the time to create worthwhile extras while the show was still on the air. In January 2005, it was reported that they were planning on having special features for future releases, although this never came to fruition. In Region 2 and Region 4, the Season 3 set was released in 2006, and did not utilize double-sided disks.

The episodes are presented in their airdate order rather than in their production order. This slightly disrupts the show's continuity, as Luanne gradually regrew her hair throughout the season following the explosion at Mega-Lo Mart at the end of Season 2.
