= King of the Hill season 8 =

King of the Hill
- Season 8
- DVD cover
- Showrunners: John Altschuler; Dave Krinsky
- Starring: Mike Judge; Kathy Najimy; Pamela Adlon; Brittany Murphy; Johnny Hardwick; Stephen Root; Toby Huss
- No. of episodes: 22

Release
- Original network: Fox
- Original release: November 2, 2003 – May 23, 2004

Season chronology
- ← Previous; Season 7 Next → Season 9

The eighth season of King of the Hill originally aired on Sundays at 7:30–8:00 p.m. (EST) on the Fox Broadcasting Company from November 2, 2003 to May 23, 2004.

== Production ==
The showrunners for the season were John Altschuler and Dave Krinsky. The eighth production season was the first to fully utilize digital ink and paint, although four episodes ("New Cowboy on the Block", "After the Mold Rush", "Flirting with the Master" and "Rich Hank, Poor Hank") were holdover episodes from the Season 7 (7ABE) production line and were still traditionally colored. The last of these produced was "Flirting with the Master", while the last aired was "Rich Hank, Poor Hank".

This season saw Luanne have more of a prominent role again, after several seasons as a minor character due to Brittany Murphy's rising film career. In a 2003 interview with Cinescape, Altschuler commented, "she [Brittany Murphy] came to us and was actually pitching ideas to us about how to get Luanne more involved in the show. She's just truly a great team player who loves the show and does anything we ask her to do. She's how we got Elijah Wood to do the show."

Brad Pitt, guest star on the episode "Patch Boomhauer", first expressed interest in appearing on King of the Hill after his then-wife Jennifer Aniston appeared in the Season 7 episode "Queasy Rider". Pitt was a fan of the series, and pitched the idea that he'd voice Boomhauer's brother. Originally, this character was modeled after Pitt, but the show's animators decided to make the character look closer in appearance to Boomhauer.

== Episodes ==
No. overall	No. in season	Title	Directed by	Written by	Original release date	Prod. code	U.S. viewers (millions)
150	1	"Patch Boomhauer"	Anthony Lioi	J.B. Cook	November 2, 2003	8ABE01	12.28
When Boomhauer's brother (voiced by Brad Pitt) announces he is marrying Boomhauer's old girlfriend (Laura Dern), Hank believes Boomhauer is out to sabotage the wedding.
151	2	"Reborn to Be Wild"	Dominic Polcino	Tony Gama-Lobo & Rebecca May	November 9, 2003	8ABE02	7.41
Fearing that Bobby is succumbing to bad influences, Hank makes him join a local church youth group. Bobby discovers that the group consists of cool punks (guest voiced by the band members of Sum 41), including their tattooed pastor, i.e. "Pastor K", who worship God through skateboarding and rock. Hank approves of Bobby's newfound interest in religion, but disapproves of the way the group treats Christianity as a fad. Meanwhile, Hank's friends (and Kahn) start a club called "The Last Meal Club", where they come up with what meals they would like to eat before they die. Guest Stars: Gene Simmons as Jessie.
152	3	"New Cowboy on the Block"	Cyndi Tang-Loveland	Dean Young	November 16, 2003	7ABE15	8.92
A washed-up former Dallas Cowboys player moves into the neighborhood, and no one, not even Hank, can admit that he is a jerk—until the man starts harassing Hank. Guest Stars: Phil Hendrie as Big Willie Lane and Fred Willard as Officer Brown.
153	4	"The Incredible Hank"	Wes Archer	Dan Sterling	November 23, 2003	8ABE04	7.39
Hank takes Bobby to the doctor to get him some testosterone supplements to boost his energy, but Hank becomes the one who sorely needs a testosterone boost. Afterwards, Bobby faces his fear of showering after gym class.
154	5	"Flirting with the Master"	Anthony Lioi	Norm Hiscock	November 30, 2003	7ABE22	6.97
The actor who plays TV's "Monsignor Martinez" invites Peggy to Mexico City to tutor his children for an English language exam, and Peggy thinks the actor has fallen in love with her. Meanwhile, Luanne takes on Peggy's duties at home.
155	6	"After the Mold Rush"	Dominic Polcino	Kit Boss	December 7, 2003	7ABE19	6.10
When Hank's house sustains minor water damage days before the Arlen Parade of Homes, a man from the insurance company sets out to get rich by determining that the Hill household is infested with mold and shaking them down for money with needless tests and repairs.
156	7	"Livin' on Reds, Vitamin C and Propane"	John Rice	Dan McGrath	December 14, 2003	8ABE05	7.94
Hank needs to take some antique furniture to his mother in Arizona, so he rents an 18-wheeler and takes Bobby on a road trip (with Dale, Bill, and Boomhauer stowing away). Meanwhile, Peggy and Luanne try to write a Christmas novelty song. Trace Adkins, Deana Carter, Brad Paisley, George Strait and Travis Tritt guest star. Because of a long-running NFL game that aired nationwide, only the last 5 minutes of the episode aired in the Eastern and Central time zone. After Fox received a number of complaints, the episode was repeated eight days later.
157	8	"Rich Hank, Poor Hank"	Tricia Garcia	Etan Cohen	January 4, 2004	7ABE21	7.52
Bobby thinks Hank is secretly a rich miser after hearing Peggy talking about Hank's new $1,000 bonus, and Bobby steals Hank's emergency credit card to go on a shopping spree with Connie and Joseph.
158	9	"Ceci N'Est Pas Une King of the Hill"	Tricia Garcia	Etan Cohen	January 25, 2004	8ABE03	6.50
When Hank asks Peggy to design an art piece for Strickland Propane, she creates the "Probot," a statue made out of propane tanks. Her sculpture is rejected by the city board, but picked up by an art dealer from Dallas -- who makes her out to be an uneducated hillbilly. Meanwhile, Dale starts wearing a suit of armor and uses his newfound invincibility to insult people without consequence – until Bill creates his own suit of armor and challenges him to a fight. The episode won an Annie Award for writing.
159	10	"That's What She Said"	Cyndi Tang-Loveland	Sivert Glarum & Michael Jamin	February 8, 2004	8ABE06	5.57
A new employee named Rich (voiced by Ben Stiller) becomes popular around Strickland Propane for telling lewd jokes, but Hank feels uncomfortable about them and the lawyer he talks to advises Hank to sue for sexual harassment (since telling raunchy jokes during work hours counts as harassment). Meanwhile, Dale trades smoking cigarettes for chewing tobacco. Other Guest Stars: Danny Trejo as Enrique
160	11	"My Hair Lady"	Allan Jacobsen	Wyatt Cenac	February 15, 2004	8ABE09	4.84
Luanne and Bill both get jobs at the hippest hair salon in Arlen called "Hottyz." But in order to keep his job, Bill must pretend to be gay. Meanwhile, Hank's elderly barber (Brian Doyle Murray) has a hard time staying in business. Other Guest Stars: Christina Applegate as Collete Davis
161	12	"Phish and Wildlife"	Matt Engstrom	Greg Cohen	February 22, 2004	8ABE10	6.43
Hank takes Bobby (who needs a lesson in self-reliance) and the guys on a fishing trip, where they vow to eat only what they catch, but the trip is ruined by hippies who would rather sponge off the park's resources, and Bobby inadvertently letting the hippies live off Hank.
162	13	"Cheer Factor"	Kyounghee Lim & Boohwan Lim	Christy Stratton	March 7, 2004	8ABE07	5.65
Peggy volunteers to help with the school cheerleading squad by having Bobby as a mascot and participating with the cheerleaders, but soon finds herself facing the school board after her "Fighting Irish" show is deemed offensive. Guest Stars: Peri Gilpin as Jo Rita
163	14	"Dale Be Not Proud"	Anthony Lioi	Jonathan Collier	March 14, 2004	8ABE11	5.92
When NHRA driver John Force needs an organ transplant, Dale is a match and he is the only one who can save him. Hank encourages Dale to ignore his fear of hospitals and give up his kidney to save Force. Dale reluctantly agrees, but only if Hank takes his place being Dale for the day, a task that consists of outlandish duties. Guest Stars: John Force as Himself and Larry Miller as Dr. Tabor
164	15	"Après Hank, le Deluge"	Gary McCarver	Kit Boss	March 21, 2004	8ABE08	6.95
When a flood threatens the town, the Arlenites gather in the communal shelter: the Tom Landry gym. When Hank is forced open the Arlen Dam's floodgates to flood a dozen homes and businesses, lest he risks the dam bursting and flooding the entirety of South Arlen, the crowd does not get the full story and turns on him, led by Bill, who uses the people's panic to make himself feel important. Meantime, the kids go wild in the yearbook office, Peggy begins acting childish, and Dale schemes to build an ark to float his family to safety.
165	16	"Daletech"	Dominic Polcino	J.B. Cook	March 28, 2004	8ABE12	6.29
Dale starts a security company called "Daletech", but his business is threatened by Cotton, who has become a new local auxiliary police officer. Dale plots to make Cotton look bad by having him terrorize the neighbors and make them turn on him. Meanwhile, Hank tries to solve the mystery of who's been in his house while everyone else is out.
166	17	"How I Learned to Stop Worrying and Love the Alamo"	Brian Sheesley	Christy Stratton	April 18, 2004	8ABE14	6.36
Hank tries to teach Bobby about the Alamo after discovering that the new history textbooks in school only contain pop history including a chapter focusing on the Tejano queen Selena — and things get worse when Hank's plans for a play about the Battle of the Alamo include the director Bruce Tuttle, who is a historical negationist who wants to portray the American forces as a bunch of drunken, doped-up, slave-owning, prostitute-loving cowards. Meanwhile, Nancy gets a Flat Stanley doll in the mail, and Peggy and Luanne put it through dangerous scenarios to teach kids about safety.
167	18	"Girl, You'll Be a Giant Soon"	Cyndi Tang-Loveland	Dan McGrath	April 25, 2004	8ABE16	6.14
Luanne tries to help Hank protest against a grilling contest when it is revealed that the contest does not allow propane grills. Meanwhile, Peggy, Nancy, and Minh try to visit a house where a famous murder took place, but the real estate agent is only letting in potential buyers. Guest Stars: Dax Shepard as Zack, Mary Kay Place as Melly-Anne and Elijah Wood as Jason
168	19	"Stressed for Success"	Tricia Garcia	Tony Gama-Lobo & Rebecca May	May 2, 2004	8ABE13	6.30
Bobby joins the school's Quiz Bowl team because of his extensive knowledge of pop culture, but he becomes stressed out by the pressure. Guest Stars: Kelly Clarkson as Herself, John Ritter as Eugene Grandy and Ben Stein as Quizmaster Note: This episode is dedicated to John Ritter.
169	20	"Hank's Back" "The Unbearable Lightness of Being Hank"	Robin Brigstocke	Aron Abrams & Gregory Thompson	May 9, 2004	8ABE15	4.50
When Hank suffers a back injury at work and none of his doctors can fix it, he tries the healing powers of yoga. At first, he finds it a little too wacky, but thanks to the help of Yogi Victor (voiced by Johnny Depp), he realizes that it actually works. However, Hank's insurance company uses this to prove that Hank is taking unfair advantage of his workers' compensation. Meanwhile, Peggy fights to keep the old Pink & White market open by returning to her old job as a bagger. Guest stars: Angela Bloomfield, Johnny Depp as Yogi Victor, and Marg Helgenberger as the claims adjuster
170	21	"The Redneck on Rainey Street"	Gary McCarver	Jim Dauterive	May 16, 2004	8ABE17	5.13
After Connie is turned down for a college prep summer program and they realize that their hard work and overachieving has gotten them nowhere in life, Kahn and Minh decide to give up and live like beer-drinking, El Camino-driving rednecks, which nearly drive them to homelessness when they stop making payments on their house. Trace Adkins, Elizabeth Perkins, and Tom Petty guest star. This would mark Petty's first appearance as Lucky Kleinschmidt, who would have a recurring role in later seasons as Luanne Platter's boyfriend and later husband.
171	22	"Talking Shop"	Anthony Lioi	Garland Testa	May 23, 2004	8ABE20	6.14
Despite Hank's wishes for Bobby to take auto shop, Bobby takes peer counseling so he can give advice to vulnerable teenage girls. Meanwhile, Hank finds a wrecked car for Bobby to fix, thinking that he signed up for auto shop. Guest stars: Alyson Hannigan as Stacy Gibson, Lindsay Lohan as Jenny Medina, and Laura Prepon as April.
