= King of the Hill season 2 =

King of the Hill
- Season 2
- DVD cover
- Showrunners: Mike Judge; Greg Daniels
- Starring: Mike Judge; Kathy Najimy; Pamela Adlon; Brittany Murphy; Johnny Hardwick
- No. of episodes: 23

Release
- Original network: Fox
- Original release: September 21, 1997 – May 17, 1998

Season chronology
- ← Previous; Season 1 Next → Season 3

This is a list of episodes from the second season of King of the Hill, which aired on Fox from September 21, 1997 to May 17, 1998 for 23 episodes. Season 2 also saw the show net its highest ever Nielsen ranking at #15, and except for their broadcast of Super Bowl XXXI in 1997, it was the highest Nielsen rating for any Fox show up to that point, even beating The Simpsons at times.

== Production ==
The showrunners for the season was Mike Judge and Greg Daniels. Wes Archer, the supervising director, did a redesign on most of the characters to make them appear more realistic than they did in the first season. In his 2003 DVD commentary for the episode "How to Fire a Rifle Without Really Trying", Daniels reflected, "in season two, because of the way animation works, there was a big overlap. The episodes from season one were coming back and requiring producing and music and editing while we were writing season two. So, during the first season we had a very pure experience of just writing them without any distractions, and in the second season it suddenly got a lot harder because you'd be trying to write, and something would come in requiring attention." Daniels added that, "this was part of the time I kept having a lot of car accidents, because we were so tired." Early in the production of the season, Pamela Adlon couldn't come in for table reads due to the birth of her first daughter.

A July 1997 article from USA Today revealed that the upcoming season would include guest appearances from Troy Aikman, Burt Reynolds, Sally Field, Chris Rock, Green Day and Jennifer Jason Leigh. The article also mentioned that the Hill family would make a guest cameo as in-universe characters on an upcoming episode of The Simpsons (the episode, titled "Bart Star", aired on Fox in November 1997). The crossover featured the voice of Mike Judge, with Daniels (an ex-Simpsons writer) explaining to USA Today that, "In the world of King of the Hill, The Simpsons exists only in that Bobby has a Bart doll. They exist as a TV show."

The Christmas episode "The Unbearable Blindness of Laying" originated from an idea that was jotted down on an index card, which sat alongside dozens of other story ideas on a conference-room wall, until executive story editor Paul Lieberstein decided to take the story further. It featured a sex scene between Hank's mother and her new boyfriend, which Daniels viewed as risque. On the night before the episode's table read, the writers spent until 5 a.m. reworking the script of this episode, changing both the sex scene and the personality of the boyfriend character, as Daniels deemed him as too plain. Regarding the sex scene, Daniels remarked at the time, "we [needed] to find a way to have adults know what's going on but have kids see something else."

In the episode "Traffic Jam", the comedian character guest voiced by Chris Rock was originally called "Busta Nut" in the script. The Fox Standards & Practices department objected, claiming that "Bust a nut" was slang for masturbation. His name was then changed to "Booty Sack" and finally "Booda Sack."

== Broadcast history ==
The episodes originally aired Sundays at 8:30–9:00 p.m. (EST) on the Fox Broadcasting Company.

== Reception ==
In his September 1997 review of "How to Fire a Rifle Without Really Trying", Chris Vognar of the Orlando Sentinel wrote that. "King of the Hill continues to hit the funny bone because it's more real and touching than any non-animated comedy on the air." He went on to write, "the show looks to have more of an edge this year; one future episode finds Hank and Dale mistaking crack for fishing bait, and the humor in week one is already carrying a more subversive tone without losing its human touch." In his 2004 review of the DVD release, IGN's Tal Blevins gave the season a positive review, writing, "while the characters were still coming into their own in season one, the second season is where the show really gelled, and the characters were molded into how we know them today."

Mike Judge said in a 2006 interview with IGN that "Junkie Business" was one of his favorite episodes of the series.

== Episodes ==
| No. overall | No. in season | Title | Directed by | Written by | Original release date | Prod. code | U.S. viewers (millions) |
|---|---|---|---|---|---|---|---|
| 13 | 1 | "How to Fire a Rifle Without Really Trying" | Adam Kuhlman | Paul Lieberstein | September 21, 1997 | 5E01 | 17.34 |
When Bobby displays a talent for target shooting, Hank signs up for a father–son fun shoot competition—only to discover a buried childhood memory is still sadly affecting his aim. Guest stars: Angela Kinsey as Angela and Wallace Shawn as Philip Ny
| 14 | 2 | "Texas City Twister" | Jeff Myers | Cheryl Holliday | September 28, 1997 | 5E02 | 15.81 |
Hank must save Peggy and Luanne from a tornado after he regrets not showing remorse for throwing Luanne out of the house and moving her back to the trailer that she moved out of after her mother tried to kill her father.
| 15 | 3 | "Arrow Head" | Klay Hall | Jonathan Aibel and Glenn Berger | October 19, 1997 | 5E04 | 13.58 |
Peggy's excitement over finding Indian artifacts in the front yard distresses Hank when a condescending university professor tricks Peggy into letting him dig in the Hills' yard. Jonathan Joss takes over the role of John Redcorn from this episode onward. Guest star: Maurice LaMarche as Professor Lerner
| 16 | 4 | "Hilloween" | John Rice | David Zuckerman | October 26, 1997 | 5E06 | 17.92 |
Hank goes to war with a litigious Evangelical Christian woman (Sally Field) bent on banning Halloween and indoctrinating the kids by inviting them to a hell house, and Peggy gives Luanne a piece of her mind when a freshly-converted Luanne says Peggy does not have good morals and values.
| 17 | 5 | "Jumpin' Crack Bass (It's a Gas, Gas, Gas)" | Gary McCarver | Alan R. Cohen & Alan Freedland | November 2, 1997 | 5E03 | 19.64 |
Hank finds himself facing possible jail time after mistakenly buying crack cocaine to use as fish bait and the only way out is to prove that crack cocaine can be useful as fish bait.
| 18 | 6 | "Husky Bobby" | Martin Archer | Jonathan Collier | November 9, 1997 | 5E05 | 20.04 |
Hank is determined to save his son from humiliation after Bobby becomes a model for a husky boy clothing line.
| 19 | 7 | "The Man Who Shot Cane Skretteburg" | Monte Young | Johnny Hardwick | November 16, 1997 | 5E07 | 21.56 |
Hank, Boomhauer, Bill and Dale face off in a paintball war against the teenage members of a garage band (guest-voiced by the members of the pop-punk band Green Day). Guest stars: Tre Cool as Cane Skretteburg, Billie Joe Armstrong as Face and Mike Dirnt as Zeus.
| 20 | 8 | "The Son That Got Away" | Tricia Garcia | Jim Dauterive | November 23, 1997 | 5E08 | 18.30 |
Bobby, Connie and Joseph run away to "The Caves" (where "half of Arlen's unplanned pregnancies begin," according to Peggy) after Bobby and Connie get in trouble at school for disrupting class.
| 21 | 9 | "The Company Man" | Klay Hall | Jim Dauterive | December 7, 1997 | 4E12 | 18.17 |
When a new housing development is in need of a propane supplier, Buck instructs Hank to show the owner, an obnoxious Northerner who acts like a Southerner, a good time. However, Hank is none too thrilled to learn that this will require him to act like a cowboy stereotype. Guest stars: Burt Reynolds as M.F. Thatherton, Billy West as Mr. Holloway and Stockard Channing as Mrs. Holloway; Note: This episode aired during season two and is usually shown in its aired order as a second season episode, despite having a season one production code. It is also included on the Season 1 DVD.
| 22 | 10 | "Bobby Slam" | Chris Moeller | Gina Fattore | December 14, 1997 | 5E10 | 18.27 |
Hank is delighted when Bobby announces he is joining the school wrestling team, but Peggy is mortified when she learns her son must first wrestle Connie in order to make the team.
| 23 | 11 | "The Unbearable Blindness of Laying" | Cyndi Tang | Paul Lieberstein | December 21, 1997 | 5E09 | 17.21 |
In the series' first Christmas episode, Hank is psychologically shocked into blindness after accidentally catching a glimpse of his visiting mother (Tammy Wynette) and her new Jewish boyfriend (Carl Reiner) having sex on Hank's kitchen table.
| 24 | 12 | "Meet the Manger Babies" | Jeff Myers | Jonathan Aibel & Glenn Berger | January 11, 1998 | 5E12 | 19.71 |
Hank faces a dilemma of Biblical proportions when Luanne asks him to portray God in a live TV broadcast of her Christian puppet show (The Manger Babies), which is scheduled to air during Hank's beloved Super Bowl party. Guest star: Troy Aikman as himself
| 25 | 13 | "Snow Job" | Adam Kuhlman | Cheryl Holliday, Alan R. Cohen & Alan Freedland, and Jim Dauterive | February 1, 1998 | 5E11 | 15.20 |
During a rare snowstorm in Texas, Buck Strickland has a heart attack and hires an incompetent worker to run his company while Hank is chosen to house-sit -- and Hank's world is shattered when he finds that Buck is only in the propane business for the cash and not the customer satisfaction.
| 26 | 14 | "I Remember Mono" | Wes Archer | Paul Lieberstein | February 8, 1998 | 5E13 | 16.38 |
While updating files at Arlen High School, Peggy learns that Hank's two-week absence from classes during their high school days was due to mononucleosis, not a back injury, and is crushed that what was a romantic story of young love is now a lie. Guest star: Jennifer Jason Leigh as Amy
| 27 | 15 | "Three Days of the Kahndo" | Lauren MacMullan | John Altschuler & Dave Krinsky | February 15, 1998 | 5E15 | 16.77 |
Kahn's misreading of an advertisement for a Mexican timeshare results in him, Hank, and Dale getting trapped in Mexico, while Luanne and Bobby try to hide some contraband beauty products. Guest star: Paul Rodriguez as Jacinto
| 28 | 16 | "Traffic Jam" | Klay Hall | Johnny Hardwick | February 22, 1998 | 5E14 | 16.81 |
When Hank and Kahn collide with each other's cars, they are both forced to attend traffic school courses taught by a raunchy black comedian (Chris Rock) named Roger "Buddha" Sack, who irritates Hank but becomes an eager Bobby's comedy mentor--which becomes a fraught situation when Bobby misinterprets Buddha's advice and finds inspiration from neo-Nazi websites. Note: This episode is also known as "Def Traffic Jam".
| 29 | 17 | "Hank's Dirty Laundry" | Shaun Cashman | Jonathan Aibel & Glenn Berger | March 1, 1998 | 5E16 | 18.60 |
While purchasing a new dryer, Hank discovers that his credit is bad, thanks to a video store clerk who accuses Hank of renting a pornographic video and never returning it. No one believes or supports Hank, but he sets out to prove he never rented the tape anyway. Guest star: Lynne Thigpen as Judge.
| 30 | 18 | "The Final Shinsult" | Jack Dyer | Alan R. Cohen & Alan Freedland | March 15, 1998 | 5E17 | 15.57 |
After losing his driver's license and throwing Hank's stepmother Didi out of the house, Cotton moves in with Dale and plots to steal Antonio López de Santa Anna's wooden leg from a museum to use as a bargaining chip with the DMV.
| 31 | 19 | "Leanne's Saga" | Tricia Garcia | David Zuckerman | April 19, 1998 | 5E18 | 14.49 |
Luanne's alcoholic mother is released from prison and starts dating Bill, whom she begins to abuse. Bill, meanwhile, is forced to give up alcohol, due to taking a new type of medication for his toe fungus, but ends up spending so much money on Leanne that he can no longer afford his medication.
| 32 | 20 | "Junkie Business" | Cyndi Tang | Jim Dauterive | April 26, 1998 | 5E19 | 15.97 |
Strickland Propane's new employee (whom Hank hired because he preferred a man over the qualified woman who applied) turns out to be a drug addict who uses a legal trick that frees him from responsibility on the job and from being fired. Meanwhile, Peggy fears that the woman Hank turned down for the job may be after Hank.
| 33 | 21 | "Life in the Fast Lane, Bobby's Saga" | Adam Kuhlman | John Altschuler & Dave Krinsky | May 3, 1998 | 5E21 | 15.27 |
After Hank is critical of his lazy and entitled behavior, Bobby gets a job as a concession boy at the Arlen race track, where he discovers that his boss (David Herman) is a mentally disabled sociopath. Bobby hides the truth of his miserable existence but Hank eventually figures out what's going on. Meanwhile, Boomhauer is given the chance to drive the pace car in an upcoming race. Guest star: Dale Earnhardt
| 34 | 22 | "Peggy's Turtle Song" | Jeff Myers | Brent Forrester | May 10, 1998 | 5E22 | 14.32 |
When Bobby is misdiagnosed with attention deficit disorder (after eating too much sugary cereal and disrupting class), Peggy quits her job as a substitute teacher and becomes a stay-at-home mom, but soon realizes that she needs a hobby for her newfound time and begins taking guitar lessons. Guest star: Ani DiFranco as Emily.
| 35 | 23 | "Propane Boom" (Part 1) | Gary McCarver | Norm Hiscock | May 17, 1998 | 5E23 | 16.03 |
Hank loses his job when Mega Lo Mart begins selling propane at cheaper prices than Strickland Propane, leading to him working there while planning to disrupt a Chuck Mangione concert at the store in protest. Something else, however, causes an even bigger disruption. The plot concludes in the third season opener "Death of a Propane Salesman".

== Home media ==
The season was released on DVD by 20th Century Fox Home Entertainment. "The Company Man" was released on the Season 1 DVD due to its production code. It is presented as a season two episode on Hulu, Disney+ internationally and most syndicated packages (barring Cartoon Network's late night block Adult Swim).
