= King of the Hill season 5 =

King of the Hill
- Season 5
- DVD cover
- Showrunner: Richard Appel
- Starring: Mike Judge; Kathy Najimy; Pamela Adlon; Brittany Murphy; Johnny Hardwick; Stephen Root; Toby Huss
- No. of episodes: 20

Release
- Original network: Fox
- Original release: October 1, 2000 – May 13, 2001

Season chronology
- ← Previous; Season 4 Next → Season 6

The fifth season of King of the Hill originally aired Sundays at 7:30–8:00 p.m. (EST) from October 1, 2000 to May 13, 2001. The season includes the series' 100th episode.

== Production ==
The showrunner for the season was Richard Appel. Several of the show's original writers, such as Paul Lieberstein, left in the middle of the season. Bobby and his friends growing up was a minor theme for the season.

== Reception ==
In November 2000, David Bianculli of the New York Daily News labelled it as an "especially ambitious season", citing the episode "I Don't Want to Wait…" where the character Joseph hits puberty, commenting that he is "one of the first regular animated characters in a TV series to enter adolescence." Diane Werts of the Los Angeles Times wrote in February 2001 that, "King of the Hill is blissfully free of tired irony and sarcasm, while still sharp and contemporary. Young viewers are especially lovin’ it, landing the show in prime time’s top 20 among teens and adults 18 to 34."

In 2008, Jaime Weinman of Canadian magazine Maclean's noted that during Season 5 and Season 6, co-creators Mike Judge and Greg Daniels had begun to be less involved with the show. Weinman wrote, "the style of the show in those seasons was pretty similar to the style of the first few seasons, but a little broader and wilder", adding, "there was some difference of opinion as to how well this approach was working. Judge, for one, has been pretty clear in interviews that he thought the show was going wrong in these seasons, making too much fun of Hank and reflecting the obsessions of the Harvard-educated writers who were running it."

== Episodes ==
No. overall	No. in season	Title	Directed by	Written by	Original release date	Prod. code	U.S. viewers (millions)
85	1	"The Perils of Polling"	Kyounghee Lim & Boohwan Lim	Jim Dauterive	October 1, 2000	5ABE02	9.59
When Hank takes Luanne to an election fair, Hank meets George W. Bush and shakes his hand, only to discover that Bush's handshake is weak, giving Hank doubts about voting for him. Meanwhile, Luanne becomes infatuated with Communist candidate Robert Parigi.
86	2	"The Buck Stops Here"	Mike DiMartino	Norm Hiscock	November 5, 2000	5ABE01	11.53
Hank forces Bobby to get a summer job and Bobby becomes Buck Strickland's golf caddy. Meanwhile, Peggy and Minh try to outdo each other in donating blood. Guest stars: Andrew Lawrence as Caddy
87	3	"I Don't Want To Wait For Our Lives To Be Over, I Want To Know Right Now, Will It Be... Sorry. Do Do Doo Do Do, Do Do Doo Do Do, Do Do Doo Do Do, Doo..."	Adam Kuhlman	Paul Lieberstein	November 12, 2000	4ABE24	11.56
With Bobby's 13th birthday approaching, Joseph comes back from summer vacation having grown six inches. Bobby is upset that everyone still treats him like a little kid, and Joseph is being driven crazy by the onset of puberty, leading him to make out with Connie. Meanwhile, Hank tries to build coffins for himself and Peggy. NOTE: As of this episode, Joseph Gribble is now voiced by Breckin Meyer instead of Brittany Murphy. The title is often shortened to "I Don't Want to Wait…".
88	4	"Spin the Choice"	Allan Jacobsen	Paul Lieberstein	November 19, 2000	5ABE05	10.22
Despite Hank's promise to let him carve the turkey this year, Bobby boycotts Thanksgiving after receiving history lessons from John Redcorn that expose the shameful history behind it. Meanwhile, Peggy creates a pointless new game called "Spin the Choice" when everyone gets sick of playing Boggle with her every year.
89	5	"Peggy Makes the Big Leagues"	Dominic Polcino	Johnny Hardwick	November 26, 2000	5ABE04	8.44
Peggy substitute-teaches at Arlen High School, but arouses the enmity of nearly all (including Hank and her fellow teachers) when she gives the school's unacademic football star (Brendan Fraser) a failing grade. Other guest Stars: Amy Hill as Mrs. Kalaiki-Ali'i
90	6	"When Cotton Comes Marching Home"	Tricia Garcia	Alan R. Cohen & Alan Freedland	December 3, 2000	5ABE03	9.53
When Cotton goes broke and loses his house, he moves his family to the VFW in Arlen and wants to march in the Veterans Day parade, but his boss denies him the time off from his degrading restroom attendant job. He is also irritated when Peggy tries to obtain his war medals for her float.
91	7	"What Makes Bobby Run?"	Cyndi Tang-Loveland	Alex Gregory & Peter Huyck	December 10, 2000	5ABE07	11.87
When Bobby becomes the school mascot, the "Landry Longhorn," he is branded a coward after he runs away from a traditional half-time beating by the opposing team's band.
92	8	"Twas the Nut Before Christmas"	Jeff Myers	John Altschuler & Dave Krinsky	December 17, 2000	5ABE08	11.71
In the fourth Christmas episode, Bill's holiday loneliness leads to him opening a "Christmas village" in his yard, but things get out of hand when he takes on a twenty-something petty criminal (voiced by Ryan Phillippe) as a surrogate son and keeps his Christmas decorations up past the holiday season. Guest Stars: Ryan Phillipe as Wally
93	9	"Chasing Bobby"	A. Lioi	Garland Testa	January 21, 2001	5ABE10	10.33
When Hank becomes unusually emotional, especially while seeing a dramatic movie about a father and son's strained relationship, Peggy believes it's because he hasn't bonded with Bobby, but Hank is more concerned about his truck, which is about to stop functioning completely.
94	10	"Yankee Hankee"	Adam Kuhlman	Kit Boss	February 4, 2001	5ABE06	11.46
Hank's application for a "native Texan" license plate leads him to the utterly shocking news that he was born in New York City, while Cotton and his cronies hatched a hare-brained scheme to assassinate Cuba's revolutionary leader Fidel Castro. Guest Stars: Ed Asner as Stinky and Jack Carter as Irwin Linker
95	11	"Hank and the Great Glass Elevator"	Gary McCarver	Jonathan Collier	February 11, 2001	5ABE12	9.68
On a day-trip to Austin for Bill's 43rd birthday, the guys trick Hank and moon the former Governor of Texas, Ann Richards (guest-starring as herself), leading Bill to take the blame and eventually enter a relationship with her. Bill's time with her leads to a fateful encounter with the last person he would ever expect to see again: his ex-wife, Lenore (Ellen Barkin). Meanwhile, Peggy and Bobby try hamburgers grilled on a charcoal-powered barbecue for the first time -- and run afoul of Hank's none-too-subtle loyalties to propane when he discovers their stockpile of charcoal briquettes upon returning. NOTE: This is Lenore's sole appearance on the show.
96	12	"Now Who's the Dummy?"	Dominic Polcino	Johnny Hardwick	February 18, 2001	5ABE14	10.07
Bobby acquires a ventriloquist's dummy named Chip Block, which dredges up childhood anxieties for Dale. Meanwhile, Hank becomes overly attached to Chip due to the dummy's "knowledge" of sports. Guest Stars: Tom Poston as Mr. Popper
97	13	"Ho Yeah!"	Tricia Garcia	Alex Gregory & Peter Huyck	February 25, 2001	5ABE15	11.55
Tammi (Renée Zellweger), a prostitute from The OKC hires on at Strickland Propane, moves in with the Hills, and encourages Peggy to add spice to her own life, but things heat up when Tammi's ex-pimp Alabaster Jones (Snoop Dogg) comes to Arlen and mistakes Hank for a pimp trying to steal Tammi away from him.
98	14	"The Exterminator"	Shaun Cashman	Dean Young	March 4, 2001	5ABE09	10.39
Dale goes from killing bugs to killing careers after being forced to take an office job when a doctor tells Dale that being exposed to insecticide will kill him before he turns 50. Guest Stars: Lisa Kudrow as Amy Pittman and Stephen Tobolowsky as Dr. Benson and Burt Halverstrom.
99	15	"Luanne Virgin 2.0"	Adam Kuhlman	Kit Boss	March 11, 2001	5ABE16	9.29
When Luanne reveals to Hank that she is no longer a virgin (after her latest boyfriend breaks up with her), Hank puts Luanne in the church's "born-again virgin" program, where Luanne meets a sexually insecure man (Owen Wilson) and Peggy confesses that she had sex with a man (who turned out to be a homosexual) before she met Hank. Other guest Stars: Nathan Fillion as Frisbee Guy.
100	16	"Hank's Choice"	Kyounghee Lim & Boohwan Lim	Jon Vitti	April 1, 2001	5ABE11	7.52
When it turns out that Bobby is allergic to Lady Bird, he ends up living in Lady Bird's luxurious new doghouse while Lady Bird continues living in the house, which makes the Hills a laughingstock with the neighbors.
101	17	"It's Not Easy Being Green"	Jeff Myers	John Altschuler & Dave Krinsky	April 8, 2001	5ABE18	7.66
Bobby gets into helping the environment, which threatens to reveal a 30-year-old secret kept by Hank, Dale, and Bill. Guest Stars: Paul Giamatti as Mr. McKay.
102	18	"The Trouble with Gribbles"	Shaun Cashman	Jim Dauterive	April 22, 2001	5ABE19	7.85
Nancy fears losing her job after the network considers hiring Luanne because she's younger and prettier, and Dale decides to sue his favorite tobacco company (Manitoba Cigarettes) so he can win money for the operation, but Nancy mistakes Dale trying to get evidence that Manitoba Cigarettes caused Nancy to lose her looks as a sign that Dale feels the same way about her as the network executives. Guest stars Robert Stack (uncredited in his final role) as Reynolds Penland
103	19	"Hank's Back Story"	Cyndi Tang-Loveland	Alan R. Cohen & Alan Freedland	May 6, 2001	5ABE17	8.54
Hank is diagnosed with "diminished gluteal syndrome" (a condition in which the muscles in the gluteus maximus shrink in size and put pressure on the spine) and is faced with choosing his health over his dignity when the doctor prescribes him a prosthetic posterior to wear. Guest Stars: Harry Groener as Dr. Tate and Larry, Tom McGowan as Dr. Newman and Dave, and Dave Thomas as Wayne
104	20	"Kidney Boy and Hamster Girl: A Love Story"	Gary McCarver	Garland Testa	May 13, 2001	5ABE22	8.17
Bobby pretends to be a high school student with a kidney disorder that stunted his growth and helps the student body win a radio station contest, with ska band No Doubt performing at the high school prom as the prize. Meanwhile, Dale gets a porta-potty for the alley so no one will have to go into the house to use the bathroom. Guest Stars: No Doubt as themselves

== Home video ==
The Region 1 DVD for North America was released on November 22, 2005, in a box containing three DVD cases. The Region 1 DVD was later reissued to have all the discs contained in a single DVD case, like with the Region 2 and Region 4 releases. The Region 2 DVD for the United Kingdom was released on February 26, 2007, while the Region 4 DVD for Australia was released on April 28, 2008. It is to date the last season of the show to be released on home video in Region 4.
