= Victor Aaron =

Native American actor (1956–1996)

- Aaron in The Rockford Files telefilm "Godfather Knows Best" (1996)
- Born: Victor Aaron Ramirez; September 11, 1956; Odessa, Texas, U.S.
- Died: September 4, 1996 (aged 39); Palm Springs, California, U.S.
- Occupation: Actor
- Years active: 1993–1996
- Height: 5 ft 10 in (178 cm)
- Spouse: Eduvina Matta (m. 1980; div. 1984)
- Children: 2

Victor Aaron Ramirez (September 11, 1956 – September 4, 1996) was a Native American actor of Yaqui descent. He was the original voice of John Redcorn on King of the Hill, which was taken over by Jonathan Joss in the show's second season following Aaron's death.

== Early life ==
Victor Aaron Ramirez was born on September 11, 1956, in Odessa, Texas. His parents were of Yaqui ancestry. Aaron grew up in a mobile home with his brothers and sisters in a poor family. After graduating from high school in Austin, he got married and worked for a casino. Afterward, he moved to California and became an actor.

== Death ==
Aaron died in a car accident on September 4, 1996, at the age of 39, one week before his 40th birthday, when his car was struck at an intersection by a truck that ran a red light. He was survived by two daughters. The King of the Hill episode "The Order of the Straight Arrow" is dedicated to his memory.

== Filmography ==
=== Film ===
Year	Title	Role	Notes
1993	Geronimo: An American Legend	Ulzana	
1994	Silent Fury		
1996	The Sunchaser	Webster Skyhorse	
1996	Bulletproof	Hispanic Man	

=== Television ===
Year	Title	Role	Notes
1994	Burke's Law	Oscar	Episode: "Who Killed Good Time Charlie?"
1994	A Perry Mason Mystery: The Case of The Grimacing Governor	John Sleepwater	TV movie
1996	The Rockford Files: Godfather Knows Best	Mercer Pinetree	TV movie
1996	Dr. Quinn, Medicine Woman	Pawnee Elder	Episode: "One Nation"
1996	Dead Man's Walk	Gomez	TV mini-series, 2 episodes
1996	Crazy Horse	Touch the Clouds	TV movie
1997	King of the Hill	John Redcorn (voice)	2 episodes; posthumous release
