= King of the Hill season 4 =

King of the Hill
- Season 4
- DVD cover
- Showrunners: Greg Daniels; Richard Appel
- Starring: Mike Judge; Kathy Najimy; Pamela Adlon; Brittany Murphy; Johnny Hardwick; Stephen Root
- No. of episodes: 24

Release
- Original network: Fox
- Original release: September 26, 1999 – May 21, 2000

Season chronology
- ← Previous; Season 3 Next → Season 5

The fourth season of King of the Hill originally aired Sundays at 7:30–8:00 p.m. (EST) on the Fox Broadcasting Company from September 26, 1999 to May 21, 2000. The Region 1 DVD was released on May 3, 2005. The Region 2 and 4 DVDs were respectively released on January 15 and June 20, 2007.

== Production ==
The showrunners for the season were Greg Daniels and Richard Appel. The episode "Transnational Amusements Presents: Peggy's Magic Sex Feet" focused on fetish websites, with a real interactive website being created to promote the episode, under the domain name peggysfeet.com. The cross-media stunt originated after staff writers were discussing how domain names on the internet can sell for large prices. Shortly after writing the episode, Jonathan Collier registered the address peggysfeet.com, with Richard Appel telling Entertainment Weekly in 2000, "I got a message from Twentieth Century Fox months later saying, 'we wanted to get peggysfeet.com, but it's already owned by someone.' And I said, 'well, luckily it's one of the writers on our show.' I'd like to believe that had we not registered it, 7 million people would have tried to after the episode aired." Appel also noted that they researched various fetish websites for the episode, saying "I do know that some visits — purely for purposes of accuracy — were made to these types of websites. I haven't yet visited one, but the general consensus was that it's much more about the smushing of mashed potatoes and worms than actual sex."

== Episodes ==
| No. overall | No. in season | Title | Directed by | Written by | Original release date | Prod. code | U.S. viewers (millions) |
|---|---|---|---|---|---|---|---|
| 61 | 1 | "...Peggy Hill: The Decline and Fall" (Part 2) | Klay Hall | Paul Lieberstein | September 26, 1999 | 3ABE24 | 9.74 |
Conclusion. Peggy struggles to regain her strength following her skydiving accident. Meanwhile, Bobby delivers his uncle, Cotton's son and Hank's half-brother (whom Cotton names "Good Hank") but gets overwhelmed when neither Cotton nor Didi embrace new parenthood.
| 62 | 2 | "Cotton's Plot" | Anthony Lioi | Jonathan Aibel & Glenn Berger | October 3, 1999 | 4ABE01 | 7.54 |
Cotton takes over Peggy's physical therapy in exchange for help getting a burial plot in the Texas State Cemetery, which works well until Peggy discovers a discrepancy about Cotton's service in the Army during World War II.
| 63 | 3 | "Bills Are Made to Be Broken" | Jeff Myers | John Altschuler & Dave Krinsky | October 24, 1999 | 4ABE02 | 6.68 |
Bill's high school football record is broken unfairly, and (largely at Hank's insistence) he tries to get back on the field to set things right.
| 64 | 4 | "Little Horrors of Shop" | Adam Kuhlman | Kit Boss | October 31, 1999 | 4ABE03 | 9.76 |
Buck Strickland insists that Hank take two weeks off from Strickland Propane, and Hank begins teaching wood shop at Tom Landry Middle School, and becomes so popular that Peggy grows envious of him. However, Hank gets in trouble for violating the school's zero-tolerance policy on weapons when he asks his students to bring in tools from home.
| 65 | 5 | "Aisle 8A" | Allan Jacobsen | Garland Testa | November 7, 1999 | 4ABE04 | 8.53 |
Kahn and Minh go to Hawaii for Kahn's job and asks Hank to take care of Connie, who is excited that she will be staying with Bobby, but starts to become emotionally sensitive and mean-spirited when she gets her first period, leaving an extremely uncomfortable Hank to both deal with the unstable Connie and have to explain "the birds and the bees" to a clueless Bobby.
| 66 | 6 | "A Beer Can Named Desire" | Chuck Austen and Chris Moeller | Jim Dauterive | November 14, 1999 | 4ABE05 | 10.20 |
Hank wins an Alamo Beer contest for a chance to win a million dollars by throwing a football through a one-foot hole in a giant Alamo Beer can, while Bill visits his eccentric Cajun relatives in Louisiana. Guest voices: Don Meredith, Meryl Streep, The Chicks (Martie Maguire, Natalie Maines, and Emily Robison).
| 67 | 7 | "Happy Hank's Giving" | Martin Archer | Alan R. Cohen & Alan Freedland | November 21, 1999 | 4ABE08 | 11.45 |
The Hills plan to fly to Montana for Thanksgiving, but are stranded alongside their neighbors at the airport by an ice storm.
| 68 | 8 | "Not in My Back-hoe" | Shaun Cashman | Paul Lieberstein | November 28, 1999 | 4ABE06 | 9.60 |
Drew Carey guest stars as a man who befriends Hank Hill after the two discover that they are very much alike. Meanwhile, Bill and Dale steal Hank's backhoe and take it to a pet cemetery, with disastrous results.
| 69 | 9 | "To Kill a Ladybird" | Wes Archer | Norm Hiscock | December 12, 1999 | 4ABE07 | 10.77 |
Bobby befriends a wild raccoon, that may, or may not have infected Dale and Ladybird with rabies.
| 70 | 10 | "Hillennium" | Tricia Garcia | Johnny Hardwick | December 19, 1999 | 4ABE10 | 8.07 |
As Christmas approaches, Hank gets irritated over everyone panicking about the supposed technological apocalypse that will purportedly happen on January 1, 2000, due to the Y2K computer date glitch—but soon finds himself trying to safeguard his family after a propane shortage.
| 71 | 11 | "Old Glory" | Gary McCarver | Norm Hiscock | January 9, 2000 | 4ABE09 | 10.25 |
Peggy writes a school essay for Bobby, and they both catch fire for it by a vengeful English teacher who accuses them of plagiarism. Meanwhile, Bill buys an oversized flag from the Army that is very special to him, but causes problems to his neighbors. Guest Stars: Heather Locklear as Peggy Donovan
| 72 | 12 | "Rodeo Days" | Cyndi Tang-Loveland | Jon Vitti | January 16, 2000 | 4ABE11 | 11.63 |
When the rodeo comes to Arlen, Bobby tries his hand at cattle roping; when he fails miserably, he takes his career in the other direction, choosing to become a rodeo clown, much to Hank and Peggy's dismay. Guest Stars: Andrew Lawrence as Rodeo Kid
| 73 | 13 | "Hanky Panky" (Part 1) | Jeff Myers | Jim Dauterive | February 6, 2000 | 4ABE13 | 9.50 |
Part one of two. Buck Strickland and his wife Miz Liz (Kathleen Turner) separate, and Buck dumps his secretary/mistress Debbie Grund (Reese Witherspoon) — and Hank becomes an object of desire for Miz Liz while Debbie plots to murder Buck Strickland. Meanwhile, Peggy becomes the proprietor of Sugarfoot's Barbecue Restaurant and finds Debbie Grund's dead body in a Dumpster.
| 74 | 14 | "High Anxiety" (Part 2) | Adam Kuhlman | Alan R. Cohen & Alan Freedland | February 13, 2000 | 4ABE14 | 10.88 |
Conclusion. Peggy continues her experiment in running Sugarfoot's, while Hank inadvertently tries marijuana and becomes a person of interest in Debbie Grund's murder — until a Texas Ranger discovers the truth behind Debbie's death. Guest Stars: Kathleen Turner as Ms. Liz Strickland, Mac Davis as Sheriff Buford and Phil LaMarr as Texas Ranger Payton; NOTE: On Adult Swim, this episode is rated TV-14 for references to drugs (marijuana), gun violence, and unintentional suicide.
| 75 | 15 | "Naked Ambition" | Anthony Lioi | Jonathan Aibel & Glenn Berger | February 20, 2000 | 4ABE12 | 10.24 |
After a day of swimming at the river, Bobby accidentally walks in on Luanne naked. When Joseph hears the story, his imagination runs wild and he wants to see her nude too—until Connie catches them peeping. Meanwhile, Boomhauer floats down a river and ends up in Houston, where he is committed to a mental hospital due to his unintelligible speech. Note: This is the final episode with Brittany Murphy voices Joseph.
| 76 | 16 | "Movin' on Up" | Klay Hall | Garland Testa | February 27, 2000 | 4ABE16 | 10.95 |
Fed up with Hank's demands, Luanne moves out of the Hills' den—and into a house with a trio of even more aggravating college-aged deadbeats. Guest Stars: Andy Dick as Griffin, Vicki Lewis as Kate and Maura Tierney as Tanya
| 77 | 17 | "Bill of Sales" | Dominic Polcino | Paul Lieberstein | March 12, 2000 | 4ABE15 | 9.35 |
Peggy reluctantly recruits Bill into a pyramid scheme and is pleasantly surprised by his superb sales abilities, but she is genuinely surprised when her for-once sincere praise for him leads to him being unable to sell anymore. Guest Stars: Teri Garr as Laney
| 78 | 18 | "Won't You Pimai Neighbor?" | Kyounghee Lim & Boowhan Lim | John Altschuler & Dave Krinsky | March 19, 2000 | 4ABE18 | 9.37 |
Bobby undergoes tests to find out if he is the reincarnation of the Buddhist Lama Sanglug, much to Hank's discomfort. Guest Stars: Soon-Tek Oh as Monk
| 79 | 19 | "Hank's Bad Hair Day" | Gary McCarver | Jon Vitti | April 9, 2000 | 4ABE19 | 8.16 |
Hank reluctantly moves on from his longtime barber (Brian Doyle-Murray) when the old guy develops age-related dementia. He gets a haircut on the Army base from Bill, and loves Bill's work, but not the $900 bill he gets from the Army. His protest leads to Hank getting a huge reward from the government for exposing wasteful spending--which costs Bill his position as the base's hairstylist.
| 80 | 20 | "Meet the Propaniacs" | Shaun Cashman | Kit Boss | April 16, 2000 | 4ABE17 | 6.83 |
While working for Hank during the summer at Strickland Propane (instead of going to an acting camp), Bobby, some Strickland co-workers, Dale, and Luanne form a sketch comedy troupe called The Propaniacs. Guest Stars: Lane Smith as Charlie Fortner
| 81 | 21 | "Nancy Boys" | Tricia Garcia | Jonathan Aibel & Glenn Berger | April 30, 2000 | 4ABE20 | 7.81 |
Nancy breaks off her adulterous affair with John Redcorn after going on a date with Dale and falling in love with him all over again.
| 82 | 22 | "Flush with Power" | Allan Jacobsen | Alex Gregory & Peter Huyck | May 7, 2000 | 4ABE22 | 6.86 |
A major drought in Arlen exposes a great deal of corruption, from bribes to deliberately installed low-flush power toilets, and Hank joins the local Zoning Ordinances Board to set things right. Guest Stars: Lane Smith as Nate Hashaway
| 83 | 23 | "Transnational Amusements Presents: Peggy's Magic Sex Feet" | Cyndi Tang-Loveland | Jonathan Collier | May 14, 2000 | 4ABE21 | 7.93 |
After admitting her real shoe size during a night of bowling and learning from a shoe salesman that she's a size 16-and-a-half and will hit a size 20 in a few years, Peggy feels ashamed of her big feet—until a self-proclaimed "foot doctor" (Sydney Pollack) makes Peggy an Internet star on a foot fetish website.
| 84 | 24 | "Peggy's Fan Fair" | Jeff Myers | Alan R. Cohen & Alan Freedland | May 21, 2000 | 4ABE23 | 7.22 |
While attending a Nashville music festival with Hank and the guys, Peggy claims that Randy Travis (guest starring as himself) stole lyrics from a song she wrote years ago. Other guest voices: Brooks & Dunn, Charlie Daniels, Martina McBride, Clint Black, Lisa Hartman Black, Wynonna Judd, Terri Clark, Travis Tritt, Vince Gill, and Tony Danza.
