= Chip Hall =

American television producer and writer (born 1973)

Chip Hall (born November 5, 1973) is an American television producer and writer, best known for his work on the Fox animated sitcom King of the Hill, on which he worked as a writer and producer for six years. He was a writer and producer on the Spike TV comedy, Blue Mountain State. He wrote five episodes for the show, including "LAX", "Marathon Monday" and "Cum Ransom".

Hall is also developing the movie Liam McBain: International Tennis Star and Proper English Geezer at Warner Bros. Pictures with Pete Segal attached to direct. Liam McBain is a comedy which centers on a 1980s tennis star who is half John McEnroe and half Liam Gallagher from the band Oasis.

In 2015, it was announced that Hall created and wrote Brightmoor, an animated series in development at FX, with his writing partner Chris Powell (Comedian CP) and Sean "Diddy" Combs. The show was described as a "South Park set in inner-city Detroit." After almost a decade without news, by late 2024 Brightmoor was considered fully abandoned.

Hall presently lives in West Hollywood, CA and is represented by Chris Licata at Paradigm and Trevor Engelson at Underground Films. His attorney is Gregg Gellman at Morris Yorn.
