= Adam Kuhlman =

American animation director

Adam Kuhlman is an animation director, best known for directing episodes of King of the Hill. He also works as an assistant director on the series. Kuhlman also worked on the films Fire and Ice and Tom and Jerry: The Movie.

== King of the Hill directorial credits ==
- "Hank's Unmentionable Problem"
- "How to Fire a Rifle Without Really Trying"
- "Snow Job"
- "Life in the Fast Lane, Bobby's Saga"
- "To Spank with Love"
- "Love Hurts and So Does Ar"
- "As Old as the Hills"
- "Little Horrors of Shop"
- "High Anxiety: Part 2"
- ""I Don't Want to Wait..."
- "Yankee Hankee"
- "Luanne Virgin 2.0"
- "Fun with Jane and Jane"
- "Sug Night"
- "Full Metal Dust Jacket"
- "I Never Promised You an Organic Garden"
- "Orange You Sad I Did Say Banana?"
- "Edu-macating Lucky"
