= Joe Stillman =

American screenwriter

- Born: Joseph Stillman
- Occupation: Screenwriter
- Writing career
- Notable works: Shrek (2001); Shrek 2 (2004); Planet 51 (2009)
- Notable awards: Annie, BAFTA Film Award, Video Premiere Award

Joseph Stillman is an American screenwriter, producer, and director.

Before becoming a screenwriter, he worked for several TV shows, including Beavis and Butt-head, King of the Hill, Doug, and The Adventures of Pete & Pete.

Stillman also worked on screenplays for movies including Beavis and Butt-Head Do America, Shrek and Shrek 2. He received a shared BAFTA for co-writing the first Shrek and a nomination for the Academy Award for Best Adapted Screenplay.

== Filmography ==
- Home Movies (1980 - production assistant)
- Creepshow (1982 - assistant editor)
- Doug (1991 - writer; 2 episodes)
- The Adventures of Pete & Pete (1993-1994 - writer; 3 episodes)
- Beavis and Butt-head (1993-1997 - writer)
- Beavis and Butt-head Do Christmas (1995 - writer)
- Clueless (1996 - writer; 1 episode)
- Beavis and Butt-Head Do America (1996 - writer)
- King of the Hill (1997-1998 - consultant, writer, co-producer)
- Joseph: King of Dreams (2000 - screenplay)
- Shrek (2001 - co-writer)
- Shrek 2 (2004 - screenplay)
- Round It Goes (2006 - director, writer)
- Planet 51 (2009 - scriptwriter)
- Alien Zoo (in development as of 2009)
- Gulliver's Travels (2010 - screenplay)
- Fred 2: Night of the Living Fred (2011 - screenplay)
- Sanjay and Craig (2013–2014 - writer, head writer)
- Kirby Buckets (2014-2016 - writer)
- Albert (2016 - screenplay)
- Danger & Eggs (2017 - writer)
