= Jonathan Collier =

American television writer

Jonathan Collier is an American television writer, best known for his work on The Simpsons, Monk, King of the Hill and Bones. He worked as an executive producer on Mike Reiss's DVD movie, Queer Duck: The Movie. He attended and graduated from Harvard University.

== Writing credits ==
=== The Simpsons episodes ===
He is credited with writing (or co-writing) the following episodes:

Season 6

- "Bart's Girlfriend"
- "The Springfield Connection"

Season 7

- "Lisa the Iconoclast"
- "22 Short Films About Springfield" (co-writer with Richard Appel, David X. Cohen, Matt Groening, Jennifer Crittenden, Greg Daniels, Brent Forrester, Rachel Pulido, Steve Tompkins, Dan Greaney, Bill Oakley, and Josh Weinstein)
- "Raging Abe Simpson and His Grumbling Grandson in 'The Curse of the Flying Hellfish'"

Season 8

- "The Homer They Fall"

=== King of the Hill episodes ===
He is credited with writing the following episodes:

- "Keeping Up With Our Joneses"
- "Husky Bobby"
- "The Wedding of Bobby Hill"
- "Escape from Party Island"
- "Transnational Amusements Presents: Peggy's Magic Sex Feet"
- "Hank and the Great Glass Elevator"
- "Pigmalion"
- "Dale Be Not Proud"
- "Arlen City Bomber"
- "Luanne Gets Lucky"

=== Monk episodes ===
- "Mr. Monk Goes to the Hospital"
- "Mr. Monk Goes to a Fashion Show"
- "Mr. Monk and the Buried Treasure"

=== Law and Order episodes ===
- "12 Seconds"
- "Second Chance"
