= Johnny Hardwick =

American voice actor (1958–2023)

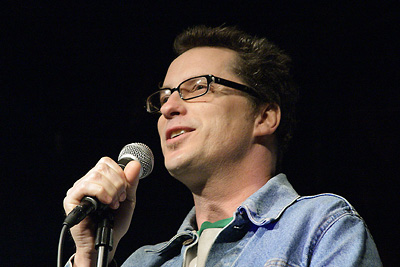
- Hardwick performing stand-up comedy in 2004
- Born: John Michael Hardwick; December 31, 1958; Austin, Texas, U.S.
- Died: c. August 8, 2023 (aged 64); Austin, Texas, U.S.
- Education: Texas Tech University (BA)
- Occupations: Voice actor; comedian; writer; producer
- Years active: 1990–2023

YouTube information
- Channel: johnny hardwick
- Years active: 2015–2023
- Genres: Song parodies; monologues
- Subscribers: 23.7 thousand
- Views: 905 thousand

John Michael Hardwick (December 31, 1958 – c. August 8, 2023) was an American voice actor, comedian, writer and producer. He was best known as the voice of Dale Gribble in the animated American television series King of the Hill. He also served as a staff writer, story editor, and producer on the show. He was nominated for Primetime Emmy Awards three times, winning once in 1999 with the rest of King of the Hill's production team.

== Early life ==
John Michael Hardwick was born in Austin, Texas, on December 31, 1958. He attended Texas Tech University in Lubbock. After graduating with a BA degree in journalism, he worked for a decade as a bartender in live blues bars in Dallas and Austin, including Nick's Uptown, Sixth Street Live and The Greenville Bar & Grill.

== Career ==
Starting in 1990, Hardwick performed stand-up comedy for a number of years, appearing at such venues as the Dallas Improv and The Velveeta Room in Austin and appearing on shows including Evening at the Improv and Caroline's Comedy Hour. He was the first comic to appear on The Jon Stewart Show. In 1995, he worked the Montreal Comedy Festival, where Brandon Tartikoff saw his set and signed him to a sitcom on NBC, which never materialized.

After Hardwick signed with the Strauss-McGarr agency, he was continually booked in stand-up across the United States. While at the Laugh Factory in Los Angeles, he performed a set about his father in Texas. Afterward, he was approached by television writers and producers Greg Daniels and Mike Judge, who were helping create the Texan-themed comedy King of the Hill.

The role of Dale Gribble was originally offered to Daniel Stern, but producers were unable to agree with Stern on a salary. Instead, Hardwick won it by not arguing about money. He performed the role for the show's entire original 13-year run and appeared in 257 of 258 episodes. At the time of his death, he was set to reprise the role again in the upcoming revival. It was later revealed that Hardwick had recorded "a couple" of new episodes for the revival prior to his death. He voiced six of the ten episodes in the 14th season. Dale Gribble was performed by Toby Huss in the remaining four episodes.

On September 12, 2012, Hardwick created a YouTube channel, though it had no uploads until 2015. In December 2018, he started regularly uploading new content. As of June 2025, the channel has 24,000 subscribers and over 930,000 total views. The channel’s content primarily consists of song parodies and monologues in the voice of Dale Gribble. In August 2025, two years after Hardwick's death, new episodes of King of the Hill were released where he reprised his role as Dale Gribble. The seventh episode of the revival and Hardwick's final episode featuring him "Any Given Hill-Day" is dedicated to him.

== Death ==
On August 8, 2023, Hardwick was found dead in the bathtub at his home in Austin following a welfare check by local authorities. He was 64 years old at the time of his death. In November, it was reported that the moderate decomposition of his body left the cause and manner of death unable to be established, but the examiner noted that his death appeared to be relatively sudden, that drowning was unlikely, and that there were no obvious signs of trauma.

== Filmography ==
Year	Title	Role	Notes
1996	Ruta Wakening	Jester	Independent film
1999	Natural Selection	Documentary Director (voice)	Short film
1999	The Collegians Are Go!!	Sleepy Student	Short film
2019	Shadows of Sofia	—N/a	Consulting producer

=== Television ===
Year	Title	Role	Notes
1992	An Evening at the Improv	Himself	
1997–2010; 2025	King of the Hill	Dale Gribble, Additional voices	Six 2025 episodes recorded prior to death (posthumous release); Also producer, supervising producer, consulting producer, writer and story editor
2003	The Making of King of the Hill	Himself	Television documentary
2009	Ace of Cakes	Himself	Episode: "King of Charm City"

=== Video games ===
Year	Title	Role	Notes
2000	King of the Hill	Dale Gribble	PC game
2022	Warped Kart Racers	Dale Gribble	Mobile game; archival recording

=== Music videos ===
Year	Title	Role	Notes
1999	Barenaked Ladies: Get in Line	Dale Gribble	Voice
