= King of the Hill season 10 =

King of the Hill
- Season 10
- DVD cover
- Showrunners: John Altschuler; Dave Krinsky
- Starring: Mike Judge; Kathy Najimy; Pamela Adlon; Brittany Murphy; Johnny Hardwick; Stephen Root; Toby Huss
- No. of episodes: 15

Release
- Original network: Fox
- Original release: September 18, 2005 – May 14, 2006

Season chronology
- ← Previous; Season 9 Next → Season 11

The tenth season of King of the Hill originally aired Sundays at 7:30–8:00 p.m. (EST) on the Fox Broadcasting Company from September 18, 2005 to May 14, 2006.

== Production ==
The showrunners for the season were John Altschuler and Dave Krinsky. Ten episodes in this season are holdover episodes from the season 9 (9ABE) production line, as well as one episode from the season 8 (8ABE) production line ("Bystand Me"). The AABE production line (much like The Simpsons 3G production line for seasons eight and nine) is a short-lived line and only lasts for five episodes (four airing this season and the fifth airing as a holdover episode in the eleventh season).

== Episodes ==
No. overall	No. in season	Title	Directed by	Written by	Original release date	Prod. code	U.S. viewers (millions)
187	1	"Hank's on Board"	Allan Jacobsen	Sivert Glarum & Michael Jamin	September 18, 2005	9ABE14	7.15
Hank fears he is being shunned when his friends go on a vacation without him. Meanwhile, Bobby uses grocery money entrusted to him by Peggy to buy a metal detector.
188	2	"Bystand Me"	Dominic Polcino	Kit Boss	September 25, 2005	8ABE21	5.65
When the Arlen Bystander newspaper gets a new editor, Peggy gets a job writing a household hints column (even though Peggy does not know any household hints and has to get them from Minh). Meanwhile, Hank makes Bobby get a paper route, but Dale, who's always wanted to work a paper route, takes over when he sees how the paper route negatively affects Bobby.
189	3	"Bill's House"	Robin Brigstocke	Tony Gama-Lobo & Rebecca May	November 6, 2005	9ABE15	7.70
After caring for the Hills when Hank, Bobby, and Peggy fall ill, Bill turns his house into a rehabilitation center for alcoholics, and enlists Hank's assistance when the task gets out of hand.
190	4	"Harlottown"	Tricia Garcia	Aron Abrams & Gregory Thompson	November 20, 2005	9ABE04	6.62
While researching for an article, Peggy discovers that Arlen's founding mothers were prostitutes (and Arlen was originally called "Harlottown"), which embarrasses Hank and prompts the city manager to cash in on the sleaziness rather than celebrate how empowered the women were back then. Guest Stars: Gary Cole as Vance Gilbert and Shannon Elizabeth as Candee
191	5	"Portrait of the Artist as a Young Clown"	Kyounghee Lim	Christy Stratton	December 4, 2005	9ABE16	6.62
Bobby goes to clown college and becomes a classical clown, but no one likes his new act except Bobby himself. Guest Stars: Paul F. Tompkins as Professor Twilley
192	6	"Orange You Sad I Did Say Banana?"	Adam Kuhlman	Dan Sterling	December 11, 2005	9ABE11	7.04
Upon being told that he is too Americanized and called a "banana" (an Asian person who acts white), Kahn vows to return to his Laotian roots, which doesn't sit well with Minh and Connie, who are used to living the excessive, pop-culture-obsessed American life. Meanwhile, Hank, Bill, Dale, and Boomhauer help Kahn build a pool in his backyard.
193	7	"You Gotta Believe (in Moderation)"	Yvette Kaplan	Kit Boss	January 29, 2006	9ABE17	5.06
Hank invites a softball team to compete against his own team of misfits, to raise money to save Tom Landry Middle School's baseball team. Guest Stars: John Schneider as The Ace
194	8	"Business Is Picking Up"	Matt Engstrom	Dan Sterling	March 19, 2006	9ABE18	5.77
Hank tries to get Bobby interested in working as a propane salesman during Tom Landry Middle School's Career Day, but when Joseph beats him to the punch, Bobby shadows a young, handsome man (voice of Johnny Knoxville) who makes his living picking up animal (and human) waste. Guest Stars: Johnny Knoxville as Peter Sterling
195	9	"The Year of Washing Dangerously"	Cyndi Tang-Loveland & Ken Wong	J.B. Cook	March 26, 2006	9ABE20	5.13
Kahn buys the local car wash as part of a get-rich-quick scheme he saw on TV, and Hank finds himself working for his disrespectful, money-obsessed neighbor when Buck takes a stake in the business as well. Meanwhile, Peggy sees Nancy screen a phone call from her and tries to figure out why.
196	10	"Hank Fixes Everything"	Dominic Polcino & Ronald Rubio	Kit Boss	April 2, 2006	9ABE21	4.45
Buck Strickland hires the Teutul family from the reality show American Chopper (who voice themselves) to perform at Strickland Propane in order to win a price war with Thatherton Fuels, then gets into a price fixing conspiracy with the other propane companies in Arlen which attracts the government's attention—centered on Hank. Meanwhile, Lucky is determined to get the best possible seats for himself, Bobby, and Luanne at an upcoming Brownsville Station concert. Guest stars: Paul Teutul Sr., Paul Teutul Jr., and Michael Teutul as themselves
197	11	"Church Hopping"	Robin Brigstocke	Jim Dauterive	April 9, 2006	9ABE22	4.47
When the Hill family finds out that their pew of many years has been given away to another family at church, they leave and join a new megachurch. Bobby and Peggy enjoy it, but Hank begins to miss his old church. Guest star: Big Boi as Reverend Nealy
198	12	"24 Hour Propane People"	Robin Brigstocke	Aron Abrams & Gregory Thompson	April 23, 2006	AABE01	3.66
Buck Strickland is banned from his best friend's club after they have an argument, and after spending his days at a gimmicky, Coldstone Creamery-esque ice cream parlor, decides to make his workplace a fun place to live so that he will enjoy being there.
199	13	"The Texas Panhandler"	Ronald Rubio & Ken Wong	Tony Gama-Lobo & Rebecca May	April 30, 2006	AABE02	5.70
When Hank refuses to buy Bobby designer faded jeans, Bobby gets a job as a sign spinner -- but quits when he realizes that he can get more money by begging on the street. Guest Stars: Dax Shepard as Derek, Justin Long as Adam and Andrea Bowen as Sandy
200	14	"Hank's Bully"	Kyounghee Lim	J.B. Cook	May 7, 2006	AABE03	4.99
Hank gets bullied by a boy named Caleb, whose parents seem fine with their son pushing around an adult. Meanwhile, Dale and Peggy enter a taxidermy competition. Guest Stars: Paul Butcher as Caleb, Ricki Lake as Lila
201	15	"Edu-macating Lucky"	Adam Kuhlman	Sivert Glarum & Michael Jamin	May 14, 2006	AABE04	5.15
When Lucky asks Peggy to help him get his GED in the hopes of improving his chances of marrying Luanne, Peggy must choose between teaching him the right answers and making him pass or misinforming him so he fails. She chooses the latter, but a surprising announcement from Luanne and an equally surprising insistence on his own merits from Lucky cause a crisis that Peggy has to fix immediately.
