= Ashley Gardner =

American actress

- Occupation: Actress
- Years active: 1989–present

Ashley Gardner is an American actress. She provides the voices of Nancy Gribble and Didi Hill in the animated series King of the Hill.

== Career ==
She appeared in the sitcom Seinfeld in the episode "The Library" as Marion and in the pilot of Madman of the People.

John Simon, in his review of Keith Curran's 1991 play Walking the Dead, stated that Gardner "does wonders" as Veronica, a lesbian who has a sex change and becomes a man. She had previously appeared in Curran's Dalton's Back and co-starred in Timothy Mason's The Fiery Furnace.

Gardner has also appeared in the feature films Heart of Dixie (1989), Johnny Suede (1991) and He Said, She Said (1991) where she plays the "Classy with a capital K" ex-lover of Kevin Bacon's character who flirts by exposing her breast for him in public.

== Filmography ==
=== Film ===
Year	Title	Role	Notes
1989	Heart of Dixie	Jean	
1991	He Said, She Said	Susan	
1991	Johnny Suede	Ellen	
1993	Complex of Fear	Doreen Wylie	Television film
1993	Lies and Lullabies	Fran	Television film
1997	Breast Men	Paula	Television film
2000	The Mystery of Spoon River	Jeannie Manson	
2002	Fits and Starts	Jolene	
2006	Lost Signal	Martha Harris	
2007	Sunny & Share Love You	Sean's Mom	
2011	I.E.D., I.O.U.	Mrs. Batten	Short film
2014	Parallax	Rachel Cooper	Short film
2015	Chasing Eagle Rock	—N/a	
2022	Beavis and Butt-Head Do the Universe	Antia Ross (voice)	

=== Television ===
Year	Title	Role	Notes
1991	Seinfeld	Marion	Episode: "The Library"
1992	Parker Lewis Can't Lose	Eve	Episode: "Goodbye Mr. Rips"
1994	Madman of the People	Caroline	2 episodes
1994	The George Carlin Show	Dot	Episode: "George Gets Hoist by His Own Petard"
1995	Maybe This Time	Sherry	Episode: "Maybe This Time"
1995	Murder One	Marcy Ballard	Episode: "Chapter Four"
1995–1996	Grace Under Fire	Evie Burdette	2 episodes
1996	Nash Bridges	Sophia Kidwell	Episode: "The Great Escape"
1997	Beyond Belief: Fact or Fiction	Partrica Kelly	2 episodes
1997	NYPD Blue	Denise	Episode: "Three Girls and a Baby"
1997	Brooklyn South	Bonnie Van Eggidy	Episode: "A Reverend Runs Through It"
1997–2010, 2025–present	King of the Hill	Nancy Gribble, Didi Hill, Reverend Karen Stroup (voices)	Main role
1998	Michael Hayes	—N/a	Episode: "Imagine: Part 2"
1998	The Drew Carey Show	Pinky	3 episodes
1998	The Larry Sanders Show	Fran Schmitt	Episode: "Beverly's Secret"
1998	Style & Substance	Felicia	Episode: "Office Management for Beginners"
1999	Becker	Susan Fox	Episode: "Partial Law"
1999	Everything's Relative	Gail	2 episodes
1999	Ally McBeal	Martha Claven	Episode: "Only the Lonely"
1999	Judging Amy	Mimi Carter	Episode: "Near Death Experience"
2000	Just Shoot Me!	Lori	Episode: "With Three I Swing"
2001	Spin City	Judith	Episode: "Hey Judith"
2002	The Ellen Show	Hostess	Episode: "Just the Duck"
2002	Charmed	Tyler's Foster Mother	Episode: "Lost and Bound"
2002	Watching Ellie	Monica	Episode: "Zimmerman"
2002	Six Feet Under	Daughter #1	Episode: "Someone Else's Eyes"
2002	ER	Simone Phillips	Episode: "A Hopeless Wound"
2003	Strong Medicine	Nina	Episode: "Coming Clean"
2005	Malcolm in the Middle	Wendy	Episode: "Billboard"
2006	Close to Home	Psychologist	Episode: "Dead or Alive"
2007	Raines	Wendy Tucker	Episode: "Pilot"
2007	Reno 911!	Angry Teacher	Episode: "Proposition C"
2011	Beavis and Butt-Head	Additional voices	Episode: Drones"
2014	Nicky, Ricky, Dicky & Dawn	Cafeteria Lady	Episode: "I Got Your Back"
2016	Lopez	Bobbie	Episode: "George's Party"
2017	Tarantula	Unknown role (voice)	Episode: "The Shade"
2019	WTF 101	Baroness (voice)	Episode: "Duels"

=== Video games ===
Year	Title	Role	Notes
2000	King of the Hill	Nancy Gribble	
