= King of the Hill season 11 =

King of the Hill
- Season 11
- DVD cover
- Showrunners: John Altschuler; Dave Krinsky
- Starring: Mike Judge; Kathy Najimy; Pamela Adlon; Brittany Murphy; Johnny Hardwick; Stephen Root; Toby Huss
- No. of episodes: 12

Release
- Original network: Fox
- Original release: January 28 – May 20, 2007

Season chronology
- ← Previous; Season 10 Next → Season 12

The eleventh season of King of the Hill originally aired Sundays at 8:30–9:00 p.m. (EST) and 7:30–8:00 p.m. (EST) on the Fox Broadcasting Company from January 28 to May 20, 2007.

== Production ==
The showrunners for the season were John Altschuler and Dave Krinsky.

== Episodes ==
No. overall	No. in season	Title	Directed by	Written by	Original release date	Prod. code	U.S. viewers (millions)
202	1	"The Peggy Horror Picture Show"	Kyounghee Lim	Christy Stratton	January 28, 2007	BABE02	7.27
Peggy, feeling a bit unfeminine because of her masculine clothes and size-16 feet, befriends Carolyn, who views Peggy as the epitome of womanhood. Hank is thrilled that Peggy finally has someone else to talk to about her girl problems, but discovers that Carolyn is a drag queen who thinks Peggy is one too. Meanwhile, Bobby tries to play pranks on people using a joke book, but every prank turns into someone else's good fortune.
203	2	"SerPUNt"	Robin Brigstocke	Greg Cohen	February 11, 2007	BABE01	6.99
Bobby gets a pet python from Lucky, and its slithering into the toilet prompts two animal control workers to blow the situation into citywide panic so they can get paid more. Guest Stars: John Goodman as Tommy
204	3	"Blood and Sauce"	Tricia Garcia	Dan McGrath	February 18, 2007	BABE03	7.19
Bill is conflicted between keeping his family legacy alive and selling out when his effeminate cousin, Gilbert (last seen on "A Beer Can Named Desire"), arrives to tell him that everyone in the Dauterive family is either dead, has gone insane, is incapable of getting pregnant, or not blood-related and tries to stop him from selling his family's barbecue sauce recipe to Mr. Strickland to save what little legacy they have left.
205	4	"Luanne Gets Lucky"	Ken Wong	Jonathan Collier	March 25, 2007	BABE04	6.08
Lucky neglects Luanne when he becomes obsessed with retrieving a walnut tree stump his grandfather found, so Luanne accepts a 15-year-old's invitation to the senior prom (as her abusive parents kept her from going to the prom when she was a teenager). Guest Stars: Jack DeSena as Kevin and Trace Adkins as Mud Dobber
206	5	"Hank Gets Dusted"	Michael Loya	Kit Boss	April 1, 2007	BABE05	6.39
Hank is devastated when Cotton's Cadillac is given to Hank's cousin, ZZ Top bassist Dusty Hill. When Dusty and his bandmates arrive at Hank's house to play practical jokes for a reality show, it is more than Hank can bear. Guest Stars: Dusty Hill as himself, Billy Gibbons as himself, Frank Beard as himself and Will Arnett as Portis
207	6	"Glen Peggy Glen Ross"	Tony Kluck	Jim Dauterive	April 22, 2007	BABE06	3.34
Peggy is fired from The Arlen Bystander after doing negative piece on a local real estate agency. The head of the agency, impressed by her audacity, hires her as a real estate agent. This does not sit well with Connie, who has to shadow Peggy as part of a college-prep summer school assignment. Meanwhile, after Dale buys a set of titanium golf clubs at a police auction, he gives the clubs to Hank, who does not want them after learning they were used as a murder weapon.
208	7	"The Passion of Dauterive"	Anthony Chun	Tony Gama-Lobo & Rebecca May	April 29, 2007	BABE07	3.51
Bill searches for meaning in his life after surviving a roof collapse, leading to a relationship with Reverend Stroup.
209	8	"Grand Theft Arlen"	Ronald Rubio	Sanjay Shah	April 29, 2007	BABE08	4.14
Hank protests against a new school program that lets failing gym students play video games -- and becomes addicted to Pro-Pain, a Grand Theft Auto knockoff centered on propane and featuring Hank as the protagonist. Meanwhile, Bobby trains for the Presidential Physical Fitness Test.
210	9	"Peggy's Gone to Pots"	Robin Brigstocke	Paul Corrigan & Brad Walsh	May 6, 2007	BABE09	4.19
Peggy's attempts at selling houses in the gated community Arlen Heights lands her in trouble with a scam kitchen supply company after Peggy unwittingly takes Ted Wassanasong's wife's place as a saleslady. Meanwhile, Dale encounters the man whose name he's been using as an alias for years (Rusty Shackleford). Guest Stars: Peri Gilpin as Judy
211	10	"Hair Today, Gone Tomorrow"	Kyounghee Lim	Christy Stratton	May 13, 2007	BABE10	3.68
Nancy turns to her mother for help when the stress of home life and unresolved feelings for John Redcorn cause her to lose her hair. Meanwhile, Dale takes a ride with Kahn's delinquent nephew in a souped-up racecar during the vernal equinox and thinks he has traveled through time. Guest Stars: Rue McClanahan as Bunny Hicks
212	11	"Bill, Bulk and the Body Buddies"	Tricia Garcia	Blake McCormick	May 20, 2007	BABE11	4.05
Bill meets a bodybuilder named Dirk who agrees to help him train for an upcoming Army physical, but when Bill starts working out with Dirk and his two meathead buddies, Bill develops great muscle tone and a bad attitude that alienates his former friends. Guest Stars: Diedrich Bader as Dirk and "Macho Man" Randy Savage as Gorilla
213	12	"Lucky's Wedding Suit"	Julius Wu	Jim Dauterive	May 20, 2007	AABE05	5.22
When Lucky wants to give Luanne the expensive wedding that she desires, he slaps Dale with a frivolous lawsuit after having an accident on the job. This episode was originally planned to be the series finale.
