= My Own Private Rodeo =

- King of the Hill episode
- Dale and his father Bug tearfully reconcile after a 20-year estrangement.
- Episode no.: Season 6 Episode 18
- Directed by: Cyndi Tang-Loveland
- Written by: Alex Gregory & Peter Huyck
- Production code: 6ABE16
- Original air date: April 28, 2002

Guest appearance
- David Herman as Bug Gribble

Episode chronology
← Previous "Fun with Jane and Jane"	Next → "Sug Night"
- King of the Hill season 6

"My Own Private Rodeo" is the 18th episode of the sixth season of the American animated television series King of the Hill, and the 122nd episode overall. Written by Alex Gregory and Peter Huyck and directed by Cyndi Tang-Loveland, it originally aired on the Fox network in the United States on April 28, 2002. It was a nominee for the GLAAD Media Awards for "Outstanding Individual Episode (In a Series Without a Regular Gay Character)" and by the Writers Guild of America Award for Animation.

== Plot ==
Dale and Nancy Gribble are planning on renewing their wedding vows. Nancy has recently ended her affair with John Redcorn and hopes to use the ceremony as a fresh start; she hopes Dale will invite his father Bug, from whom he has been estranged since he forcibly kissed Nancy at their wedding reception. Hank, Bill, and Boomhauer decide to track Bug down in order to help him make amends with his son, finding him at a gay rodeo. After the show, Hank goes to Bug, who reveals the truth: twenty years ago, he was still closeted, and he kissed Nancy to avoid appearing attracted to a man. The conversation is interrupted by Juan Pedro, Bug's lover, who is upset upon learning that Bug had a son and did not tell him.

Eventually, Bug returns to Arlen and asks for Dale's forgiveness, without telling Dale he is gay. Dale reconciles with his father but is completely oblivious to his homosexuality. Bug notices Joseph's lack of resemblance to Dale or Nancy and asks if Joseph is "adopted". She reluctantly admits that his true father is John Redcorn, but is no more willing to admit the truth than Bug is willing to admit to Dale that he is gay. Bug finally decides to admit the truth.

Dale's explanation of Juan Pedro being his "partner" and working with him at a gay rodeo are misconstrued by Dale as his father being a government agent, which breaks his heart once again. Dale deserts the renewal ceremony and heads to the gay rodeo, intending to blow his father's cover. After Dale sees Bug at the rodeo, he informs his father that he knows he's a government agent and that he will let everybody at the event know. Bug then says there has been a terrible misunderstanding and that he is gay. Still not trusting Bug, Dale then goes into the rodeo pen and announces that Bug is spying on them and Bug ties him down. After a struggle, Bug finally makes up with Juan Pedro and kisses him in front of Dale, who relents and lets them attend the ceremony.

As they dance together at the reception, Nancy asks Dale if he's really OK with his father's sexuality. Dale asserts that it's a non-issue since he believes John Redcorn is gay and has been friends with him for years.

== Production ==
Charles Nelson Reilly voiced the part of Bug in the original storyline. In this version, Dale suffers from a toothache and refuses to go to a dentist, fearing a tracking device would be implanted in him by his father's cohorts. Most of the episode's events, like Hank going to the rodeo, remain the same, but the ending is different in that Bug, feeling Dale would reject him if he told the truth, covers his sexuality by explaining he is monitoring the gay rodeo's activities. Relieved, Dale has his father hold his hand while he goes to the dentist. After the script was re-written, David Herman was hired to do Bug's voice.
