= The Springfield Files =

- The Simpsons episode
- Promotional artwork for the episode featuring Mulder (right) and Scully (left) along with Homer.
- Episode no.: Season 8 Episode 10
- Directed by: Steven Dean Moore
- Written by: Reid Harrison
- Production codes: 3F25; 3G01
- Original air date: January 12, 1997

Guest appearances
- Leonard Nimoy as himself; David Duchovny as Fox Mulder; Gillian Anderson as Dana Scully

Episode features
- Chalkboard gag: "The truth is not out there"
- Couch gag: The Simpsons fly into the living room and onto the couch on jet packs.
- Commentary: Matt Groening; Al Jean; Mike Reiss; Reid Harrison; Steven Dean Moore; David Silverman

Episode chronology
← Previous "El Viaje Misterioso de Nuestro Jomer (The Mysterious Voyage of Homer)"	Next → "The Twisted World of Marge Simpson"
- The Simpsons season 8

"The Springfield Files" is the tenth episode of the eighth season of the American animated television series The Simpsons. It originally aired on the Fox network in the United States on January 12, 1997. In the episode, Homer believes he has discovered an alien in Springfield. It was written by Reid Harrison and directed by Steven Dean Moore. Leonard Nimoy guest stars as himself and David Duchovny and Gillian Anderson guest star as agents Fox Mulder and Dana Scully, their respective characters on The X-Files. The episode serves as a crossover with The X-Files and features numerous references to the series. The story came from former showrunners Al Jean and Mike Reiss, who returned to produce this episode while under contract with The Walt Disney Company. It received positive reviews from critics; Jean and Reiss won an Annie Award for producing it.

== Plot ==
In a framing story, Leonard Nimoy is hosting a program about alien encounters, and begins the episode by talking about an "encounter" that occurred in Springfield.

Homer tells Lenny and Carl that they should sneak out of work early and start drinking beer. Homer puts in an old tape of them working into the security camera. That night at Moe's, after drinking over ten beers, a drunken Homer is forced to walk home after failing a breathalyzer test, but takes a wrong path and ends up in the woods. In a clearing, he encounters a glowing, thin-boned figure with wide open eyes. Although it tells him, "Don't be afraid," Homer panics and runs home screaming.

The rest of the family do not believe Homer's story, and his attempts to report his sighting of the figure (which he identifies as an alien) to the police are dismissed by Chief Wiggum. Agents Fox Mulder and Dana Scully of the FBI hear of the sighting and go to investigate. After receiving no results from their psychological tests of him, Homer fails to provide any proof that he actually saw an alien. Homer is ridiculed by most of the neighborhood; even Marge refuses to believe in his claims, but Bart admits that he believes Homer. The next Friday night, the pair camp out in the forest. The mysterious figure arrives and promises peace, but Homer scares it away when he accidentally steps on their campfire and screams in pain. Bart captures the entire incident on tape.

Nimoy bids the audience goodnight. He is then reminded that the show still has ten minutes left by an off-screen Squeaky-Voiced Teen, at which point he runs to his car and leaves. The Squeaky-Voiced Teen takes over narrating duties.

Following the successful capture of the figure's existence, Homer and Bart present it to the media. Everyone in town finally believes Homer, even knocking on his door and asking Homer questions. During a church lecture, Reverend Lovejoy gets emotional talking about the character E.T. Meanwhile, Lisa maintains that there must be a logical explanation for it. Friday comes again and everyone (including Nimoy) goes to the forest. The figure appears, promising love, but the townspeople begin to riot, and charge at it. Lisa and Smithers stop them just in time, showing that the "alien" is actually Mr. Burns. Smithers explains that Burns receives longevity treatment once a week in order to cheat death; this includes intense chiropractic, administering eye drops and painkillers, as well as a vocal cord scraping. The ordeal leaves Burns in a state of disorientation, and with a soft, high-pitched voice. Back to his normal self, Burns reveals that his "healthy" green glow is due to many years of working in his nuclear plant (which has also left him impotent). After threatening to bring "fear, famine [and] pestilence" instead of peace and love to the people of Springfield, he is given another booster injection from Dr. Nick. Reverting to his "alien" self, he begins to sing "Good Morning Starshine", with the entire crowd, including Nimoy, and a returned Mulder and Scully (who is wearing a "Homer is a dope" t-shirt), joining in.

The Squeaky-Voiced Teen closes the episode by reminding the viewers to "keep watching the skis... uh, skies."

== Production ==
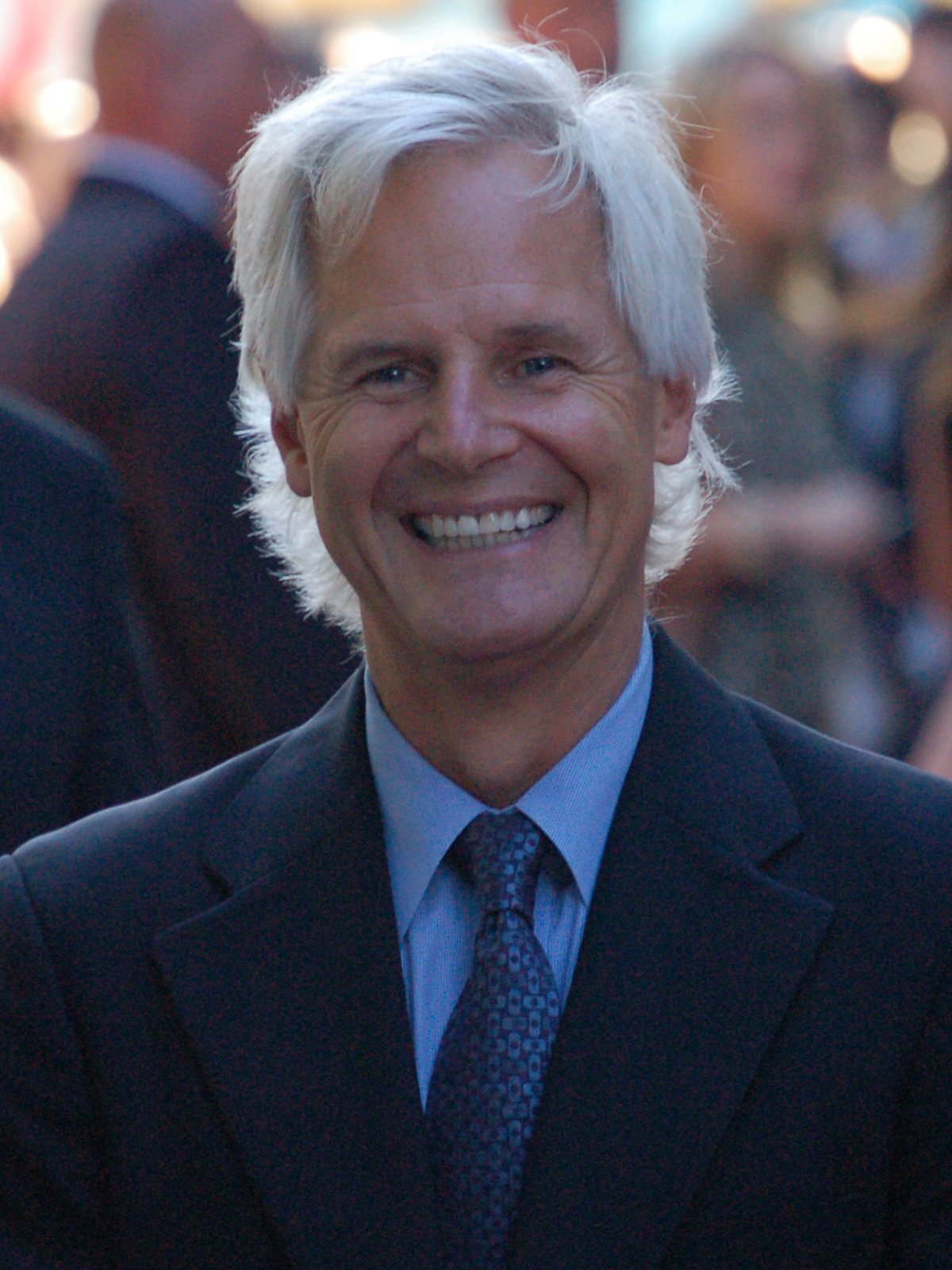
Chris Carter, creator of The X-Files, called it an "honor" for his show to be satirized in the episode.

The episode was produced by Al Jean and Mike Reiss, who had served as showrunners of seasons three and four. They returned to the show to produce this and several other episodes while under contract with The Walt Disney Company. The episode was written by Reid Harrison and directed by Steven Dean Moore. It had one of the longest episode gaps between its conception to the time it was finished. The idea was first conceived at a story retreat. Jean found a copy of TV Guide while in the bathroom, with The X-Files on the cover. Feeling a crossover would be a good idea, he came back into the room, told Reiss his idea, and the pair pitched it. None of the other staff wanted to do it, so Reiss and Jean decided to do it themselves. Before the episode was produced, the script was sent to Chris Carter, the creator of The X-Files, who said that it was an "honor" to be satirized by The Simpsons. Jean was worried that the episode was not funny, as at the table reading there were only a few of the writers present and as such, the script got no laughs at all. It took a long time to come up with an ending, and an explanation for the alien. Originally, it was just going to be left as a mystery. Mulder and Scully's office was designed to be exactly the same as the one used in The X-Files. After it had been finished, Fox sent the episode out for a critical review, which was "really great". The scene with the "Homer is a dope" T-shirts originally had an extra line: "I told you, we're sold out!", thus filling in the plot error in the actual episode in which Homer asks for some T-shirts, despite just being told that they were sold out. The scene after Homer's first encounter with the alien, in which he runs through a field writing "Yahhh!" in the grass, was written by David M. Stern, and added in after the original read-through.

== Cultural references ==
- The Nimoy segments are a send-up of the paranormal documentary series In Search of..., which Nimoy hosted.
- In addition to the appearances of Mulder and Scully, the episode features several other references to The X-Files.
  - Mulder's FBI badge has a picture of himself only wearing a speedo; this is a reference to a scene in The X-Files episode "Duane Barry", in which Duchovny wore just a speedo.
  - In the scene where Scully gives Homer a lie detector test, The Smoking Man is in the background.
  - When Homer sees the alien, The X-Files theme is played.
- The Budweiser Frogs appear in the swamp, chanting their names, "Bud... Weis... Er." They are then eaten by an alligator who growls "Coors!".
- J. Edgar Hoover is wearing a dress in the photo in the X-files office, a reference to his transvestism.
- The scales in the breathalyzer test Homer takes are Tipsy, Soused, Stinkin' and Boris Yeltsin.
- Homer's suggestion that he and Bart fake an alien encounter and sell it to the Fox network is an allusion to the Alien Autopsy hoax.
- As Homer recounts his experience to Chief Wiggum, he recalls the alien having a sweet, heavenly voice and appearing every Friday night "like Urkel", from the ABC/CBS sitcom Family Matters.

There are also numerous film references.

The FBI line-up was described by Al Jean as the "most illegal shot" in the show's history, as the writers did not seek permission to use any of the characters (excluding their own Kang/Kodos).

- Marvin the Martian, Gort, Chewbacca, ALF, and either Kang or Kodos comprise the FBI line-up.
- The narration sequences are based on the 1959 Ed Wood film Plan 9 from Outer Space.
- The music played by the Springfield Philharmonic comes from the 1960 Alfred Hitchcock film Psycho.
- In one chapter title, the phrase "All work and no play makes Jack a dull boy" being printed out ad infinitum is a reference to the 1980 film The Shining.
- Mr. Largo conducts five of his students in playing the famous five-note tones from Close Encounters of the Third Kind.
- Jimbo Jones is seen displaying a sign that reads "Alien dude: Need two tickets to Pearl Jam", a reference to Close Encounters of the Third Kind.
- Milhouse plays a Kevin Costner's Waterworld arcade game, in which he needs to insert forty quarters for each credit played (losing his first credit after taking a few steps), a reference to the budget overrun on Kevin Costner's 1995 film Waterworld.
- Homer explains that he got the idea of looping security camera footage from "a movie about a bus that had to speed around the city, keeping its speed over 50, and if its speed dropped, it would explode". Although this is a reference to the 1994 action film Speed, Homer mistakenly believes the film is called The Bus That Couldn't Slow Down.
- The Squeaky-Voiced Teen's ending comment to "Keep watching the skis... uh, skies," is a reference to the final line of dialogue from the 1951 film The Thing from Another World.

== Reception ==
In its original broadcast, "The Springfield Files" finished 26th in ratings for the week of January 6–12, 1997, with a Nielsen rating of 11.7, equivalent to approximately 11.3 million viewing households. It was the third-highest-rated show on the Fox network that week, following The X-Files and the series premiere of King of the Hill, which aired immediately after the episode. On the original airing of the episode, Fox played an audio promotion with King of the Hill's main character Hank Hill talking over the credits, naming a list of things which will never be seen on his show. This was not official audio for the episode.

Al Jean and Mike Reiss won the Annie Award for Best Individual Achievement: Producing in a TV Production for their work on the episode.

The authors of the book I Can't Believe It's a Bigger and Better Updated Unofficial Simpsons Guide, Gary Russell and Gareth Roberts, said that it was "a very clever episode, with the line-up one of the best visual gags in ages".

Skeptical Inquirer reviewed the episode positively, stating that "It's rare that a popular, prime-time network television show turns out to be a "slam dunk" for skeptics." Critic Chris Knight speculated that if The X-Files is one day forgotten, those who see this episode will probably still appreciate the scene with ALF, Chewbacca, and Marvin the Martian.

IGN ranked Leonard Nimoy's performance in this episode, and "Marge vs. the Monorail", as the 11th-best guest appearance in the show's history. Total Film's Nathan Ditum ranked Duchovny and Anderson's performances as the fourth-best guest appearances in the show's history.

In 2017, British site Digital Spy ranked it 15th on their list of "The 29 all-time greatest Simpsons episodes ever", while in 2019 Australian publication Junkee placed it seventh on their list of the 30 best episodes of The Simpsons. In 2021, Variety also placed it seventh on their list of the 30 best episodes. It is currently the 7th highest rated episode of The Simpsons on IMDb, with a 9.1 rating.
