= King of the Hill season 9 =

King of the Hill
- Season 9
- DVD cover
- Showrunners: John Altschuler; Dave Krinsky
- Starring: Mike Judge; Kathy Najimy; Pamela Adlon; Brittany Murphy; Johnny Hardwick; Stephen Root; Toby Huss
- No. of episodes: 15

Release
- Original network: Fox
- Original release: November 7, 2004 – May 15, 2005

Season chronology
- ← Previous; Season 8 Next → Season 10

The ninth season of King of the Hill originally aired Sundays at 7:00–7:30 p.m. (EST) on the Fox Broadcasting Company from November 7, 2004 to May 15, 2005.

== Production ==
The showrunners for the season were John Altschuler and Dave Krinsky. This was the first season to air after the premiere of the American version of The Office, by co-creator Greg Daniels, which led to him becoming even less involved with the show.

== Episodes ==
No. overall	No. in season	Title	Directed by	Written by	Original release date	Prod. code	U.S. viewers (millions)
172	1	"A Rover Runs Through It"	Tricia Garcia	Dan Sterling	November 7, 2004	8ABE22	6.84
The Hills travel to Montana to visit Peggy's mother. There, they find out the family is losing the ranch to Henry Winkler (guest starring as himself) because of high property taxes.
173	2	"Ms. Wakefield"	Allan Jacobsen	J.B. Cook	December 19, 2004	9ABE05	4.46
When an elderly stranger, Ms. Wakefield (Marion Ross), visits the Hill residence during Christmas, Hank is thrilled to show her his house since it was also her childhood home. However, when Ms. Wakefield announces that she wants to die in their house, Hank and Peggy become shocked and get angry when all the neighbors insist that the Hills grant Ms. Wakefield her last wish.
174	3	"Death Buys a Timeshare"	Kyounghee Lim & Boohwan Lim	Etan Cohen	January 16, 2005	8ABE18	4.38
Cotton inherits $10,000 from the will of his friend Topsy, and goes to Mexico, with Bill in tow, to buy a timeshare. Feeling lonely after the death of his friend, Cotton gets suckered in by tales of the timeshare development's owner, O'Kelly, and decides to buy—even though Americans cannot own land in Mexico. Meanwhile during a heatwave in Arlen, Peggy, Bobby, and Dale search for a pool to swim in.
175	4	"Yard, She Blows!"	Allan Jacobsen	Sivert Glarum & Michael Jamin	January 23, 2005	8ABE19	5.24
Peggy is jealous that Hank always gets complimented on his yard, so she starts a garden in the front yard. When that plan fails, she puts Winklebottom the garden gnome in their front yard, which drives Hank insane. When Bobby accidentally breaks off Winklebottom's ear, Hank promises to fix it but secretly destroys it instead. However, when Peggy blames Bobby for Winklebottom disappearing, Hank feels guilty and replaces Winklebottom with a new gnome. Guest Stars: Beth Grant as the old lady in the gnome store
176	5	"Dale to the Chief"	Anthony Lioi	Garland Testa	January 30, 2005	9ABE02	5.21
When Dale reads Joseph the Warren Commission Report, he notices the absence of a discrepancy in the positioning of the local landmarks, decides that the U.S. government must be right about who assassinated John F. Kennedy (and thus, their official version of every story he had previously written off as part of some conspiracy is in fact completely factual) and goes from government-hating conspiracy theorist to government-loving super-patriot. Meanwhile, Hank discovers a mistake on his driver's license and is sent through a boatload of red tape in order to fix it—a task made all the more onerous when Dale reports Hank as a threat to America's national security, though Dale also provides the key to resolving the problem.
177	6	"The Petriot Act"	Robin Brigstocke	Christy Stratton	February 13, 2005	9ABE06	4.69
When Hank agrees to take in a soldier's pet, he gets stuck with a vicious aging beast of a cat named Duke. Hank takes Duke to visit Dr. Leslie (Jason Bateman), a veterinarian who runs a battery of tests and presents Hank with a vacation-ruining bill for several thousand dollars. Hank has to find a way to cut off Dr. Leslie and a tip from a nicer veterinarian allows him to do so.
178	7	"Enrique-cilable Differences"	Dominic Polcino	Greg Cohen	February 20, 2005	9ABE12	6.06
Hank's co-worker Enrique (Danny Trejo) is having marital problems and starts spending all his time with Hank, who only makes things worse when he tries to fix Enrique's marriage. Meanwhile, Bobby tries to unblock the Fox network from the Hills' TV in order to watch the Daytona 500, in which he succeeds, only to block it again when he discovers the show is not what he expected.
179	8	"Mutual of Omabwah"	Dominic Polcino	Tony Gama-Lobo & Rebecca May	March 6, 2005	9ABE03	4.48
When Hank forgets to mail his insurance payment, Hank and Bobby must protect themselves from any accidents until their insurance can be re-activated in 36 hours. Meanwhile, Dale decides to raise bees, Bill and Boomhauer discover the joys of deep-frying, and Peggy and Luanne get stuck at a rest stop when Hank asks them not to drive uninsured.
180	9	"Care-Takin' Care of Business"	Cyndi Tang-Loveland	Dan McGrath	March 13, 2005	9ABE01	5.42
When the Tom Landry Middle School football team has to forfeit a game due to poor field maintenance when the caretaker goes senile, the booster club resolves to replace the school's elderly groundskeeper, Smitty (Christopher Lloyd), and Hank resolves to help him keep his job by secretly doing upkeep on the field. Meanwhile, Luanne starts dating a redneck named Lucky (Tom Petty) (first seen in "The Redneck on Rainey Street"), much to Peggy's dismay.
181	10	"Arlen City Bomber"	Kyounghee Lim	Jonathan Collier	March 27, 2005	9ABE07	3.77
To pay off her credit card debts, Luanne signs up to be a roller derby girl. Peggy gets in on it too and uses borrowed money to make improvements on the team, sinking both Luanne and Peggy deeper into debt. Meanwhile, Lucky (Tom Petty) comes up with a plan to have Bobby eat a potato chip off the assembly line. Other Guest Stars: Glenn Morshower as Lance and Neil Flynn as the Derby Representative
182	11	"Redcorn Gambles with His Future"	Matt Engstrom	Etan Cohen	April 10, 2005	9ABE09	3.87
Hank is in charge of organizing the Strickland Family Fun Day. Meanwhile, John Redcorn and his band "Big Mountain Fudgecake" are having trouble finding a venue to play their music. Acting on Hank's advice, John Redcorn uses his land to open a casino so his band can have a place to play.
183	12	"Smoking and the Bandit"	Cyndi Tang-Loveland	Dan McGrath	April 17, 2005	9ABE10	4.21
When Arlen bans smoking in all restaurants and bars, Dale becomes the rebellious "Smoking Bandit" to impress Joseph. Meanwhile, Peggy decides to tail the "Bandit" and unmask him. Note: Originally, the episode "Bill's House" was meant to air before being switched with this episode a few days later. This results in an error in continuity since Peggy is seen working at the Arlen Bystander in this episode, even though she doesn't start until the Season 10 episode "Bystand Me" (8ABE21). Tone Lōc guest stars.
184	13	"Gone with the Windstorm"	Yvette Kaplan	Wyatt Cenac	May 1, 2005	9ABE08	5.71
When Channel 84 hires a new meteorologist, Irv Bennett (Brendan Fraser), Nancy and her less-than-accurate weather reports are left out in the cold -- and the only way back to being hot is for Nancy to cover news of a forest fire. Meanwhile, Bobby tries to fight back against a bully who springs out and scares his victims. Note: This is the first episode to be part of Fox's Animation Domination block.
185	14	"Bobby on Track"	Tricia Garcia	Aron Abrams & Gregory Thompson	May 8, 2005	9ABE13	4.85
Upset with Bobby's habit of giving up what he starts (after Bobby does not complete the miles needed to run for a charity race), Hank puts Bobby on the school's track team but soon learns that the coach only wants Bobby as a "Stick" so he can push the other team members to do better.
186	15	"It Ain't Over 'til the Fat Neighbor Sings"	Julius Wu	Etan Cohen	May 15, 2005	9ABE19	4.51
Bill joins an all-male chorus (based on a real Dallas-based men's chorus called The Vocal Majority) who end up using Bill and forcing him to blow off his appointment to cut the general's hair at the Army base. Meanwhile, Peggy and Bobby get caught up in a game of Pong after Bobby finds her old Atari console in the closet. Guest stars: Stephen Yardley as General Murray.
