= Pilot (King of the Hill) =

- King of the Hill episode
- Episode no.: Season 1 Episode 1
- Directed by: Wes Archer
- Written by: Mike Judge; Greg Daniels
- Production code: 4E01
- Original air date: January 12, 1997

Guest appearance
- Gailard Sartain as Case Manager

Episode chronology
| ← Previous — | Next → "Square Peg" |
- King of the Hill season 1

Pilot is the pilot episode and series premiere of the Fox animated comedy King of the Hill. The episode originally aired on the Fox network on January 12, 1997 prior to an episode of The Simpsons and an episode of The X-Files, and introduced many of the show's main characters, including the main character Hank Hill and his life in a fictional Texas town known as Arlen.

In this episode, Hank hopes that his son Bobby Hill will give 110% effort in a Little League baseball game. After his neighbors gossip at the Mega Lo Mart about how Hank treats his son, he gets a call from Anthony Page, a social worker from the Child Protective Services Office and his incident is placed under investigation.

== Plot ==
Bobby Hill, his mom, Peggy, and dad, Hank, drive to a Little League baseball game. Along the way, Hank gives Bobby a pep talk, emphasizing the importance of winning. As the game gets underway, Bobby, who shows little athletic prowess, manages to get on first base but becomes distracted when his father offers coaching advice from the bleachers. A ball roars down the first base line and strikes Bobby in the face, leaving him with a black eye. After the game, Bobby accompanies Hank to the Mega Lo Mart. Two older women spot the pair from an aisle, as Hank becomes increasingly frustrated with one of the employees when he is unable to be directed to the hardware department, and the women erroneously pass on rumors that Bobby is being abused. Word spreads throughout the community, and eventually, a social worker named Anthony Page is dispatched to investigate the incident.

Page arrives at the Hill home just as Hank walks in angry (after hurting his arm and having the truck hood slam down on his head). As Page interviews Hank, Peggy assures Page that her husband is as gentle as a lamb and Hank tells the social worker that his son received the black eye during a baseball game. He also emphatically denies ever hitting his son, and forces Page to leave. Meanwhile, Page remains unconvinced and begins interviewing neighbors and friends of the family, hoping to uncover the "truth."

Back at the Child Protective Services Office, Page discusses his findings with the case manager. Through this, Page, a Los Angeles native, comments that the neighborhood is "redneck city" and that a boy like Bobby shouldn't be living there. However, Page is dropped from the case when it's revealed that he never talked with Harvey, the baseball coach who is friends with Page's boss, which would have cleared Hank's name. Bobby then intercepts a phone call from the Protective Services Office, stating that Page has been fired and the investigation has been called off, but Bobby brushes it off as a wrong number and plots to play destructive pranks so Hank can never discipline him, since it will mean Bobby will be taken away by the government.

Eventually, Peggy learns that the investigation was halted a week earlier and that Bobby deliberately neglected to tell anyone the truth. When she confronts Bobby, he admits that he is doing it because he doesn't believe Hank loves him. Peggy tells Hank about the misunderstanding, which gets him mad. Peggy tells Hank why Bobby lied and to let him know that he loves him, but Hank has trouble saying that because of his upbringing with his father. Later, Hank tells Bobby in his own unique way how much he loves him, and starts to playfully throw punches with him, which Page (who has been put back on a bus to Los Angeles) mistakes for abuse yet again, only to be told to shut up by a man sitting next to him.

== Production ==
The pitch was conceived for Fox by Mike Judge during his time with his other series, Beavis and Butt-Head on MTV. Judge conceived the idea for the show, drew the main characters, and wrote a pilot script on a small Texas town based on an amalgamation of Dallas suburbs, including Garland, where he had lived, and Richardson. However, the network was uncertain of the viability of Judge's concept for an animated comedy based in reality and set in the American South, so the network recommended him Greg Daniels, an experienced primetime TV writer who had previously worked on The Simpsons.

Daniels rewrote the pilot script and created important characters who did not appear in Judge's first draft, including Luanne and Cotton. Daniels also reworked some of the supporting characters (whom the pair characterized as originally having been generic, "snaggle-toothed hillbillies"), such as making Dale Gribble a conspiracy theorist. While Judge's writing tended to emphasize political humor, specifically the clash of Hank Hill's social conservatism and interlopers' liberalism, Daniels focused on character development to provide an emotional context for the series' numerous cultural conflicts. Judge was ultimately so pleased with Daniels' contributions, he chose to credit him as a co-creator, rather than give him the "developer" credit usually reserved for individuals brought onto a pilot written by someone else.

When Judge submitted the pilot script and drawings for King of the Hill to the network, network executives advised him that Hank Hill should be younger than 49 years old, as Judge had described the character. Judge received a phone message from a network executive who told him that Hank's age should be 32, the same age as the network's average viewer. Judge later said, "I got all angry, and then I was like, 'Well, wait. It's just a drawing.' So I just went back with the same drawing and said, 'Okay, he's 34.'" Daniel Stern was originally offered the role of Dale Gribble, but declined due to a salary dispute. Stephen Root also auditioned for the role, but later stated that "it didn't feel right"; Root ultimately was cast as Bill Dauterive. The role of Dale was eventually given to Johnny Hardwick. For the creation of Boomhauer, he was based on an angry caller leaving a voicemail on Beavis and Butt-Head creator Mike Judge and how he thought he was watching Looney Tunes. According to Judge, his angry, unintelligible mumbling mentioning "Porky's Butthole" became the creation of Boomhauer. Early promotional spots for the series featured clips of Boomhauer speaking, intercut with text that presented the term "Boombonics" in the style of a dictionary entry, as a reference to "Ebonics" (AAVE). The word was broken down into syllables, with proper pronunciation and the definition (see gibberish).

Work on the show's background music began in January 1997, the same month that it commenced airing. The show's production company, Judgmental Films, hired seven composers to write the music to the first 13 episodes. Among the seven composers were the band The Refreshments, who also composed the opening and closing themes that appear in every episode. The producers gave each composer one or two episodes to do whilst they were looking for the style that would best suit the program, eventually settling on John O'Connor and Roger Neill. Ron Wasserman, who composed the theme songs for Fox's Mighty Morphin Power Rangers and X-Men: The Animated Series, was interested in composing for the show and submitted acoustic guitar music during pre-production, although he would not end up being chosen as one of the initial seven composers on the first season. For the first season and beyond, the show's background music would typically be done three weeks before episodes went to air.

== Reception ==
The pilot episode of King of the Hill had received positive reviews from critics. Todd Camp of Fort Worth Star-Telegram praised it for being the show for being on "the trashy side." Jim Sullivan of The Boston Globe also praised the pilot episode and compared Hank Hill to Tom Anderson of Judge's previous show Beavis and Butt-Head.
