= No Shame Theatre =

University of Iowa theatre program

No Shame Theatre was founded by Todd Ristau and Stan Ruth at the University of Iowa in Iowa City, Iowa in 1986. It is a forum for stage performances of original works, often presented as a late-night talent show. Chapters were later started in New York, Los Angeles, Chicago, Charlottesville, and many college campuses. By 2012, 20 theatre troupes had been started across the United States.

== Notable alumni ==
- Toby Huss, performed at No Shame Theatre in Iowa City.
- John Leguizamo performed at No Shame Theatre in New York City
- Paul Rust performed at No Shame Theatre in Iowa City.
