= Lucky's Wedding Suit =

- King of the Hill episode
- Episode no.: Season 11; Episode 12
- Directed by: Mike Judge
- Written by: Jim Dauterive
- Production code: AABE05
- Original air date: May 20, 2007

Guest appearance
- Tom Petty as Lucky Kleinschmidt

Episode chronology
← Previous "Bill, Bulk and the Body Buddies"	Next → "Suite Smells of Excess"
- King of the Hill season 11

"Lucky's Wedding Suit" is the 12th episode and season finale of the eleventh season of the American animated television series King of the Hill, and the 213th episode overall. Written by Jim Dauterive, and directed by series creator Mike Judge, the episode originally aired on Fox on May 20, 2007, and it's a nominee for the Writers Guild of America Award in the animation category. The episode was originally scheduled to be the series finale before Fox decided to renew the series.

== Plot ==
With Lucky and Luanne engaged, the couple have begun planning their wedding. Luanne believes that Lucky's lawsuit winnings mean that they can have a lavish wedding, despite Lucky telling her that he doesn't have much of his settlement money left. Willing to do what it takes to make Luanne's wedding dreams come true, Lucky seeks advice from Hank. Hank, despite objecting to Luanne's extravagant desires, refers Lucky to Dale, who with a citywide bedbug epidemic on his hands has more pest control calls than he alone can handle. When Dale gives Lucky a gas mask and goggles for his new job, he says that the equipment makes him look like a bug, and the two have a mock-swordfight with spray wands. However, Lucky sustains a fall as they do so and suffers a back injury, regretfully deciding that he'll have to sue Dale's Dead-Bug in order to afford Luanne's dream wedding. After Lucky's tort lawyer Edward Johnson determines that there's no money to be made in suing Dale, he convinces Lucky to instead sue Strickland Propane after using convoluted jargon to pin blame on Hank, as a Strickland employee, for having referred Lucky to Dale in the first place.

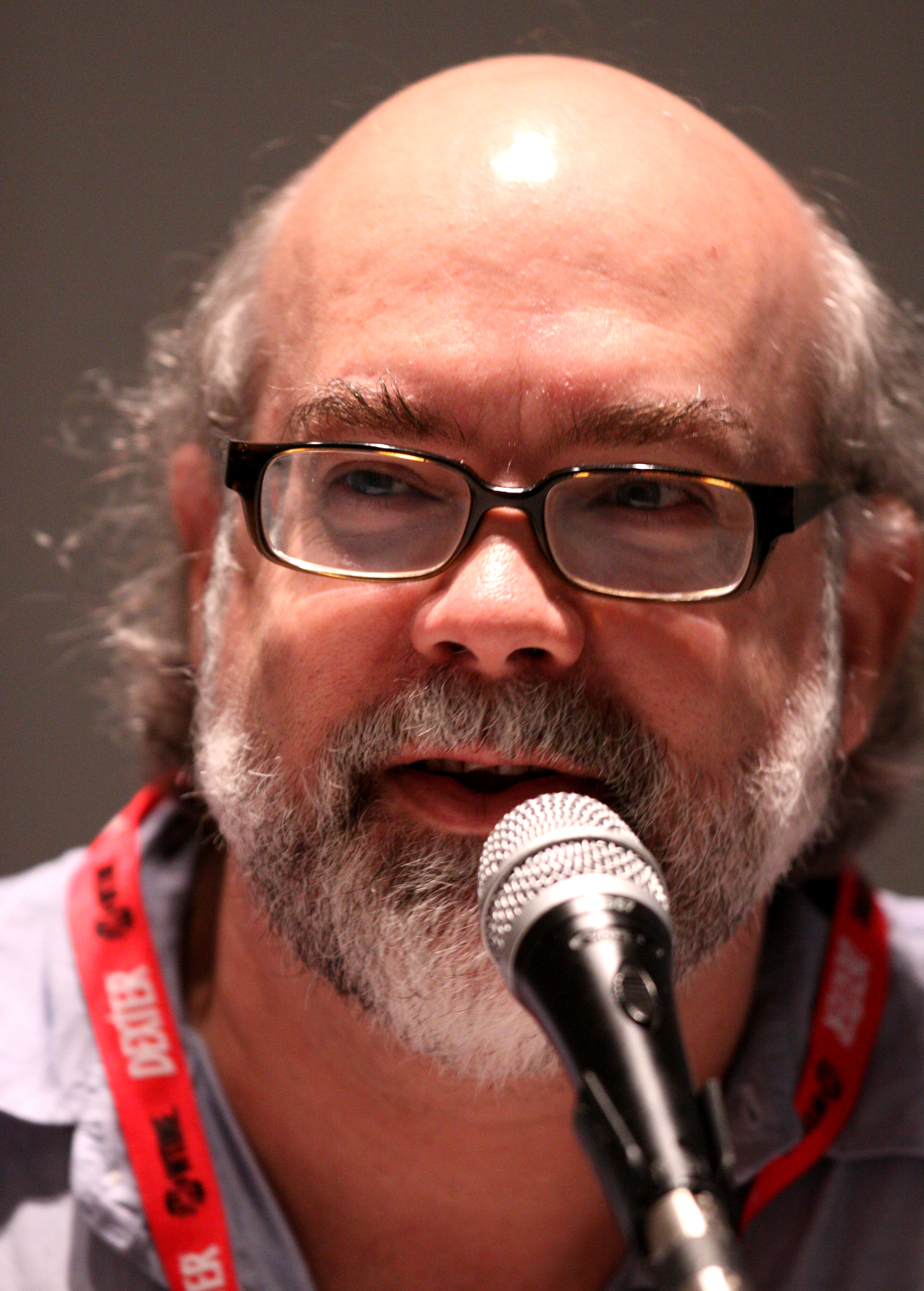
Jim Dauterive wrote the episode.

Luanne remains indifferent to Hank's disgust at the frivolous lawsuit; however, Lucky continues to regret the situation. After discussing things with Hank, Lucky goes back to Johnson and asks to drop the lawsuit, but Johnson guilts him out of dropping by saying that it would be malpractice to do so. Dismayed, Lucky relays Johnson's refusal to the guys, and Dale comes up with a plan: have Lucky fake not being injured so that there will appear to be no grounds to sue. Hank, Dale, and Lucky film a video of Lucky teeing off at the golf course (with Lucky barely suppressing his pain long enough to make it look convincing) and bring it to Johnson, who agrees that the footage is enough to destroy the case. However, Lucky drops a tire pressure gauge on the floor of the law office, and Johnson waits with a smirk for the 'man with the perfectly healthy back' to pick it up, watching as Lucky struggles to reach it. Thinking quickly, Lucky tells Dale that he looks like a bug, and Dale catches on, grabs a nearby umbrella, and knocks Lucky down. With Lucky in pain on the floor of the office, Hank tells Johnson that they could now sue him using the same jargon with which he had intended to sue Strickland Propane, since they have the video footage of Lucky appearing healthy prior to coming to his office. Furious, Johnson cuts Lucky a check for $53,000 on the spot.

Luanne's delight with the new settlement money quickly changes to indignance when Lucky proposes to instead use the money to buy a house and have a simpler, less expensive wedding. Her mind decidedly changes, however, when Lucky also shows her that they will have enough left over to buy baby clothes as well. On the day of the wedding, which is being held in the Hills' backyard, Hank goes to Luanne who seems a bit depressed over how basic the wedding is and apologizes for the simplicity of the ceremony, and she forgives him when he presents her with a wedding gift of two airline tickets and hotel fare to anywhere in the continental United States. Reverend Stroup arrives, and Luanne and Lucky are happily married before a large audience of friends and family. Afterward, as Lucky's truck pulls into the driveway of the newlyweds' new home across the street, Hank and his friends contentedly sip beer in the alley.

== Production notes ==
As the episode was originally intended as the series finale of King of the Hill, it includes references to earlier episodes. For example, in the ending wedding scene, a montage of many one-time and other minor characters from previous episodes at the wedding, including Anthony Page the social worker from the first episode and "Junkie Business", Monsignor Martinez, Luanne's beauty-school teacher Ms. Kremzer, Sharona Johnson, Hottyyz Owner Collete Davis, Arlen Bystander Columnist Bob Jenkins, Lucky's friends Elvin and Mud Dobber, Ted, Cindy, and Chane Wassanasong, Hank's half-brother Junichiro, Patch Boomhauer and his Grandmother, Tammy Duvall, Mack Walker, Hank's Mother Tillie and her husband Gary Kasner, Ms. Wakefield, Ernst, Peggy's mother ("A Rover Runs Through It" version) and Dale's father Bug Gribble are seen. Also, Cotton Hill tells Kahn that he'll have a mai tai at the wedding much like he did in his first appearance in the episode "Shins of the Father". Chuck Mangione appears at the end of the wedding scene. Once an often recurring character in early seasons, he has rarely appeared in more recent episodes. However, his running gag is maintained when the wedding song he plays for Luanne and Lucky turns, as does everything else he plays, into "Feels So Good". In the original ending scene, which was animated but cut from the episode, it would have been revealed the whole series took place over one year and that some of the more preposterous and surreal episodes were actually dreams.
