= Toby Huss =

American actor (born 1966)

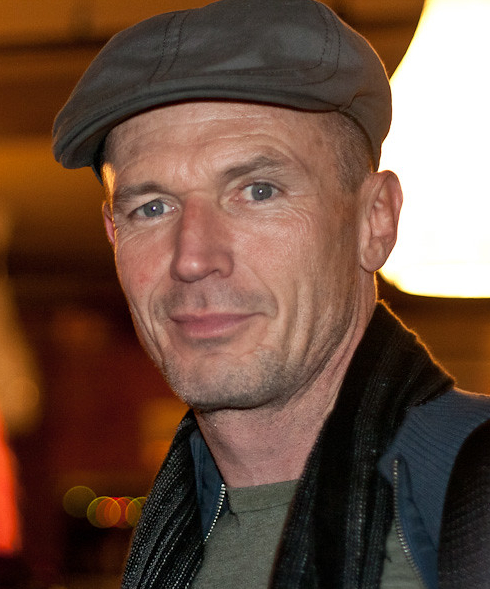
- Huss in 2012
- Born: Tobias Huss; December 9, 1966 (age 59); Marshalltown, Iowa, U.S.
- Other names: Rottilio Michieli, Rottilio Bettini
- Education: University of Iowa
- Occupation: Actor
- Years active: 1984–present
- Children: 1

Tobias Huss (born December 9, 1966) is an American actor. His first prominent role was portraying Artie, the superheroic friend of "Little" Pete Wrigley in the Nickelodeon series The Adventures of Pete & Pete (1993–1996). He went on to have starring roles in numerous television series, such as Felix "Stumpy" Dreifuss on HBO's Carnivàle (2003–2005), John Bosworth on the AMC original period drama Halt and Catch Fire (2014–2017) and Edward Dickinson on the Apple TV comedy-drama Dickinson (2019–2021). In film, he has appeared in Bedazzled (2000), 42 (2013), Enough Said (2013), Halloween (2018), Sword of Trust (2019), Copshop (2021), Weird: The Al Yankovic Story (2022), and Weapons (2025).

He has performed voice-over work on the animated series Beavis and Butt-Head (1994–1997, 2011, 2022–present), most notably as Todd Ianuzzi, and King of the Hill (1997–2010, 2025–present), voicing the characters Kahn Souphanousinphone and Cotton Hill in the initial run of the series, and later replacing Johnny Hardwick as the voice of Dale Gribble in the revival series.

== Early life ==
Huss was born on December 9, 1966, in Marshalltown, Iowa, to Gerald and Elma Huss. His father was a high school chemistry teacher, and his mother was a cosmetics sales representative. He attended the University of Iowa, where he participated in No Shame Theatre before moving to Los Angeles to pursue an acting career.

== Career ==
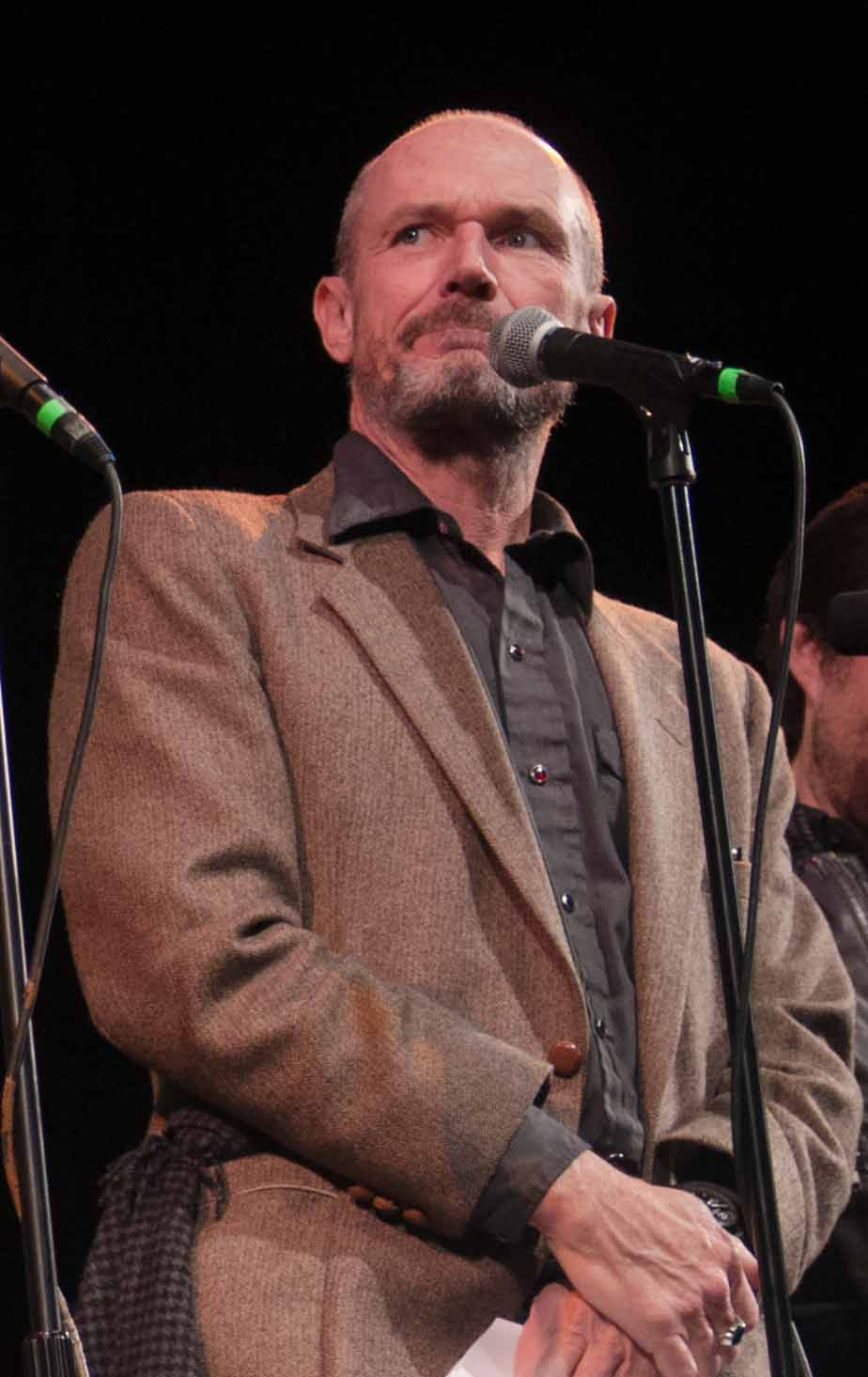
Huss at SF Sketchfest in 2016

In the early 1990s, Huss appeared in network promos for MTV, playing characters such as Ol' Two Eyes, who sang lounge-singer versions of Dr. Dre's "Dre Day", Cypress Hill's "Insane in the Brain", Pearl Jam's "Jeremy", and Onyx's "Slam"; a James Bond-like spy named Cobalt; a leather fetishist with an abnormal affection for goats; a "flannel-wearing doofus"; and an angry redneck named Reverend Tex Stoveheadbottom, who delivered fast-talking and descriptively detailed non sequitur tirades that usually included the phrase, "Go to Hell!". From 1993–1996, he played Artie, the Strongest Man in the World on Nickelodeon's The Adventures of Pete & Pete. Other notable roles include the voices of Cotton Hill and Kahn Souphanousinphone on King of the Hill and "the Wiz", a boyfriend of Elaine Benes, in the Seinfeld episode "The Junk Mail".

From his parodies of Frank Sinatra, which were featured in the films Vegas Vacation and Down Periscope, and the show Halt and Catch Fire, Huss has created a Sinatra-inspired character named Rudy Casoni. Huss released a 2003 album under Casoni's name called S'no Balls. As Huss put it in an interview with Paper, "You’d think he was a normal crooner, then he kind of gets dark."

In the 2025 revival of King of the Hill, Huss now also voices Dale Gribble, whose original voice actor Johnny Hardwick died in 2023.

In 2025, Huss would gain a more notable motion picture role as Captain Ed Locke in Weapons.

== Personal life ==
Huss is a single father and has one daughter. He is also a multidisciplinary artist, painter, and photographer.

== Filmography ==
Key
†	Denotes works that have not yet been released

=== Film ===
Year	Title	Role	Notes
1984	The Adventures of Roo	Pat Schliesman	Short film
1989	Zadar! Cow from Hell	Clerk	
1994	Hand Gun	Ted	
1995	The Basketball Diaries	Kenny	
1996	Dogs: The Rise and Fall of an All-Girl Bookie Joint	Sammy Cybernowski	
1996	Down Periscope	Nitro	
1996	Beavis and Butt-Head Do America	Concierge	Voice
1996	Dear God	Doubting Thomas Minister	
1996	Jerry Maguire	Steve Remo	
1997	Vegas Vacation	Fake I.D. Salesman	Uncredited
1998	Still Breathing	Cameron	
1998	Shock Television	Donut Shop Patron	
1999	The Wetonkawa Flash	Unknown	
1999	The Mod Squad	Red	
1999	Clubland	Rastus	
2000	Bedazzled	Jerry, Alejandro, Beach Jock, Sportscaster, Lance	
2000	A Good Baby	AmeriShine	Voice
2001	Human Nature	Puff's Father	
2001	Beyond the City Limits	Dykes	
2002	The Country Bears	Tennessee O'Neal	Voice
2006	Rescue Dawn	Spook	
2007	Reno 911!: Miami	Glen	
2007	Balls of Fury	Groundskeeper	
2007	Have Dreams, Will Travel	Deputy Raymond Ward	
2009	World's Greatest Dad	Bert Green	
2009	Cryptic	Lee	
2010	Furry Vengeance	Wilson	
2010	Alpha and Omega	Truck Stop Employee	Voice
2011	Cowboys & Aliens	Roy Murphy	
2011	God Bless America	Man With Cellphone	
2013	Bad Milo!	Dr. Yeager	
2013	42	Clyde Sukeforth	
2013	Hair Brained	Whittman Moderator	
2013	R.I.P.D.	Deado	Voice
2013	Enough Said	Peter	
2014	The Occupants	Father	
2015	The Invitation	Dr. Joseph	
2015	Little Boy	Colonel Bob	
2015	Equals	George	
2015	Martyrs	Fenton	
2016	In a Valley of Violence	Harris	
2016	Havenhurst	Wayne	
2016	Ghostbusters	Officer Stevenson	
2016	Heaven's Floor	Ed	
2016	Buster's Mal Heart	Deputy Winston	
2017	Girlfriend's Day	Betcher	
2017	Take Me	Officer Judkins	
2017	Big Bear	Cop	
2018	The Front Runner	Billy Broadhurst	
2018	Destroyer	Gil Lawson	
2018	Halloween	Ray Nelson	
2018	City of Lies	Detective Fred Miller	
2019	Sword of Trust	Hog Jaws	
2020	Horse Girl	Joe	
2020	The Rental	Taylor	
2021	Copshop	Anthony Lamb	
2021	Birds of Paradise	Scott Sanders	Voice
2022	Beavis and Butt-Head Do the Universe	Todd Ianuzzi	Voice
2022	Blonde	Whitey	
2022	Weird: The Al Yankovic Story	Nick Yankovic	
2023	Americana	Pendleton Duvall	
2023	Fast Charlie	Benny	
2024	MaXXXine	Coroner	
2024	Nutcrackers	Al Wilmington	
2025	Weapons	Captain Ed Locke	
2026	Gail Daughtry and the Celebrity Sex Pass	Scott	

=== Television ===
Year	Title	Role	Notes
1993–1996	The Adventures of Pete & Pete	Artie, the Strongest Man in the World, Mr. Tastee	11 episodes
1994–1997, 2011, 2022–present	Beavis and Butt-Head	Todd Ianuzzi, Henry, various	Voice, 26 episodes (under the name of Rottilio Michieli from 1994 to 1997)
1995–1999	NewsRadio	Jack Frost, Junior, Guard #2	3 episodes
1996	Roseanne	Eric	Episode: "Construction Junction"
1997	Seinfeld	Jack, The Wiz	Episode: "The Junk Mail"
1997–2010, 2025–present	King of the Hill	Kahn Souphanousinphone, Sr. (1997–2010), Ted Wassanasong (2000–2008), Cotton Hill, Joe Jack, Dale Gribble (2025–present), Additional voices	Voice, main role
1998	The Army Show	Cpl. Rusty Link	13 episodes
1999	Hercules	Additional voices	Episode: "Hercules and the Aetolian Amphora"
1999–2000	The Martin Short Show	Himself	Writer; 63 episodes
2000–2002	Nikki	Jupiter	Series regular; 41 episodes
2001	The Angry Beavers	Rikki / Pirate Rats	Voice, episode: "Beavemaster/Deck Poops"
2002	Home Movies	Coach / FPC Floating Head	Voice, episode: "Shore Leave"
2002–2003	One on One	Hank	5 episodes
2003	Windy City Heat	Ansel Adams	Television film
2003	The Making of King of the Hill	Himself	Television documentary
2003–2005	Carnivàle	Felix "Stumpy" Dreifuss	24 episodes
2003–2020	Reno 911!	Big Mike, General Lee	19 episodes
2004	Pilot Season	Stewart	Miniseries
2004–2006	Harvey Birdman, Attorney at Law	Ernie Devlin, Shado the Brain Thief	Voice, 4 episodes
2005	The Office	Todd Packer	Voice, episode: "Pilot"
2006	Help Me Help You	Lenny	2 episodes
2007	Curb Your Enthusiasm	Charlie	Episode: "The Freak Book"
2008	30 Rock	Deutsche Stimme	Voice, episode: "Episode 210"
2008	The Riches	P.I. Chet Landry	2 episodes
2008–2018	The Venture Bros.	Scaramantula, General Treister, Copy-Cat	Voice, 7 episodes
2009	In the Motherhood	Goose	Episode: "Bully"
2009	Bollywood Hero	Jeff Hacker	Episode #1.1
2009	The Goode Family	Clyde	2 episodes
2009	Hung	Cliff	Episode: "Thith Ith a Prothetic or You Cum Just Right"
2010	Criminal Minds	Frank Lynch	Episode: "Mosley Lane"
2010, 2016	Childrens Hospital	Old Timey Psychiatrist / Rex Hilliard	2 episodes
2011	Bob's Burgers	Robber	Voice, episode: "Hamburger Dinner Theater"
2011	The League	Flanagan the Drug Dealer	Episode: "The Out of Towner"
2011	Shameless	Steve's Boss	Episode: "Father Frank, Full of Grace"
2011	Mr. Sunshine	Travis	Episode: "Ben and Vivian"
2011	Adventure Time	Booboo, Commander in Movie	Voice, episode: "Heat Signature"
2011	Rip City	Ronnie	Television film
2011–2013	The Cleveland Show	Tutor, Dodgers Coach	Voice, 2 episodes
2011–2012	Kung Fu Panda: Legends of Awesomeness	Mr. Yeung, Snow Leopard	Voice, 2 episodes
2012	CSI: Crime Scene Investigation	Jeff Levitt, Frank Sinatra	Episode: "It Was a Very Good Year"
2012	The New Normal	Farmer Mark	Episode: "Pardon Me"
2013	Anger Management	Tom	Episode: "Charlie and the Ex-Patient"
2013	Newsreaders	Peter Ruby	Episode: "Fit Town, Fat Town"
2013	NTSF:SD:SUV	E-Cigarette Smoking Man	Episode: "Extra Terrorist-rial"
2013	Brickleberry	Aubrey	Voice, episode: "Tailer Park"
2013	Key & Peele	Shoeshine Customer	Episode #3.13
2013	The Arrangement	Dizzy Pagliouci	Television film
2013–2015	Sanjay and Craig	Farmer Larry, Announcer, Steve the Pizza Mascot, Cop, Shopper, Additional voices	7 episodes
2014	The Spoils of Babylon	Seymore Lunts	2 episodes
2014	Garfunkel & Oates	Tom	Episode: "Road Warriors"
2014	A to Z	Uncle Dave	Episode: "D Is for Debbie"
2014–2017	Halt and Catch Fire	John Bosworth	38 episodes
2015	Mom	Bill	Episode: "Cheeseburger Salad and Jazz"
2015	Sin City Saints	Coach Doug	8 episodes
2015	Dr. Ken	Captain Spooky	Episode: "Halloween-Aversary"
2016	Black-ish	Nelson	Episode: "Sink or Swim"
2016	All the Way	Governor Paul B. Johnson Jr.	Television film
2016–2017	Outcast	Mayor	7 episodes
2017	Colony	Bob Burke	7 episodes
2017	Feud: Bette and Joan	Frank Sinatra	2 episodes
2017	Brockmire	Johnny the Hat	5 episodes
2017	Veep	Quartie Sturges	2 episodes
2017	Brooklyn Nine-Nine	Warden Granville	2 episodes
2017	Tarantula		Voice, 4 episodes
2018	Bobcat Goldthwait's Misfits & Monsters	Sgt. McCreedy	Episode: "Sgt. McCreedy"
2018	Sacred Lies	Kevin Groth (aka "The Prophet")	Series regular
2018	Harvey Birdman: Attorney General	Ernie Devlin	Voice, television film
2019	The Epic Tales of Captain Underpants	Caesar, Cruelius Sneezer	Voice, episode: "Captain Underpants and the Crazy Caustic Spray of the Contagious Cruelius Sneezer"
2019	GLOW	J. J. "Tex" McCready	4 episodes
2019	The Righteous Gemstones	Dale Nancy	3 episodes
2019–2021	Dickinson	Edward Dickinson	Main role
2020	Brews Brothers	Homeless Man	3 episodes
2022	Angelyne	Hugh Hefner	Episode: "Glow in the Dark Queen of the Universe"
2023	White House Plumbers	James W. McCord Jr.	5 episodes
2023	Fatal Attraction	Mike Gerard	8 episodes
2023–2025	Bookie	Carl Lurtsema	7 episodes
2024	Star Trek: Lower Decks	Admiral Milius	Voice, episode: "The Best Exotic Nanite Hotel"
2025	Chad Powers	Mike Holliday	3 episodes
2025–2026	NCIS: Origins	Regional Director Ronald Barrett	4 episodes
2025–2026	The Four Seasons	Terry	2 episodes
2025–2026	Law & Order: Special Victims Unit	Detective John Whalen	2 episodes
2026	Widow's Bay	Reverend Bryce	3 episodes
2026	Life, Larry and the Pursuit of Unhappiness	Herbert	Episode 6 ("Buzz")
TBA	Kennedy	Franklin D. Roosevelt	

=== Video games ===
Year	Title	Role	Notes
1995	Beavis and Butt-Head in Virtual Stupidity	Additional voices	
2000	Black King of the Hill	L’Darius Hill, Kahn Souphanousinphone, Cotton Hill	

=== Web ===
Year	Title	Role	Notes
2014	Kevin Pollak's Chat Show	Himself/Guest	Episode: "277"

=== Audio ===
Year	Title	Role	Notes	Ref(s)
2023	White House Plumbers Podcast	Himself	Episode 3	

== Discography ==
- S'no Balls (2004)
