= King of the Hill season 13 =

Season of television series

King of the Hill
- Season 13
- DVD cover
- Showrunners: John Altschuler; Dave Krinsky
- Starring: Mike Judge; Kathy Najimy; Pamela Adlon; Brittany Murphy; Johnny Hardwick; Stephen Root; Toby Huss
- No. of episodes: 24

Release
- Original network: Fox; Syndication (episodes 20–23)
- Original release: September 28, 2008 – September 13, 2009; Episodes 20–23 burning off May 3–6, 2010

Season chronology
- ← Previous; Season 12 Next → Season 14

The thirteenth season of King of the Hill originally aired at the 8:30–9:00 p.m. (EST) on Sunday nights on the Fox Broadcasting Company from September 28, 2008, to September 13, 2009. Four episodes from this final season originally premiered in syndication during the first week of May 2010. Actress Brittany Murphy, who voiced Luanne Platter, died on December 20, 2009, five months before the final four episodes aired. It is the final season of the show's initial run and the last to air on Fox.

== Production ==
The showrunners for the season were John Altschuler and Dave Krinsky. Beginning with the episode "Lucky See, Monkey Do" (and in preparation for the DTV transition scheduled for during the season), King of the Hill started being produced in 720p 16:9 high-definition. 20th Century Fox Television initially ordered thirteen production episodes, but decided to keep the show in production for four additional episodes.

Like the previous season, because Fox wanted to make room for new shows on their "Animation Domination" line-up, two of the final six episodes that aired were "The Boy Can't Help It" and "To Sirloin with Love". Both episodes aired as a special one-hour final on September 13, 2009. The other four episodes "The Honeymooners," "Bill Gathers Moss," "When Joseph Met Lori, and Made Out with Her in the Janitor's Closet," and "Just Another Manic Kahn-Day" premiered first on local syndication in May 2010, and later appeared on Adult Swim as well as TV channels Comedy Central and FXX and various streaming platforms. Despite this, "To Sirloin with Love" is usually considered by fans as the last episode of the series, since it was written as such. On Olive Films' DVD and Blu-Ray release of this season, "To Sirloin with Love" is ordered as the last episode, with the four episodes that aired in syndication during the first week of May 2010 being presented in their production order, rather than in their airdate order. On streaming platform Hulu, these four episodes are presented in their airdate order, with "Just Another Manic Kahn-Day" appearing as the final episode of the series. Film and television databases such as IMDb also typically ordered them as the final episodes, due to their airdates.

== Episodes ==
No. overall	No. in season	Title	Directed by	Written by	Original release date	Prod. code	U.S. viewers (millions)
236	1	"Dia-BILL-ic Shock"	Ronald Rubio	Sanjay Shah	September 28, 2008	CABE16	7.10
Bill, unwilling to change his sugary eating habits after collapsing from a blood sugar spike, is diagnosed with diabetes. When his first attempt to put it under control fails, a mean-spirited doctor tells him that he is going to lose his legs. After deciding to use a wheelchair (which he really does not need), he is befriended by a rugby player named Thunder, who teaches him how to be independent, but their friendship is strained when Thunder realizes Bill is not really disabled. And that holds true for all Bill's relationships. Guest Star: Jake Steinfeld as Thunder
237	2	"Earthy Girls Are Easy"	Matt Engstrom	Paul Corrigan & Brad Walsh	October 5, 2008	CABE17	6.59
A local paper plans to run a story about Strickland Propane illegally dumping old propane tanks into the river. Hank suggests the company go green, and when the ladies of Arlen hear of the eco-efforts made by the company, Dale decides to help out Strickland with their carbon off-sets to garner the attention of the girls. To impress the ladies, Mr. Strickland organizes an Earth benefit concert.
238	3	"Square-Footed Monster"	Kyounghee Lim	Jerry Collins	October 19, 2008	CABE18	7.41
After Hank and the guys fix up the recently deceased Dotty Dwyer's house, Dotty's nephew sells the house to Ted Wassanasong. But when Ted has construction workers tear down the home to make way for a McMansion (and Kahn discovers that Ted didn't build the house to move into it), the Hill family and the rest of the neighborhood visit the City Council to protest the construction and must team up to tear it down when it falls apart during a thunderstorm. Guest Stars: Bob Elliott as Edgar Hornsby, Chris Elliott as Ed Burnett, Abby Elliott as Clerk #1
239	4	"Lost in MySpace"	Tony Kluck	Judah Miller & Murray Miller	November 2, 2008	CABE14	8.50
To boost business, Strickland Propane takes to advertising on the social media site MySpace, but when Donna is put in charge of creating the MySpace page, she uses the opportunity to make Strickland Propane look foolish and unprofessional. This eventually leads to Hank confronting Donna and she agrees to take down the negative content in exchange for him going easy on her. Meanwhile, Dale rents a pig to hunt truffles, loses it, and has to borrow Ladybird in order to track it down.
240	5	"No Bobby Left Behind"	Tricia Garcia	Tim Croston & Chip Hall	November 9, 2008	CABE15	6.79
To raise the school's grade point average as part of the No Child Left Behind program, Bobby and Joseph are put into a "special needs" class, which irks Hank, who believes his son's mediocre grades are from lack of trying. And things get worse when Principal Moss lets the "special needs" kids go on a trip to Alamo Land on the same day as the honors students.
241	6	"A Bill Full of Dollars"	Steve Robertson	Dan McGrath	November 16, 2008	CABE19	7.08
After losing money in the stock market, Peggy, Minh, and Dale decide to study an average man (Bill) in order to find out what sells among people like him.
242	7	"Straight as an Arrow"	Robin Brigstocke	Tony Gama-Lobo & Rebecca May	November 30, 2008	CABE20	6.33
When Bobby decides to become a member of the Order of the Straight Arrow (even though it was established that Bobby is already a member according to the season one episode "Order of the Straight Arrow"), Hank decides to get involved as well, but when he bumps heads with the Arrowmaster, who happens to be a new resident of Arlen, Hank finds his teaching methods to be too childish and overprotective, rather than being risky. Meanwhile, Lucky and Luanne shake their neighbors down for gifts after realizing no one gave them anything on their wedding day or their baby shower. Guest Stars: Andy Richter as Wesley Cherish
243	8	"Lucky See, Monkey Do"	Kyounghee Lim	Paul Corrigan & Brad Walsh	February 8, 2009	DABE01	4.75
When Peggy plans a baby shower for Luanne, Lucky invites his sister Myrna and her children to the party. Myrna has conflicting parenting information to give Luanne, and is described by Peggy as a "modern mother". Meanwhile, Bill falls for a fast-food hotline operator's voice and travels to Arizona to find the woman behind the voice. Guest Stars: Paget Brewster as Myrna Kleinschmidt
244	9	"What Happens at the National Propane Gas Convention in Memphis Stays at the National Propane Gas Convention in Memphis"	Ronald Rubio	Jim Dauterive	February 15, 2009	DABE02	5.41
When Buck Strickland is invited to the National Propane Gas Convention as the newest inductee into the Propane Hall of Flame, he asks Hank to accompany him. Although Hank is honored, he quickly realizes his primary responsibility will be babysitting Buck and preventing him from getting into trouble. Hank's job is made that much more difficult when Buck meets his illegitimate son Jody (guest voice Diedrich Bader) at the convention and stays out late carousing with him. Guest Stars: Diedrich Bader as Jody "Ray Roy" Strickland, Beth Grant, and Mary Kay Place
245	10	"Master of Puppets"	Tony Kluck	Blake McCormick	March 1, 2009	DABE03	5.74
When Hank and Peggy forget to pick up Bobby at the mall, he begins using emotional blackmail to get them to do whatever he wants as revenge. Meanwhile, Dale camps out in the backyard after seeing a "survive in the wild" reality show.
246	11	"Bwah My Nose"	Jeff Myers	Judah Miller & Murray Miller	March 8, 2009	DABE04	4.95
During a football game practice for an upcoming rematch, Bill breaks Hank's nose. After trying to live with the injury, Hank reluctantly gets plastic surgery...and becomes hung up on his looks.
247	12	"Uncool Customer"	Tricia Garcia	Christy Stratton	March 15, 2009	DABE05	5.48
After Peggy finds out that she is not cool, she befriends one of Arlen's most glamorous and coolest moms in an effort to learn how to be cool. Meanwhile, Bobby joins a Cotillion class so he can be a proper gentleman and Hank finds a restaurant that sells delicious meatloaf sandwiches, but has a bizarre seating arrangement. Guest Stars: Kate Walsh as Katt Savage
248	13	"Nancy Does Dallas"	Michael Loya	Tony Gama-Lobo & Rebecca May	March 22, 2009	DABE06	5.51
Nancy cheats and back-stabs her way to being top news anchor after being promoted to a Dallas station, and soon finds the ride downhill to be a bumpy one — especially when she appears at the Thanksgiving Day parade drunk. Meanwhile, Dale conducts a hare-brained experiment by turning the house into an igloo. Guest Stars: Peri Gilpin as Gwen St. James
249	14	"Born Again on the Fourth of July"	Ken Wong	Erin Ehrlich	April 19, 2009	DABE07	3.39
Hank gets involved in a neighborhood war over Independence Day decorations, while a misbehaving Bobby is scared into righteousness by a fire-and-brimstone preacher.
250	15	"Serves Me Right for Giving General George S. Patton the Bathroom Key"	Steve Robertson	Tim Croston & Chip Hall	April 26, 2009	DABE08	2.89
Hank receives a special delivery of his recently deceased father's personal belongings, including a list of bizarre final requests – one of which calls for Hank to flush Cotton's ashes (even though it was established that Cotton received a burial plot at the Texas State Cemetery according to the season four episode "Cotton's Plot") in the toilet of a bar once used by General George S. Patton. Meanwhile, Dale and Bill bicker over an empty beer can Dale discarded in Bill's yard and will not pick up.
251	16	"Bad News Bill"	Ronald Rubio	Dave Schiff	May 3, 2009	DABE10	5.14
When Hank tries to be realistic about Bobby's below-average baseball abilities, he is vilified by Bobby's over-enthusiastic Little League coach, who only wants to set Bobby up for disappointment. Meanwhile, Bill is hired as the head of the baseball field's snack counter.
252	17	"Manger Baby Einstein"	Kyounghee Lim	Sanjay Shah	May 10, 2009	DABE09	4.17
While adjusting to her new career and life as a mom, Luanne resurrects her Manger Baby puppets and, with help from John Redcorn, starts a series of direct-to-DVD educational shows, but risks selling out when the franchise grows stale and other entertainers line up to take her place. Meanwhile, Dale writes a children's book about a lost bullet wanting to get home to find its gun.
253	18	"Uh-oh, Canada"	Tony Kluck	Jerry Collins	May 17, 2009	DABE11	5.22
Boomhauer vacations in Guelph, Ontario, and meets a beautiful French-Canadian woman. Meanwhile, a Canadian family living in Boomhauer's house for the summer irks Hank.
254	19	"The Boy Can't Help It"	Jeff Myers	Dan McGrath	September 13, 2009	DABE12	6.26
Bobby becomes quite the ladies' man when several girls in his class consider him a potential date for the Homecoming dance, but Hank is worried that Bobby is being used. Meanwhile, Hank and the guys try to put together the ultimate shopping cart for a local homeless man.
255	20	"The Honeymooners"	Tricia Garcia	Paul Corrigan & Brad Walsh	May 3, 2010	DABE13	N/A
Hank's mother announces she is marrying her new boyfriend, Chuck Garrison. Soon after, the newlyweds celebrate by purchasing an RV and Hank is left to rescue his mother once again. Guest Stars: William Devane as Chuck Garrison and Beth Grant as Tilly Hill. Note: This episode was dedicated to Brittany Murphy.
256	21	"Bill Gathers Moss"	Michael Loya	Aron Abrams & Gregory Thompson	May 4, 2010	DABE14	N/A
Feeling lonely (and inspired by a cheesy sitcom about the wacky adventures of two roommates), Bill decides to take in roommates, but things take a turn for the worse when Bill is forced to take in a homeless Principal Moss (who recently lost his house and his car in a divorce and has been reduced to living in the school after hours, which Bobby and Joseph mistake for the paranormal activity of a dead homecoming queen), a former Playboy Bunny, and a Russian counterfeiter, who uses Moss to sell his bootlegged wares at Tom Landry Middle School. Guest Stars: Mimi Rogers as Katie
257	22	"When Joseph Met Lori, and Made Out with Her in the Janitor's Closet"	Ken Wong	Sanjay Shah	May 5, 2010	DABE15	N/A
Joseph goes out with a girl who wants their relationship to become physical and goes to Dale for advice, but Dale checks himself into a mental hospital to avoid giving his son the sex talk. Meanwhile, Nancy competes with her coworkers to find the most compelling human-interest story to broadcast on the air. Guest Stars: Aasif Mandvi as Mike Patel
258	23	"Just Another Manic Kahn-Day"	Jack Perkins & Steve Robertson	Jennifer Barrow	May 6, 2010	DABE16	N/A
Hank advises Kahn not to pick up his medication at the pharmacy, until he realizes that Kahn needs his medication to curb his manic depressive mood swings, though Hank must choose between giving Kahn his medicine or exploiting his neighbor's mania (which makes Kahn friendlier and incredibly skilled at robotics) in order to create a top-of-the-line grill. Meanwhile, Bobby tries to find the humor in a "Raymond J. Johnson Jr." comedy record after his parents and other adults claim it is funny. Guest Star: Bill Saluga as Raymond J. Johnson Jr.
259	24	"To Sirloin with Love"	Kyounghee Lim	Jim Dauterive; Tony Gama-Lobo & Rebecca May; Christy Stratton	September 13, 2009	DABE17	6.04
Hank discovers that Bobby has a talent for inspecting and distinguishing cuts of beef (a skill Hank taught Bobby ever since he was a baby, but wasn't made apparent until now), and puts Bobby on a meat-inspecting team run by Heimlich County's community college, but a slip-up during regionals has Bobby worried that he may disappoint his father again. Guest Stars: Duff Goldman as himself and Geof Manthorne (credited as "Geoffry Manthorne") as himself
