= King of the Hill season 12 =

King of the Hill
- Season 12
- DVD cover
- Showrunners: John Altschuler; Dave Krinsky
- Starring: Mike Judge; Kathy Najimy; Pamela Adlon; Brittany Murphy; Johnny Hardwick; Stephen Root; Toby Huss
- No. of episodes: 22

Release
- Original network: Fox
- Original release: September 23, 2007 – May 18, 2008

Season chronology
- ← Previous; Season 11 Next → Season 13

The twelfth season of King of the Hill originally aired Sundays at 8:30–9:00 p.m. (EST) on the Fox Broadcasting Company from September 23, 2007, to May 18, 2008.

== Production ==
The showrunners for the season were John Altschuler and Dave Krinsky.

== Episodes ==
No. overall	No. in season	Title	Directed by	Written by	Original release date	Prod. code	U.S. viewers (millions)
214	1	"Suite Smells of Excess"	Michael Loya	Dave Schiff	September 23, 2007	BABE13	7.82
When the guys take Bobby to a University of Texas football game, their hijinks land them in a VIP box suite, where Hank is mistaken for a former player of the opposing Nebraska Cornhuskers, and is asked to call a crucial play for the team. Meanwhile, Peggy shops for a new TV after breaking the old one in a fit of rage.
215	2	"Bobby Rae"	Ken Wong	Tim Croston & Chip Hall	September 30, 2007	BABE12	7.27
Bobby feigns interest in activism when he goes after the heart of a real student activist, who protests the installation of soda machines in the school (and the funds from said soda machines being used to pay for the teachers' vacation).
216	3	"The Powder Puff Boys"	Ronald Rubio	Christy Stratton	October 7, 2007	BABE16	6.22
Hank encourages Bobby to be a part of the school's Powder Puff team (a team where boys dress in drag and impersonate female cheerleaders). However, the boys learn that Peggy and the PTA are trying to put a stop to the tradition, as they feel it's demeaning to women. Guest Stars: Lisa Edelstein as Alexis and Mitchel Musso as Curtis
217	4	"Four Wave Intersection"	Anthony Chun	Judah Miller & Murray Miller	October 14, 2007	BABE15	7.53
Arlen is hit by a heat wave, and Hank takes the kids to the water park. Unfortunately, they have to tangle with a group of surfer bullies to enjoy the "Endless Wave". Meanwhile, Boomhauer tries to regain his coolness after two sexy ladies laugh at him for wearing cutoff jeans, and Bill becomes a local celebrity known as the "Heat Waver" after his car breaks down and he begins waving at passing motorists.
218	5	"Death Picks Cotton"	Tony Kluck	Judah Miller & Murray Miller	November 11, 2007	BABE14	7.60
While at a Japanese restaurant, Cotton suffers a war flashback and ends up getting hospitalized after falling on the grill and suffering from a shrimp allergy, where Peggy learns that Cotton may not have long to live.
219	6	"Raise the Steaks"	Robin Brigstocke	Paul Corrigan & Brad Walsh	November 18, 2007	BABE17	9.23
After buying tough, unsavory steaks at the Mega-Lo-Mart, Hank, at Appleseed's suggestion, visits the town co-op in search of better meat. After falling in love with the delicious organic food, Hank becomes a co-op volunteer and co-owner, but his business skills cause the co-op to sell out to Mega Lo-Mart.
220	7	"Tears of an Inflatable Clown"	Tricia Garcia	Erin Ehrlich	November 25, 2007	BABE19	3.99
Bobby's plans for a school carnival are ruined by a diversity expert, who tricks the carnival committee into planning an assembly about racial and ethnic guilt. Meanwhile, Dale, Bill and Boomhauer try to get a reluctant Lucky to the hospital when he injures himself.
221	8	"The Minh Who Knew Too Much"	Kyounghee Lim	Dan McGrath	December 9, 2007	BABE18	6.58
Minh joins the Arlen Gun Club to learn skeet shooting, a skill she hopes that will make an exclusive country club want her and Kahn as members. Meanwhile, Hank tries to solve the mystery of who's been discarding trash in his trash cans.
222	9	"Dream Weaver"	Ken Wong	Jennifer Barrow	December 16, 2007	BABE20	7.76
Nancy wants Dale to get a new job since he is not making any money, so he and Hank go on a "vocation vacation" to learn basket weaving. Meanwhile, Peggy, Kahn and Bill try to achieve Internet stardom by creating a wacky viral video.
223	10	"Doggone Crazy"	Michael Loya	Dave Schiff	January 6, 2008	CABE01	6.94
The Hills' dog, Ladybird, suddenly begins acting erratically and is put on a list of vicious dogs, and if Hank doesn't hire a spiritualist to cure her, Ladybird will be euthanized.
224	11	"Trans-Fascism"	Kyounghee Lim	Paul Corrigan & Brad Walsh	February 10, 2008	CABE02	6.06
When the Arlen City Council bans the sale of foods containing trans fats (along with rare burgers and raw oysters), Sugarfoot's Restaurant goes out of business. Strickland's solution to the problem is to sell his delicious, trans-fatty foods on a lunch truck so he can evade the law. Soon enough, other competitors come along, and with help from Nancy, Hank blackmails the town into repealing the food ban. Guest Stars: Fred Willard as Officer Brown
225	12	"Untitled Blake McCormick Project"	Ken Wong	Blake McCormick	February 17, 2008	CABE03	6.45
Bill becomes involved with a single mother, Charlene, who once had an affair with John Redcorn, and, like Nancy Gribble, has a half-Native American child who, like Joseph Gribble, is ignorant of her biological father's identity. Meanwhile, Joseph falls for Charlene's daughter, but everyone tries to keep him away from her as the two are half-siblings. Guest Star: Melinda Clarke as Charlene This episode was originally titled "Three Men and a Bastard."
226	13	"The Accidental Terrorist"	Robin Brigstocke	Tim Croston & Chip Hall	March 2, 2008	CABE04	7.75
Hank finds out his car salesman has been tricking him into overpaying for vehicle purchases, and in pursuit of recourse, gets tangled (and nearly prosecuted) in a botched plan cooked up by two college-aged activists. Guest Star: Ted Danson as Tom Hammond
227	14	"Lady and Gentrification"	Anthony Chun	Judah Miller & Murray Miller	March 9, 2008	CABE05	6.25
Peggy inadvertently ruins Enrique's life when she sells a house in Enrique's neighborhood to a young hipster (voiced by Dax Shepard), who invites his hipster friends over to live in the same neighborhood. Meanwhile, Hank is asked to speak at Enrique's daughter Inez's quinceañera. Guest Stars: Alicia Sixtos as Inez, Dax Shepard as Asa, and Abby Elliott as Hipster Girl
228	15	"Behind Closed Doors"	Tony Kluck	Christy Stratton	March 16, 2008	CABE06	6.03
Tom Landry Middle School holds an emergency community meeting when Dooley goes missing in Arlen, run by relationship expert Stephens Davies, who calls Peggy out on not keeping her family tight-knit. Meanwhile, Dale buys a keyboard so he can accentuate conversation with musical flourishes. Guest Stars: Ed Begley Jr. as Stephen Davies
229	16	"Pour Some Sugar on Kahn"	Tricia Garcia	Sanjay Shah	March 30, 2008	CABE07	6.07
Kahn becomes a karaoke bar star to show up his father-in-law, General Gum...until Gum steals the karaoke song that made Kahn a hit.
230	17	"Six Characters in Search of a House"	Ron Rubio	Erin Ehrlich	April 6, 2008	CABE08	5.28
Peggy brings in a family of struggling actors to sell a house currently occupied by the strangest family in Arlen, but inadvertently ends up selling the Hills' house because it looks so good by comparison. Guest Stars: Abby Elliott as Melrose, David Koechner as Frank, and Glenn Morshower as Bud Ferguson
231	18	"The Courtship of Joseph's Father"	Michael Loya	Tony Gama-Lobo & Rebecca May	April 13, 2008	CABE09	6.07
Joseph becomes the star quarterback at Tom Landry Middle School, and gives the school hope that they'll actually win this year -- until a wealthy prep school offers Joseph a chance to play for their school.
232	19	"Strangeness on a Train"	Kyounghee Lim	Jim Dauterive	April 27, 2008	CABE10	6.53
Depressed over her past botched birthday parties, Peggy schedules a 1970s-style murder mystery party on a train, but when Luanne ruins the ending, a new mystery crops up — after Hank and Peggy have sex in the train bathroom.
233	20	"Cops and Robert"	Ken Wong	Dave Schiff	May 4, 2008	CABE11	5.71
When Hank accidentally steals another man's wallet (thinking that the man pickpocketed him), the man begins exacting his revenge on Hank. Meanwhile, Bobby gets sentenced to spend the day with the school security guard after being framed for throwing a soda can at him, and Dale attempts to get a job at a Hooters-esque restaurant called "Bazooms" by citing sexual discrimination if he is not hired. Guest Stars: Fred Willard as Officer Brown
234	21	"It Came from the Garage"	Robin Brigstocke	Blake McCormick	May 11, 2008	CABE12	5.04
Hank and Bobby get in some father/son bonding time when Hank dumps the old team of Dale, Bill and Boomhauer to help Bobby in a boat-building competition. During the building process, Hank gets spooked by a bat invading the construction garage, forcing Bobby to do the building all alone.
235	22	"Life: A Loser's Manual"	Anthony Chun	Dan McGrath	May 18, 2008	CABE13	5.40
Luanne's father/Peggy's brother, Hoyt (voiced by Johnny Knoxville), comes to Arlen to stay with the family, and Hank discovers that Hoyt is a convict who's one strike away from being put in prison for life and that the story of how he went to work on an oil rig to escape his abusive wife, Leanne, was a lie made up to make Luanne feel better about Hoyt's absence. Guest Stars: Johnny Knoxville as Hoyt Platter
