= To Sirloin with Love =

- King of the Hill episode
- Episode no.: Season 13; Episode 20
- Directed by: Kyounghee Lim
- Written by: Jim Dauterive; Tony Gama-Lobo; Rebecca May; Christy Stratton
- Production code: DABE17
- Original air date: September 13, 2009

Guest appearances
- Duff Goldman as himself; Geoffry Manthorne as himself

Episode chronology
← Previous "The Boy Can't Help It"	Next → "The Honeymooners"
- King of the Hill season 13

"To Sirloin with Love" is the 20th episode and the finale of the 13th season of the American animated television series King of the Hill. It is the 259th episode of the series overall and the series finale of the show's original run. It originally aired on Fox on September 13, 2009. Although it was supposed to be the final airing episode, the order of release was changed and 4 previously unaired episodes aired between May 3, 2010 and May 6, 2010.

The episode was directed by Kyounghee Lim and written by Jim Dauterive, Tony Gama-Lobo, Rebecca May, and Christy Stratton. It received a 9/10 rating among adults 18-49 and positive reviews from critics and fans of the show alike. The title of this episode is a reference to To Sir, with Love, a British drama film.

== Plot ==
Hank finds himself left alone with Bobby when Peggy decides to spend an evening with the other women of the neighborhood. The two have an uneasy dinner at a steakhouse, during which Bobby surprises Hank by accurately pointing out the inferior quality of their steaks. This draws the attention of the coach of the Heimlich County Junior College meat examination team, and Hank enthusiastically supports Bobby's decision to join them. Driven by his talents - which were brought on by Hank teaching Bobby about cows and cuts of meat ever since he was a baby - the team performs well until the final event of the regional competition. Bobby represents HCJC, confident that he can deliver a victory, but makes a crucial mistake that results in a fourth-place finish. Even though the team has qualified at the statewide level, Bobby's teammates lose all their confidence in him.

At dinner the night before State, Bobby discovers that the rest of the team does not share his passion for meat and will do anything to win, even assaulting rival squads if necessary. He decides to quit, but Hank insists on riding to State with the team as well. Suddenly, the bus is hijacked by supporters of Texas A&F, HCJC's nemesis, who strand it in a creek and force everyone to surrender their cell phones. At home, Peggy, Enrique, and Joe Jack bring out a small propane grill meant as a surprise present for Bobby after the state finals, so that he and Hank can grill together. Seeing the grill inspires Bobby to rejoin the team, but when Peggy drives him there, they learn of the others' absence and Bobby has to represent HCJC by himself.

Dale, Bill, and Boomhauer find the stranded bus, having followed it from Arlen, and give Hank and the team a ride to State. On the way, Hank realizes that Bobby was right about the others and berates them sharply for giving up on him so easily. Peggy calls Boomhauer to find out what is going on, having first tried to call Hank, whose cell phone was taken during the hijacking; by the time the team arrives, Bobby has reached the final event and is about to face off against Texas A&F. His teammates push him to the sidelines, but a pep talk from Hank gives him the confidence to stand up to them. Despite his teammates' verbal lack of faith in him, Bobby correctly identifies a minuscule flaw in a side of beef that all the others had missed, winning the championship for HCJC.

Afterward, Hank and Bobby fire up their grills, having finally found a common interest, and attract a yard full of happy, hungry neighbors ready for a cookout. Kahn tells Connie to take the night off from studying; Dale has figured out how to relieve Nancy's headaches on his own, Lucky and Luanne scoop up Gracie and head for the Hills'; and Boomhauer hurries over, leaving his wallet behind - which flips open to reveal a Texas Ranger badge, the only definitive indication of his career in the entire series. As Bobby puts the last steak on the grill, Hank reassures him that he can grill for his entire life. The final shot of the episode mirrors the beginning of the series pilot, with the camera panning over Arlen accompanied by a "yep" from Bobby.

== Production ==
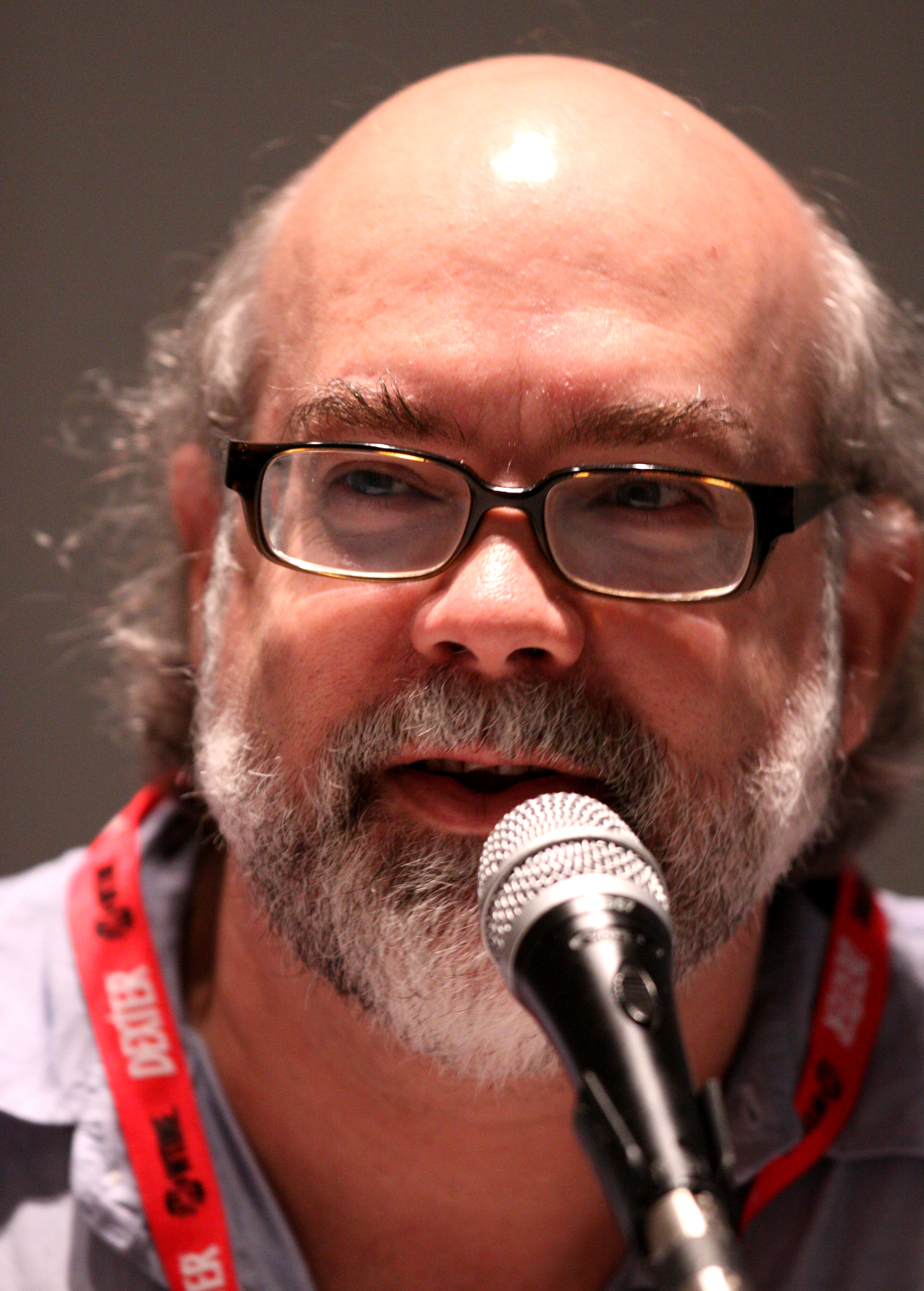
Jim Dauterive co-wrote the episode.

The episode was written by Jim Dauterive, Tony Gama-Lobo, Rebecca May, and Christy Stratton and directed by Kyounghee Lim. The episode also guest stars Ashley Gardner, Duff Goldman as himself, Ernie Grunwald, David Herman, Scott Klace, Phil LaMarr, and Geof Manthorne (credited as "Geoffry Manthorne") as himself.

== Reception ==
=== Ratings ===
In its original American broadcast, "To Sirloin with Love" was viewed by an estimated 6.11 million household viewers and received a 9/10 share in the 18-49 demographic.

=== Critical response ===
The episode received acclaim. In a review of the whole hour, James Poniewozik of Time gave the episode a positive review, saying, "It is one of the most moving things I've seen on TV this year. Hank, and Mike Judge: you've done right." Alan Sepinwall of The Star-Ledger gave the episode a positive review, saying, "Because the show was often content to go for knowing smiles rather than belly laughs, it became easy to take for granted over the years. In these final seasons, I would often let four or five episodes build up on the DVR before I got around to watching one -- yet I never felt dissatisfied when I put it on." Danny Gallagher of TV Squad gave the episode a positive review as well, writing: "The episodes didn't take the usual road to a long-running series finale by having the Hills pack up and move out of Arlen into the next phase of their lives or in some other predictable manner. It kept the characters honest, true and humble in their own unique ways and sent the audience off exactly where they started -- by being funny and fresh without being cheap or crass in their caricatures," and "It actually made me wish I was reviewing another season premiere instead of a series finale." Mike Moody of TV Squad said the episode was one of the best series finales of 2009.
