= A.U.S.A. =

2003 American TV series

- Genre: Sitcom
- Created by: Richard Appel
- Written by: Abraham Higginbotham; Warren Lieberstein; Halsted Sullivan; Judah Miller; Murray Miller
- Starring: Scott Foley; Amanda Detmer; Eddie McClintock; Ana Ortiz; Peter Jacobson; John Ross Bowie
- Composer: Roger Neill
- Country of origin: United States
- Original language: English
- No. of seasons: 1
- No. of episodes: 12 (4 unaired)

Production
- Executive producers: Richard Appel; Andrew D. Weyman; Jonathan Aibel; Glenn Berger; Amanda Lasher; Hugh Fink; Warren Lieberstein
- Producers: Shari Tavey; Robert Lloyd Lewis; Al Lowenstein; Scott Foley; Jeff Westbrook
- Camera setup: Multi-camera
- Running time: 30 minutes
- Production companies: Persons Unknown Productions; NBC Studios; 20th Century Fox Television

Original release
- Network: NBC
- Release: February 4 – April 1, 2003

A.U.S.A. is an American legal television sitcom created by Richard Appel, that aired on NBC from February 4 to April 1, 2003, starring Scott Foley.

== Plot ==
Adam Sullivan (Scott Foley) is a naive and well-intentioned federal prosecutor (an Assistant United States Attorney) in New York City, who must contend with the difficulties of both his work life and his romantic life. While being part of the Department of Justice, Sullivan finds both colleagues and opponents challenging his every move.

== Cast ==
- Scott Foley as Adam Sullivan
- Amanda Detmer as Susan Rakoff
- Eddie McClintock as Owen Harper
- Ana Ortiz as Ana Rivera
- Peter Jacobson as Geoffrey Laurence
- John Ross Bowie as Wally Berman

== Episodes ==
No.	Title	Directed by	Written by	Original release date	Prod. code
1	"Pilot"	Andrew D. Weyman	Richard Appel	February 4, 2003	1AGH01
2	"Rich Man, Poor Man"	Steve Zuckerman	Amanda Lasher	February 11, 2003	1AGH03
3	"12 Happy Grandmothers"	Linda Mendoza	Richard Appel	February 18, 2003	1AGH12
4	"Till Death Do Us Part"	Gail Mancuso	Jonathan Aibel and Glenn Berger	February 25, 2003	1AGH05
5	"The Joint Report... A Love Story"	Steve Zuckerman	Judah Miller & Murray Miller	March 4, 2003	1AGH09
6	"Walter's First Lawsuit"	Gail Mancuso	Abraham Higginbotham	March 11, 2003	1AGH06
7	"Sullivan, Rakoff & Associate"	Steve Zuckerman	Bryan Behar & Steve Baldikoski	March 18, 2003	1AGH08
8	"The Kiss"	Andrew D. Weyman	Abraham Higginbotham	April 1, 2003	1AGH07
9	"Top Secret"	Michael McDonald	Richard Appel	UNAIRED	1AGH02
10	"Witness Protection"	Henry Winkler	Richard Appel	UNAIRED	1AGH04
11	"Just Friends"	Fred Savage	Jeff Westbrook	UNAIRED	1AGH10
12	"Nothing But the Truth"	Michael McDonald	Hugh Fink	UNAIRED	1AGH11

== Reception ==
The show debuted on February 4, 2003, with an audience of 11.5 million viewers, ranking at #42 for the week.
