= Mother Simpson =

- The Simpsons episode
- Homer watching the stars after his mother leaves, often described as one of the most emotional scenes in the show's history.
- Episode no.: Season 7 Episode 8
- Directed by: David Silverman
- Written by: Richard Appel
- Production code: 3F06
- Original air date: November 19, 1995

Guest appearances
- Glenn Close as Mona Simpson; Harry Morgan as Bill Gannon

Episode features
- Couch gag: The Simpsons are set onto the couch like bowling pins.
- Commentary: Matt Groening; Bill Oakley; Josh Weinstein; David Silverman; Richard Appel

Episode chronology
← Previous "King-Size Homer"	Next → "Sideshow Bob's Last Gleaming"
- The Simpsons season 7

"Mother Simpson" is the eighth episode of the seventh season of the American animated television series The Simpsons. It first aired on Fox in the United States on November 19, 1995. After faking his own death to get a day off work, Homer reunites with his mother Mona, who he thought had died over two decades prior. It was directed by David Silverman and was the first episode to be written by Richard Appel. Glenn Close makes her first of eleven guest appearances as Homer's mother. This episode is dedicated to the memory of staff member Jackie Banks, who died on November 4, 1995.

== Plot ==
After learning that Mr. Burns wants his employees to clean litter from a highway maintained by his company on a Saturday, Homer fakes his own death using a dummy to avoid it. When Marge discovers his scheme the next day, she makes Homer go to the Springfield Hall of Records to explain he is not dead. There, Homer learns that his mother, whom he believed to have died 26 years prior, is still alive. Homer visits what he thinks is her grave, only to find that it belongs to Walt Whitman. After falling into a grave that had been dug for him, Homer is approached by a woman who chastises him for falling into her son's grave. Homer recognizes her as his mother Mona, and they share an emotional reunion.

Lisa soon bonds with her paternal grandmother, but notices Mona runs inside the house when a police car drives by. Suspicious, Lisa shares her concerns with Bart, who raided Mona's purse and found several driver's licenses with different names. Marge and Homer wonder why Mona left her son and never returned for 26 years. The family confronts Mona, who reveals the truth about her past. In 1969, Mona joined a group of hippies to protest a germ warfare laboratory owned by Mr. Burns, which was preparing to poison everyone in Springfield. The group detonated an "antibiotic bomb" inside the lab, killing all the germs in his lab (e.g., smallpox, diphtheria, typhoid, "rocking pneumonia" and "boogie-woogie influenza"). Mr. Burns was trampled by the hippies while attempting to stop them. When Mona went back to help Burns, she was recognized as one of the perpetrators, forcing her to leave Homer and his father Abe and go into hiding.

While Homer and Mona go to the post office to claim care packages sent by Mona, Burns recognizes Mona and calls the FBI, who track her to the Simpsons home. Before she can be arrested, Homer receives an anonymous tip that his mother is about to be arrested, and he helps her escape. The tipster is later revealed to be Chief Wiggum, who was a security guard at Burns' lab until the antibiotic mist cured his asthma and allowed him to finally enroll in the police academy. Realizing she must again go into hiding, Mona says goodbye to Homer and promises that he will be a part of her life forever. After her departure, Homer sits on the hood of his car watching the stars.

== Production ==
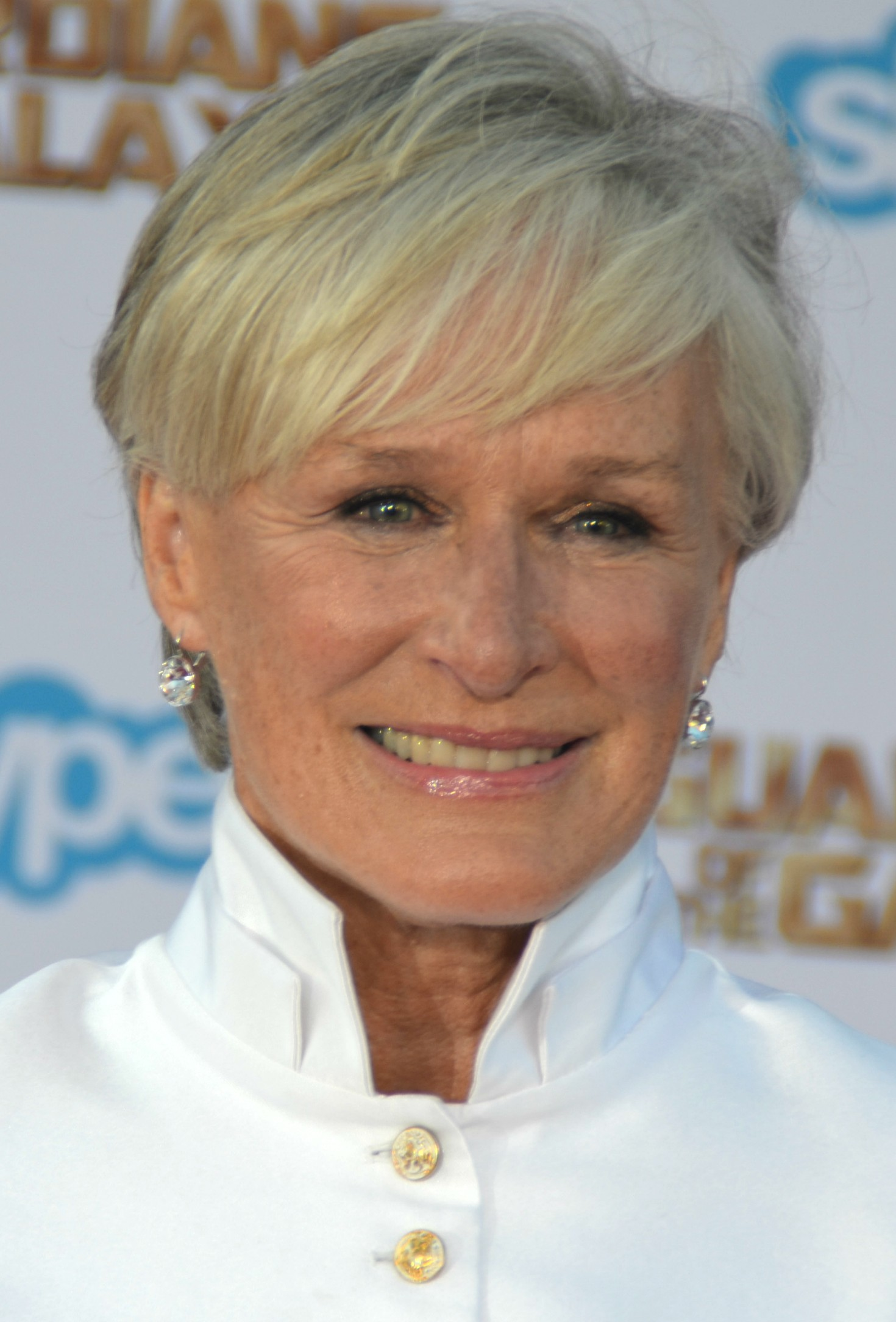
Glenn Close guest stars as Homer's mother

The idea for "Mother Simpson" was pitched by Richard Appel, who decided to do something about Homer's mother. She had previously had been mentioned in the episode "There's No Disgrace Like Home", and shown via flashbacks in "Oh Brother, Where Art Thou?" and "Grampa vs. Sexual Inadequacy". Many of the writers could not believe that an episode about Homer's mother had not previously been produced. Part of the fun of an episode about Homer's mother for the writers was that they were able to solve several little puzzles, such as where Lisa's intelligence came from. The ending shot with Homer gazing at the sky was decided at the table read, but the drawing at the end was inserted by David Silverman because it was felt that the scene was so touching that no other lines were needed. As a result, no promos were aired over the credits during the original airing of the episode. Bill Oakley has admitted that he always gets teary-eyed when he watches the ending.

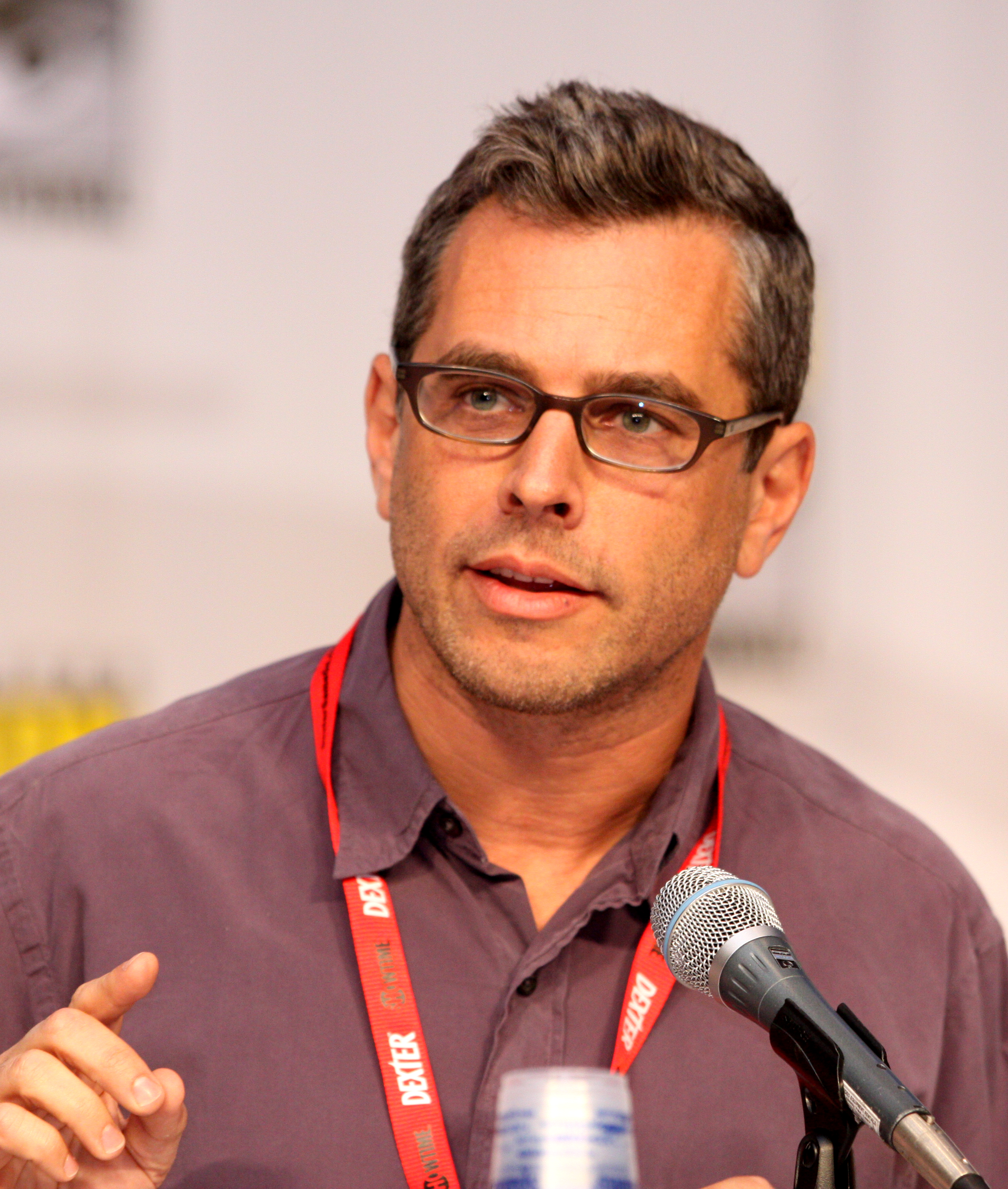
"Mother Simpson" was the first episode that Richard Appel wrote.

Glenn Close, who was directed by Josh Weinstein, was convinced to do the episode partially because of James L. Brooks. Mona Simpson was designed in a way so that she would somewhat resemble Homer in her face, such as the shape of her upper lip and her nose. There were several design changes because the directors were trying to make her an attractive older and younger woman, but still be Simpson-esque. The inspiration for the character comes from Bernardine Dohrn of the Weather Underground, although the writers acknowledge that several people fit her description. Mona Simpson's crime was intentionally the least violent crime the writers could think of, as she did not harm anyone and was only caught because she came back to help Mr. Burns. The character was named after Richard Appel's wife at the time, the novelist Mona Simpson. When Mona gets in the van, her voice is done by Pamela Hayden because Close could not say "d'oh!" properly and thus they used the original temp track recorded by Hayden.

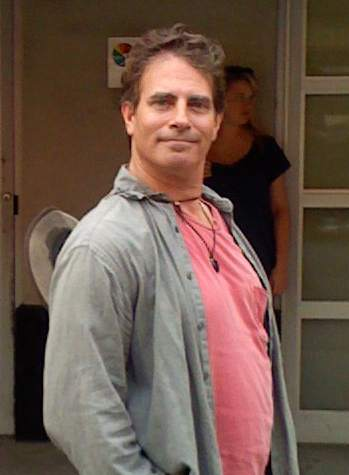
The episode was directed by David Silverman, who inspired the episode from the question the producers asked, "What about Homer's mom?".

The design of Joe Friday is based on his design in "Dragged Net!", a parody of Dragnet that was done in Mad Magazine in the 1950s. Mona becoming a radical after seeing Joe Namath's sideburns is a parody of how many 1960s films have a sudden transformational moment and play music such as "Turn! Turn! Turn!" and there was much discussion among the writers as to what that moment should be. The song originally intended to be taped over Mr. Burns' cassette of Richard Wagner's "Ride of the Valkyries" was "Wake Me Up Before You Go-Go" by Wham!, but it was too expensive to clear, so ABBA’s "Waterloo" was selected instead.

== Cultural references ==
"Mother Simpson" draws upon a number of references to 1960s popular culture. Three songs from the 1960s appear in this episode: "Sunshine of Your Love" by Cream, Bob Dylan's "Blowin' in the Wind", and Jimi Hendrix's cover of Dylan's "All Along the Watchtower". Mona Simpson is seen reading Steal This Book by Abbie Hoffman. Mona mentions that she worked a number of jobs while on the run, including "marketing Jerry Rubin’s line of diet shakes, proofreading Bobby Seale's cookbook, and running credit checks at Tom Hayden’s Porsche dealership." Rubin, Seale and Hayden were three left-wing radicals from the 1960s. Rubin did indeed have a line of diet shakes, and Seale did write some cookbooks. However, Hayden never owned a Porsche dealership.

The radicals use a Spiro Agnew alarm clock, which is based on a real item. When Mr. Burns drives a tank towards the Simpson house, he is wearing oversized headgear. This is a reference to a public relations stunt by Michael Dukakis during his campaign in the 1988 presidential election. Abraham Simpson briefly claims he was the actual Lindbergh Baby while trying to stall the FBI agents. When Mr. Burns plays a tape of "Ride of the Valkyries", it has been recorded over by Smithers with "Waterloo" by ABBA, a reference to Smithers' implied homosexuality and to the helicopter beach attack scene in Apocalypse Now, in which "Ride of the Valkyries" is famously played. Maggie is shown dancing in her diaper and covered in slogans in a pastiche of the filler scenes of Laugh-In in which Goldie Hawn and other female cast members like Ruth Buzzi and Jo Anne Worley danced in a bikini with slogans and drawings painted on their bodies. The two FBI agents are Joe Friday and Bill Gannon from Dragnet. Gannon is voiced by Harry Morgan, who played him in the 1960s version of the series.

== Reception ==
In its original broadcast, "Mother Simpson" finished 45th in ratings for the week of November 13–19, 1995, with a Nielsen rating of 10.0, equivalent to approximately 9.6 million viewing households. It was the fourth highest-rated show on the Fox network that week, following Beverly Hills, 90210, The X-Files, and Melrose Place.

"Mother Simpson" is one of Oakley and Weinstein's favorite episodes; they have called it a perfect combination of real emotion, good jokes, and an interesting story. In 1996, "Treehouse of Horror VI" was submitted for the Emmy Award in the "Outstanding Animated Program (For Programming less than One Hour)" category because it had a 3D animation sequence, which they felt would have given it the edge. A Pinky and the Brain Christmas eventually went on to win. Bill Oakley, speaking in 2005 on the DVD commentary for the episode, expressed regret about not submitting this episode and felt that it would have easily won had it been submitted. The joke about Homer's apparent familiarity with Walt Whitman is one of David Silverman's favorite jokes.

Gary Russell and Gareth Roberts, the authors of the book I Can't Believe It's a Bigger and Better Updated Unofficial Simpsons Guide, praised the episode, calling it "Gag-packed, and very touching".

IGN ranked Glenn Close's performance as the 25th best guest appearance in the show's history. In 2008, Entertainment Weekly named Close one of the 16 best The Simpsons guest stars.

In The A.V. Club, Erik Adams writes: "The conversation around The Simpsons’ seventh season often returns to the delicate balance of humor and heart that mark the season’s standout episodes. 'Mother Simpson' comes as close to perfecting that balance as any other half-hour from this production cycle, give or take 'Bart Sells His Soul.' It’s an episode of precision laughs and genuine warmth, qualities neatly summed up when Mona suggests that she and Homer simply bask in the moment of their reunion—a moment Homer naturally ruins. He praises Close's performance: "Close is an actress who disappears into her roles, and she effortlessly slips into Mona's convictions and regrets in her first outing as Simpson family matriarch. It's a funny, touching performance, but it's not showy in any way. In fact, it was the showiest bit of dialogue she just couldn't nail down: When Mona bonks her head at the end of the episode, the Simpson family's signature exclamation had to come from Pamela Hayden's scratch vocals. Close is so nuanced in her performance, she just couldn't muster the bombast for a proper 'doh!'"
