= Committed (American TV series) =

American TV sitcom (2005)

- Genre: Sitcom
- Created by: Eileen Heisler; DeAnn Heline
- Written by: Katy Ballard; Rob Bragin; Rodney Rothman; Bill Daly; Judah Miller; Murray Miller
- Starring: Josh Cooke; Jennifer Finnigan; Darius McCrary; Tammy Lynn Michaels; Tom Poston
- Composer: Douglas J. Cuomo
- Country of origin: United States
- Original language: English
- No. of seasons: 1
- No. of episodes: 13

Production
- Executive producers: DeAnn Heline; Eileen Heisler
- Camera setup: Multi-camera
- Running time: 30 minutes
- Production companies: Blackie and Blondie Productions; NBC Universal Television Studio

Original release
- Network: NBC
- Release: January 4 – March 15, 2005

Committed is an American television sitcom that aired on NBC as a midseason replacement from January 4 to March 15, 2005.

== Premise ==
The show stars Josh Cooke and Jennifer Finnigan and costarred Darius McCrary, Tammy Lynn Michaels, and Tom Poston. Cooke and Finnigan played two single and extremely eccentric New Yorkers who are subject to constant interference when they begin dating from their equally eccentric friends and Finnigan's roommate, known only as "Dying Clown" or "Clown" who was actually a clown, played by Tom Poston.

== Cast ==
=== Main ===
- Josh Cooke as Nate Solomon
- Jennifer Finnigan as Marni Fliss
- Darius McCrary as Bowie James
- Tammy Lynn Michaels as Tess
- Tom Poston as Clown

=== Recurring ===
- RonReaco Lee as Todd

== Episodes ==
No.	Title	Directed by	Written by	Original release date	Prod. code	U.S. ratings
1	"The Pilot Episode"	Gary Halvorson	DeAnn Heline & Eileen Heisler	January 4, 2005	101	7
2	"The Return of Todd Episode"	Gary Halvorson	Katy Ballard	January 6, 2005	104	7.6
3	"The Apartment Episode"	Gary Halvorson	Rodney Rothman	January 11, 2005	105	6.7
4	"The Tea Episode"	Steve Zuckerman	Bill Daly	January 13, 2005	106	7.1
5	"The Morning After"	Steve Zuckerman	Rob Bragin	January 18, 2005	103	3.9
6	"The Birthday Episode"	Mark Cendrowski	Judah Miller & Murray Miller	January 25, 2005	107	4.4
7	"The Snap Out of It Episode"	Terry Hughes	Justin Spitzer	February 1, 2005	108	4.8
8	"The Snow Episode"	Barnet Kellman	Rodney Rothman	February 8, 2005	109	4
9	"The Mother Episode"	Barnet Kellman	Katy Ballard	February 15, 2005	110	4
10	"The Statue Guy Episode"	Gary Halvorson	DeAnn Heline & Eileen Heisler	February 22, 2005	111	4.2
11	"The Burger Episode"	Gary Halvorson	DeAnn Heline & Eileen Heisler	March 1, 2005	102	4.3
12	"The Perfect Person Episode: Part 1"	Gary Halvorson	Bill Daly & Rob Bragin	March 8, 2005	112	4.2
13	"The Perfect Person Episode: Part 2"	Steve Zuckerman	DeAnn Heline & Eileen Heisler & Rob Bragin	March 15, 2005	113	3.5
