= Alfred Appel Jr. =

American professor, author and journal editor

- Born: January 31, 1934
- Died: May 2, 2009 (aged 75)

Academic background
- Education: Columbia University

Academic work
- Institutions: Northwestern University
- Main interests: Vladimir Nabokov
- Notable works: The Annotated Lolita

Alfred Appel Jr. (January 31, 1934 – May 2, 2009) was an American professor, author and journal editor noted for his investigations into the works of Vladimir Nabokov, modern art, and jazz modernism. He edited The Annotated Lolita, an edition of Nabokov's Lolita. He also authored four other books about Nabokov, literature and music.

As a student at Cornell University, Appel took a course from Nabokov. His education was interrupted by a stint in the Army, after which he completed his undergraduate education and PhD in English Literature at Columbia University in 1963.

After teaching at Columbia for a few years, he joined the faculty of Northwestern University, where he taught until his retirement in 2000. He died of heart failure. Appel was married until his death to Nina Appel, dean of Loyola University Chicago's law school from 1983 to 2004. They had two children, Karen Oshman and television writer and producer Richard Appel.
