= Richard Appel =

American writer and producer (born 1963)

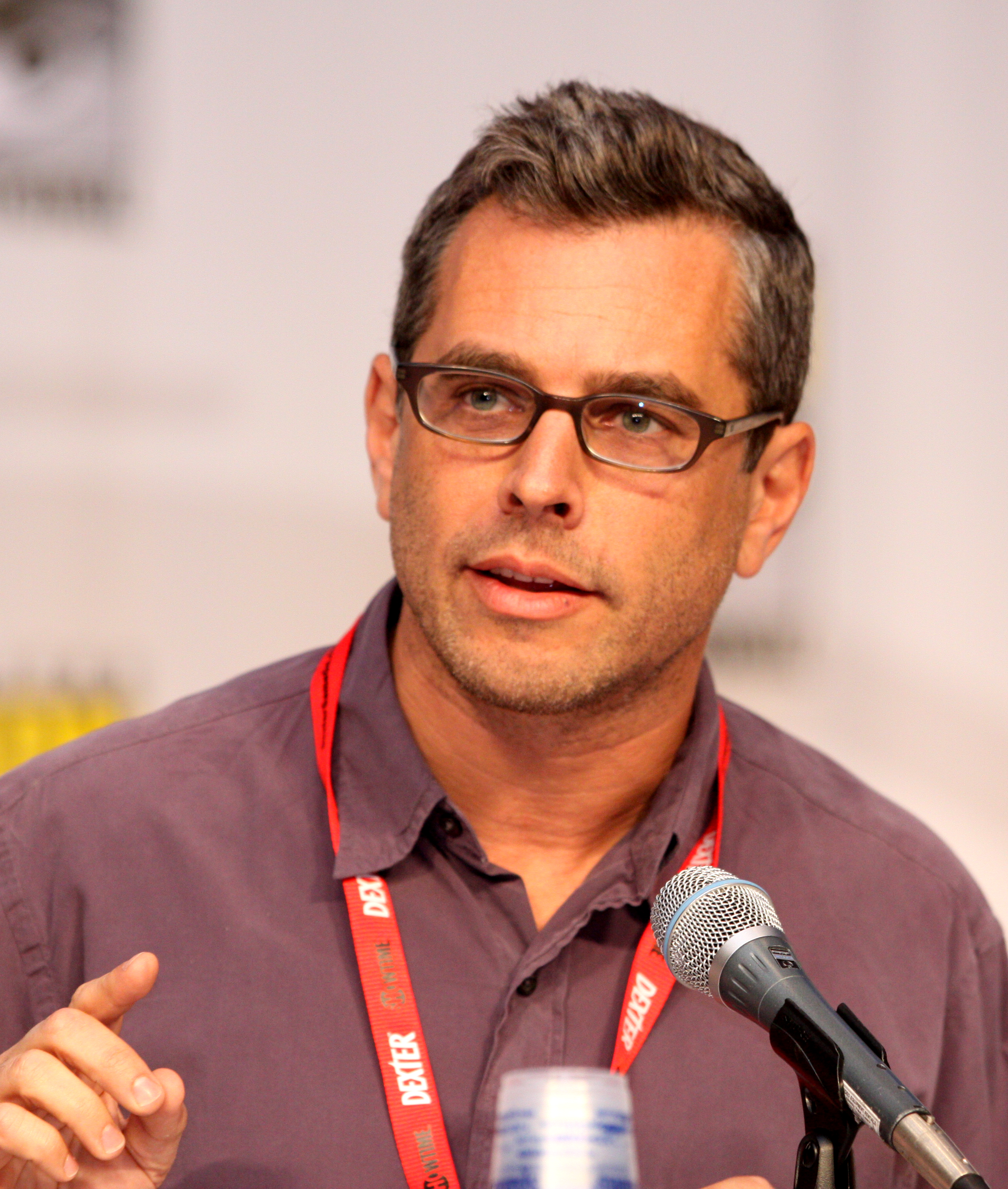
- Appel at the 2010 Comic Con
- Born: Richard James Appel; May 21, 1963 (age 63); New York City, New York, U.S.
- Education: Harvard University (BA, JD)
- Spouse: Mona Simpson (m. 1993; div. 2012)
- Children: 2
- Writing career
- Period: 1994–present
- Genre: Comedy

Richard James Appel (born May 21, 1963) is an American writer, producer and former attorney. Since 2012, he has served as an executive producer and co-showrunner of Family Guy on Fox. He attended Harvard University and Harvard Law School. As an undergraduate, he wrote for the Harvard Lampoon.

Following in his mother's footsteps, Appel became a lawyer. After attending law school, he started out as a law clerk for Judge John M. Walker Jr. before becoming a federal attorney, serving as assistant U.S. attorney for the United States District Court for the Southern District of New York for three years. In 1994, he moved into comedy writing when he was hired for The Simpsons, writing seven episodes of the show including "Mother Simpson". He moved on to become showrunner and executive producer of King of the Hill before creating the sitcom A.U.S.A.. He then worked on The Bernie Mac Show, Family Guy and American Dad! before co-creating The Cleveland Show. He was married to the writer Mona Simpson, noted author and sister of Steve Jobs.

== Early life and law career ==
Richard James Appel was born May 21, 1963, in New York City and raised in Wilmette, Illinois, to Nina (née Schick) and Alfred Appel. He is from a Jewish family.

His mother was a lawyer and served as dean of Loyola University Chicago's law school from 1983 to 2004, where as of 2010 she continued to teach tort law, and his father (who died on May 2, 2009) was professor of English at Northwestern University and an expert on Vladimir Nabokov. Appel has a sister, Karen Oshman.

Appel lived in California while his parents taught at Stanford University before the family moved to Wilmette, Illinois, where Appel went to North Shore Country Day School. While there, he co-wrote and co-edited his senior yearbook with writer and poet Philip Brooks. After leaving NSCDS, he attended Harvard University and wrote for the Harvard Lampoon, alongside Conan O'Brien and Greg Daniels, both of whom he beat for the chance to give the comic graduation speech, the Ivy Oration. Tad Friend noted: "Everyone thought it would be Conan automatically, but Rich's speech was funny and self-deprecating, in a way that was both silly and profound." After graduation in 1985 with a degree in history and literature, Appel attended Harvard Law School rather than moving into comedy, because the idea of following his mother and grandfathers into the legal profession "appealed" to him.

He then worked for two years as a law clerk for Judge John M. Walker, Jr., of the United States District Court for the Southern District of New York, working on the trials of people such as Michael Milken and Leona Helmsley. Subsequently, for three years from 1990, Appel served as an assistant U.S. attorney for the Southern District of New York. Fellow attorney Geoffrey Berman stated Appel "was an excellent lawyer. He was good on his feet, articulate, with a sense of the law that was common-sensical, more intuitive than based on books."

Appel still had dreams of becoming a comedy writer despite the security working as a lawyer offered him, but only in 1993, after his wife became pregnant, was Appel "reminde[d] that this was [his] life and [he] could shape it." Three months later he had retained an agent, had written and submitted two spec-scripts, and had moved to California.

== Writing career ==
"I don't think I opened my mouth for the first six weeks in that room. Part of it was my son had just been born. My son was, like most babies, not sleeping through the night, and there were some days where I didn't say anything not because I was intimidated but because I could barely focus."

— Appel on the start of his stint at The Simpsons

When starting out as a comedy writer, Appel recalled: "One reason I caught up to my contemporaries is that when I started to send out my scripts, the idea that I'd been on the Lampoon, even 8 or 10 years before, was a credential I could use." Appel got his first television job when David Mirkin hired him for the writing staff of The Simpsons in 1994, initially on a ten-week contract, and served as a writer and producer there for four years. There, he wrote seven episodes, often employing the use of "joke sequences, a narrative approach to humor that eschews the quick laugh in favor of something that develops over time."

Appel found work on The Simpsons to be a learning curve because it was a "very tough show to write for." His first episode was season seven's "Mother Simpson". Appel was desperately trying to think of a story idea to show and decided that he had to really reach out and opted to do something about Homer's mother, who previously had only been mentioned once. He named her Mona Simpson, after his wife. Many of the writers could not believe that an episode about Homer's mother had not previously been produced. The writers used the episode to solve several little puzzles, such as where Lisa's intelligence came from. Also for season seven he penned "Bart on the Road", in which he utilized the plot devices of "go to work with your parents day" and Bart getting a driving license, and contributed to the episode "22 Short Films About Springfield"; the two segments he wrote for the episode (one about Marge, the other about Lionel Hutz) were both cut.

Appel wrote two episodes from season eight, "Bart After Dark" and "The Secret War of Lisa Simpson", as well as season nine's "The Two Mrs Nahasapeemapetilons" and season 10's "When You Dish Upon A Star".

Daniels hired Appel as executive producer and showrunner on King of the Hill in 1997, leading the show's writing process and overseeing all aspects of the show. Daniels noted: "It was essential that Rich was a good writer who could deal with people, who could help manage the business in the room. But equally important was the fact that he was someone I could trust, who had a similar sense of taste and values." He stayed until 2001. For his work on The Simpsons and King of the Hill, Appel won three Primetime Emmy Awards.

Appel created the short-lived series A.U.S.A., which aired in 2003, which he based on his own experiences as an assistant U.S. attorney. He conceived it in 2001 and NBC ordered 13 episodes the following year; the show's original pilot used a single-camera setup but NBC executives felt it would have more appeal as a multiple-camera setup, so it was re-shot.

Appel then wrote and worked as a co-executive producer on The Bernie Mac Show and Kitchen Confidential, and appeared as Josh in the 2004 film I Heart Huckabees. In 2006, he produced a pilot called My Ex Life about two divorcing couples for CBS. The show was not picked up

In 2008, he served as a co-executive producer on Family Guy and executive producer on American Dad! from 2008 until 2009. Appel wrote the Family Guy seventh season episode "Family Gay".

Appel co-created, alongside Mike Henry and Seth MacFarlane, the Family Guy spin-off The Cleveland Show, which they began discussing in 2007 and which premiered September 27, 2009. He and Henry serve as the show's executive producers with limited involvement from MacFarlane. Henry and Appel conceived the show as "more of a family show, a sweeter show" than Family Guy.

Starting with the sixteenth season, Appel would begin showrunning Family Guy, alongside Alec Sulkin.

== Personal life ==
In 1993 he married novelist Mona Simpson, the sister of Apple founder Steve Jobs. They have two children. Appel and Simpson have since divorced.

== Credits ==
Appel worked on the listed shows and wrote all the listed episodes:

- The Simpsons (1994–98) – writer, producer, co-executive producer, staff writer and story editor
  - "Mother Simpson" (1995)
  - "Bart on the Road" (1996)
  - "22 Short Films About Springfield" (co-writer) (1996)
  - "Bart After Dark" (1996)
  - "The Secret War of Lisa Simpson" (1997)
  - "The Two Mrs. Nahasapeemapetilons" (1997)
  - "When You Dish Upon a Star" (1998)
- King of the Hill (1997–2001) – executive producer
- A.U.S.A. (2003) – creator, executive producer, writer
  - "Pilot"
  - "12 Happy Grandmothers"
- The Bernie Mac Show (2003–05) – co-executive producer, writer
  - "Eye of the Tiger"
  - "That Old Mac Magic"
  - "Stiff Upper Lip"
  - "Nerdy Mac"
- I Heart Huckabees (2004) – actor
- Kitchen Confidential (2005–06) – co-executive producer, writer
  - "Praise Be Praise"
  - "Let's Do Brunch"
- My Ex Life (2006) – creator, executive producer, writer
- Family Guy (2008–09, 2013– ) – co-executive producer, writer, executive producer, showrunner
  - "Family Gay"
- American Dad! (2008–09) – executive producer
- The Cleveland Show (2009–13) – co-creator, executive producer, writer
  - "Pilot"
