= Nina Appel =

American lawyer

Nina S. Appel (born February 17, 1936) was the first female dean of Loyola Law School, known for her commitment to ethical education and her passion for torts law.

== Biography ==
Nina Schick Appel was born in Prague on February 17, 1936, to Leo and Nora (Thein) Schick. Her family was Jewish. She earned her undergraduate degree at Cornell where she met Alfred Appel, whom she went on to marry in 1957. She went on to graduate Columbia Law School in 1959, by dual enrolling as an undergrad, graduating in the same class as Ruth Bader Ginsburg. After graduating she lived in Palo Alto and lectured and designed courses at Stanford University. While living in Palo Alto, she had two children, Karen and Richard Appel. In 1973, she was hired at Loyola University Chicago School of Law by dean Charles R. Purcell as a law teacher, and she immediately began to teach in torts, administrative law, products liability, and evidence. Specifically, she was interested in different aspects of torts law: third party actions, products liability, and medial law. In 1976, she was promoted to full professor and then to associate dean by dean Charles W. Murdock, whom she would eventually succeed as dean. She was the unanimous choice of the search committee in 1983, when she was appointed the dean of Loyola Law School despite being a woman in a male-dominated field and Jewish at a Jesuit institution. She served as the dean until 2004, when she took the title of dean emerita. As dean, she was given many honors and awards, served on many important committees and panels (including as the chair of the ABA section on Legal Education from 1992–93), and fought to educate lawyers so that they could properly defend and help disadvantaged communities. She retired as dean emerita on April 26, 2018.
