= Tammy Lynn Michaels =

American actress

- Occupation: Actress
- Years active: 1999–present
- Partner(s): Melissa Etheridge (cp. 2003; sep. 2010) (registered domestic partnership)
- Children: 2

Tammy Lynn Michaels, also known by the surname Etheridge from her relationship with Melissa Etheridge, is an American actress.

Michaels portrayed mean girl Nicole Julian on The WB's Popular.

== Career ==
Michaels landed the role of Nicole Julian on Popular.

In 2002, Michaels had a recurring role on the Fox show That '80s Show playing Roger's equally materialistic girlfriend followed by a guest appearance in 2004 on the Showtime drama The L Word. In 2005, she played the character Tess on the NBC series Committed.

In 2003, Michaels played the role of Max in the short-film D.E.B.S.. The film received several awards and later was expanded to a feature-length film of the same name and released in 2004. However, most of the actresses in the original D.E.B.S. were replaced for the expanded version, including Michaels.

== Personal life ==
Michaels identifies as lesbian.

She started dating singer Melissa Etheridge in 2001. The couple had a commitment ceremony in September 2003 and they became registered domestic partners in 2005.

On April 15, 2010, Michaels and Etheridge confirmed that they had ended their nearly nine-year relationship. In May 2012 it was announced that their two-year child support battle had been settled.

Since 2005, Michaels has kept a blog, in which she discusses politics, current events and her personal life.

== Filmography ==
Film and television
Year	Title	Role	Notes
1999-2001	Popular	Nicole Julian	Main role
2002	That '80s Show	Patty	"Double Date", "Beach Party", "Sophia's Depressed"
2003	D.E.B.S.	Max	short film
2004	The L Word	Lacey Haraway	"Pilot", "Let's Do It Again", "Longing"
2005	Committed	Tess	
2019	Heartstrings	Bitsy	episode: "Cracker Jack"
