= Death Picks Cotton =

- King of the Hill episode
- Episode no.: Season 12; Episode 5
- Directed by: Tony Kluck
- Written by: Murray Miller; Judah Miller
- Production code: BABE14
- Original air date: November 11, 2007

Episode chronology
← Previous "Four Wave Intersection"	Next → "Raise the Steaks"
- King of the Hill season 12

"Death Picks Cotton" is the fifth episode of the twelfth season of the animated television series King of the Hill, and the 218th episode overall. It was written by Murray Miller and Judah Miller and directed by Tony Kluck. The episode features the death of Hank's father, Cotton Hill. It aired on the Fox network on November 11, 2007, during Veterans Day.

== Plot ==
Hank and the guys are building a new shed, since Dale had blown up Hank's old shed. Cotton shows up and kicks the shed down in disapproval over it not being as good as the one he built back in World War II. Lucky and Luanne are talking about a restaurant, a teppanyaki steakhouse à la Benihana, where they are planning on eating that night. Bobby isn't allowed to go since the night out is for adults only, and Cotton volunteers to stay and watch Bobby. Peggy leaves Bobby a lasagna in the fridge to heat up for dinner later; Cotton refuses to eat the lasagna cold but will neither allow Bobby to heat it up nor do it himself, since they are both men. Cotton instead drives Bobby (at night, without glasses or a license, and using a mop to reach the pedals) to the restaurant to join his family for dinner.

They arrive at the restaurant, but Cotton doesn't want anything to do with it since the restaurant is Japanese. He gets into an altercation with the chef at their table, even though the chef only speaks Spanish. During the fight, the chef accidentally flicks a shrimp into Cotton's mouth, causing him, who is revealed to be allergic to shellfish, to slip on the grill and burn himself. The doctors don't think Cotton is going to make it, and Hank refuses to believe them. He goes home to rebuild the shed his father knocked down. Dale visits Cotton in the hospital and learns that Cotton's last wish is to knock down Hank's shed one more time. Lucky and Luanne take Bobby in while Cotton is in the hospital so that they can practice being parents. It doesn't go well. Dale tries to knock down Hank's shed, but only hurts his shoulder. Hank wants to know what he's doing and Dale tells him about his father's last wish. Hank realizes that if his father is making a last wish then he must really be dying, so Hank heads to the hospital where he tells his father he loves him. Cotton taunts him for this, so Hank tells him he does not love him. Just then, Cotton flatlines and Hank rushes out of the room just as the doctors rush in to work on their coding patient.

Back home, Peggy is telling Hank that it's okay because Cotton had made his life hell when they get a call from the hospital informing them that Cotton is still alive, which offers Hank a second chance to tell his father that he does love him. When Hank tries, however, Cotton flips out on him and Hank leaves the room. Peggy then gives Cotton a piece of her mind and tells him that she hopes he lives forever in the hell he has created on earth for her and Hank and is always in pain. Cotton, after saying "Do ya, now?" and laughing at Peggy's statement, finally dies. Hank comes back in the room and Peggy lies and tells him that Cotton had told her that he loved Hank before he died; in reality, he described Hank as a "worthless nothing-of-a-loser son."

Later, back in Hank's yard, Hank places a plaque on the door of the newly rebuilt shed dedicating it to "Cotton Hill: American". Just when everyone stands back to admire the shed, Dale blows it up as a tribute to Cotton.

== Production ==
In the lead-up to the episode, Fox published the following obituary for Cotton:

Cotton Hill, age unknown, World War II veteran, died Sunday in a Texas VA hospital. Hill suffered from several injuries ranging from four rusty bullets lodged in his back (one in his heart) from his military service, a broken hip and torn ligaments in his ankle-knees, to an infection in his esophagus and severe burns caused by a freak shrimp accident that occurred earlier this week at Tokyaki's Japanese restaurant. Hill leaves behind sons Hank Hill and G.H. (short for "Good Hank"); daughter-in-law Peggy Hill; grandson Bobby Hill; ex-wife Tilly; second wife Didi; first love and former Japanese lover Michiko; an illegitimate Japanese son, Junichiro; and nephew Dusty Hill (of band ZZ Top).

== Cultural references ==
- Bobby dances to the Pussycat Dolls' "Don't Cha".
- The scene where Bobby and Lucky roll down a hill in a tractor tire is a reference to an episode of Beavis and Butt-Head, another show created by Mike Judge.
