= Stacked =

- Created by: Steven Levitan
- Starring: Pamela Anderson; Elon Gold; Brian Scolaro; Marissa Jaret Winokur; Christopher Lloyd
- Composers: Steve Hampton; John Adair
- Country of origin: United States
- Original language: English
- No. of seasons: 2
- No. of episodes: 19 (5 unaired)

Production
- Executive producers: Steven Levitan; Jeffrey Richman; Cory Myler
- Producers: Pamela Anderson; Kevin C. Slattery
- Camera setup: Multi-camera
- Running time: 30 minutes
- Production companies: Steven Levitan Productions; 20th Century Fox Television

Original release
- Network: Fox
- Release: April 13, 2005 – January 11, 2006

Stacked is an American television sitcom that aired on Fox from April 13, 2005, to January 11, 2006.

== Premise ==
Stacked was described as the opposite of Cheers, instead of a smart person in a "dumb" place, it is based on the concept of a dumb person in a "smart" place. A workplace, ensemble comedy, Stacked revolves around Skyler Dayton (Pamela Anderson), who is tired of her non-stop partying lifestyle and bad choices in boyfriends. Wanting a major life change, she wanders into Stacked Books - a small, family-run bookstore in the San Francisco area - owned by Gavin Miller (Elon Gold) and his brother, Stuart (Brian Scolaro).

Divorced and unlucky in love himself, Gavin's inclined to regard Skyler as an embodiment of the vacuous, image-obsessed culture he has come to abhor. Stuart, however, is dazzled by Skyler's beauty and, much to Gavin's horror, offers her a job at their store, which she happily accepts as the first step in her quest for a steadier lifestyle. The store's sole other employee, Katrina (Marissa Jaret Winokur), is unhappy to work next to an intimidating bombshell, and doles out doses of realism and cynicism. Rounding out the characters is the store's one steady customer, Harold March (Christopher Lloyd), a preeminent, but retired, rocket scientist.

== Cast and characters ==
- Pamela Anderson as Skyler Dayton
- Elon Gold as Gavin P. Miller, who is divorced and unlucky in love
- Brian Scolaro as Stuart Miller, Gavin's younger brother, who has a master's degree in psychology
- Marissa Jaret Winokur as Katrina, who works at the store's coffee counter. She feels threatened by Skyler's presence. She is also chronically unlucky, having grown two sets of wisdom teeth, found herself knocked out while behind stage at an Aerosmith concert, and is always late for work.
- Christopher Lloyd as Professor Harold March, a regular customer to whom Katrina always reveals her nefarious plans. Skyler loves to play with his hair. He is always reading the newspaper. His presence commands gravitas, but whenever he speaks, he sounds like a crazy man.

== The bookstore ==
All of the books seen in the show are provided by HarperCollins, which, like Fox, is owned by NewsCorp. Books that are prominently displayed are based on The New York Times Best Seller list. Some titles seen include State of Fear, Don Quixote, The Known World, and Anansi Boys.

The entire bookstore is one main set, though there are three central areas: the coffee shop, the cash register, and the back office, which has a door. There are stairs on the set next to the coffee shop, but it is unknown where they lead. There is also an elevator near the magazine racks, behind the coffee shop.

== Episodes ==
=== Series overview ===
Season	Episodes	Originally released	
Season	Episodes	First released	Last released
1	5	April 13, 2005	May 18, 2005
2	14	November 9, 2005	January 11, 2006

=== Season 1 (2005) ===
No. overall	No. in season	Title	Directed by	Written by	Original release date	Prod. code	U.S. viewers (millions)
1	1	"Pilot"	Steven Levitan	Steven Levitan	April 13, 2005	1AKM78	8.30
Skyler enlists the bookstore gang's help in ending her relationship with her philandering rock-star boyfriend while, begrudgingly, Gavin asks Skyler to return the favor to make his ex-wife jealous.
2	2	"Beat the Candidate"	Lee Shallat Chemel	Heide Perlman	April 20, 2005	1AKM02	7.47
After falling asleep on the job, Skyler is replaced by Brent, a true know-it-all, but she returns after deciding that he made a mistake in firing her. Convinced by Stuart to give her another chance, Gavin allows both Skyler and Brent to work for a day, and afterwards, one must go.
3	3	"A Fan For All Seasons"	Lee Shallat Chemel	Stephen Lloyd	April 27, 2005	1AKM03	11.17
Comments about Skyler being a "groupie" come back to haunt Gavin when he proves to be one himself. Meanwhile, Skyler tries to get Katrina in to see her favorite band and Harold tries to make amends for telling Stuart he has no chance of ever being with Skyler.
4	4	"Gavin's Pipe Dream"	Scott Ellis	Murray Miller & Judah Miller	May 11, 2005	1AKM04	10.75
When Gavin reveals that he had a sex dream about Skyler, it upsets the delicate balance of the entire bookstore and throws it into a sexually charged tailspin.
5	5	"The Ex-Appeal"	Gail Mancuso	Chris Harris	May 18, 2005	1AKM05	11.57
When Gavin volunteers to retrieve Skyler's grandfather's watch from her ex-boyfriend, Eddie, he ends up getting sucked in by Eddie's charms himself. Skyler attempts to get her mind off Eddie by attending a knitting group, headed by Katrina, and finds that the company of women is quite different from her expectations.

=== Season 2 (2005–06) ===
No. overall	No. in season	Title	Directed by	Written by	Original release date	Prod. code	U.S. viewers (millions)
6	1	"Nobody Says I Love You"	Lee Shallat Chemel	Steven Levitan & Cory C. Myler	November 9, 2005	2AKM04	5.05
Skyler tells everyone in the bookstore that she loves them, but not Gavin. Harold thinks it's because she's infected with a life-threatening illness, while Katrina thinks she just wants money. Kid Rock guest stars.
7	2	"Two Faces of Eve"	Lee Shallat Chemel	Jeffrey Richman	November 16, 2005	2AKM07	5.40
Skyler reunites with an old friend, Eve (Jenny McCarthy), who she hasn't seen in a very long time. To her surprise, Eve looks completely different from how she did at their previous meeting, and is planning a wedding. Eve then asks Skyler to be her maid of honor.
8	3	"Darling Nikki"	Lee Shallat Chemel	Paul Corrigan & Brad Walsh	November 30, 2005	2AKM05	5.05
Skyler's old rival Nikki Foos attempts to use Stuart to get even with her. Carmen Electra guest stars as Nikki.
9	4	"Crazy Ray"	Scott Ellis	Judah Miller & Murray Miller	December 7, 2005	2AKM03	5.07
A member of Gavin’s former writing club publishes a critically acclaimed novel, inspiring Gavin to write one of his own. Skyler and the others don’t think it's good.
10	5	"iPod"	Lee Shallat Chemel	Dan Signer & Stephen Lloyd	December 14, 2005	2AKM06	4.32
Skyler finds a woman's iPod at the bookstore. Gavin dates the 23-year-old who lies about more than just her age.
11	6	"Heavy Meddle"	Bob Koherr	Sam Johnson & Chris Marcil	December 21, 2005	1AKM06	4.10
Skyler thinks that Harold is lonely, so she attempts to fix him up on a date. Meanwhile, Katrina has a run-in with an Asian health inspector who thinks she's a racist.
12	7	"Goodwizzle Hunting"	Lee Shallat Chemel	Steven Levitan	December 28, 2005	2AKM01	3.78
It is Katrina's birthday, and she keeps trying to attract the attention of a handsome customer. To keep her happy, Skyler throws a western "Hoedown" and invites the customer. When he doesn't show up, Katrina becomes upset, and Stuart "cheers her up". Meanwhile, Skyler cleans out Gavin's closet.
13	8	"After Party"	Scott Ellis	Jeffrey Richman	January 4, 2006	2AKM02	4.09
Gavin finds out that Stuart and Kat have been sleeping together.
14	9	"Romancing the Stones"	Lee Shallat Chemel	Stephen Lloyd & Dan Signer	January 11, 2006	2AKM08	4.31
When Gavin experiences all the symptoms for gallstones, he decides to get surgery. When the nurse gives numbing drugs, Gavin tells Skyler he loves her—and it wasn't just the drugs talking!
15	10	"You're Getting Sleepy"	Lee Shallat Chemel	Judah Miller & Murray Miller	Unaired	2AKM09	N/A
Harold’s daughter Zoey visits the bookstore with her hypnotist boyfriend. Skyler urges Harold to give the guy a chance, but then she becomes conflicted about her own advice.
16	11	"The Third Date"	Lee Shallat Chemel	Paul Corrigan & Brad Walsh	Unaired	2AKM10	N/A
Harold's daughter Zoey and Gavin are on their third date, and the pressure to have sex with each other is put on him by Skyler and Katrina. So Harold talks to Gavin encouraging him to do so.
17	12	"The Day the Music Died"	Lee Shallat Chemel	Dan Signer	Unaired	2AKM11	N/A
A musician opens a music store next to Stacked Books. He plays the music so loud, customers are starting to take their business elsewhere. Gavin, Stuart, and Skyler all go over and try to stop him.
18	13	"Poker"	Sheldon Epps	Judah Miller & Murray Miller	Unaired	2AKM12	N/A
Gavin's son Owen needs a new suit and a haircut for an interview at a conservative private school. Gavin can't take Owen because he is a finalist in an online poker tournament, so Skyler volunteers. When Gavin's ex-wife Charlotte returns to pick her son up, she is shocked by his new appearance.
19	14	"Headmaster"	Lee Shallat Chemel	Paul Corrigan & Brad Walsh	Unaired	2AKM13	N/A
Skyler tries to make things right with Gavin and Charlotte by going on a date with a boring headmaster (John Benjamin Hickey). Harold realizes he has been missing out on six years of free coffee by not participating in the bookstore's card stamping system.

== Home media ==
On December 12, 2006, 20th Century Fox Home Entertainment released the complete series on DVD. The set contains all 19 episodes, including the five not originally aired.
