= Judah Miller =

American producer and writer (born 1973)

- Born: Judah Menachem Miller; November 14, 1973 (age 52); California, United States
- Education: Monte Vista High School
- Occupations: Producer, writer
- Years active: 2002–present
- Spouse: Marissa Jaret Winokur (m. 2006)
- Children: 1
- Family: Geneva Wasserman (sister); Murray Miller (brother)

Judah Menachem Miller (born November 14, 1973) is an American television producer and writer. Miller has produced and written for Clone High (2002–03, 2023–24), The Tracy Morgan Show (2003), A.U.S.A. (2003), Committed (2005), Stacked (2005), King of the Hill (2006), American Dad! (2010), Axe Cop (2012), Crashing (2017), and Bupkis (2023).

== Early life ==
Miller was born to a Jewish family, the son of Zoe and Gary Miller. He is a graduate of Monte Vista High School in Danville, California. He has a twin sister, Geneva Miller Wasserman and one brother, writer Murray Miller. He started his career as a production assistant in Los Angeles.

== Personal life ==
On October 7, 2006, Miller married Marissa Jaret Winokur. They have one son, Zev Isaac Miller (born 2008).

== Filmography ==
=== Television ===
Year	Title	Role
2023	Bupkis	Executive producer/showrunner (8 episodes)
2017	Crashing	Executive producer (5 episodes), Co-executive producer (2 episodes), Writer (1 episode)
2015	All Stars	Executive producer and writer
2013–2015	Axe Cop	Developer
2014	Playing House	Executive producer (7 episodes) and writer (2 episodes)
2010–2013	American Dad!	Co-executive producer (70 episodes), Supervising producer (13 episodes), Writer (9 episodes)
2007–2008	King of the Hill	Producer (13 episodes), Co-producer (6 episodes), Supervising producer (1 episode), Writer (5 episodes)
2005–2006	Stacked	Co-producer (13 episodes), Writer (4 episodes)
2005–2006	Committed	Writer (1 episode)
2004	2004 MTV Movie Awards	Writer
2003	The Tracy Morgan Show	Writer (3 episodes)
2003, 2023–2024	Clone High	Co-executive producer (11 episodes), Staff writer (13 episodes) and writer (3 episodes)
2003	A.U.S.A.	Writer (1 episode)

== Awards and nominations ==
Year	Award	Category	Nominee(s)	Crew Roll	Result
2008	Primetime Emmy Awards	Outstanding Animated Program (For Programming Less Than One Hour)	King of the Hill ("Death Picks Cotton")	Writer	Nominated
2012	Primetime Emmy Awards	Outstanding Animated Program	American Dad! ("Hot Water")	Co-executive producer, Writer	Nominated
