= Murray Miller =

American television writer and producer (born 1976)

- Born: Murray Selig Miller; December 2, 1976 (age 49); California, U.S.
- Other name: Murry Miller
- Education: Monte Vista High School; New York University
- Occupations: Television writer, producer
- Years active: 2000–present
- Spouse: Crystal Meers (m. 2016)
- Relatives: Judah Miller (brother)

Murray Selig Miller (born December 2, 1976) is an American television writer and producer. Miller has produced and written for many television programs, including King of the Hill, American Dad!, Girls, 7 Days in Hell (2015) and Tour de Pharmacy (2017). He was hired to write on the MTV movie awards in 2019 after he was accused of the rape of a minor, and several of the other writers on the show spoke out.

== Early life and career ==
Miller was born to a Jewish family, the son of Gary and Zoe Miller. He has one sister, Geneva Wasserman, and one brother, writer and producer Judah Miller, who is married to Marissa Jaret Winokur. Miller is a graduate of Monte Vista High School in Danville, California, and attended New York University where he was roommates with Andy Samberg.

Miller started his career as a stand-up comedian in New York City. in 2019, seemingly his last IMDb credit was the MTV movie awards in which several other writers spoke to news sources about their disappointment in sharing a credit with him.

== Personal life ==
On March 19, 2016, Miller married writer Crystal Meers.

=== Allegation of rape ===
On November 17, 2017, actress Aurora Perrineau (daughter of actor Harold Perrineau) filed a police report with the Los Angeles County Sheriff's Department alleging Miller, then age 35, had raped her in 2012 when she was age 17. Miller has denied the accusation. On August 10, 2018, after an investigation, the Los Angeles County District Attorney's Office formally declined to file charges against Miller by reason of the statute of limitations for prosecution of statutory rape had passed, and further declined prosecution for rape on any other grounds due to "inconsistencies which cannot be overcome" and the delay in reporting the case.

Lena Dunham, a longtime Miller collaborator, spoke out to say Miller had changed his story multiple times and to apologize to the victim.

After falsely saying that Perrineau had demanded money, Miller's lawyers publicly retracted their defamatory statement.

== Filmography ==
=== Television ===
Year	Title	Role	Notes
2002–2003	Clone High	Staff writer, writer and actor	15 episodes
2003	A.U.S.A.	Writer	1 episodes
2003–2004	The Tracy Morgan Show	Story editor and writer	17 episodes
2005	Committed	Executive story editor and writer	8 episodes
2005–2006	Stacked	Co-producer, executive story editor and writer	13 episodes
2006–2008	King of the Hill	Producer, co-producer, supervising producer and writer	21 episodes
2010–2013	American Dad!	Co-executive producer, supervising producer, writer and voice actor	78 episodes
2013–2017	Girls	Executive producer, co-executive producer, writer and actor	52 episodes
2015	7 Days in Hell	Executive producer and writer	TV movie
2017	Tour de Pharmacy	Executive producer and writer	TV movie
2018	Crashing	Consulting producer	8 episodes

== Awards and nominations ==
Year	Award	Category	Nominee(s)	Crew Roll	Result	Ref
2008	Primetime Emmy Awards	Outstanding Animated Program (For Programming Less Than One Hour)	King of the Hill ("Death Picks Cotton")	Writer	Nominated	
2012	Primetime Emmy Awards	Outstanding Animated Program	American Dad! ("Hot Water")	Co-executive producer, writer	Nominated	
2013	Primetime Emmy Awards	Outstanding Comedy Series	Girls	Co-executive producer	Nominated	
