= Jim Dauterive =

American animation producer and writer

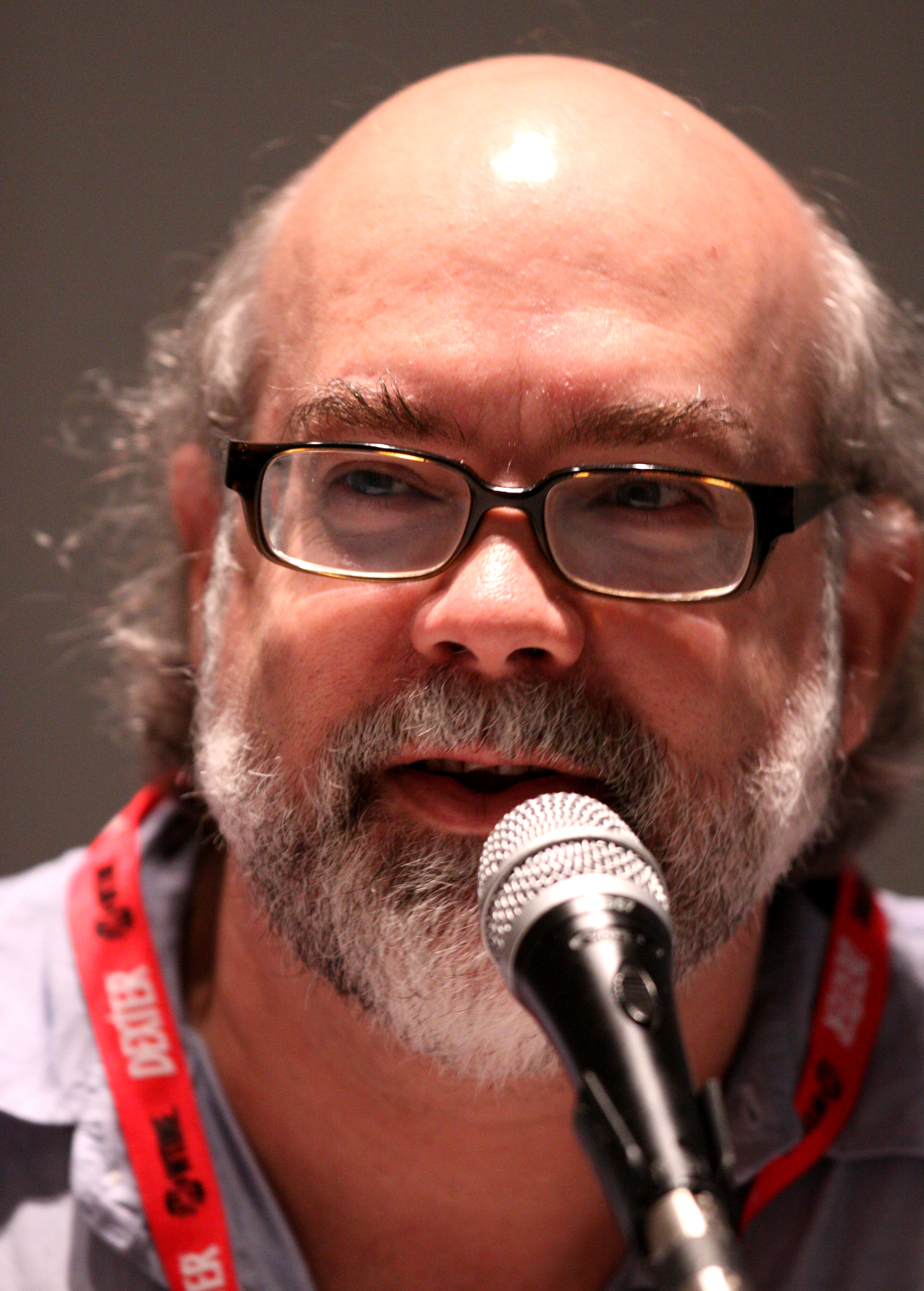
- Dauterive at the 2010 San Diego Comic-Con.
- Born: James Thomas Dauterive; June 22, 1957 (age 69); Dallas, Texas, U.S.
- Education: University of Texas; Harvard University
- Occupations: Television writer, producer
- Years active: 1997–present

James Thomas Dauterive (/doʊˈtriːv/; born June 22, 1957) is an American animation producer and writer, widely known for his work on King of the Hill (1997–2010) and Bob's Burgers (2011–present).

== Personal life ==
Dauterive was born on June 22, 1957. Like his namesake character on King of the Hill, William Fontaine de la Tour "Bill" Dauterive, his family is of Louisiana Cajun origin. He has served on the Board of Trustees for Bridges Academy since 2017.

== King of the Hill ==
After a ten-year career as an advertising copywriter in Philadelphia, Dauterive joined King of the Hill as a writer at its inception in 1996. He was also an executive producer on the show and wrote multiple episodes, including: "Strangeness on a Train", "The Redneck on Rainey Street", "Glen Peggy Glen Ross", "To Sirloin with Love" (co-writer), "What Happens at the National Propane Gas Convention in Memphis Stays at the National Propane Gas Convention in Memphis", "The Son That Got Away", "The Company Man", "Snow Job" (co-writer), "Junkie Business", "Nine Pretty Darn Angry Men", "Hank's Cowboy Movie", "A Beer Can Named Desire", "Church Hopping", "The Trouble with Gribbles", "Hanky Panky" and "The Perils of Polling".
