= Geof Manthorne =

American chef

Geoffrey Manthorne (born April 25, 1974), more commonly known as Geof, is an American chef known for his skill in cake building, as well as decorating. He stars on the Food Network's reality-TV show Ace of Cakes and works as executive sous chef at Duff Goldman's bakery Charm City Cakes in Baltimore, Maryland.

Manthorne also competed with Goldman in the Halloween Haunted House Food Network Challenge and judged the Extreme Cakes competition with Goldman and Mary Alice Fallon-Yeskey. He met Duff by being in the same music social group and through Mary Alice's brother, Neil Fallon, the lead singer of the band Clutch.
