= King of the Hill =

American animated sitcom

- Genre: Animated sitcom; Comedy drama; Slice of life
- Created by: Mike Judge; Greg Daniels
- Developed by: Mike Judge; Greg Daniels; Saladin K. Patterson (Note: Season 14–present)
- Showrunners: Mike Judge; Greg Daniels; Richard Appel; Jonathan Aibel; Glenn Berger; John Altschuler; Dave Krinsky; Saladin K. Patterson
- Voices of: Mike Judge; Kathy Najimy; Pamela Adlon; Brittany Murphy; Johnny Hardwick; Stephen Root; Toby Huss; Ashley Gardner; Jonathan Joss; Lauren Tom; Breckin Meyer; Tom Petty; Ronny Chieng; Tai Leclaire; Keith David
- Theme music composer: The Refreshments
- Opening theme: "Yahoos and Triangles"
- Ending theme: "Yahoos and Triangles" (reprise) by The Refreshments (seasons 1–13); "Yahoos and Triangles" performed by Billy Strings (season 14–present)
- Composers: Roger Neill; John O'Connor; Greg Edmonson; John Frizzell; Chuck Mangione
- Country of origin: United States
- Original language: English
- No. of seasons: 15
- No. of episodes: 279 (list of episodes)

Production
- Executive producers: Mike Judge; Greg Daniels; Richard Appel; Jonathan Aibel; Glenn Berger; John Altschuler; Dave Krinsky; Jim Dauterive; Garland Testa; Howard Klein; Michael Rotenberg; Saladin K. Patterson; Dustin Davis; Norm Hiscock
- Producers: Mark McJimsey; David Zuckerman; Eli Dolleman
- Editors: Lee Harting; Kirk Benson; Don Barrozo; Mark Seymour; Mark McJimsey; Leo Papin; Louis Russel; Nick Gribble
- Running time: 20–25 minutes
- Production companies: Bandera Entertainment (season 14–present); 3 Arts Entertainment; Deedle-Dee Productions; Judgmental Films; 20th Television (seasons 1–13); 20th Television Animation (season 14–present)

Original release
- Network: Fox; First-run syndication
- Release: January 12, 1997 – May 6, 2010
- Network: Hulu
- Release: August 4, 2025 – present

King of the Hill is an American animated sitcom created by Mike Judge and Greg Daniels that initially aired on Fox from January 12, 1997, to September 13, 2009, with four more episodes airing in syndication from May 3–6, 2010. The show was later revived on Hulu and Disney+ on August 4, 2025.

The series follows the Hills, an American family who live in the fictional city of Arlen, Texas, as well as their neighbors, co-workers, relatives, classmates, friends, and acquaintances. The show's realistic approach seeks humor in the conventional and mundane aspects of everyday life, blue-collar workers, family conflicts, and the trials of puberty.

Judge began creating King of the Hill during his time making the MTV series Beavis and Butt-Head, which he also created and voiced. After pitching the pilot to Fox, Judge was paired with Greg Daniels, an experienced writer who previously worked on The Simpsons. The series debuted on the Fox network as a midseason replacement in 1997, before episodes of The Simpsons and The X-Files, quickly becoming a success. The show became one of Fox's longest-running series, with a total of 259 episodes over the course of its 13 seasons. Four episodes from the final season were planned to air on Fox, but later premiered in nightly syndication in May 2010. The show would later be revived in August 2025 with 10 extra episodes, with the current total of 279 episodes.

King of the Hill was met with widespread acclaim and is widely regarded as one of the greatest animated shows of all time. The series has won two Emmy Awards and has been nominated for seven. Its celebrity guest stars include Chuck Mangione, Tom Petty, Texas Governor Ann Richards, Brad Pitt, Jennifer Aniston, Alan Rickman, Lucy Liu, Ben Stiller, Big Boi, Kathleen Turner, Meryl Streep, Matthew McConaughey, Sydney Pollack, Michael Keaton, Paul Butcher, Johnny Depp, Milla Jovovich, Brendan Fraser, Dax Shepard, Justin Long, Paul F. Tompkins, and numerous country music artists including Randy Travis. The show airs on FXX to this day.

On January 18, 2022, Judge and Daniels announced the formation of a new company called Bandera Entertainment, with a revival of King of the Hill being one of several series in development. On January 31, 2023, Hulu announced it had picked up the revival for two seasons. The revival premiered on August 4, 2025, with the new season airing on Hulu and Disney+ with Hulu. On October 30, 2025, Hulu renewed the series for two more seasons. The 15th season premiered on July 20, 2026.

== Premise and characters ==
=== Premise ===
The Hill family in the show's original run: From the left: Peggy (back), Bobby, Hank, and their dog, Ladybird.

King of the Hill depicts an "average" family and their lives in a typical American town. It documents the Hills' day-to-day-lives in the small Texas town of Arlen, exploring themes such as parent–child relationships, friendship, loyalty, and justice.

Unlike many adult animated sitcoms, e.g. Family Guy, the show uses a simple slice-of-life format and humorously mundane content. Critics have praised King of the Hill for its sense of humanity shown throughout the show.

=== Characters ===
Cast members
Mike Judge	Kathy Najimy	Pamela Adlon	Brittany Murphy	Johnny Hardwick	Stephen Root	Toby Huss
Hank Hill, Jeff Boomhauer, Stuart Dooley, additional voices	Peggy Hill	Bobby Hill, Clark Peters, Chane Wassanasong (s.4–12), Donna, Additional voices	Luanne Platter (s. 1–13), Joseph Gribble (s. 1–4), Additional voices	Dale Gribble (s. 1–14), Additional voices	Bill Dauterive, Buck Strickland, Additional voices	Kahn Souphanousinphone, Sr. (s. 1–13), Ted Wassanasong (s. 4–13), Cotton Hill, Joe Jack, Dale Gribble (s. 14–present), Additional voices

King of the Hill is set in the fictional small town of Arlen, Texas. The show centers on the Hill family, headed by the ever-responsible, hard-working, honest, but emotionally stunted propane salesman Hank Hill (Mike Judge). The punning title refers to Hank as the head of the family, as well as metaphorically to the children's game king of the hill. He often finds his traditional conservative values challenged by the changing world around him, though his common decency usually sees him through. Hank typically serves as the de facto leader for his friends and family.

His wife Peggy Hill, née Platter (Kathy Najimy), a native of Montana, begins the series as a substitute Spanish teacher, though she has a poor grasp of the language. She pursues numerous other careers throughout the show's run. She is confident, frequently to the point of lacking self-awareness.

Hank and Peggy's only child is twelve year old Bobby Hill (Pamela Adlon), a student at Tom Landry Middle School. Much to the chagrin of his football-loving father, Bobby has little interest in athletics and instead aspires to become a "prop comic".

Throughout a good share of the series, Peggy's naive and emotional niece named Luanne Platter (Brittany Murphy), lives with the Hill family while her mother is in jail. Luanne attends beauty school and hosts a Christian-themed puppet show for a local cable-access TV station. She eventually finds employment and moves into a house on the same street as the Hill family, remaining very close to them. She engages in a relationship with and marries Elroy "Lucky" Kleinschmidt (Tom Petty), a snaggle-toothed lay about, who lives on the settlement he has earned from a frivolous lawsuit.

Hank has a healthy relationship with his mother, Tilly (Tammy Wynette, later Beth Grant and K Callan), a kind woman who moved to Arizona after divorcing Hank's father Cotton Hill (Toby Huss). In contrast, Hank has a strained relationship with his father, a cantankerous World War II veteran who lost his shins to Japanese machine gun fire and verbally abused Tilly during their marriage. Cotton later marries Didi (Ashley Gardner), a young candy striper, and they have a son, "G.H." ("Good Hank"), who bears a striking resemblance to Bobby.

Dale Gribble (Johnny Hardwick; later Huss) is the Hills' chain-smoking, balding, conspiracy-theorist, next-door neighbor. He is married to Nancy Hicks-Gribble (Gardner), a weather reporter known for her good looks and charm. Dale is unaware that their only child, Joseph (Murphy, later Breckin Meyer, and later Tai Leclaire), is not his biological son, and is instead the result of Nancy's 14-year-long affair with John Redcorn (Victor Aaron; later Jonathan Joss), a Native American healer who has given her therapeutic massages for her "headaches" for years. Despite his inclination for conspiracy theories, Dale seems to be the only one in town unaware of the affair. His neighbors decide to keep Nancy's secret to preserve Dale and Joseph's loving relationship.

Bill Dauterive (Stephen Root) lives across from the Hills. Known as the "Billdozer" in his high-school football glory days, Bill is now overweight, bald, and clinically depressed, still struggling to get over his divorce from his ex-wife Lenore. He is a sergeant and barber in the Army. He idolizes Hank and pines for Peggy, often trying to insert himself in the family. His intense loneliness makes him gullible and desperate for attention.

Jeff Boomhauer (Judge) is an easy-going philanderer most notable for his unique speech pattern. Most of Boomhauer's lines are long-winded and meandering, delivered very quickly through a mumble and a very thick Texan accent. While the characters understand him just fine, the audience isn't necessarily meant to. His given name and occupation are not revealed until the end of the 13th season.

In the series' first season, the Souphanousinphones, a Laotian-American family, move in next door to the Hills. The family consists of the materialistic Kahn (Huss; later Ronny Chieng), his class-conscious ex-wife Minh (Lauren Tom), and their tween daughter, Kahn "Connie" Jr. (Tom).

Kahn – who has a lucrative office job – is often at odds with his neighbors, believing them to be "hillbillies" and "rednecks" due to their lower socioeconomic status. Minh befriends Peggy and Nancy, though she still sees herself as superior to them. Connie has been pushed by her father to become a child prodigy and excels at a variety of things from academics to music, though she still finds plenty of time to be a kid despite the stress. She forms a close relationship with Bobby Hill, frequently hanging out with him and Joseph Gribble.

Other minor characters include Buck Strickland (Root), Hank's licentious boss at Strickland Propane; Joe Jack (Huss) and Enrique (Danny Trejo), Hank's co-workers at Strickland; Carl Moss (Dennis Burkley; later Root), Bobby's principal at Tom Landry Middle School; and Reverend Karen Stroup (Mary Tyler Moore in her debut appearance, and then Ashley Gardner in regular appearances), the female minister of Arlen First Methodist.

== Canadian Broadcast ==
King of the Hill's original run (1997–2009) aired nationally across Canada on the Global Television Network, which simulcasted Fox’s Sunday night lineup in Canada

== Episodes ==
Season	Episodes		Originally released		
Season	Episodes		First released	Last released	Network
1	12		January 12, 1997	May 11, 1997	Fox
2	23		September 21, 1997	May 17, 1998	Fox
3	25		September 15, 1998	May 18, 1999	Fox
4	24		September 26, 1999	May 21, 2000	Fox
5	20		October 1, 2000	May 13, 2001	Fox
6	22		November 11, 2001	May 12, 2002	Fox
7	23		November 3, 2002	May 18, 2003	Fox
8	22		November 2, 2003	May 23, 2004	Fox
9	15		November 7, 2004	May 15, 2005	Fox
10	15		September 18, 2005	May 14, 2006	Fox
11	12		January 28, 2007	May 20, 2007	Fox
12	22		September 23, 2007	May 18, 2008	Fox
13	24	20	September 28, 2008	September 13, 2009	Fox
13	24	4	May 3, 2010	May 6, 2010	First-run syndication
14	10		August 4, 2025		Hulu
15	10		July 20, 2026		Hulu

== Production ==
=== Conception ===
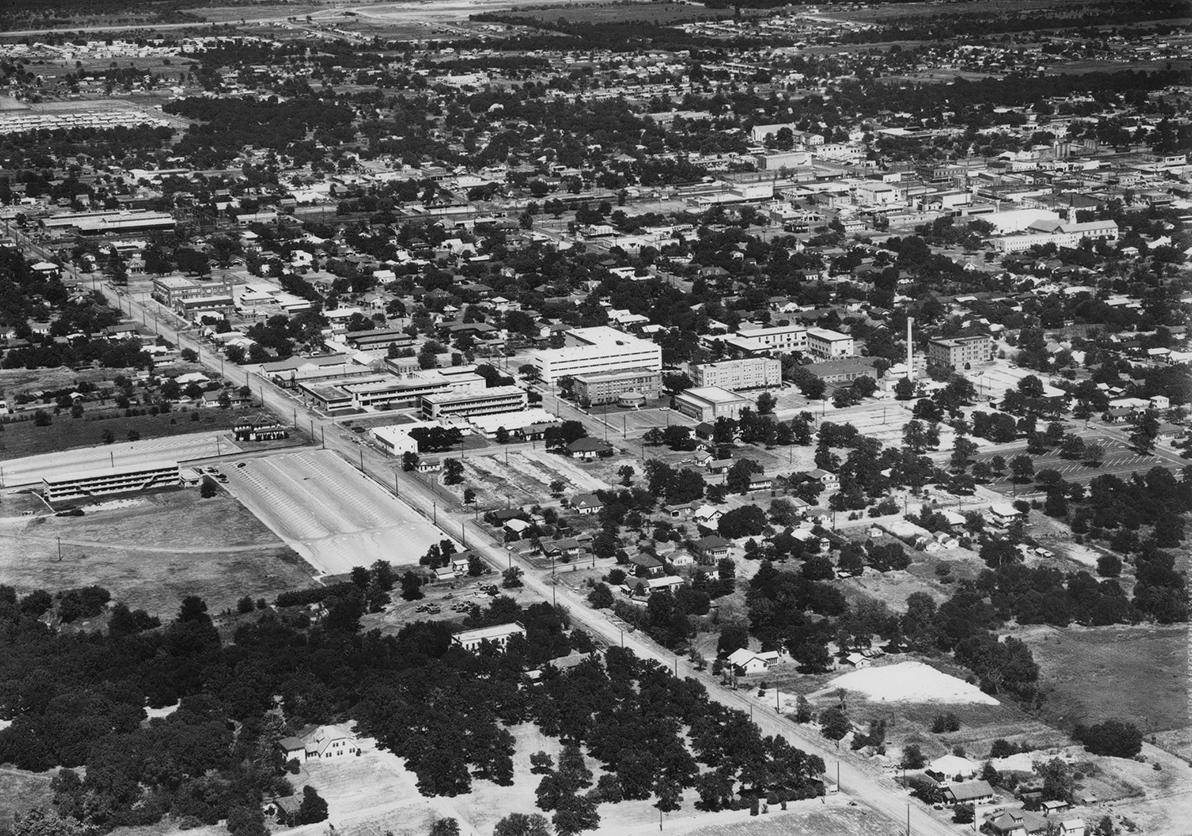
The design of King of the Hill was based on Texas suburbs from the 1950s, such as Arlington.

In early 1995, during the successful first run of Beavis and Butt-Head on MTV, its creator Mike Judge decided to create another animated series, this one set in a small Texas town based on an amalgamation of Dallas suburbs, including Garland, where he had lived, and Richardson. Judge conceived the idea for the show, drew the main characters, and wrote a pilot script.

The Fox Broadcasting Company was uncertain of the viability of Judge's concept for an animated comedy based in reality and set in the American South, so the network teamed the animator with Greg Daniels, an experienced primetime TV writer who had previously worked on The Simpsons. Daniels rewrote the pilot script and created important characters who did not appear in Judge's first draft, including Luanne and Cotton. Daniels also reworked some of the supporting characters (whom the pair characterized as originally having been generic, "snaggle-toothed hillbillies"), such as making Dale Gribble a conspiracy theorist. While Judge's writing tended to emphasize political humor, specifically the clash of Hank Hill's social conservatism and interlopers' liberalism, Daniels focused on character development to provide an emotional context for the series' numerous cultural conflicts. Judge was ultimately so pleased with Daniels' contributions, he chose to credit him as a co-creator, rather than give him the "developer" credit usually reserved for individuals brought onto a pilot written by someone else.

=== Initial success ===
After its debut, the series became a large success for Fox and was named one of the best television series of the year by various publications, including Entertainment Weekly, Time, and TV Guide. For the 1997–1998 season, the series became one of Fox's highest-rated programs and even outperformed The Simpsons in the ratings that season, ranking 15th with an average of 16.3 million viewers per episode. During the fifth and sixth seasons, Mike Judge and Greg Daniels became less involved with the show. They eventually refocused on it, even while Daniels became increasingly involved with other projects.

=== Format change ===
Showrunners throughout the series' run
Season	Showrunners
1–2	Mike Judge and Greg Daniels
3–4	Greg Daniels and Richard Appel
5	Richard Appel
6	Jonathan Aibel and Glenn Berger
7–13	John Altschuler and Dave Krinsky
14–	Saladin K. Patterson

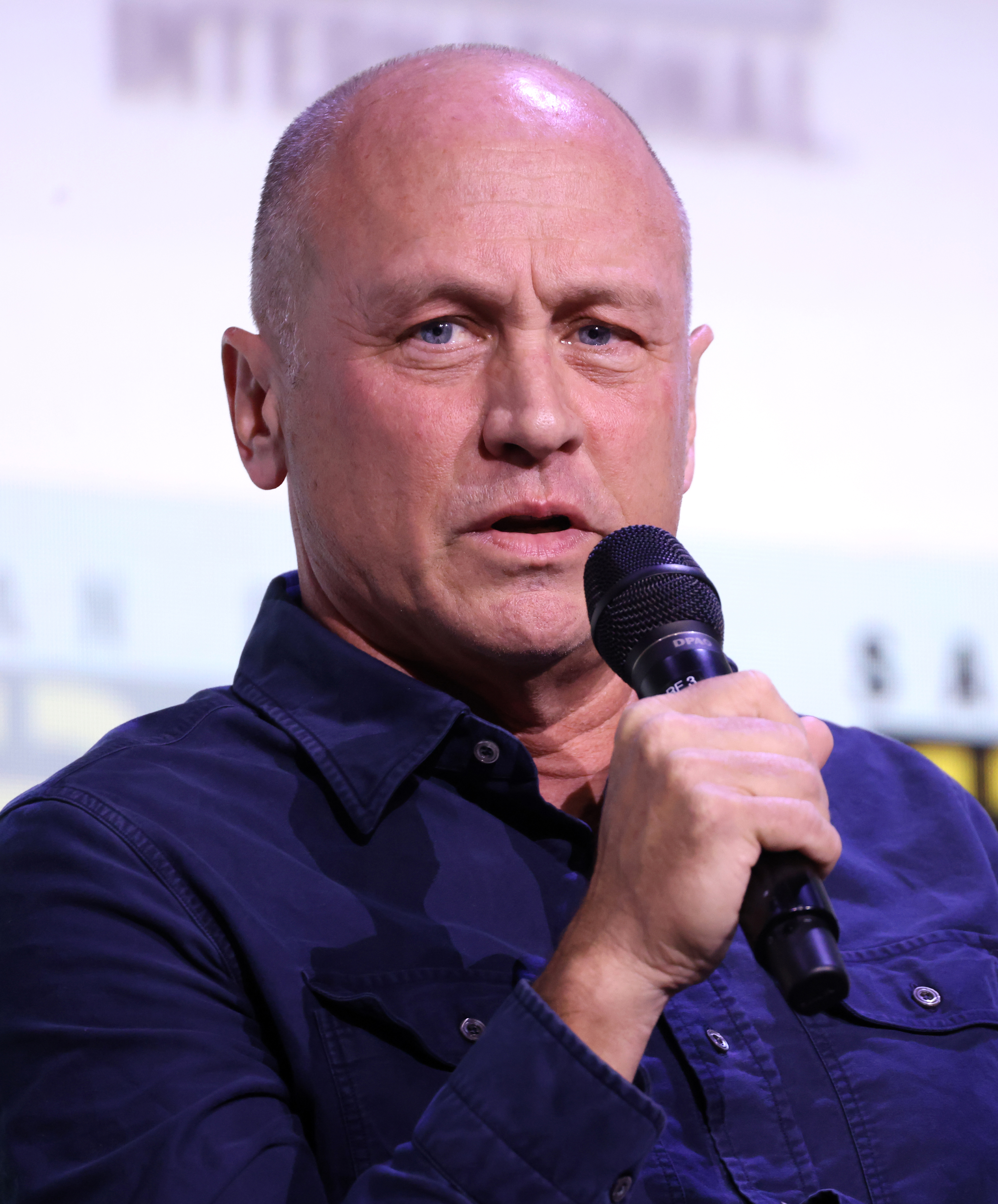
Over time, series co-creator Mike Judge reduced his role in episode production.

Judge and Daniels' reduced involvement with the show resulted in the series' format turning more episodic and formulaic. Beginning in season seven, John Altschuler and Dave Krinsky, who had worked on the series since season two, took it over completely, tending to emphasize Judge's concept that the series was built around sociopolitical humor rather than character-driven humor. Although Fox insisted that the series lack character development or story arcs (a demand made of the network's other animated series, so that they can be shown out of order in syndication), Judge and Daniels had managed to develop minor arcs and story elements throughout the early years of the series, such as Luanne's becoming more independent and educated after Buckley's death, and the aging of characters being acknowledged (a rare narrative occurrence for an animated series).

=== Connection to Bless the Harts ===
Bless the Harts, an animated series created for Fox, loosely shares a universe with King of the Hill, and features the Mega-Lo-Mart in the show. Story editors Christy Stratton and Emily Spivey for King of the Hill are involved in the show, although Judge is not. It premiered on September 29, 2019, and ended on June 20, 2021, due to Fox canceling the series after two seasons.

=== Facing cancellation ===
Because it was scheduled to lead off Fox's Sunday-night animated programming lineup, portions of King of the Hill episodes were often preempted by sporting events that ran into overtime (the show was preempted more often than not by NFL football); in season nine especially, whole episodes were preempted. Ultimately, enough episodes were preempted that the majority of the series's 10th season—initially intended to be the final season—consisted of unaired ninth-season episodes. The 11th season was also meant to be the last, with a planned finale televised before it was renewed.

The 13th-season episode "Lucky See, Monkey Do" became the first episode of the series to be produced in widescreen high definition when it aired on February 8, 2009.

==== Cancellation ====
Although ratings remained consistent throughout the 10th, 11th, and 12th seasons and had begun to rise in the overall Nielsen ratings (up to the 105th-most watched series on television, from 118th in season 8), Fox abruptly announced in 2008 that King of the Hill had been canceled, which coincided with the announcement that Seth MacFarlane, creator of Family Guy and American Dad!, would be creating a Family Guy spin-off called The Cleveland Show, which would take over King of the Hill's time slot.

Hopes to keep the show afloat surfaced as sources indicated that ABC (which was already airing Judge's new animated comedy, The Goode Family) was interested in securing the rights to the show, but in January 2009, ABC president Steve McPherson said he had "no plans to pick up the animated comedy".

On April 30, 2009, it was announced that Fox ordered at least two more episodes to give the show a finale. The show's 14th season was originally supposed to air sometime in the 2009–2010 season, but Fox later announced that it would not air the episodes, opting instead for syndication. On August 10, 2009, however, Fox released a statement that the network would air a series finale on September 13, 2009.

=== Revival ===
In August 2017, Judge and Daniels were revealed to have talked with Fox executives about a potential revival. In an interview with Rotten Tomatoes the following March, Judge said he would want the revived series to include aged characters, such as an older Bobby. In March 2020, Daniels revealed that Judge and he had an idea for the reboot. Daniels stated: "We do have a plan for it and it's pretty funny. So maybe one day." In March 2021, writer Brent Forrester stated that a reboot was currently underway, stating in a tweet: "I am sure Greg Daniels and Mike Judge will murder me for sharing this but... HELL YES. They are in hot negotiations to bring back King of the Hill." The reboot will possibly feature "aged-up characters".

In January 2022, Judge and Daniels announced the formation of a new company called Bandera Entertainment, with a revival of King of the Hill being one of several series in development.

During a panel at Comic-Con 2022, Judge stated that the show "has a very good chance of coming back". In September 2022, Fox Entertainment president Michael Thorn confirmed that the series would not air on Fox, with the reason being that Fox, which had split away from rights holder 20th Television Animation following the acquisition of 21st Century Fox by Disney, prefers to have full ownership of whatever new shows they air.

On January 31, 2023, a revival on Hulu was officially confirmed to be ordered. Judge, Najimy, Root, Adlon, and Tom were all expected to reprise their roles. With Murphy and Petty's deaths, how the characters of Luanne and Lucky would be handled was not announced, and whether Huss would return as Kahn was unknown. On May 1, 2023, Root had stated that the new revival would also have a time jump taking place years after the series finale where Bobby is "older". Hardwick was also confirmed to reprise his role as Dale Gribble, but died in August 2023 before any new episodes made it to air. Later, Hardwick was revealed to have recorded six episodes prior to his death.

To promote the revival, the San Antonio-based Alamo Beer Co. would be partnering with Hulu to release King of the Hill-inspired Alamo Beer, which launched in 2025 and was sold at H-E-B grocery stores throughout Texas. An additional promotional deal was struck with Whataburger which also included product placement. Before the second revival season premiered, commemorative cans of WD-40 were sold nationwide at The Home Depot; a memorable scene from the original run depicted Hank Hill using a small can of the lubricant mounted to a holster on his belt to undo the lid of a regular-sized can.

A first-look poster for the new series was revealed online on May 14, 2025. Its premiere date of August 4, 2025, was revealed, as well as the show's updated opening credits sequence featuring adult Bobby, during a panel at the ATX Television Festival in Austin's Paramount Theater on May 30 that featured the cast and crew, including Judge, Daniels, Patterson, Adlon, Tom, and Huss. The same day, Judge and Daniels were reported to be executive producing the revival with showrunner Saladin Patterson, Michael Rotenberg and Howard Klein of 3 Arts, and Dustin Davis of Judge and Daniels' Bandera Entertainment, while Judge, Kathy Najimy, Pamela Adlon, Johnny Hardwick, Stephen Root, Lauren Tom, and Toby Huss would also return as voice actors. Huss would also replace Hardwick as the voice of Dale Gribble from in the third and eighth episode of the 14th season onwards.

On June 1, 2025, Jonathan Joss, John Redcorn's second voice actor, who was slated to return to the show, was shot and killed by a neighbor, following a confrontation outside his home in San Antonio, Texas. How the production team would move forward from this point is currently unclear. However, People noted afterwards that Joss did manage to return for the revival and had recorded lines for four episodes prior to his death. All ten episodes of season 14 premiered on Hulu on August 4, 2025. On August 26, 2025, it was reported that season 15 would premiere in 2026.

Originally, the revival was only expected to last two seasons. However, on October 30, 2025, it was announced that Hulu had renewed the series for seasons 16 and 17, and had ordered 20 additional episodes to stream after the conclusion of season 15. If the series continues to release ten episodes per year on Hulu, this renewal would take the show through 2028. The 15th season premiered on July 20, 2026.

== Setting and opening sequence ==
=== Opening sequence ===
In the opening sequence, Hank joins Dale, Bill, and Boomhauer in the alley behind his house. When he opens his can of beer, the playback speed increases greatly and depicts other main and secondary characters carrying out various daily activities around them in a time-lapse. Meanwhile, the four continue drinking beer and a nearby recycling bin fills with their empty cans. When Peggy brings a bag of garbage out to Hank, the other three leave and the playback returns to normal speed (which was sped up for the first half of the last few seconds of the introduction from seasons 4–13) as he takes it to the trash can and gathers with Peggy and Bobby in a parody of American Gothic. In the 14th season, the introduction has been changed to serve as a compressed time lapse of the events that occurred in between the 13th and 14th seasons, while maintaining the same increased playback speed and a similar start and end compared to the original.

The opening theme, "Yahoos and Triangles", is performed by Arizona rock band The Refreshments. Variations of the theme are used for special episodes, including season finales and Christmas episodes.

=== Setting ===
King of the Hill is set in the fictional town of Arlen, Texas, an amalgamation of numerous Dallas–Fort Worth suburbs, including Garland, Richardson, Arlington, and Allen. In addition to drawing inspiration from the DFW region, Judge has described Arlen as "a town like Humble" (a suburb of Houston). Time magazine praised the authentic portrayal as the "most acutely observed, realistic sitcom about regional American life bar none". In the episode "Hank's Cowboy Movie", the town's entrance sign lists its population as 145,300. It is the seat of Heimlich County; neighboring towns include McMaynerbury, Durndle, and New Hoffenscheim.

Though Arlen is inspired by various Texas suburban communities, its specific location in Texas is never specified in the series. Similar to the location of Springfield on The Simpsons, the location of Arlen within Texas is arbitrarily based on the needs of a particular episode's plot, and multiple episodes give conflicting information as to Arlen's geographic location within the state. For example, one episode indicates that it is just north of the Brazos River in central Texas. Other episodes place it near Houston or Dallas, while others feature trips to Mexico and back taking place within a matter of hours. In the episode "Harlottown", the location is revealed to be somewhere on the Chisholm Trail. In all cases, the general location for Arlen coincides with the eastern half of the state as opposed to the western half, the latter being predominantly desert.

The Hills and other major characters reside on Rainey Street. Hank's friend and neighbor Bill Dauterive is a barber at Fort Blanda, a small army post near Arlen. Most of the children in the show attend Tom Landry Middle School; other schools depicted are Arlen High (home of the Longhorns) and Staubach Elementary. Early in the series, the school is referred to as being in the Heimlich County School District (according to markings on the school buses), though in later seasons, this is changed to Arlen Independent School District in line with how school districts in Texas are generally named. The school's mascot is a longhorn steer.

== Reception ==
=== Critical response ===
King of the Hill received critical acclaim over its 13-year run. Early reviews of the show were positive, and it was named as one of the best new shows of 1997 by Entertainment Weekly, Time and TV Guide. Diane Holloway at the Chicago Tribune considered it the "most Texan television series since Dallas" and praised the show's "sly sense of humor and subversive sensibility". At the Los Angeles Times, writer Howard Rosenberg suggested that the show "totes a few smiles, but [there's] little to bowl you over, and it takes a spell getting used to". The show's first season received an approval rating of 87% on review aggregator Rotten Tomatoes, based on 31 reviews with an average rating of 7.3/10. Its consensus reads: "King of the Hill's mild yet extremely funny depiction of small-town Texas life is refreshingly worlds away from conventional prime-time animation." The fifth and thirteenth seasons received more critical praise with a 100% approval rating. The fourteenth season revival received similar critical acclaim. On Rotten Tomatoes, 98% of reviews from 48 critics were positive with an average rating of 8.60/10 and its consensus reads: "Dang it Bobby! King of the Hill is back and still as flavorful as barbecue grilled with propane in a revival season that deftly brings these characters into the modern era."

In 2007, James Poniewozik included it on Time's list of the 100 Greatest TV Shows, writing: "The most acutely observed, realistic sitcom about regional American life bar none, this animated series is a lot like its protagonist, Texas propane salesman Hank Hill: it isn't flashy, never gets a lot of attention, but does its job year in and year out... Mike Judge makes Hank Hill funny in his pained Boy Scout rectitude without making him a figure of fun for it, and with its canvas of mega-stores and Laotian yuppies, the show sees modern America's fine detail like an electron microscope." At the show's conclusion, Poniewozik opined that it had "quietly been the best family comedy on TV", calling the show's ending "one of the most moving things I've seen on TV this year". Alan Sepinwall of The Star-Ledger described it as "sweeter and more human than the great majority of live-action sitcoms that overlapped its run". Genevieve Koski of The A.V. Club described it as a "steadfast, down-to-earth series" and contrasted it with other contemporary cartoons: "King of the Hill's characters aren't funny because they tell perfectly crafted jokes or make pop-culture references or constantly get themselves into ridiculous situations; they're funny because they have real hopes, flaws, and limitations that satirize the absurdity of everyday life while simultaneously celebrating it." She also noted that "the show saw its fair share of silly conceits and contrived setups—and got fairly repetitive in the final seasons".

Writers have examined the show through a political lens. "It's not a political show", said Mike Judge in 1997. "It's more a populist, common sense point of view." In 2005, Matt Bai of The New York Times Magazine called it "the most subtle and complex portrayal of small-town voters on television". A 2016 reappraisal from The Atlantic dubbed it the "last bipartisan TV comedy", with writer Bert Clere noting the program "imbued all of its characters with a rich humanity that made their foibles deeply sympathetic. In this, King of the Hill was far ahead of its time, and the broader TV landscape has yet to catch up."

In 2014, King of the Hill was ranked No. 27 on IGN's "Top 100 Animated TV Series". The publication also ranked it as No. 66 on their "The Top 100 Best TV Shows of All Time" list in 2023. In 2013, TV Guide ranked King of the Hill as one of the 60 Greatest TV Cartoons of All Time.

=== Ratings ===
Season		No. of episodes	Originally aired			Nielsen ratings	
Season		No. of episodes	Time slot (ET)	Season premiere	Season finale	Ranking	Viewers (in millions)
1st	1996–97	12	Sunday 8:30 pm	January 12, 1997	May 11, 1997	No. 43	8.6
2nd	1997–98	23	Sunday 8:30 pm	September 21, 1997	May 17, 1998	No. 15	16.3
3rd	1998–99	25	Tuesday 8:00 pm	September 15, 1998	May 18, 1999	No. 110	7.9
4th	1999–2000	24	Sunday 7:30 pm	September 26, 1999	May 21, 2000	No. 77	8.7
5th	2000–01	20	Sunday 7:30 pm	October 1, 2000	May 13, 2001	No. 68	9.5
6th	2001–02	22	Sunday 7:30 pm (Episodes 1-2, 4-15, 17-20, 22); Wednesday 8:00 pm (Episode 3); Sunday 8:30 pm (Episode 16); Sunday 7:00 pm (Episode 21)	November 11, 2001	May 12, 2002	No. 90	7.7
7th	2002–03	23	Sunday 8:30 pm (Episodes 1-3, 6-8, 10); Sunday 7:30 pm (Episodes 4-5, 9, 11-12, 14-21, 23); Sunday 7:00 pm (Episodes 13, 22)	November 3, 2002	May 18, 2003	No. 68	9.5
8th	2003–04	22	Sunday 7:30 pm (Episodes 1-9, 15-22); Sunday 7:00 pm (Episodes 10-14)	November 2, 2003	May 23, 2004	No. 118	6.4
9th	2004–05	15	Sunday 7:00 pm (Episode 1, 3-6, 8-15); Sunday 9:30 pm (Episodes 2, 7)	November 7, 2004	May 15, 2005	No. 110	4.8
10th	2005–06	15	Sunday 7:30 pm	September 18, 2005	May 14, 2006	No. 111	5.2
11th	2006–07	12	Sunday 8:30 pm (Episodes 1-5); Sunday 7:30 pm (Episodes 6, 8-10, 12); Sunday 7:00 pm (Episodes 7, 11)	January 28, 2007	May 20, 2007	No. 109	5.5
12th	2007–08	22	Sunday 8:30 pm (Episodes 1-6, 8-22); Sunday 7:00 pm (Episode 7)	September 23, 2007	May 18, 2008	No. 105	6.6
13th	2008–09	24	Sunday 8:30 pm (Episodes 1-13, 16-18, 20); Sunday 7:30 pm (Episodes 14-15); Sunday 8:00 pm (Episode 19)	September 28, 2008	September 13, 2009	No. 95	6.0

==== Streaming viewership ====
King of the Hill ranked No. 1 on Hulu's "Top 15 Today" list—a daily updated list of the platform's most-watched titles—upon its Season 14 premiere on August 4. The series subsequently remained among the top five titles on Hulu, as of August 13. Season 14 garnered 4.4 million views worldwide in its first seven days of streaming, becoming the most-viewed adult animation season premiere on Hulu and Disney+ in five years. Nielsen Media Research, which records streaming viewership on U.S. television screens, reported that King of the Hill recorded 1.208 billion minutes of watch time, ranking as the second most-streamed program overall from August 4–10. The following week, from August 11–17, it garnered 714 million minutes of watch time, ranking as the third most-streamed original series. From August 18–24, King of the Hill recorded 567 million minutes of watch time, placing fourth among original series for that week. Nielsen further reported that King of the Hill was streamed for 424 million minutes from August 25–31, making it the seventh most-streamed original series of the week. In December 2025, Disney announced that King of the Hill was among the television series to surpass one billion hours streamed on Disney+ in 2025.

The revival also renewed interest in earlier seasons, with streaming viewership for seasons 1 through 13 increasing by 41% and reaching a total of 26 million hours streamed between March and August 2025. The series has generated over $100 million in streaming revenue since 2020.

=== Awards and nominations ===
Year	Award	Category	Nominee(s)	Result
1997	Annie Awards	Best Animated TV Program	20th Century Fox and Film Roman	Nominated
1997	Annie Awards	Best Individual Achievement: Directing in a TV Production	John Rice (for "Keeping Up with Our Joneses")	Nominated
1997	Annie Awards	Best Individual Achievement: Voice Acting by a Female Performer in a TV Production	Brittany Murphy (as Luanne Platter)	Nominated
1997	Annie Awards	Best Individual Achievement: Voice Acting by a Male Performer in a TV Production	Mike Judge (as Hank Hill)	Nominated
1997	Annie Awards	Best Individual Achievement: Writing in a TV Production	Paul Lieberstein (for "Luanne's Saga")	Nominated
1997	Annie Awards	Best Individual Achievement: Writing in a TV Production	Alan R. Cohen and Alan Freedland (for "Shins of the Father")	Nominated
1997	Primetime Emmy Awards	Outstanding Animated Program (For Programming One Hour or Less)	Greg Daniels, Mike Judge, Howard Klein, Michael Rotenberg, et al. (for "Square Peg")	Nominated
1997	TCA Awards	Outstanding Achievement in Comedy	King of the Hill	Nominated
1998	Annie Awards	Outstanding Achievement in an Animated Primetime or Late Night Television Program	20th Century Fox Television, Deedle-Dee Productions, Judgemental Films, and 3 Arts Entertainment	Nominated
1998	Annie Awards	Outstanding Individual Achievement for Voice Acting by a Female Performer in an Animated Television Production	Kathy Najimy (as Peggy Hill)	Nominated
1998	BMI Film & TV Awards	BMI TV Music Award	John O'Connor, Roger Neill, and Lance Rubin	Won
1998	Kids' Choice Awards	Favorite Cartoon	King of the Hill	Nominated
1998	Golden Reel Award	Best Sound Editing – Television Animated Specials	"The Unbearable Blindness of Laying"	Nominated
1998	Golden Reel Award	Best Sound Editing – Television Animation – Music	King of the Hill	Nominated
1998	Primetime Emmy Awards	Outstanding Animated Program (For Programming One Hour or Less)	Greg Daniels, Mike Judge, Howard Klein, Michael Rotenberg, et al. (for "Texas City Twister")	Nominated
1999	Annie Awards	Outstanding Achievement in an Animated Television Program	20th Century Fox Television	Nominated
1999	Annie Awards	Outstanding Individual Achievement for Writing in an Animated Television Production	Jim Dauterive (for "Hank's Cowboy Movie")	Nominated
1999	Primetime Emmy Awards	Outstanding Animated Program (For Programming One Hour or Less)	Greg Daniels, Mike Judge, Howard Klein, Michael Rotenberg, Richard Appel, et al. (for "And They Call It Bobby Love")	Won
2000	Annie Awards	Outstanding Individual Achievement for Directing in an Animated Television Production	Kyoung Hee Lim and Boo Hwan Lim (for "Won't You Pimai Neighbor?")	Nominated
2000	Annie Awards	Outstanding Individual Achievement for Voice Acting by a Female Performer in an Animated Television Production	Brittany Murphy (as Luanne Platter in "Movin' on Up")	Nominated
2000	Annie Awards	Outstanding Individual Achievement for Voice Acting by a Male Performer in an Animated Television Production	Mike Judge (as Hank Hill in "Hanky Panky")	Nominated
2000	Annie Awards	Outstanding Individual Achievement for Writing in an Animated Television Production	Garland Testa (for "Aisle 8A")	Nominated
2001	American Comedy Awards	Funniest Television Series – Animated	King of the Hill	Nominated
2001	Annie Awards	Outstanding Individual Achievement for Voice Acting by a Female Performer in an Animated Television Production	Kathy Najimy (as Peggy Hill in "Luanne Virgin 2.0")	Won
2001	Annie Awards	Outstanding Individual Achievement for Writing in an Animated Television Production	Garland Testa (for "Chasing Bobby")	Nominated
2001	Primetime Emmy Awards	Outstanding Animated Program (For Programming Less Than One Hour)	Greg Daniels, Mike Judge, Richard Appel, Howard Klein, Michael Rotenberg, et al. (for "Chasing Bobby")	Nominated
2002	Annie Awards	Outstanding Writing in an Animated Television Production	Norm Hiscock (for "Bobby Goes Nuts")	Won
2002	Annie Awards	Outstanding Writing in an Animated Television Production	Kit Boss (for "A Man Without a Country Club")	Nominated
2002	Primetime Emmy Awards	Outstanding Voice-Over Performance	Pamela Adlon (as Bobby Hill, Clark Peters, and Chane Wassanasong in "Bobby Goes Nuts")	Won
2002	Primetime Emmy Awards	Outstanding Animated Program (For Programming Less Than One Hour)	Greg Daniels, Mike Judge, Richard Appel, Howard Klein, Michael Rotenberg, et al. (for "Bobby Goes Nuts")	Nominated
2003	Annie Awards	Outstanding Writing in an Animated Television Production	Tony Gama-Lobo and Rebecca May (for "Reborn to Be Wild")	Nominated
2003	GLAAD Media Awards	Outstanding Individual Episode (In a Series Without a Regular Gay Character)	"My Own Private Rodeo"	Nominated
2003	Writers Guild of America Awards	Animation	Alex Gregory and Peter Huyck (for "My Own Private Rodeo")	Nominated
2004	Annie Awards	Voice Acting in an Animated Television Production	Brittany Murphy (as Luanne Platter in "Girl, You'll Be a Giant Soon")	Won
2004	Annie Awards	Writing in an Animated Television Production	Etan Cohen (for "Ceci N'est Pas Une King of the Hill")	Won
2004	Writers Guild of America Awards	Animation	Tony Gama-Lobo and Rebecca May (for "Reborn to Be Wild")	Nominated
2005	Annie Awards	Best Voice Acting in an Animated Television Production	Johnny Hardwick (as Dale Gribble in "Smoking and the Bandit")	Nominated
2006	Annie Awards	Best Animated Television Production	20th Century Fox Television	Nominated
2006	Teen Choice Awards	TV – Choice Animated Show	King of the Hill	Nominated
2007	People's Choice Awards	Favorite TV Comedy – Animated	King of the Hill	Nominated
2007	Writers Guild of America Awards	Animation	Jim Dauterive (for "Church Hopping")	Nominated
2008	Annie Awards	Best Animated Television Production	20th Century Fox Television	Nominated
2008	People's Choice Awards	Favorite Animated TV Comedy	King of the Hill	Nominated
2008	Primetime Emmy Awards	Outstanding Animated Program (For Programming Less Than One Hour)	Mike Judge, Greg Daniels, John Altschuler, Dave Krinsky, Jim Dauterive, Garland Testa, et al. (for "Death Picks Cotton")	Nominated
2008	Writers Guild of America Awards	Animation	Jim Dauterive (for "Lucky's Wedding Suit")	Nominated
2008	Writers Guild of America Awards	Animation	Tony Gama-Lobo and Rebecca May (for "The Passion of the Dauterive")	Nominated
2009	Prism Awards	Comedy Episode	"Dia-BILL-ic Shock"	Won
2009	Writers Guild of America Awards	Animation	Jim Dauterive (for "Strangeness on a Train")	Nominated
2009	Writers Guild of America Awards	Animation	Dan McGrath (for "Life: A Loser's Manual")	Nominated
2026	Creative Arts Emmy Awards	Outstanding Character Voice-Over Performance	Pamela Adlon (as Bobby Hill for "Any Given Hill-Day")	Nominated

== Home media ==
The first six seasons were released on DVD by 20th Century Fox Home Entertainment from 2003 to 2006. The seventh season was originally planned to be released in late 2006, but most likely due to poor sales of the DVDs, the release was canceled. However, 8 years later in 2014, Olive Films acquired the sub-license to release future seasons of the show, and seasons seven and eight were released on November 18, of that same year, with nine and ten released on April 7, 2015, eleven released on August 25, 2015, twelve released on September 22, 2015, and thirteen released (also Blu-ray) on October 20, 2015.

Netflix and Fox streamed all episodes, but stopped streaming on October 1, 2013, and in early 2017, the series was removed from iTunes and Google Play, though it returned to the latter later that year. As of May 2018, all episodes were again removed from Google Play and iTunes.

On November 1, 2018, all episodes became available for streaming on Hulu in the US. In some countries, the series was unavailable to stream or buy digitally, since Hulu is only available in the United States. However in 2022, the series was made available internationally on Disney+ through the Star hub.

Title	Episodes	DVD release date			Blu-ray release date (Region A)
Title	Episodes	Region 1	Region 2	Region 4	Blu-ray release date (Region A)
The Complete First Season	13	July 1, 2003	March 13, 2006	March 15, 2006	TBA
The Complete Second Season	22	November 11, 2003	March 13, 2006	May 23, 2006	TBA
The Complete Third Season	25	December 28, 2004	August 28, 2006	September 26, 2006	TBA
The Complete Fourth Season	24	May 3, 2005	January 15, 2007	June 19, 2007	TBA
The Complete Fifth Season	20	November 22, 2005	February 26, 2007	April 23, 2008	TBA
The Complete Sixth Season	22	May 2, 2006	July 27, 2015	TBA	TBA
The Complete Seventh Season	23	November 18, 2014	July 27, 2015	TBA	TBA
The Complete Eighth Season	22	November 18, 2014	August 24, 2015	TBA	TBA
The Complete Ninth Season	15	April 7, 2015	August 24, 2015	TBA	TBA
The Complete Tenth Season	15	April 7, 2015	February 29, 2016	TBA	TBA
The Complete Eleventh Season	12	August 25, 2015	February 29, 2016	TBA	TBA
The Complete Twelfth Season	22	September 22, 2015	March 28, 2016	TBA	TBA
The Complete Thirteenth Season	24	October 20, 2015	April 4, 2016	TBA	October 20, 2015

The show aired in broadcast syndication from 2001 to 2019. From September 2004 to December 2008, FX aired the series daily nationwide. The show later aired on Cartoon Network's late-night programming block Adult Swim from January 1, 2009, to June 29, 2018. The series then aired short-lived reruns on Comedy Central and CMT from July 24, 2018, until November 2019, when the series was pulled from their lineups. However, the series joined FXX's lineup on September 20, 2021; shortly thereafter, Adult Swim regained partial syndication, so FXX and Adult Swim shared the syndication rights as of November 22, 2021 through November 22, 2025, as be back to be exclusive on FXX in the meantime.

== Video games ==
A video game based on the series was released on November 13, 2000, for the PC. The player goes on a hunting trip with Hank and the gang where the player must hunt for various animals. The game received mixed to negative reviews. The characters also appeared in a crossover game, Animation Throwdown: The Quest for Cards, which features not only King of the Hill, but also Family Guy, American Dad!, Futurama, Bob's Burgers, and Archer. They are also playable characters in a 2022 racing game, Warped Kart Racers, also featuring Family Guy and American Dad!, as well as Solar Opposites. Hank Hill also appears as an skin in Fortnite.

== Archival sources ==
- The King of the Hill Production Archive 1995–2006 (75 linear ft) is housed at the Wittliff Collections, Texas State University in San Marcos. (Scroll down for link to PDF.)
