= List of King of the Hill home video releases =

King of the Hill season box sets have been released on DVD since 2003 in Region 1, Region 2 and Region 4. Seasons one to thirteen have been released in both Region 1 and Region 2, though only seasons one to five were released in Region 4. The first six seasons were issued by 20th Century Fox Home Entertainment; releases of season seven and onward were by Olive Films, who acquired the rights in 2014.

== Release summary ==
DVDs	Episodes	Discs	Release dates		
DVDs	Episodes	Discs	Region 1	Region 2	Region 4
Season One	13	3	July 1, 2003	March 13, 2006	March 15, 2006
Season Two	22	4	November 11, 2003	March 13, 2006	May 23, 2006
Season Three	25	3	December 28, 2004	August 28, 2006	September 26, 2006
Season Four	24	3	May 3, 2005	January 15, 2007	June 19, 2007
Season Five	20	3	November 22, 2005	February 26, 2007	April 23, 2008
Season Six	22	3	May 2, 2006	July 27, 2015	N/A
Season Seven	23	3	November 18, 2014	July 27, 2015	N/A
Season Eight	22	3	November 18, 2014	August 24, 2015	N/A
Season Nine	15	2	April 7, 2015	August 24, 2015	N/A
Season Ten	15	2	April 7, 2015	February 29, 2016	N/A
Season Eleven	12	2	August 25, 2015	February 29, 2016	N/A
Season Twelve	22	3	September 22, 2015	March 28, 2016	N/A
Season Thirteen	24	3	October 20, 2015	April 4, 2016	N/A

== Region 1 ==
Below is a list of Region 1 box sets featuring complete seasons of the show. Currently, no single disc-compilation DVDs have been released as they have with The Simpsons, Futurama, Family Guy, and American Dad!.

=== The Complete First Season ===
This is the first King of the Hill box set, released on July 1, 2003. It contains all thirteen episodes produced (only 12 were aired in season 1, one episode was held over for broadcast with season 2) from the first season (1997) spread across three DVD-9s (single-sided, dual layer).

The set features Dolby Digital 2.0 audio in English and Spanish, and is presented in full-frame, with optional closed captions and subtitles in English and Spanish.

This set is the only one to present the episodes in production order; seasons 2 and onward were issued in airdate order.

==== Bonus features ====
- Crew commentaries:
  - Pilot - featuring Greg Daniels, co-creator
  - The Order of the Straight Arrow - featuring Klay Hall, director
  - Hank's Unmentionable Problem - featuring Greg Daniels, co-creator
  - The Company Man - featuring Klay Hall, director
- In-character commentaries:
  - Westie Side Story - Dale Gribble and Bill Dauterive (Johnny Hardwick and Stephen Root)
  - Shins of the Father - Peggy Hill and Bobby Hill (Kathy Najimy and Pamela Segall)
  - Plastic White Female - Peggy Hill and Bobby Hill (Kathy Najimy and Pamela Segall)
  - King of the Ant Hill - Dale Gribble and Bill Dauterive (Johnny Hardwick and Stephen Root)
- Disc introductions by Hank, Bobby and Dale
- Making-of featurette (23 minutes)
- Meet the Hills interactive gallery
- "The Do's and Don'ts" animation guide (still frames)
- Promotional spots
- Barenaked Ladies "Get in Line" music video
- Deleted scenes and animatic footage on most episodes

=== The Complete Second Season ===
This is the second King of the Hill box set, released on November 11, 2003. It contains all twenty-two episodes from the second season (1997-1998) spread across four DVD-9s (single-sided, dual layer).

From this set onward, episodes were featured in airdate order.

==== Bonus features ====
- Crew commentaries:
  - How to Fire a Rifle Without Really Trying - featuring Greg Daniels, co-creator and Paul Lieberstein, writer
- In-character commentaries:
  - Husky Bobby - Peggy Hill, Bobby Hill and Luanne Platter (Kathy Najimy, Pamela Segall and Brittany Murphy)
  - The Man Who Shot Cane Skretteburg - Dale Gribble, Bill Dauterive and Cotton Hill (Johnny Hardwick, Stephen Root and Toby Huss)
  - Three Days of the Kahndo - Dale Gribble, Bill Dauterive and Kahn Souphanousinphone (Johnny Hardwick, Stephen Root and Toby Huss)
  - Leanne's Saga - Peggy Hill, Bobby Hill and Luanne Platter (Kathy Najimy, Pamela Segall and Brittany Murphy)
- Short animated director intros for 19 episodes
- 'Animation Evolution' featurette
- 'The Arlen School of Drawing' tutorial
- 'That Boy Ain't Right' book excerpts (still frames)
- 'Music Inspired by the Hills'
- 197 deleted scenes and pieces of animatic footage, covering every episode

=== The Complete Third Season ===
This is the third King of the Hill box set, released on December 28, 2004. It contains all twenty-five episodes from the third season (1998-1999) spread across three DVD-10s (double-sided, single layer).

After a four-month gap between seasons 1 and 2, this set was not released until 13 months after season two's release, in December 2004, after being initially scheduled for spring of that year; this delay was attributed to issues involving music licensing especially with the episodes "Love Hurts...And So Does Art" and "Wings of the Dope," each of which used two popular songs. This and the next three seasons are on dual sided DVDs (Three discs per set instead of the previous six). Special features were also dropped, perhaps due to a waning interest in DVD seasons in the series.

=== The Complete Fourth Season ===
This is the fourth King of the Hill box set, released on May 3, 2005. It contains all twenty-four episodes from the fourth season (1999 - 2000) spread across three DVD-10s (double-sided, single layer).

=== The Complete Fifth Season ===
This is the fifth King of the Hill box set, released on November 22, 2005. It contains all twenty episodes from the fifth season (2000-2001) spread across two double-sided and one single-sided DVD.

=== The Complete Sixth Season ===
This is the sixth King of the Hill box set, released on May 2, 2006. It contains all twenty-two episodes from the sixth season (2001-2002) spread across three DVD-10s (double-sided, single layer).

=== The Complete Seventh Season and The Complete Eighth Season ===
For unknown reasons, 20th Century Fox Home Entertainment did not release additional seasons of King of the Hill on DVD. However, in September 2014, it was announced that Olive Films had acquired the rights to release the show on DVD, and would be issuing seasons seven and eight separately on November 18, 2014, with both sets having three discs each.

=== The Complete Ninth Season and The Complete Tenth Season ===
Olive Films followed their release of the two prior seasons with the ninth and tenth seasons, which were released on April 7, 2015, with two 2-disc sets.

=== The Complete Eleventh Season ===
The 11th season was released on August 25, 2015.

=== The Complete Twelfth Season ===
The 12th season was released on September 22, 2015.

=== The Complete Thirteenth Season ===
The 13th season was released on October 20, 2015; aside from having a DVD release, it was also released on Blu-ray (Season 13 was the first season presented in HDTV 720p).

== Region 2 ==
=== The Complete First Season ===
This is the first King of the Hill box set, released on March 13, 2006. It contains all thirteen episodes from the first season (1997) spread across three DVD-9s (single-sided, dual layer).

The set features Dolby Digital 2.0 audio in English, and is presented in full-frame, with optional subtitles in English. Additional languages are, as yet, to be confirmed.

This set is the only one to present the episodes in production order; seasons 2 and onward are issued in airdate order.

==== Bonus features ====
- Crew commentaries:
  - Pilot - featuring Greg Daniels, co-creator
  - The Order of the Straight Arrow - featuring Klay Hall, director
  - Hank's Unmentionable Problem - featuring Greg Daniels, co-creator
  - The Company Man - featuring Klay Hall, director
- In-character commentaries:
  - Westie Side Story - Dale Gribble and Bill Dauterive (Johnny Hardwick and Stephen Root)
  - Shins of the Father - Peggy Hill and Bobby Hill (Kathy Najimy and Pamela Segall)
  - Plastic White Female - Peggy Hill and Bobby Hill (Kathy Najimy and Pamela Segall)
  - King of the Ant Hill - Dale Gribble and Bill Dauterive (Johnny Hardwick and Stephen Root)
- Disc introductions by Hank, Bobby and Dale
- Making-of featurette (23 minutes)
- Meet the Hills interactive gallery
- "The Do's and Don'ts" animation guide (still frames)
- Promotional spots
- Barenaked Ladies "Get in Line" music video
- Deleted scenes and animatic footage on most episodes

=== The Complete Second Season ===
This is the second King of the Hill box set, released alongside season 1 on March 13, 2006. It contains all twenty-two episodes from the second season (1997-1998) spread across four DVD-9s (single-sided, dual layer).

The set features Dolby Digital 2.0 audio in English and is presented in full-frame, with optional closed captions and subtitles in English. Additional languages are, as yet, to be confirmed.

From this set onward, episodes were featured in airdate order.

==== Bonus features ====
- Crew commentaries:
  - How to Fire a Rifle Without Really Trying - featuring Greg Daniels, co-creator and Paul Lieberstein, writer
- In-character commentaries:
  - Husky Bobby - Peggy Hill, Bobby Hill and Luanne Platter (Kathy Najimy, Pamela Segall and Brittany Murphy)
  - The Man Who Shot Cane Skretteburg - Dale Gribble, Bill Dauterive and Cotton Hill (Johnny Hardwick, Stephen Root and Toby Huss)
  - Three Days of the Kahndo - Dale Gribble, Bill Dauterive and Kahn Souphanousinphone (Johnny Hardwick, Stephen Root and Toby Huss)
  - Leanne's Saga - Peggy Hill, Bobby Hill and Luanne Platter (Kathy Najimy, Pamela Segall and Brittany Murphy)
- Short animated director intros for 19 episodes
- 'Animation Evolution' featurette
- 'The Arlen School of Drawing' tutorial
- 'That Boy Ain't Right' book excerpts (still frames)
- 'Music Inspired by the Hills'
- 197 deleted scenes and pieces of animatic footage, covering every episode

=== The Complete Third Season ===
This is the third King of the Hill box set, which was released on August 28, 2006. It contains all twenty-five episodes from the third season (1998-1999) spread across four dual layer DVDs. The Australian release is also spread across four discs.

=== The Complete Fourth Season ===
This is the fourth King of the Hill box set, which was released on January 15, 2007. It contains all twenty-four episodes from the fourth season (1999-2000) spread across four DVD-9s (single-sided, dual layer).

=== The Complete Fifth Season ===
This is the fifth King of the Hill box set, which was released on February 26, 2007. It contains all twenty episodes from the fifth season (2000-2001) spread across four DVD-9s.
