= King of the Hill season 14 =

King of the Hill
- Season 14
- Promotional poster
- Showrunner: Saladin Patterson
- Starring: Mike Judge; Kathy Najimy; Pamela Adlon; Johnny Hardwick; Stephen Root; Lauren Tom; Toby Huss
- No. of episodes: 10

Release
- Original network: Hulu
- Original release: August 4, 2025

Season chronology
- ← Previous; Season 13 Next → Season 15

The fourteenth season of King of the Hill was released on Hulu on August 4, 2025. It marks the first season to premiere on the service, replacing the previous broadcaster, the Fox Broadcasting Company (often simply referred to as the "Fox" network). It is the first in the series to be co-produced by co-creators Mike Judge and Greg Daniels' company, Bandera Entertainment, and the final production to feature the involvement of Johnny Hardwick who provided the voice of Dale Gribble.

Many other notable cast members from previous seasons did not return due to various circumstances; these included actress Brittany Murphy, who voiced Luanne Platter, and musician Tom Petty, who voiced Lucky Kleinschmidt, following their respective deaths in 2009 and 2017.

The season was the first new season of the series since the conclusion of its original run in 2009. It is also the first season animated by 20th Television Animation, as Film Roman shut down in 2018. It received acclaim from critics, praising it for successfully recapturing the show's spirit while aging the characters in the modern setting.

== Premise ==
The fourteenth season is set eight years after the conclusion of the original series. It depicts an older Hank Hill and his wife Peggy returning to their home of Arlen, Texas after spending time in Saudi Arabia. Now retired from working at Strickland Propane, Hank realizes that Arlen has changed while he was gone. His son Bobby, now works as a chef at a Robata in Dallas.

== Production ==
=== Background ===
Following the season thirteen episode "To Sirloin with Love", the original intended series finale, and the last four episodes that aired in syndication, the Fox Broadcasting Company publicly announced its decision to not renew Mike Judge's series King of the Hill for a fourteenth season. It was announced that Seth MacFarlane, creator of two of Fox's other popular animated shows—Family Guy and American Dad!—had created a new series for the network, titled The Cleveland Show, which had served as a spin-off to his former series, and would takeover King of the Hill's timeslot on the Animation Domination schedule. Some sources later suggested that ABC (who were recently airing Mike Judge's other program, The Goode Family) saw the potential into acquiring syndication for the series, however in January 2009 the network's then-president, Steve McPherson, later denied this by saying that they had "no plans to pick up the animated comedy." At the Beavis and Butt-Head panel at San Diego Comic-Con in 2011, Judge said that there were no plans to revive the series at the time, but didn't rule out a possibility for them to do so in the future.

In August 2017, then-Chairman and CEO of Fox Television Group, Dana Walden confirmed that the network entered "preliminary conversations" with Mike Judge and Greg Daniels to bring the show back. In a March 2018 interview with Rotten Tomatoes, Judge suggested that if a revival for King of the Hill were to be made, he would like for the characters to be aged-up. On March 20, 2019, The Walt Disney Company acquired ownership of the series following their acquisition of 21st Century Fox. Later that same year, the Fox network debuted Bless the Harts, with its creator, Emily Spivey, and co-executive producer, Christy Stratton, previously serving as story writers on King of the Hill. While Mike Judge himself was not involved in its development, he granted permission for Spivey to incorporate the Mega Lo Mart from his show, thus making Bless the Harts a series set loosely within the same universe.

On March 25, 2020, Daniels reiterated that he and Judge were sharing ideas for a potential revival with each other, hoping that their plans would move forward in the future. The following year, series writer Brent Forrester stated that co-creators Mike Judge and Greg Daniels were in "hot negotiations" to bring the show back, while the "Trump administration made it suddenly very relevant again" and concluding that the "characters have all aged 15 years." This was later lowered to 8 years, albeit applied arbitrarily, as in the case of Good Hank. In January 2022, it was announced that Judge and Daniels co-founded a new animation company known as Bandera Entertainment, and while no official details were revealed, it also was revealed that a revival for King of the Hill was slated to be in-development. Seven months later during a panel at San-Diego Comic Con, Judge provided an update on the revival, mentioning that the show "has a very good chance of coming back." In September, Fox Entertainment president Michael Thorn confirmed that Fox would not be airing the fourteenth season, citing the network's preference to air the company's own programming beside its existing legacy shows.

=== Development ===
A revival was officially announced to have been commissioned by Hulu on January 31, 2023, whose service provided exclusive syndication to the show's upcoming fourteenth season, as the platform also holds the streaming rights to the first thirteen seasons in the United States. Saladin Patterson joined the newest season as an executive producer and showrunner, alongside executive producers Michael Rotenberg and Howard Klein of 3 Arts Entertainment, and Dustin Davis of Bandera Entertainment, with co-production by 20th Television Animation, 3 Arts Entertainment and Bandera Entertainment.

According to voice actor Stephen Root, the cast began conducting table readings in April 2023. He also reiterated that the story line for season 14 will feature a "time jump" with an older Bobby, as previously reported.

In a November 2023 interview, co-creator Greg Daniels confirmed that the series had been affected by the Writers Guild of America (WGA) strike that occurred earlier that same year, with the show's writing staff halting work until the end of the strike. As a result of the added delays, the season was pushed back to a possible release date of "the beginning of 2025".

During the Hulu Animayhem panel at D23: The Ultimate Disney Fan Event on August 10, 2024, Mike Judge briefly spoke about the upcoming season, by saying that the feeling was "great" when it came to reuniting with the original cast, despite being a little older, and that he "won't get too into how we're doing it".

=== Casting ===
The following cast members were confirmed to be reprising their roles: Judge as Hank Hill and Jeff Boomhauer, Kathy Najimy as Peggy Hill, Root as Bill Dauterive, Pamela Adlon as Bobby Hill, Johnny Hardwick as Dale Gribble and Lauren Tom as both Connie & Minh Souphanousinphone, respectively.

Judge, Daniels, and Patterson debated whether to recast Adlon to voice a now-adult Bobby. Patterson and Daniels ultimately decided to keep her, concluding that fans would prefer to hear Adlon sound like she always had as Bobby, without pitching or changing her performance. Adlon did research on adults whose voices have never changed to make sure her character didn't sound younger or like a middle-aged lady. Paterson said about the decision, "Greg and I had a conversation about what the fans are gonna really wanna see when they revisit this. We personally like hearing Pam just do Bobby, you know, not trying to change it, not trying to pitch it up, whatever, you know, we, we feel that that's going to be most comfortable for people to hear that voice they recognize and it's Pam. I mean it's magical, right? So you know why, why tweak the magic?"

On August 8, 2023, Hardwick died at the age of 64. Despite originally being scheduled to return for the entirety of the season, TVLine reported that he was only able to finish recording his lines for a couple of episodes before recording sessions were properly concluded by cast members, with IGN reaching out to "a source close to the production", who was able to verify the claim. In May 2025, it was revealed that Hardwick recorded six episodes as Dale for the revival with Toby Huss taking over afterwards, having previously voiced several characters in the original thirteen seasons, including recurring characters Cotton Hill and Kahn Souphanousinphone. Huss revealed that he was cast as Dale during a read-through as the character during production.

Greg Daniels would later mention during his November 2023 interview that he was not sure whether or not Kahn would return, but clarified that the role would be recast if so, and by noting that the casting of Huss was because they "didn't have the budget to hire a special performer for each voice". Ronny Chieng was then later revealed to be the new voice for Kahn in July 2025 after revealing the news in December 2024 on Ari Shaffir's You Be Trippin' podcast.

Before his death in June 2025, Jonathan Joss returned for the revival as the voice of John Redcorn and had begun recording. On June 1, just hours before his death, Joss uploaded an Instagram video of himself walking around Austin and noting how he already recorded lines for four episodes. Two weeks before the revival's premiere, IndieWire revealed more additional roles consisting of Keith David as Brian Robertson, the tenant who rents the Hill's house during their relocation and Anthony 'Critic' Campos as Emilio, a chef who works with Bobby at the Robata Chane in Dallas. Tai Leclaire replaces Breckin Meyer as Joseph Gribble while Kenneth Choi, alongside Ki Hong Lee voices Ted and Chane Wassanasong from both Huss and Adlon.

== Release ==
Unlike previous seasons, which originally aired on Fox, or through network syndication (in the case of the thirteenth season, where its last four episodes aired in syndication only), the fourteenth season instead premiered on Hulu on August 4, 2025. It was also made available to stream on Disney+ via the Hulu hub in the United States, and as a Star Original internationally. The service had also given the series an early renewal for an additional fifteenth season ahead of its intended release.

== Episodes ==
No. overall	No. in season	Title	Directed by	Written by	Original release date	Prod. code
260	1	"Return of the King"	Kelly Turnbull	Mike Judge & Greg Daniels & Saladin K. Patterson	August 4, 2025	EABE01
Eight years after the events of the original show, Hank and Peggy have spent some time working for Aramco in Saudi Arabia and have since returned to Arlen, only to find that it is very much different. Bobby, now living in Dallas as a head chef at a Japanese-German-American fusion restaurant he co-owns with Chane Wassanasong, hooks up with a college girl and runs into Connie Souphanousinphone.
261	2	"The Beer Story"	Mollie Helms	Norm Hiscock	August 4, 2025	EABE02
Hank and Bobby compete in a beer competition in Dallas when they have a spat about which of their preferences for beer (for Hank, traditionally made and for Bobby, added flavor) is better. Note: This is the first episode of the series to feature Tai LaClaire and Ki Hong Lee as the voices of Joseph Gribble and Chane Wassanasong, respectively.
262	3	"Bobby Gets Grilled"	Allan Jacobsen	Norm Hiscock & Anthony Del Broccolo	August 4, 2025	EABE07
Bobby is harassed by a bunch of people when they think his restaurant represents cultural appropriation while Hank, Peggy and the Gribbles join a museum tour of the George W. Bush Presidential Center, but Dale's constant spouting conspiracy theories become more popular. Note: This is the first episode of the series to feature Toby Huss and Kenneth Choi as the voices of Dale Gribble and Ted Wassanasong, respectively.
263	4	"Chore Money, Chore Problems"	Kyounghee Lim	Sam Fishell	August 4, 2025	EABE03
Wanting to feel useful after retirement, Hank joins Boomhauer in his door-to-door handyman business. After Boomhauer suffers from an injury and Hank takes over, he soon discovers that Boomhauer's customers tend to get personal with the handyman. Bobby discovers that Chane and Connie are dating; Connie sets Bobby up with one of her friends at a dance club.
264	5	"New Ref in Town"	Michael Baylis	Anthony Del Broccolo	August 4, 2025	EABE04
Hank becomes a soccer referee after gaining appreciation for the sport from living in Saudi Arabia, but is too embarrassed to tell his soccer-averse friends. Things get complicated when Dale and Bill catch on. Bobby tries to buy a car and manages to outwit a typical shady salesman, but the owner of the dealership manages to use Bobby's kindness in order to buy an aging horse that's due to be killed.
265	6	"Peggy's Fadeout"	Kelly Turnbull	Jeremy Hsu	August 4, 2025	EABE05
Hank finds out that Bill lied to a group of Black barbers he used to work with that he is married to Peggy. When Peggy tells Bill to tell them the truth, Bill instead holds a fake funeral for Peggy. Bobby learns that Connie and Chane have an open relationship, and a flummoxed Bobby hooks up with a vegan activist named Willow.
266	7	"Any Given Hill-Day"	Mollie Helms & Annie Li	Erica Rosbe	August 4, 2025	EABE06
Willow joins Hank and Bobby at a fantasy football camp for the Dallas Cowboys, but Hank and Willow end up bonding, making Bobby feel like a third wheel. Bobby and Hank soon discover that Willow has an ulterior motive for joining them. Peggy believes that her neighbors are too locked in their devices and installs a lending library to bring the community closer together, only to realize later that the books she supplied contained bed bugs. Note: This is the last episode of the series to feature Johnny Hardwick as the voice of Dale Gribble. This episode was dedicated in memory of him.
267	8	"Kahn-scious Uncoupling"	Kyounghee Lim	Jeremy Hsu	August 4, 2025	EABE09
Hank finds out that Minh divorced Kahn some time ago. Kahn swears him to secrecy for the sake of their fake 30th anniversary party, but Hank lets Peggy in on the secret. Bobby is hired to be the party's head chef and learns of the divorce, and his concern for Connie (and Dale misplacing a secret camera) soon leads to everyone at the party learning the truth. Note: This is the first episode of the series to feature Ronny Chieng as the voice of Kahn Souphanisophone.
268	9	"No Hank Left Behind"	Samantha Arnett	Stephanie M. Johnson	August 4, 2025	EABE08
Hank takes his teenage half-brother "Good Hank" to a male-only retreat only to find out the group encourages misogynistic beliefs. Hank is horrified to see G.H. acting like their late father Cotton and vows to put an end to it. Peggy sprains her leg but keeps suffering from panic attacks when getting an MRI. Bobby is forced to let her stay at his apartment, where she distracts him from making preparations for his restaurant.
269	10	"A Sounder Investment"	Michael Baylis	Marcelina Chavira	August 4, 2025	EABE10
Hank is reluctant to invest in Boomhauer's new wild hog killing business, but begins to have second thoughts after accidentally getting his old boss Buck Strickland involved. Bobby and Connie start dating, but between trying to act their age and recapturing old memories from when they were kids, it's seemingly a work in progress. Note: This episode was dedicated in memory of Jonathan Joss, the voice of John Redcorn. Joss died two months before the release of season 14.

== Reception ==
=== Viewership ===
King of the Hill ranked No. 1 on Hulu's "Top 15 Today" list—a daily updated list of the platform's most-watched titles—upon its Season 14 premiere on August 4. The series subsequently remained among the top five titles on Hulu, as of August 13. Season 14 garnered 4.4 million views worldwide in its first seven days of streaming, becoming the most-viewed adult animation season premiere on Hulu and Disney+ in five years. Nielsen Media Research, which records streaming viewership on U.S. television screens, reported that King of the Hill recorded 1.208 billion minutes of watch time, ranking as the second most-streamed program overall from August 4–10. The following week, from August 11–17, it garnered 714 million minutes of watch time, ranking as the third most-streamed original series. From August 18–24, King of the Hill recorded 567 million minutes of watch time, placing fourth among original series for that week. Nielsen further reported that King of the Hill was streamed for 424 million minutes from August 25–31, making it the seventh most-streamed original series of the week. In December 2025, Disney announced that King of the Hill was among the television series to surpass one billion hours streamed on Disney+ in 2025.

=== Critical response ===
The season holds a 98% approval rating on Rotten Tomatoes based on 52 critics' reviews. The website's consensus reads: "Dang it Bobby! King of the Hill is back and still as flavorful as barbecue grilled with propane in a revival season that deftly brings these characters into the modern era."
