= Pamela Adlon filmography =

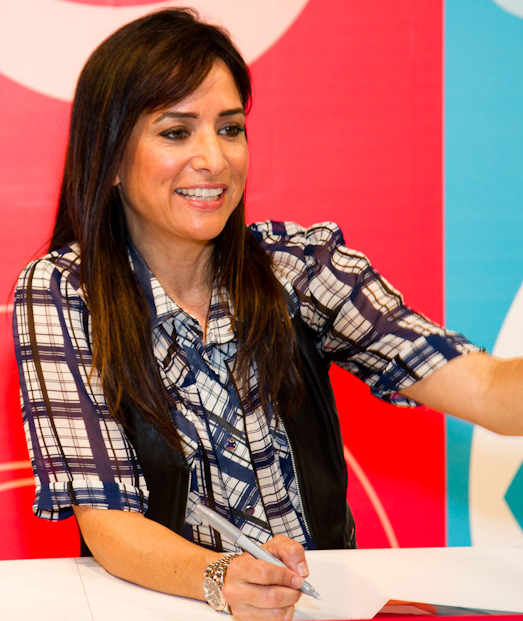
Pamela Adlon at San Diego Comic-Con in 2011

Pamela Adlon has starred in many feature films, television shows, and video games. She is known for her performances in Lucky Louie (2006), Louie (2010–2015), and Better Things (2016–2022). She also has had major performances in The Facts of Life (1983–1984), Californication (2007–2014), and guest appearances in The Jeffersons (1984), Boston Legal (2007–2008), Parenthood (2012), and This Is Us (2020). She is also a well known voice artist. Her voice credits include the animated programs Bobby's World (1992–1998), Rugrats (1992–2004), Recess (1997–2001), King of the Hill (1997–2010, 2025–present), Phineas and Ferb (2010–2013), Bob's Burgers (2012–2020), and Milo Murphy's Law (2016–2019).

== Live-action filmography ==
=== Film ===
List of acting performances in feature films
Year	Title	Role	Notes
1982	Grease 2	Dolores Rebchuck	
1984	Bad Manners	Girl Joey	
1986	SpaceCamp	Girl in Launch Control Gallery	Uncredited
1986	Willy/Milly	Willy / Milly Niceman	
1989	Say Anything...	Rebecca	
1989	After Midnight	Cheryl	Segment: "Allison's Story"
1990	The Gate II: Trespassers	Liz	
1990	The Adventures of Ford Fairlane	Pussycat	
1996	Bed of Roses	Kim	
1996	Sgt. Bilko	Sgt. Raquel Barbella	
1996	Father Frost	Marphuska	
1996	Two Guys Talkin' About Girls	Tracy	Direct-to-video
1997	Plump Fiction	Vallory Cox	
1997	Eat Your Heart Out	Samantha	Directed by Felix Adlon
1998	Some Girl	Jenn	
1998	Waiting for Woody	Lyza	Short film
2000	Dirk and Betty	Daisy	
2000	Net Worth	Unknown	
2005	Lucky 13	Brenda	
2011	Conception	Tay	
2013	9 Full Moons	Rachel Stevens	
2013	I Know That Voice	Herself	Documentary
2014	Truckin'	Perri Pinkston	Short film
2016	First Girl I Loved	Sharon	
2017	I Love You, Daddy	Maggie	
2018	All Square	Debbie	
2018	Bumblebee	Sally Watson	
2020	The King of Staten Island	Gina	
2020	Holler	Rhonda	
2024	Babes	N/A	Director

=== Television ===
List of acting performances in television shows
Year	Title	Role	Notes
1982	Little Darlings	Angel Bright	Television film
1983–1984	The Facts of Life	Kelly Affinado	12 episodes
1984	The Fantastic World of D.C. Collins	Tatyana	Television film
1984	Night Court	Andy / Stella	Episode: "Bull Gets a Kid"
1984	The Jeffersons	Stevie	Episode: "Try a Little Tenderness"
1984–1985	E/R	Jenny Sheinfeld	3 episodes
1986	The Redd Foxx Show	Toni Rutledge	7 episodes
1986	Pleasures	Claudia	Television film
1986	Disneyland	Jesse	Episode: "The Leftovers"
1988	The Bronx Zoo	Lisa	Episode: "Ties That Bind"
1988	ABC Afterschool Special	Jill	Episode: "A Family Again"
1989	Wiseguy	Tanya Medley	3 episodes
1989	Star Trek: The Next Generation	Oji	Episode: "Who Watches the Watchers"
1989	21 Jump Street	Dori the Psychic	Episode: "Old Haunts in the New Age"
1991	Life Goes On	Ruth Beale	Episode: "Armageddon"
1992	Down the Shore	Miranda Halpern	13 episodes
1992	The Heights	Rosie	Episode: "Splendor in the Past"
1996	Murder One	Amy Scott	Episode: "Chapter Fourteen"
1996	Relativity	Marcy Sedaris	2 episodes
1997	Breast Men	Margaret	Television film
2003	Six Feet Under	Nathaniel / Isabel / Evil Nurse	Episode: "Everyone Leaves"
2003	The Making of King of the Hill	Herself	Television documentary
2005	Unscripted	Pam	4 episodes
2006	Lucky Louie	Kim	13 episodes; also writer
2007	The Wedding Bells	DeDe Stoller	2 episodes
2007–2008	Boston Legal	Attorney Emma Path	4 episodes
2007–2014	Californication	Marcy Runkle	80 episodes
2009	Monk	Sarah Longson	Episode: "Mr. Monk On Wheels"
2009	Ace in the Hole	Susanna Morella	Unsold pilot
2010	True Jackson, VP	Babs	Episode: "Little Buddies"
2010–2015	Louie	Pamela	14 episodes; also writer and producer
2011	Love Bites	Colleen Rouscher	2 episodes
2012	Parenthood	Marleise Deigan	2 episodes
2014	Rake	Glenn Shepard	2 episodes
2015	Playing House	Pam	Episode: "Celebrate Me Scones"
2016–2022	Better Things	Sam Fox	44 episodes; also creator, writer, director, executive producer
2019	Young Sheldon	Mrs. Wolowitz	Episode: "A Swedish Science Thing and the Equation for Toast"
2020	This Is Us	Dr. Leigh	4 episodes
2023	History of the World, Part II	Fanny Mudman	3 episodes
2024	Elsbeth	Chef Genevieve "Veev" Hale	Episode: "Elsbeth Flips the Bird"; also director
2025	Mid-Century Modern	Mindy Schneiderman	3 episodes
2025	Shifting Gears	Molly	2 episodes

== Voice-over filmography ==
=== Film ===
List of voice performances in feature and direct-to-video films
Year	Title	Role	Notes
1992	FernGully: The Last Rainforest	Fairy #2	
1997	Princess Mononoke	Additional voices	English dub
1998	Kiki's Delivery Service	Ket	English Disney dub
1999	O' Christmas Tree	Baby Bear	Direct-to-video
2000	Vampire Hunter D: Bloodlust	Leila	
2000	Gen^{13}	Sarah Rainmaker	Direct-to-video
2001	Recess: School's Out	Ashley Spinelli	
2001	The Trumpet of the Swan	A.G. Skinner	
2001	Recess Christmas: Miracle on Third Street	Ashley Spinelli	Direct-to-video
2003	The Animatrix	Jue / Manabu	
2003	Brother Bear	Geese in flight formation	
2003	Recess: All Growed Down	Ashley Spinelli	Direct-to-video
2003	Recess: Taking the Fifth Grade	Ashley Spinelli	Direct-to-video
2004	Teacher's Pet	Trevor / Taylor / Tyler	
2008	Tinker Bell	Vidia	
2009	Tinker Bell and the Lost Treasure	Vidia	Uncredited
2010	A Turtle's Tale: Sammy's Adventures	Female Turtle #1	
2010	Tinker Bell and the Great Fairy Rescue	Vidia	
2012	Secret of the Wings	Vidia	
2012	Dino Time	Ernie Fitzpatrick	English dub
2014	The Pirate Fairy	Vidia	
2014	Tinker Bell and the Legend of the NeverBeast	Vidia	
2017	Best Fiends: Boot Camp	Hank	Short film
2017	Best Fiends: Visit Minutia	Hank	Short film
2018	Best Fiends: Fort of Hard Knocks	Bandit Slug	Short film
2019	Best Fiends: The Immortal Cockroach	Hank	Short film
2019	Trouble	Rousey	
2023	Leo	Sandy	
2026	Tangles	Debbie	

=== Television ===
List of voice performances in television shows
Year	Title	Role	Notes
1992	Darkwing Duck	Heatwave	Episode: "The Frequency Fiends"
1992–1998	Bobby's World	Derek Generic (season 7)	13 episodes
1992–2004	Rugrats	Dean, young Drew Pickles, additional voices	7 episodes
1993	The Addams Family	Mortimer	Episode: "Sweetheart of a Brother"
1993–1994	Problem Child	Additional voices	26 episodes
1994	Edith Ann: A Few Pieces of the Puzzle	Irene	Television special
1994	Edith Ann: Homeless Go Home	Irene	Television special
1994	Duckman	Unknown voice	Episode: "Ride the High School"
1994–1996	Phantom 2040	Sparks	26 episodes
1995	Capitol Critters	Violet	Episode: "If Lovin' You Is Wrong, I Don't Wanna Be Rat"
1996–1997	Jumanji	Rock	5 episodes
1996–1998	Jungle Cubs	Baloo	21 episodes
1996–1998	Adventures from the Book of Virtues	Zach Nichols / Boy	26 episodes
1996	Quack Pack	Dewey Duck	39 episodes
1996	Edith Ann's Christmas (Just Say Noël)	Irene / Tomas	Television special
1997	The New Batman Adventures	Mother	Episode: "Never Fear"
1997	The Blues Brothers Animated Series	Bobby G.	8 episodes
1997–1998	Bobby's World	Derek Generic (season 7)	10 episodes
1997–1998	101 Dalmatians: The Series	Lucky	41 episodes
1997–2001	Pepper Ann	Moose Pearson / Shouty Kid / Hush / Additional voices	47 episodes; (57 segments)
1997–2001	Recess	Ashley Spinelli	65 episodes (127 segments)
1997–2010, 2025–present	King of the Hill	Bobby Hill / Clark Peters / Chane Wassanasong (2000-2007) / Donna / Additional voices	Main role
1998	Cow and Chicken	Cousin Sow	3 episodes
1998	Hercules	Brutus	Episode: "Hercules and the Kids"
1998	Oh Yeah! Cartoons	Otto	Episode: "Kameleon Kid"
1998–2003	The Wacky Adventures of Ronald McDonald	McNugget #1	6 episodes
1999	The New Woody Woodpecker Show	Lester the Termite	3 episodes
1999	Todd McFarlane's Spawn	Judy	2 episodes
1999	Godzilla: The Series	Animal's Son, Female Soldier	Episode: "Future Shock"
1999	Pinky, Elmyra & the Brain	Andrew Loam	Episode: "Wag the Mouse"
1999–2001	Big Guy and Rusty the Boy Robot	Rusty	26 episodes
1999–2002	Rocket Power	Young Tito, Schoolgirl, Bawling Kid	5 episodes
2000	Teacher's Pet	Tyler / Tayler / Trevor	3 episodes
2000	The Wild Thornberrys	Tano	Episode: "Cheetahs Never Prosper"
2000–2001	Zombie College	Zelda Cruz	12 episodes
2001	The Oblongs	Milo Oblong, Jared Klimer, The Debbies	13 episodes
2001	The Wild Thornberrys: The Origin of Donnie	Saiful	Television film
2001–2002	Dexter's Laboratory	Beau / Doo Dee / Kid	3 episodes
2001–2003	Lloyd in Space	Zoit / Additional Voices	3 episodes
2001–2003	Time Squad	Otto Osworth / Additional voices	17 episodes
2002	Teamo Supremo	Scooter Lad, Timmy, Patty Perkin	2 episodes
2002	As Told by Ginger	Dustin	Episode: "April Fools"
2002–2003	What's New, Scooby-Doo?	Chris / Eddie, Janey Miller, Bobby Blather	2 episodes
2003–2007	Jakers! The Adventures of Piggley Winks	Hector MacBadger	46 episodes
2003	Kid Notorious	Unknown voice	Episode: "The Nazi Party"
2003–2004	All Grown Up!	Sean Butler	7 episodes
2005	Bratz	Roberta	Episode: "It's Not About Me Week"
2005	Rugrats Pre-School Daze	Lucas	4 episodes
2006	Danger Rangers	Martin	Episode: "Safe and Sound"
2006	Lilo & Stitch: The Series	Ashley Spinelli	Episode: "Lax: Experiment #285"
2006–2007	Squirrel Boy	Andy Johnson, additional voices	18 episodes
2007	Shorty McShorts' Shorts	Unknown voice	Episode: "Troy Ride"
2007	American Dragon: Jake Long	Monica	Episode: "Game On"
2007–2014	WordGirl	Eileen / Birthday Girl, additional voices	8 episodes
2008	El Tigre: The Adventures of Manny Rivera	Tattoo / Marni	Episode: "Wrong and Dance/Love and War"
2008–2009	The Drinky Crow Show	Mademoiselle DeBoursay, Claire, additional voices	7 episodes
2010	Ben 10: Alien Force	Kevin's Mom	Episode: "Vendetta"
2010	Zevo-3	Angel	2 episodes
2010–2013	Pound Puppies	Gwen / Taboo, additional voices	9 episodes
2010–2025	Phineas and Ferb	Melanie, Blonde Girl, additional voices	10 episodes
2011	The Mighty B!	Murdock	Episode: "Gorillas in the Midst"
2011	Mongo Wrestling Alliance	Acid Alice Kleberkuh	8 episodes
2011	Pixie Hollow Games	Vidia	Television special
2011	The Problem Solverz	Sweetie Creamie, additional voices	Episode: "The Mayan Ice Cream Caper"
2011	Beavis and Butt-Head	Crystal / Sapphire, additional voices	3 episodes
2011	Unsupervised	One-Eyed Donnie	Episode: "Field of Dreams... and Dogs"
2011	Kung Fu Panda: Legends of Awesomeness	Fang	Episode: "Challenge Day"
2012	ThunderCats	Pumyra	6 episodes
2012–2020	Bob's Burgers	Olsen Benner, additional voices	16 episodes
2013	Out There	Joanie Novak (Chris' mom)	10 episodes
2013	Pixie Hollow Bake Off	Vidia	Television special
2013–2017	Uncle Grandpa	Mary / Additional voices	4 episodes
2014	Chozen	Unknown voice	Episode: "Beef"
2014	Sofia the First	Rosey	Episode: "The Enchanted Feast"
2014–2016	TripTank	Donnie / Wanda / Tina / Additional voices	11 episodes
2015	Stone Quackers	Binky / Mean Cop / Hawk	2 episodes
2015	Penn Zero: Part-Time Hero	Drab Lieutenant	Episode: "It's a Colorful Life"
2015	Guardians of the Galaxy	Ma Raccoon / Sis Raccoon	Episode: "We Are Family"
2015–2016	Adventure Time	Gunther	2 episodes
2015–2019	Teen Titans Go!	Rose Wilson	4 episodes
2016	Mr. Pickles	Mary	Episode: "Cops and Robbers"
2016	Sanjay and Craig	Chido	2 episodes
2016	The Loud House	Tabby	Episode: "Dance Dance Resolution/A Fair to Remember"
2016–2019	Milo Murphy's Law	Brigette Murphy	24 episodes
2016–2019	The Big Bang Theory	Halley Wolowitz	10 episodes
2017	Lego Star Wars: The Freemaker Adventures	Elan / Ymojin	Episode: "The Lost Crysals of Qalydon"
2017	Jeff & Some Aliens	Kiki / Alice / Additional voices	Episode: "Jeff & Some Love Simulations"
2017–2019	Star vs. the Forces of Evil	Various voices	6 episodes
2019	Costume Quest	Jackie Carver / Additional voices	3 episodes
2019	Rick and Morty	Angie Flynt / Vermigurber's Child	2 episodes
2019–2022	Pete the Cat	Mrs. Tallulah Toad / Grumpy's Mom	8 episodes
2020–2021	Archer	Sandra	4 episodes
2021	Devil May Care	Regina	7 episodes
2021	Big Mouth	Sonya	7 episodes
2021	Saturday Morning All Star Hits!	Digit / Argie B.	5 episodes
2021–2022	Fairfax	Phyllis	5 episodes
2021–2022	Tuca & Bertie	Dr. Joanne	6 episodes
2021–2024	The Ghost and Molly McGee	Leah Stein-Torres	7 episodes
2022	Little Demon	Sea Hag	Episode: "Wet Bodies"
2022	Slumberkins	Fox's Mother	3 episodes
2022–2023	Human Resources	Sonya Poinsettia	Recurring role
2022–2024	Firebuds	Principal Kagan	3 episodes
2022–2025	Hamster & Gretel	Nordle Ampersand	9 episodes
2023	Oddballs	Irma / Acorn	2 episodes
2023	Moon Girl and Devil Dinosaur	Rabbi Ryda	Episode: "Today, I Am a Woman"
2023	Fired on Mars	Reagan	4 episodes
2024–2026	SuperKitties	Aunt Lola	3 episodes
2026	Star Wars: Maul – Shadow Lord	Rheena Sul	3 episodes

=== Web ===
List of voice performances in web and podcast series
Year	Title	Role	Notes	Ref.
2020	Day by Day	Ms. Carol	Podcast series, episode: "Relocation"	
2025	Guys Next Door	Amber Rio	Web series, episode: "Pilot"	

=== Video games ===
List of voice performances in video games
Year	Title	Voice role	Notes
1996	Pajama Sam: No Need to Hide When It's Dark Outside	Pajama Sam	
1997	Fallout	Nicole	
1998	Grim Fandango	Carla / Pugsy	
1998	Pajama Sam 2: Thunder and Lightning Aren't so Frightening	Pajama Sam	
1998	Pajama Sam's Lost and Found	Pajama Sam	
1998	Arthur's Math Carnival	Arthur Read	
1999	Arthur's Thinking Games	Arthur Read	
2000	Arthur's Reading Games	Arthur Read	
2000	Pajama Sam 3: You Are What You Eat from Your Head to Your Feet	Pajama Sam	
2000	Escape from Monkey Island	Dainty Lady Figurehead	
2000	King of the Hill	Bobby Hill	
2001	Pajama Sam's Games to Play on Any Day	Pajama Sam	
2002	Run Like Hell	Jinx	
2002	LeapFrog: Phonics Program Series	Leap	
2003	LeapFrog: Fiesta in the House/Town	Leap	
2003	Final Fantasy X-2	Shinra	
2005	Chicken Little	Abby Mallard	
2013	Lightning Returns: Final Fantasy XIII	Madam	
2015	Lego Dimensions	Rose Wilson	Uncredited
2022	Warped Kart Racers	Bobby Hill	Archival Recording
