= And They Call It Bobby Love =

- King of the Hill episode
- Episode no.: Season 3 Episode 2
- Directed by: Cyndi Tang-Loveland
- Written by: Norm Hiscock
- Production code: 3ABE01
- Original air date: September 22, 1998

Guest appearances
- Chuck Mangione as himself; Joanna Gleason as Marie's mother; Sarah Michelle Gellar as Marie

Episode chronology
← Previous "Death of a Propane Salesman (Propane Boom 2)"	Next → "Peggy's Headache"
- King of the Hill season 3

"And They Call It Bobby Love" is the second episode of the third season of the American animated series King of the Hill and the 37th episode overall. Written by Norm Hiscock and directed by Cyndi Tang-Loveland, it originally aired on the Fox network on September 22, 1998. The plot follows protagonist Hank Hill's son Bobby's relationship with Marie, a girl whose vegetarian lifestyle clashes strongly with the Hill family's traditionally omnivorous diet, notably with Hank's infatuation with grilling meat. A subplot involves Hank, Dale, Bill, and Boomhauer acquiring an abandoned couch and subsequently adding it to their beer-drinking area of the neighborhood alley.

The episode's title references a lyric from the chorus of the Paul Anka song "Puppy Love". It is the only episode of the series to win a Primetime Emmy Award for Outstanding Animated Program (For Programming less than One Hour).

== Plot ==
Bobby begins a relationship with Marie, a vegetarian, and Hank and the guys find an abandoned couch in their alleyway.

Over the course of his relationship with his newfound girlfriend, Bobby experiences his first kiss, but their relationship quickly sours as Bobby's affection for Marie is revealed to be much greater than her affection for him. As a result, Bobby and Marie decide to end their relationship, and Bobby's reaction to it is strongly negative. To cheer up their son, Hank and Peggy take Bobby to the Panhandler Steakhouse where he sees Marie also having dinner with her parents. He takes on the restaurant's standing challenge to eat a 72-ounce (2 kg) steak in under an hour, simultaneously spiting Marie and finding catharsis by eating the entire steak in just 37 minutes as everyone in the restaurant watches. He later vomits from overeating, which Connie initially feared might be his still reacting to the break-up.

Meanwhile, Hank, Dale, Bill, and Boomhauer discover an abandoned couch in the alley, which they are initially against using as a backdrop for their daily ritual of drinking beer and chatting. As the days progress, they grow to like drinking in their usual spot while sitting on the couch. The couch is also where Bobby and Marie kissed, somewhat to Bill's annoyance. The couch disappears near the end of the episode, but it is ultimately revealed that Bill has moved the couch into his living room.

== Reception ==
The episode was nominated for and ultimately won the Emmy Award for Outstanding Animated Program (For Programming less than One Hour) on September 12, 1999. The A.V. Club had it on a list of "10 episodes that made King of the Hill one of the most human cartoons ever" with Genevieve Koski saying the steak eating scene "remains one of the best scenes in the show’s history."
