= Bart Star =

- The Simpsons episode
- Episode no.: Season 9 Episode 6
- Directed by: Dominic Polcino
- Written by: Donick Cary
- Production code: 5F03
- Original air date: November 9, 1997

Guest appearances
- Joe Namath as himself; Roy Firestone as himself; Mike Judge as Hank Hill

Episode features
- Chalkboard gag: "I did not invent Irish dancing"
- Couch gag: Everyone sits on the couch and is crushed into a cuboid block by a compactor.
- Commentary: Mike Scully; George Meyer; Donick Cary; Nancy Cartwright; Dan Castellaneta; Dominic Polcino

Episode chronology
← Previous "The Cartridge Family"	Next → "The Two Mrs. Nahasapeemapetilons"
- The Simpsons season 9

"Bart Star" is the sixth episode of the ninth season of the American animated television series The Simpsons. It originally aired on Fox in the United States on November 9, 1997. Written by Donick Cary and directed by Dominic Polcino, the episode guest starred Joe Namath, Roy Firestone and Mike Judge. In this episode, Homer becomes the coach of a pee-wee football team and makes Bart the quarterback, to the displeasure of the rest of the team and Bart himself.

The episode was critically well received. The title is a play on the name of American football quarterback Bart Starr.

== Plot ==
Following a health convention held in Springfield, the town's children, including Bart, are deemed to be overweight. To help them stay in shape, their parents enroll them in pee-wee football. The coach, Ned Flanders, keeps the team undefeated, but Homer heckles him relentlessly. Ned finally snaps and turns the job over to Homer, who then admits that Flanders was doing a good job.

Homer initially acts tough towards his son, but when he is reminded of how his father Abe was hard on him as a child, he decides to be nicer to Bart. The next day, he cuts many players from the team and replaces star quarterback Nelson with Bart. Bart is unable to play his position well and causes the team's first loss, earning him and Homer their ire. While training at night, Bart meets Joe Namath, who promises to help him but leaves without doing so.

Lisa suggests that Bart pretend he is injured to get out of quarterbacking, which he eagerly does, but Homer claims that without Bart the team must forfeit. This causes Bart to become angry and quit the team. For the next game, Nelson plays as quarterback again and the team wins, but Homer has nobody to celebrate with and becomes lonely. Afterward, Homer finds Bart and persuades him to rejoin the team in his old position. The next day, during the championship game, the score is tied when Chief Wiggum comes to arrest Nelson. Bart pretends he is Nelson and is arrested in his place, letting the team win the championship.

After Bart is taken away, Namath informs the audience to get their cars checked for vapor lock. Namath then smiles after his advice thinking that the show has ended but when he realizes he still on the air, Namath drops his smile and the episode ends proper.

== Production ==
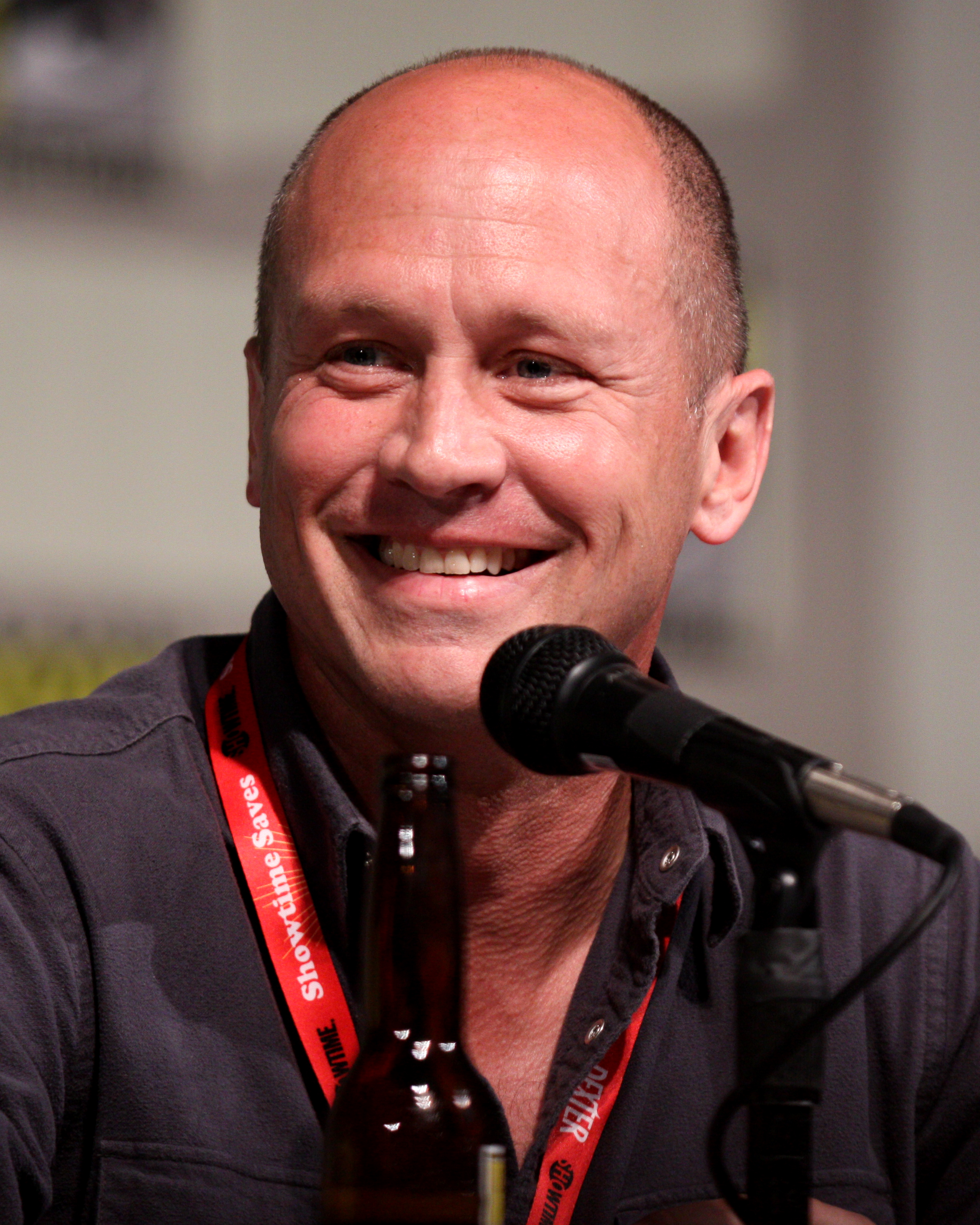
Mike Judge voiced character Hank Hill in a cameo cross-promotion for his animated series King of the Hill.

The episode was written by Donick Cary, who was inspired by his experience in high school with a football coach who had a son on the team. Similarly, show runner Mike Scully had been on a soccer team whose coach would give his son special treatment.

George Meyer obtained inspiration for a scene where Rainier Wolfcastle taunts the children from an experience he had with Arnold Schwarzenegger. He was following Schwarzenegger during a hike, and overheard him taunting his children. Schwarzenegger's influence was seen in the same scene, as he was appointed to be the chairman of the President's Council on Physical Fitness and Sports, on which he served from 1990 to 1993.

Throughout the episode, Homer dresses in homage to Dallas Cowboys player Tom Landry. Homer previously bought Landry's hat in "You Only Move Twice". The final scene took a long time to write, as the writing staff found it difficult to come up with a resolution that would end on positive terms for Bart and Homer.

=== Casting ===
Joe Namath, Roy Firestone and Mike Judge guest-starred in the episode. In a July 28, 1997, interview with USA Today, Mike Scully said that Namath's cameo was "an homage to all those '60s sitcoms where an athlete would drop in on the young kid (in this case, Bart) who's having problems and give him some great advice to help him out and say things like, 'Sure, sports is fun but school is great, too.'"

Judge's appearance as Hank Hill was a cross-promotion for his animated series King of the Hill, which followed The Simpsons on Fox's 1997 Sunday schedule. Other King of the Hill characters (Hank's niece Luanne, Hank's wife Peggy, Hank's son Bobby, and Dale Gribble, Bill Dauterive and Jeff Boomhauer) were present, where they watch Springfield's game against Arlen, where Hank exclaims "We drove 2,000 miles for this?" after Arlen loses the game. In the USA Today interview, Scully remarked that they only had brief cameos since "I don't want to oversell it, because I don't want Mike Judge to think I'm exploiting him." Scully added in a separate July 1997 interview with the Orlando Sentinel that there was no rivalry between the two shows, stating "we're friends with a lot of people over there. The two shows have helped each other out a lot." Although "Bart Star" portrayed King of the Hill characters existing in the Simpsons' universe, the Simpsons only exist as fictional characters in King of the Hill, according to its producer Greg Daniels (a former Simpsons writer).

Marv Albert was originally going to play Firestone's part as a sports radio host, but was dropped following sexual assault charges against him made around when the episode was in pre-production. Albert would later appear, however, in the season 20 episode "The Burns and the Bees".

== Reception ==
In its original broadcast, "Bart Star" finished 27th in ratings for the week of November 3–9, 1997, with a Nielsen rating of 10.8, equivalent to approximately 10.6 million viewing households. It was the third-highest-rated show on the Fox network that week, following The X-Files and King of the Hill.

Since airing, the episode has received positive reviews from critics. Gary Russell and Gareth Roberts, the authors of the book I Can't Believe It's a Bigger and Better Updated Unofficial Simpsons Guide, called the episode "fun" and said "Homer is just too stupid for words, but that's excusable because we finally see Ned Flanders lose it, big time!" In 2011, Keith Plocek of LA Weekly's Squid Ink blog named the scene in which Homer tries to purchase beer that has candy floating in it at the Kwik-E-Mart as the fourth best food moment on the show.

The director of "Bart Star", Dominic Polcino, calls it his favorite of the episodes he directed.
