= King of the Hill season 15 =

King of the Hill
- Season 15
- Promotional poster
- Showrunner: Saladin Patterson
- Starring: Mike Judge; Kathy Najimy; Pamela Adlon; Stephen Root; Lauren Tom; Toby Huss
- No. of episodes: 10

Release
- Original network: Hulu
- Original release: July 20, 2026

Season chronology
- ← Previous; Season 14

The fifteenth season of King of the Hill, the second in the revival series, released on July 20, 2026.

== Production ==
The showrunner for the season continues to be Saladin K. Patterson.

== Episodes ==
No. overall	No. in season	Title	Directed by	Written by	Original release date	Prod. code
270	1	"Failure to Hard Launch"	Kyounghee Lim	Erica Rosbe	July 20, 2026	FABE03
The guys compete with Peggy to find the owner of an electric truck parked outside of the Hill’s home. Bobby deals with the fallout of Chane learning about his new relationship.
271	2	"Care of the Dog"	Kelly Turnbull	Sam Fishell	July 20, 2026	FABE01
Peggy convinces Hank to foster a small, ailing dog. Bobby struggles to bring Kahn and Minh together for Connie’s birthday.
272	3	"Searching for Bobby Phisher"	Annie Li	Jeremy Hsu	July 20, 2026	FABE02
After Hank and Peggy fall victim to a phone scam, Bobby hatches a plan to restore his dad’s confidence.
273	4	"Hank Encounters of the Nerd Kind"	Michael Baylis	Stephanie M. Johnson	July 20, 2026	FABE04
Hank gets himself in trouble with the Sci-Fi community when he agrees to help Bobby run a food truck at a convention. Peggy and Minh are forced to write together when they both take a poetry class.
274	5	"The Best Little Marriage in Texas"	Allan Jacobsen	Bob Daily	July 20, 2026	FABE05
Wanting to get more involved at their church, Peggy and Hank find themselves volunteering at a marriage retreat. Bobby struggles in the audition process for a reality cooking show. Note: This is the final episode to feature Jonathan Joss as the voice of John Redcorn.
275	6	"Ch-Ch-Ch-Changes"	Samantha Arnett	Anthony Del Broccolo	July 20, 2026	FABE06
Hank helps Peggy come to terms with menopause. Kahn nudges Bill to make some life changes, causing Dale and Boomhauer to question Kahn’s intentions.
276	7	"Hank Ruffles Some Feathers"	Annie Li	Laura Cebula	July 20, 2026	FABE08
Hank and Peggy push Boomhauer to bond with his girlfriend’s son, Luke Jr., through raising chickens. Bobby steps in when he witnesses Connie flounder at her new job.
277	8	"No-Cuddle Offense"	Kyounghee Lim	Sam Fishell & Jeremy Hsu	July 20, 2026	FABE09
The guys intervene when Bill gets caught up in a new therapy. Peggy defies Bobby and talks to a restaurant critic on his behalf.
278	9	"Reality Bites"	Michael Baylis	Tahir Bell	July 20, 2026	FABE10
The guys find a Civil War cannon and disagree about what to do with it. Bobby's participation on "King of the Grill" strains his relationship with Connie as they grapple with moving in together.
279	10	"Propane Recall"	Kelly Turnbull	Norm Hiscock	July 20, 2026	FABE07
When his former colleagues come to him for help, Hank reflects on the events that led to him leaving Strickland Propane, moving to Saudi Arabia and how Bobby discovered his passion for cooking.

== Reception ==
=== Viewership ===
King of the Hill ranked No. 4 on Hulu's "Top 15 Today" list—a daily updated list of the platform's most-watched titles—upon its Season 15 premiere on July 20, before moving to No. 1 the following day. The series remained on Hulu's "Top 15 Today" list from its premiere on July 20 through August 5, 2026. Nielsen Media Research, which records streaming viewership on U.S. television screens, reported that King of the Hill recorded 658 million minutes of watch time from July 20 to 26, ranking as the fourth most-streamed original series of the week. During the following week, from July 27 to August 2, the series generated 429 million minutes of watch time, ranking eighth. Between August 10–16, King of the Hill generated 287 million minutes of watch time, re-entering the Nielsen Streaming's Top 10 Originals at No. 10.

=== Critical response ===
The season holds a 100% approval rating on Rotten Tomatoes based on 13 critics' reviews.
