= Big Texan Steak Ranch =

Coordinates: 35.194055°N 101.754448°W

The Big Texan Steak Ranch
- Sign advertising the Big Texan Steak Ranch
- Interactive map of The Big Texan Steak Ranch

Restaurant information
- Established: 1960; 66 years ago
- Food type: Steakhouse
- Dress code: Casual
- Location: 7701 Interstate 40 Access Rd, Amarillo, Texas, United States
- Website: www.bigtexan.com

The Big Texan Steak Ranch is a large steakhouse restaurant and motel located in Amarillo, Texas. It is a roadside attraction known for competitive eating.

The restaurant opened in 1960 and was originally located on Route 66. It relocated to its present location on an Interstate 40 frontage road in 1970. The building is painted a bright yellow, with blue trim. A large bull statue advertises their "free" 72 ounce steak eating challenge.

== Description ==
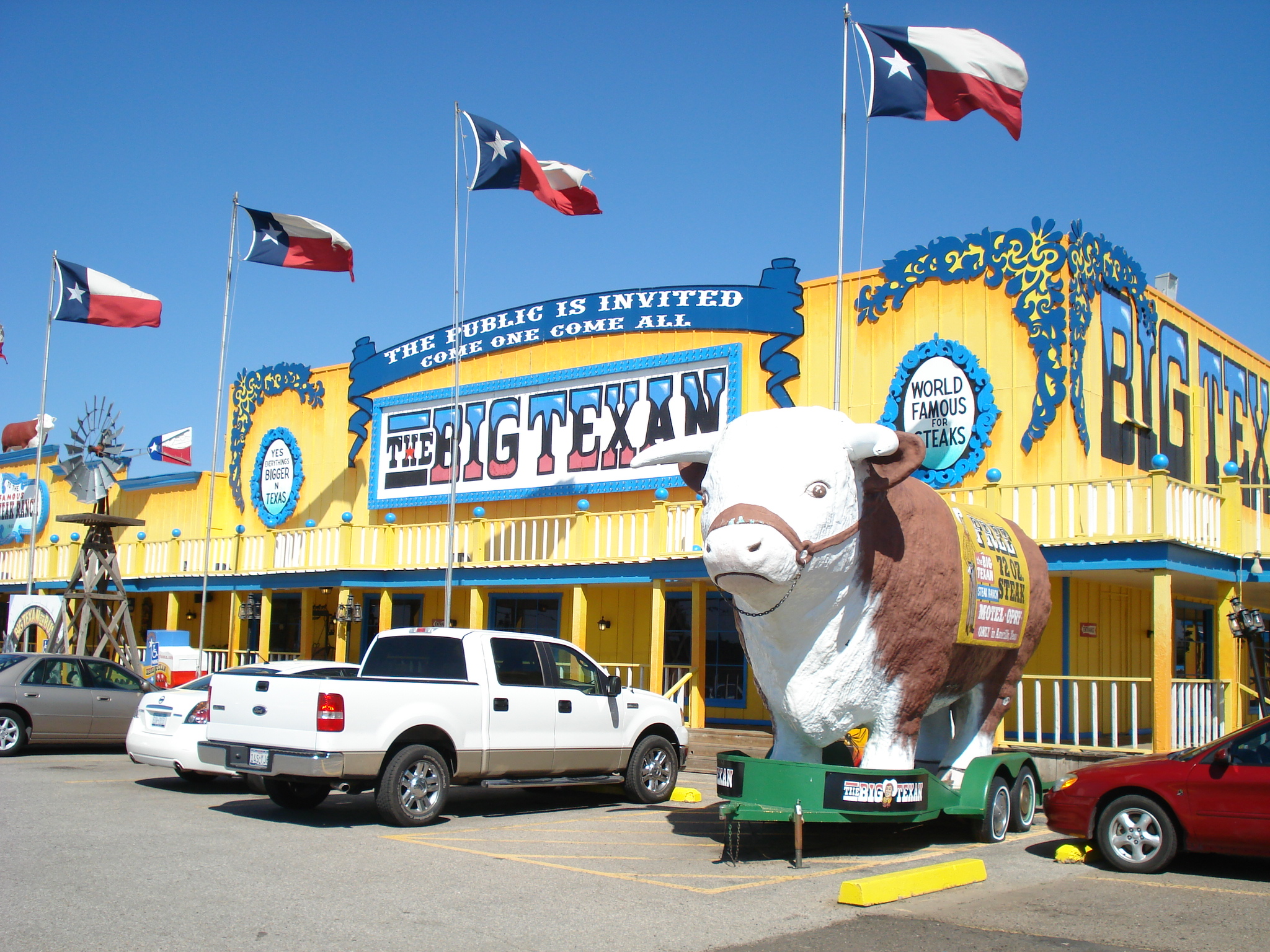
The brighly colored restaurant is hard to miss

Located on a frontage road alongside Interstate 40, (formerly Route 66), the restaurant has 650 seats, and three-quarters of its customers are tourists.

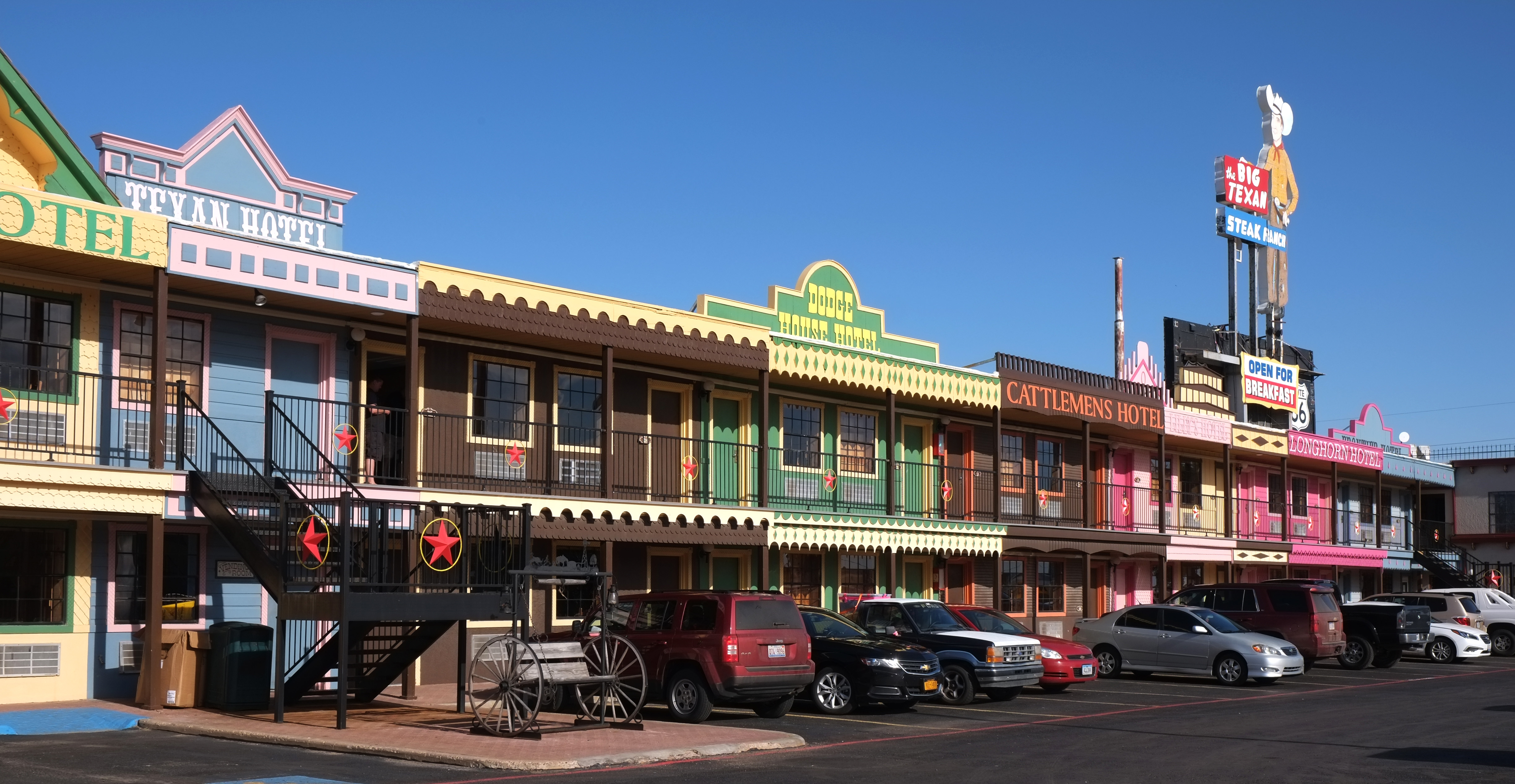
The motel at the Big Texan Steak Ranch is decorated like several small hotels

The adjacent motel has 54 rooms and 28 stalls for horses. Beth Duke, who has worked to help revitalize Amarillo's business district, described the restaurant as "an international icon because it captures the spirit of Texas. It’s big — big promotions, big events, big steaks, and the kind of cowboy heritage that people want to see when they come to Texas."

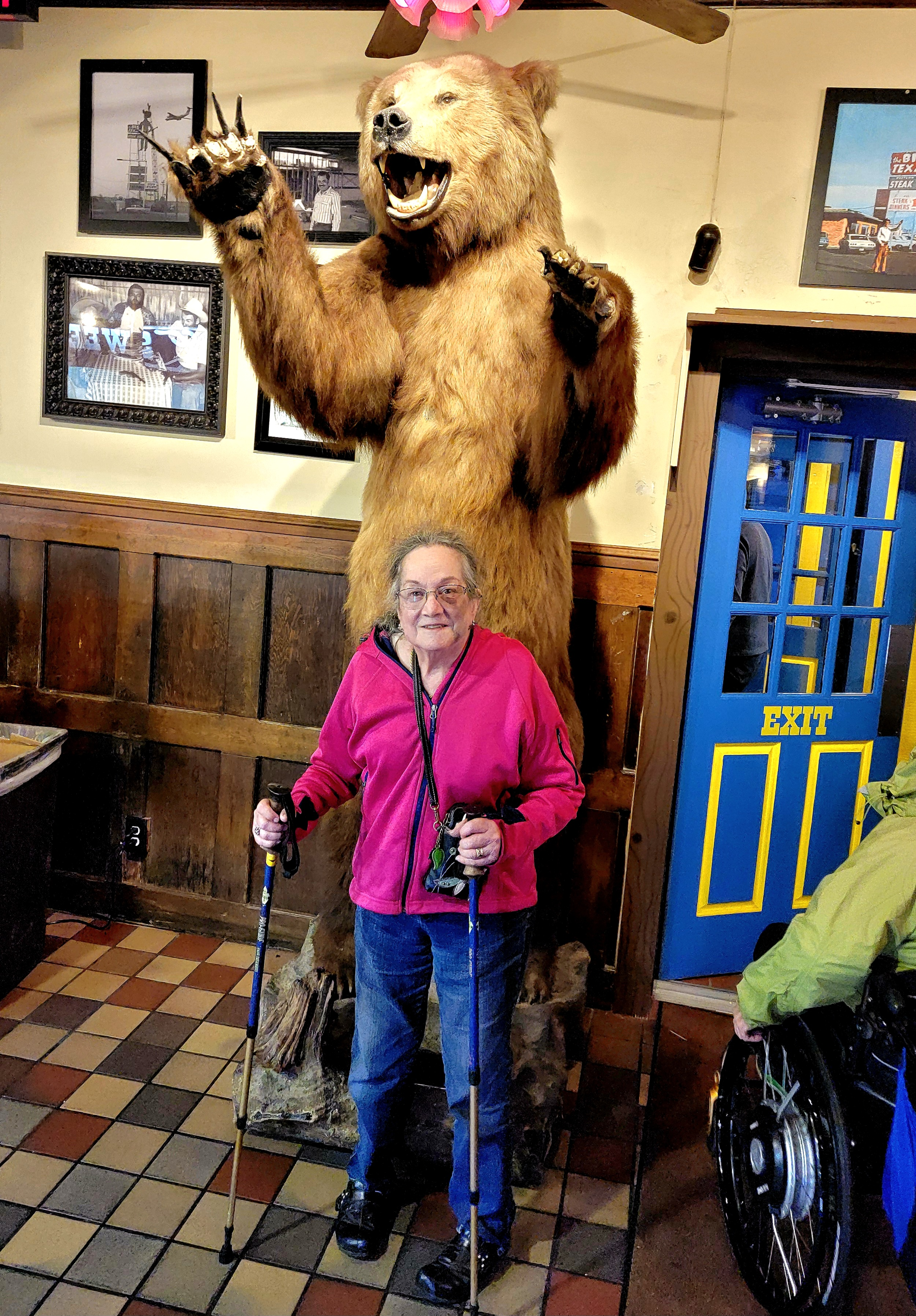
Taxidermied grizzly bear and a customer in the lobby

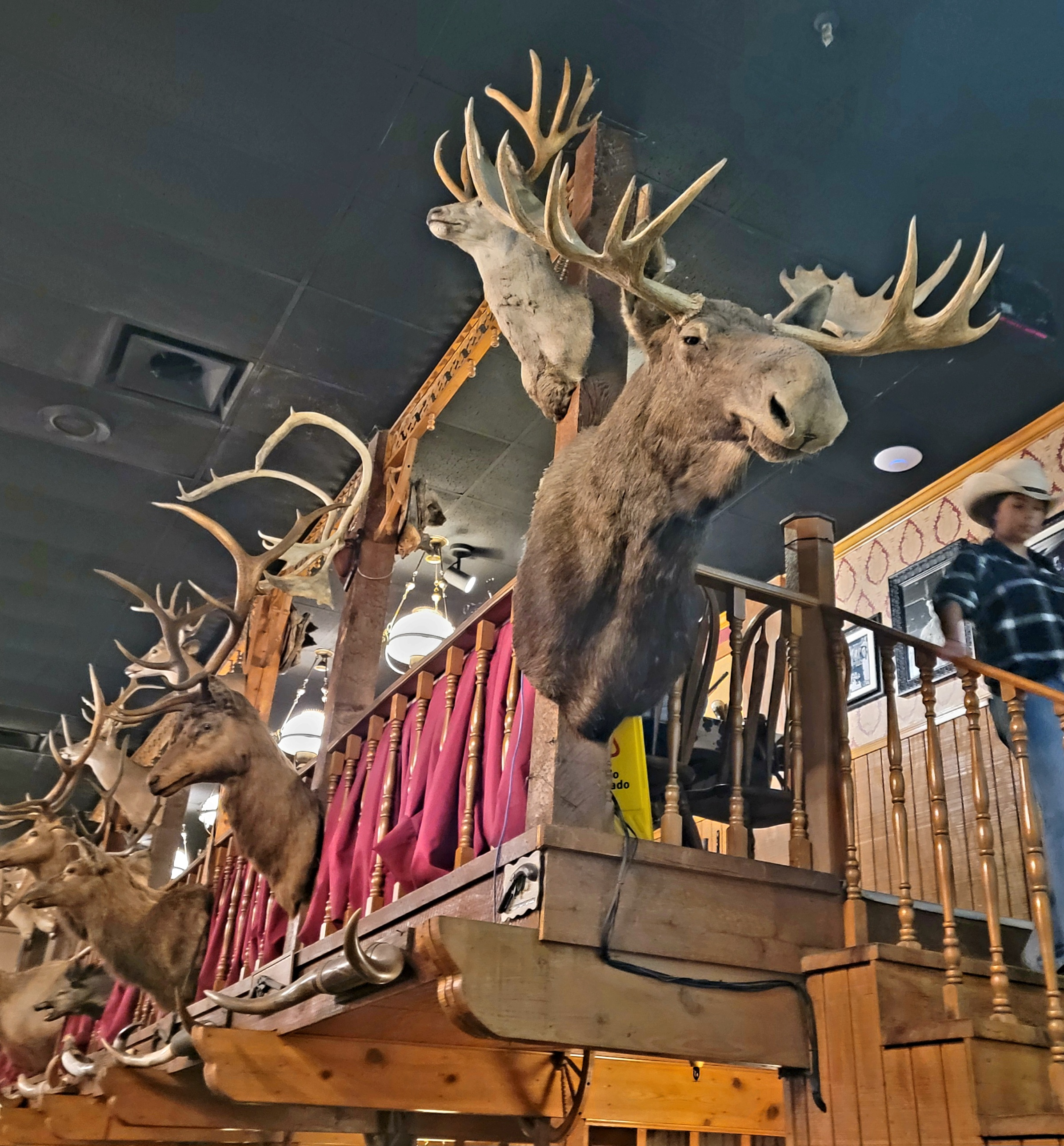
The interior décor at the Big Texan steakhouse includes many taxidermied animal heads

The restaurant's décor features chandeliers made out of wagon wheels and taxidermied big game specimens. Regular events include country and western music performances and Texas hold'em competitions.

In addition to the gigantic steak dinner, the restaurant also serves smaller steaks, seafood, sandwiches and quesadillas. Another menu item is Rocky Mountain oysters, which are battered and fried bull testicles.

== 72-Ounce Steak Challenge ==
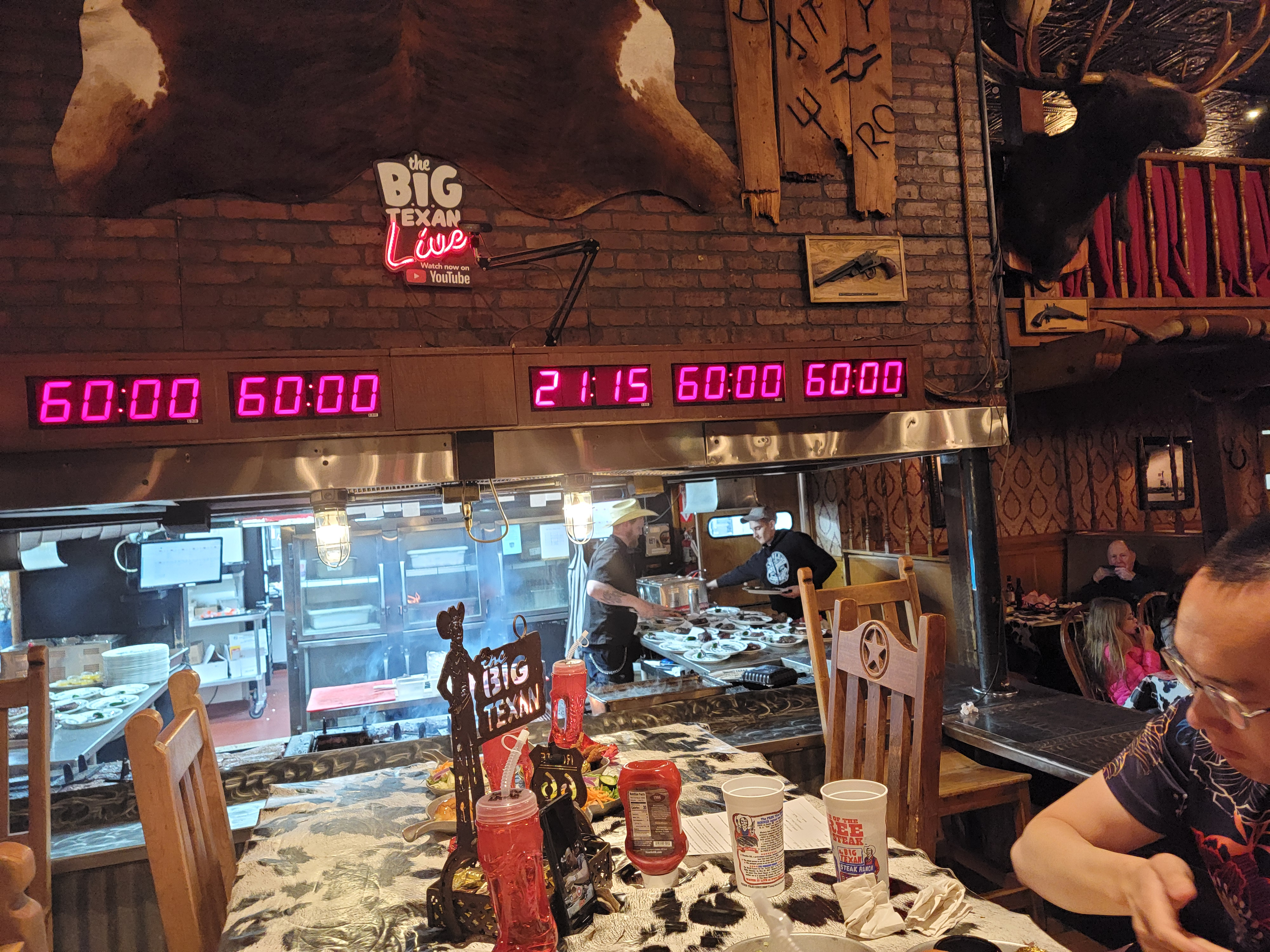
The competition table at the Big Texan Steak Ranch includes countdown clocks and is video livestreamed

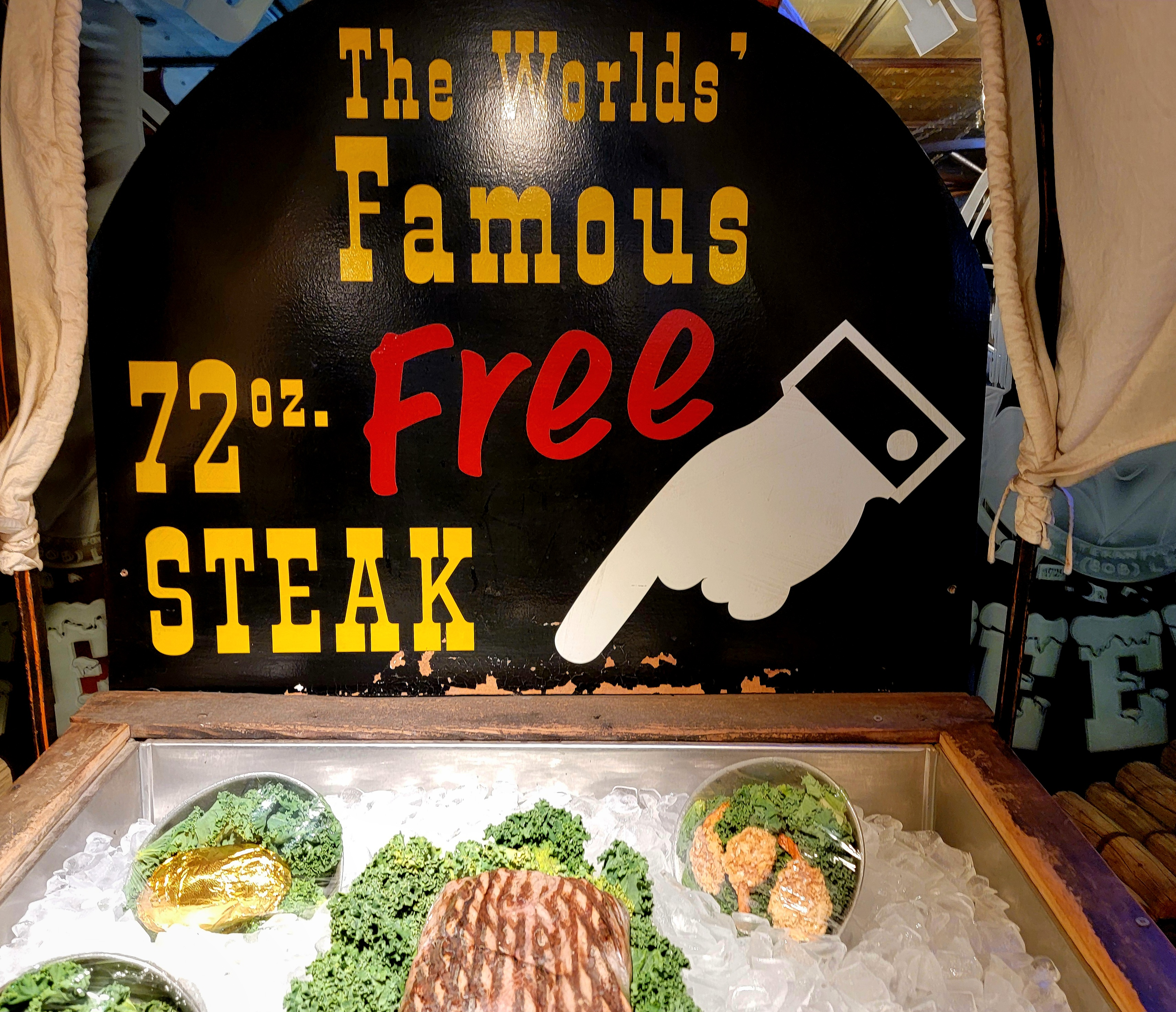
Sign at the Big Texan steakhouse

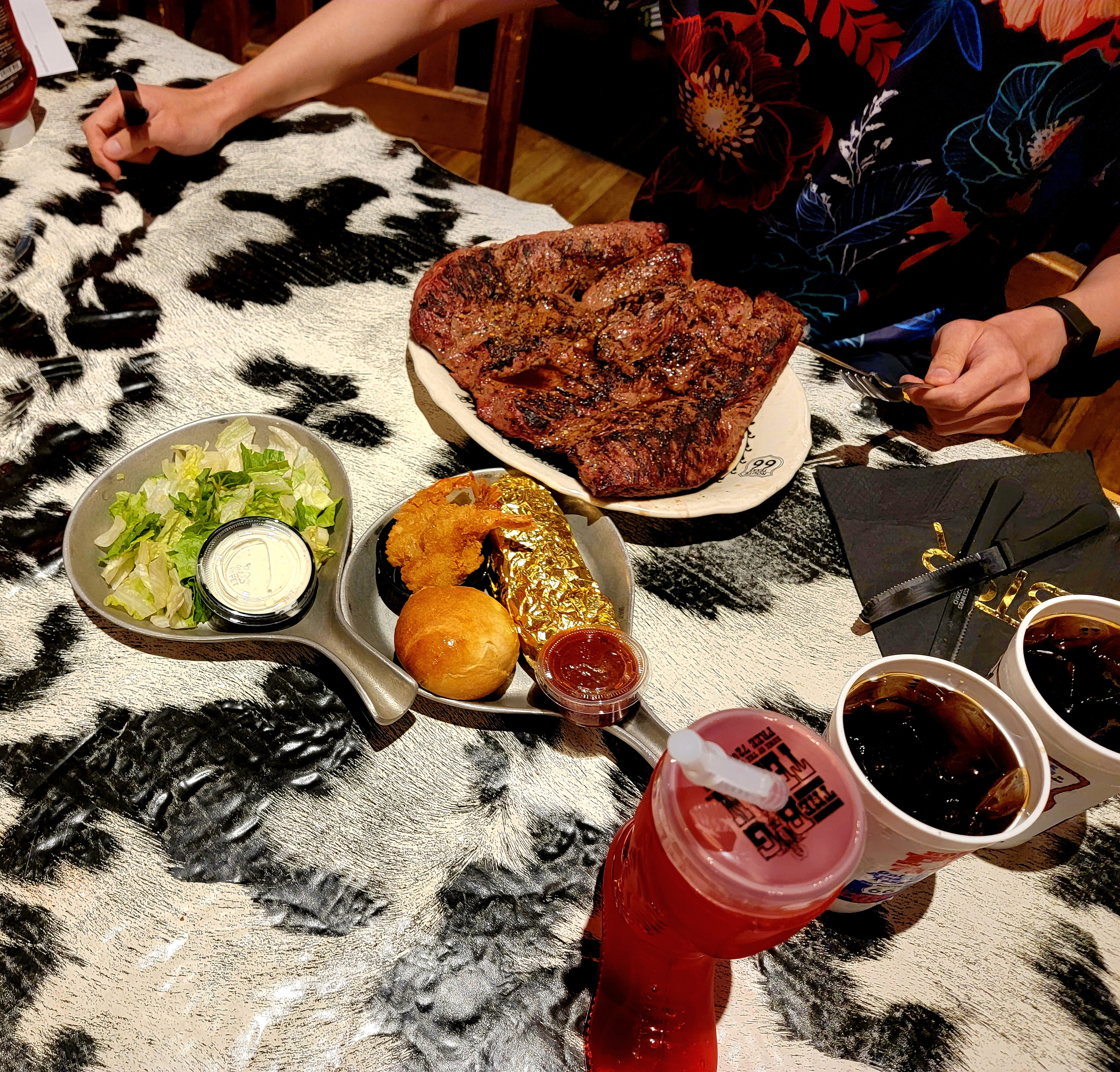
72 ounce steak challenge at The Big Texan Steak Ranch

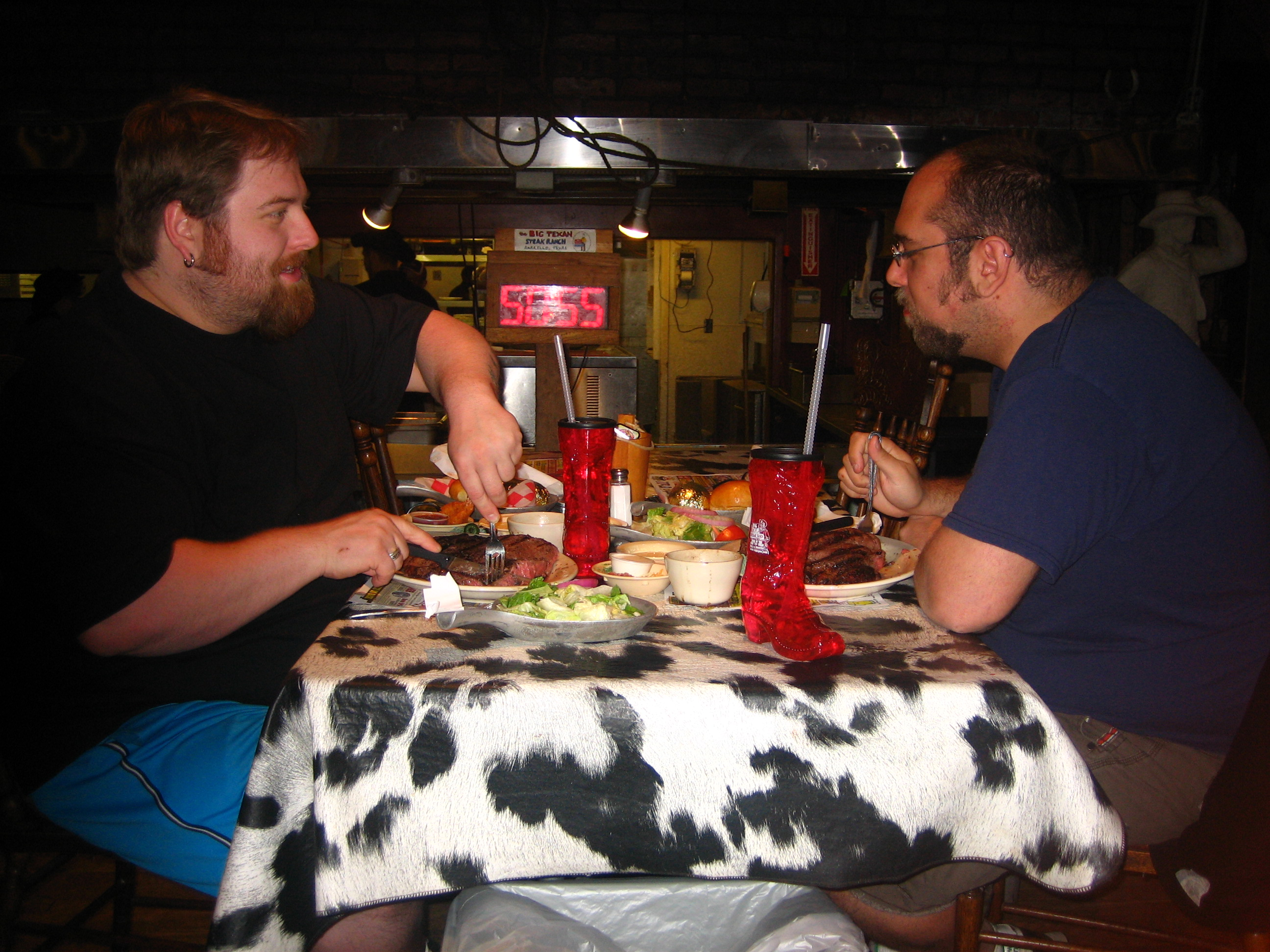
Two men take the steak challenge on April 6, 2008

The Big Texan is best known for its 72 ounce (4.5 pounds or 2.04 kg) steak. The steak is free to anyone who, in one hour or less, can eat the entire meal, consisting of the steak itself, a bread roll with butter, a baked potato, shrimp cocktail, and a side salad; otherwise, the meal costs $72.00. Those who have successfully consumed the 72 ounce steak challenge have their names recorded and posted at the restaurant. The table at which the steak is eaten is recorded on a 24/7 live stream which can be found on the restaurant's website. To date, over 10,000 people out of about 90,000 people who attempted this challenge have accomplished this feat.

According to the restaurant, when featured on the TV show Man v. Food, the challenge started in 1960, when founder Bob Lee decided to hold a contest over which of the cowboys working in the stockyards could eat the most steaks in one hour, with a prize of $5 (equivalent to $54 in 2025) at stake. One cowboy ate four and a half 1-pound steaks, a shrimp cocktail, a baked potato, a dinner roll, and a salad in the hour's time to win the $5. Lee was so impressed with the achievement that he declared, "Whoever eats that much again in my restaurant, he gets it for free." Those who take on the 72oz steak challenge are required to sign a waiver acknowledging the rules. They pay for the meal in advance and, if they are successful, their money is refunded. The steak is cooked to the participant's preference, and the challenge takes place at a table for six on a raised platform in the middle of the main dining room. Before the challenge officially begins, participants are allowed one bite of the steak to verify it is cooked to their liking.

The record for the shortest time to finish the entire 72oz steak challenge had been held by competitive eating champion Joey Chestnut (at 8 minutes and 52 seconds), breaking Frank Pastore's 1987 record (of 9 minutes 30 seconds, which stood for 21 years) on his March 24, 2008 visit. On May 26, 2014, he was bested by 125-pound competitive eater Molly Schuyler, who polished off the meal in just 4 minutes 58 seconds, and came back for seconds (14 minutes and 57 seconds for two meals). She did not, however, eat a third steak meal in the same hour. Schuyler returned on April 19, 2015 and would finish her first meal in 4 minutes 18 seconds, beating her own record by 40 seconds. She had defeated four other teams of competitors in the challenge, devouring two more meals in twenty minutes. The unofficial record (for all animals, including humans) was held by a 500-pound Siberian tiger who ate the steak in 90 seconds in 1999, until bested by a lioness in 2012 clocking in at 80 seconds.

== In media ==
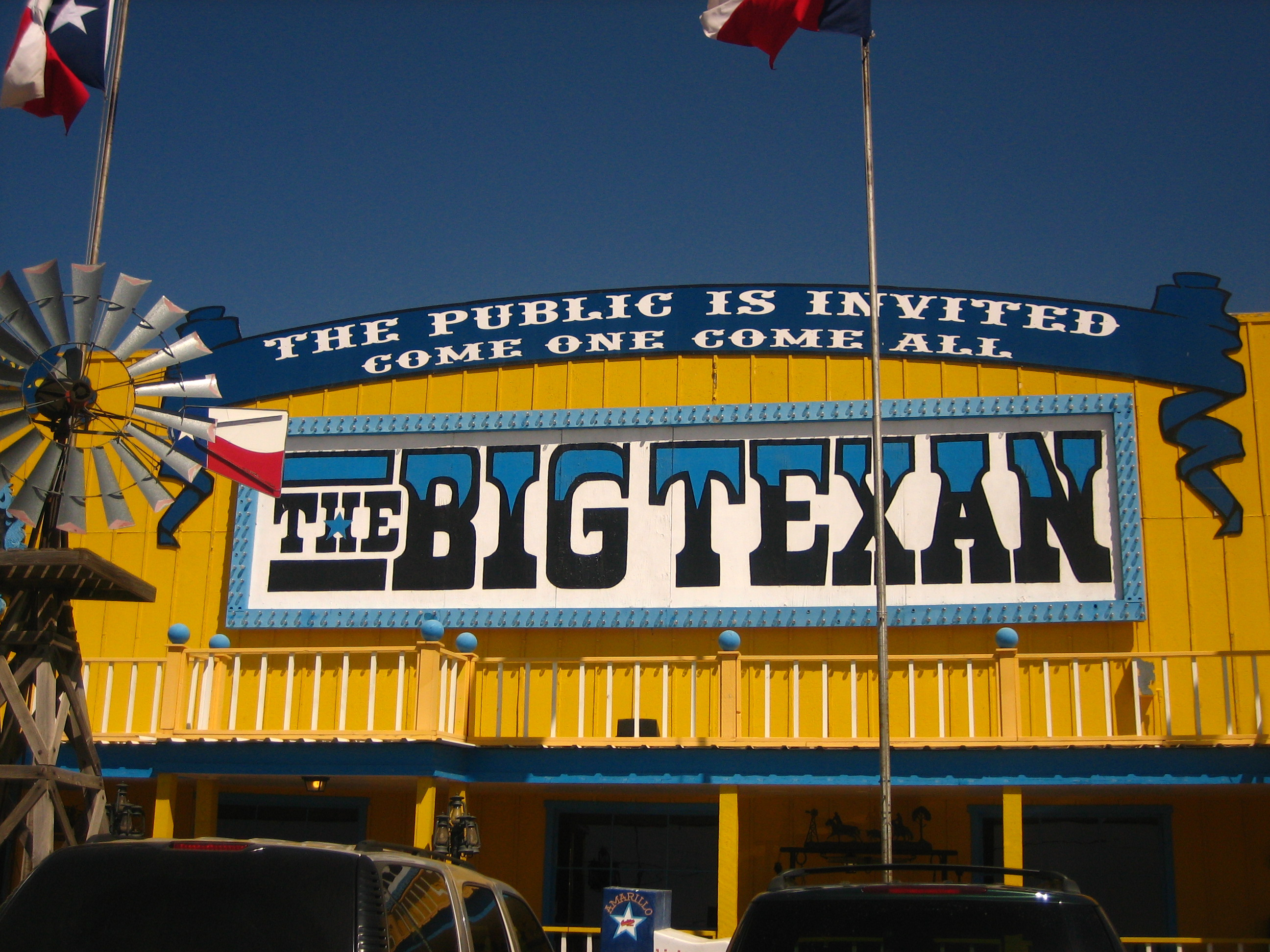
Close-up of entrance to Big Texan Steak Ranch

The 72 ounce Steak Challenge meal is shown in the movie Waking Up in Reno, with Billy Bob Thornton taking the challenge. It is also shown on the Travel Channel's Man v. Food, where host Adam Richman completes the challenge and in Anthony Bourdain: No Reservations, where Bourdain declines to compete but his cameraman takes part and fails.

The Big Texan Steak Ranch is known for its Cadillac white stretch limos with longhorn hood ornaments, one of which appears in the 2006 animated film Cars as Texas oil baron Tex Dinoco. Becky Ransom and the Big Texan Steak Ranch ("free 72-ounce steak if consumed in 60 minutes") are acknowledged in the film's credits.

In the Season 3 episode of King of the Hill, "And They Call It Bobby Love", the Steak Ranch was parodied with a similar restaurant called the Panhandler Steakhouse. Bobby Hill accepts the challenge only to spite the girl that spurned his affections (who was also a vegetarian). He completes the challenge but upon returning home subsequently vomits.

In a season 10 episode of The Simpsons "Maximum Homerdrive" Homer accepts a big-steak eating contest.

A billboard advertising the restaurant appears in a panel in George Takei's autobiographical graphic novel They Called Us Enemy.

== Big Texan Motel ==
Located adjacent to the restaurant on The Big Texan Steak Ranch property is the 54-unit Big Texan Motel. The cinder-block construction motel is designed to resemble a main street in an old west town, and features Texas-themed decor and a Texas-shaped pool. In 2004, a 20-stall stable was added behind the main motel building.

== See also ==
- List of motels
- List of steakhouses
