= Roy Firestone =

American sports journalist

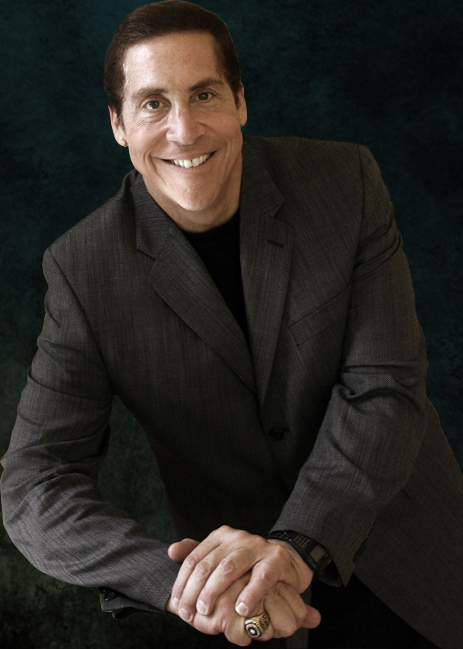
- Firestone in 2009
- Born: December 8, 1953 (age 72); Miami Beach, Florida, U.S.
- Occupations: Sportscaster; Journalist

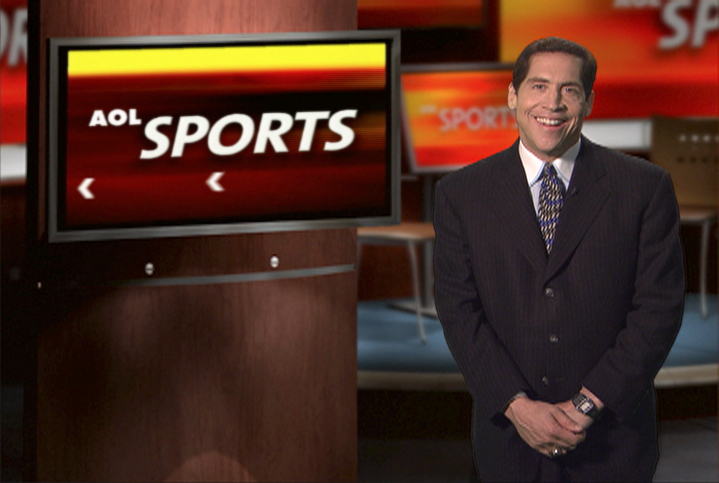
Firestone on Time Out with Roy Firestone in July 2009

Roy Firestone (born December 8, 1953) is an American sports commentator and journalist. Firestone is a graduate of Miami Beach High School and the University of Miami. He also did a comedy sketch for the University of Miami Pep Club.

== Television career ==
Firestone began his career as a sports anchor and reporter in Miami, working briefly at WTVJ, before moving to Los Angeles as a sports anchor for KNXT/KCBS-TV from 1977 to 1985. He was also the host of HDNet's Face to Face with Roy Firestone and AOL's Time Out with Roy Firestone.

He appeared on the Late Show with David Letterman, Larry King Live, Super Dave Osborne and Nightline. He has also performed for numerous corporate clients including Anheuser Busch, Chevron, Nike, Whirlpool and Toyota. Firestone currently appears as a guest regularly on Good Day L.A. which airs on KTTV in Los Angeles covering local and national sports.

Firestone also provided the voice of the classic cartoon character Egghead in the 1988 Warner Bros. compilation film Daffy Duck's Quackbusters and appeared in the 1996 movie Jerry Maguire. He starred in a Married... with Children episode and presented the Al Bundy Sport Spectacular. Firestone also made an appearance as himself in a 1997 episode of Everybody Loves Raymond, the "Bart Star" episode of The Simpsons and "The White League", episode of In Living Color.

=== ESPN ===
From 1980 to 1994, he was the host of ESPN's interview program SportsLook, later renamed Up Close. He also served as a color commentator for the network's first season of Sunday Night Football telecasts in 1987. In 2016, clips from the 1992 episode where he interviewed O. J. Simpson were used in O.J.: Made in America, specifically the portion that had Firestone state, "Not to dredge it up again, but more or less, talk about how things can get distorted to such a point that you are portrayed as a bad guy. New Year's Eve, you had too much to drink ...", which referred to Simpson pleading no contest to spousal abuse of his wife Nicole Brown Simpson in 1989. In response to online criticism, Firestone made a statement about the interview by stating that he felt dirty in his interview in context to what would occur with Simpson and his wife two years after the interview while noting the general attitude toward Simpson and domestic violence were different in 1992 than it was in 2016.

== Personal life ==
Firestone is a lifelong fan of the Baltimore Orioles and served as a spring training batboy for the team as a teenager. He spoke on Saturday, September 29, 2012, at Oriole Park at Camden Yards during the unveiling of Brooks Robinson's statue at the ballpark.

== Awards ==
- Seven-time Emmy Award winner
- Seven-time CableACE Award recipient
- In 1991 he was inducted into the Southern California Jewish Sports Hall of Fame.
