= Babes (film) =

2024 film by Pamela Adlon

- Theatrical release poster
- Directed by: Pamela Adlon
- Written by: Ilana Glazer; Josh Rabinowitz
- Produced by: Ilana Glazer; Josh Rabinowitz; Susie Fox; Ashley Fox; Breean Pojunas
- Starring: Ilana Glazer; Michelle Buteau; John Carroll Lynch; Oliver Platt; Sandra Bernhard; Stephan James; Hasan Minhaj
- Cinematography: Jeffrey Kim
- Edited by: Annie Eifrig; Elizabeth Merrick
- Music by: Jay Lifton; Ryan Miller
- Production companies: FilmNation Entertainment; Range Media Partners; Starrpix
- Distributed by: Neon
- Release dates: March 9, 2024 (SXSW); May 17, 2024 (United States)
- Running time: 104 minutes
- Country: United States
- Language: English
- Box office: $3.9 million

Babes is a 2024 American comedy film directed by Pamela Adlon, written by Ilana Glazer and Josh Rabinowitz, and starring Glazer and Michelle Buteau. It is Adlon's feature directorial debut.

The film was released in the United States on May 17, 2024.

== Plot ==
Eden, a passionately single woman, and her best friend Dawn are out on their annual Thanksgiving outing when Dawn goes into labor. After Dawn gives birth, Eden gets sushi for her and her husband Marty. When rejected by hospital staff, she takes the subway home where she meets a man named Claude, with whom she bonds deeply over loss of parents and relationship issues. The two spend the night together and have sex.

One month later, after being ghosted by Claude, Eden invites Dawn, who's been struggling with postpartum and breastfeeding, over to celebrate a relaxing New Year's Eve. The two get drunk and high when Eden, in a lucid state, envisions herself pregnant and takes a multitude of pregnancy tests, which all come back positive. After confirming with an ultrasound, she sets off to locate Claude, who she deduces is the father of the child. After asking mutual friends about Claude's disappearance, they reveal he died the day after Thanksgiving by choking on an almond. When she finds out the baby is 100% healthy, she resolves to keep the pregnancy.

While Eden progresses in her pregnancy, Dawn and Marty struggle with their firstborn's regression in potty-training, and also struggle to find daycare when they return to work. When the two are on a date night, Eden, who is babysitting, attempts to help their child to want to stay grown by showing him an R-rated movie, The Omen.

Upon the next doctor's appointment, at which Eden finds out the sex of the baby, Dawn claims to have a scheduling conflict, so Eden calls her estranged father to join instead. After the meeting, the two reconcile. Eden is dismayed when Dawn's phone location reveals her to be at her house, leading to a confrontation. Dawn criticizes Eden for showing The Omen, which gave their child satanic tendencies, scaring their caretaker and causing Dawn to miss an important meeting. She tells Eden to find a doula, causing tension. Meanwhile, Eden approaches her due date and Dawn continues to struggle with exhaustion and postpartum depression, both at work and at home.

When recommended to go on a "babymoon" to blow off steam and relax before the due date, Dawn sees this as an opportunity to relax, while Eden experiences discomfort throughout the trip. At dinner, Eden proposes the idea of moving in together, which Dawn dismisses, and the two argue; Eden calls Dawn out for leaving hours away to the Upper East Side and complains about being left behind when they're family, while Dawn explains she has a family of her own, and suggests Eden didn't think through the decision of having a baby.

After the trip, tensions are high between the two, and Dawn returns home to a pipe blockage explosion in their sewage system. Dawn and Marty both express their frustrations and complicated feelings being parents balancing work. Dawn then finds out she is set to fly out to San Francisco after being chosen to star in a commercial. Calling Eden from the plane to let her know of the last-minute trip, Dawn realizes Eden has gone into labor. With her doula, Dragana, the two set off to the hospital when Dawn shows up, and the two apologize and reconcile. Eden then gives birth to a girl, whom she names Claudette.

After returning home, Eden and Claudette meet up with Dawn and her family to see the movie for which Claude had filmed a minor role on the night they met. When returning home from the movie, Dawn reveals she's moving back to Eden's neighborhood and the two casually say "see you later,” rather than “goodbye.”

== Cast ==
- Ilana Glazer as Eden
- Michelle Buteau as Dawn
- John Carroll Lynch as Dr. Morris
- Hasan Minhaj as Marty
- Stephan James as Claude
- Oliver Platt as Bernie
- Kenny Lucas as Benny
- Keith Lucas as Bobby
- Sandra Bernhard as Dr. Shirley

== Production ==
In June 2022, it was announced that Adlon would make her feature directorial debut with an untitled pregnancy comedy film written by Glazer and Rabinowitz, and that Glazer and Buteau would star. The next month, it was announced that Lynch, Minhaj, James, Platt, the Lucas Brothers and Bernhard were cast in the film, which was then in production in New York City.

== Release ==
In October 2023, it was announced that Neon acquired U.S. distribution rights to the film, which had officially been titled Babes. It had its world premiere at South by Southwest on March 9, 2024.

The film was released in the United States on May 17, 2024.

== Reception ==
On the review aggregator website Rotten Tomatoes, 87% of 118 critics' reviews are positive, with an average rating of 7.3/10. The website's consensus reads: "Offering an uproariously unvarnished look at motherhood and female friendships, Babes finds Pamela Adlon making an assured feature-length directorial debut with a big assist from stars Ilana Glazer and Michelle Buteau." Metacritic, which uses a weighted average, assigned the film a score of 72 out of 100, based on 30 critics, indicating "generally favorable" reviews.

Lovia Gyarkye of The Hollywood Reporter reviewed the film positively, writing that "Adlon’s feature directorial debut bursts with a boisterous energy from its opening moments. Buteau and Glazer have natural chemistry, enhanced by their respective talents". Ferdosa Abdi of Screen Rant wrote that "the filmmaking team captures an authentic, and often underrepresented, facet of sisterhood and motherhood". Amy Nicholson of The Washington Post said that "it’s a movie that hits you with the same surge of mixed emotions as a hug from a grubby toddler".

Zachary Barnes of The Wall Street Journal described the film as "never very affecting—or, more lethally, very funny ... the kind of comedy that makes you wonder what jokes are, exactly, and if what you just saw contained any". Valerie Complex of Deadline Hollywood said "it presents a series of vignettes on motherhood and female friendship that are at times touching and hilarious but often feel disjointed and unrealistic".
