= Hank Hill =

Fictional character from King of the Hill

- King of the Hill character
- Hank Hill as he appears in the original run of the series (1997–2010)
- First appearance: "Pilot" (1997)
- Created by: Mike Judge; Greg Daniels
- Designed by: Mike Judge
- Voiced by: Mike Judge

In-universe information
- Full name: Hank Rutherford Hill
- Gender: Male
- Occupation: Seller of "propane and propane accessories" Retired (formerly, revival episodes); Manager and owner of Strickland Propane (revival episodes)
- Family: Cotton Hill (father); Tilly Garrison (mother); Didi Hill (stepmother); Chuck Garrison (stepfather); Good Hank "G.H." Hill (half-brother); Junichiro (half-brother); Rita (cousin); Dusty Hill (cousin); Luanne Platter (niece by marriage)
- Spouse: Peggy Hill
- Children: Bobby Hill
- Religion: Methodism (Christianity)
- Nationality: American

Hank Rutherford Hill is an American fictional character and the protagonist of the Fox animated television series King of the Hill. He lives in the fictional town of Arlen, Texas, with his family. In the series' original run, Hank worked as the assistant manager at Strickland Propane as a salesman of propane and propane accessories. In the revival, he is retired after taking up a new job in Saudi Arabia. In the subsequent season, Hank returns to Strickland Propane as the manager and majority owner. He likes to drink beer, typically Alamo brand, in the alley behind his house with his friends. He is voiced by series creator Mike Judge. The Economist described Hank Hill as one of the wisest people on television, and in 1997 Texas Monthly included him on its annual list of the most influential Texans.

== Development ==
When Mike Judge submitted the pilot script and drawings for King of the Hill to the Fox network, network executives advised him that Hank Hill should be younger than 49 years old, as Judge had described the character. Judge received a phone message from a network executive who told him that Hank's age should be 32, the same age as the network's average viewer. Judge later said, "I got all angry, and then I was like, 'Well, wait. It's just a drawing.' So I just went back with the same drawing and said, 'Okay, he's 34.'"

Hank has been compared to Tom Anderson, the "disapproving old man" who is a neighbor of the title characters on Judge's earlier series Beavis and Butt-Head. Television columnist Frank Wooten of The Post and Courier has written, "Hank still looks and sounds like a young Mr. Anderson (beleaguered, baffled Korean War veteran of Beavis and Butt-head). But he's more in touch with contemporary reality (sort of) – and funnier."

Throughout the show's run, Hank's character's personality appears to more primarily be built around the image of the all-American, authoritarian family man. In a 2006 interview, Judge said, "Originally I was going to have Hank be his [Mr. Anderson's] son. I was kind of thinking we'd tie it into Beavis and Butt-Head as a sort of spinoff or something, but Fox said no." Greg Daniels, another creator of the program, has said that Hank Hill is "based on a lot of neighbors I've had… He's upset about how America is changing, and he doesn't know what to do about it."

== Character analysis ==
Describing Hank physically, Jo Johnson has written, "In keeping with [Mike] Judge's tradition of subtlety, the character of Hank Hill is only slightly overweight, not to satisfy the stereotype of the boorish husband, but because he eats a lot of meat and drinks a lot of beer."

Palmer-Mehta notes that Hank's "fervor for selling propane and propane accessories is nearly apostolic." During their development of the character, the show's writers did substantial research on the propane business. Over time, members of the propane industry came to view Hank Hill as a largely positive image.

Ethan Thompson writes that although Hank Hill is similar to other sitcom father figures, such as Archie Bunker from All in the Family, he is different due to his "ability to acknowledge that the values and beliefs he grew up with are no longer sufficient to guide him in his roles as father, husband, friend, and employee."

Much of the humor of the show results from the collision of Hank's mildly conservative manner, nature, and philosophy with the world and people around him. He usually leans towards Republican political candidates, which has included frequent praise of George W. Bush throughout much of the series (despite a brief period of skepticism after Bush gave him a "limp" handshake), After having lived in Dhahran, Saudi Arabia, Hank takes a liking to soccer after having disliked it for many years.

== Reception ==
New York Times contributor Matt Bai discussed Hank's political perspective in 2005, writing, "[L]ike a lot of the basically conservative voters you meet in rural America ... Hank never professes an explicit party loyalty, and he and his buddies who sip beer in the alley don't talk like their fellow Texan Tom DeLay. If Hank votes Republican, it's because, as a voter who cares about religious and rural values, he probably doesn't see much choice. But Hank and his neighbors resemble many independent voters, open to proposals that challenge their assumptions about the world, as long as those ideas don't come from someone who seems to disrespect what they believe."

In 1997, Texas Monthly included Hank Hill on its annual "Texas Twenty" list of "the most impressive, intriguing, and influential Texans". He was the first "non-human" to make the list. An accompanying mock interview described him as "perhaps the most recognized Texan in the world".

Ten years later, Associated Press television critic Frazier Moore described Hank as "more than ever ... a man on the spot, torn between squabbling, widening extremes. . . the man politicians always glorify in campaign speeches, but conveniently forget once they win: the ordinary guy, just trying to get by." Moore opined that Hank "was a remarkable invention 10 years ago" and the fact that the show was "still funny and savvy" a decade later was "even more notable".

== In other media ==
Besides King of the Hill, Hank has made cameos on other shows, either officially or in pop culture, including:

Program	Episode	References	Appearance
The Simpsons	"Bart Star"		Official
The Simpsons	"Missionary: Impossible"		Pop Cultural
The Simpsons	"Marge vs. Singles, Seniors, Childless Couples and Teens, and Gays"		Pop Cultural
The Simpsons	"The Ten-Per-Cent Solution"		Pop Cultural
The Simpsons	"Pretty Whittle Liar"		Pop Cultural
Family Guy	"Petergeist"		Pop Cultural
Family Guy	"Bigfat"		Official
Family Guy	"All About Alana"		Official
The Cleveland Show	"Cleveland Live!"		Official
The Cleveland Show	"Das Shrimp Boot"		Official
South Park	"Cartoon Wars Part II"		Pop Cultural

== See also ==
- List of King of the Hill characters
