= Saladin K. Patterson =

American television producer and writer

- Education: Massachusetts Institute of Technology; Vanderbilt University
- Occupations: Screenwriter; television producer
- Years active: 1997–present

Saladin K. Patterson is an American television writer and producer.

== Early life ==
Patterson, who is of African American heritage, grew up in Montgomery, Alabama and attended Loveless Academic Magnet Program. He studied engineering at Massachusetts Institute of Technology and entered a graduate psychology program at Vanderbilt University.

== Career ==
Patterson left the graduate program at Vanderbilt to accept a "prestigious Disney|ABC Writing Fellowship", which gained him access to career opportunities in film and television. He landed a staff writer position on Teen Angel, and then became a writer for Frasier and for The Bernie Mac Show where he also was co-executive producer.

For seven years, Patterson worked on Psych as a co-executive producer. In 2019, he signed an overall deal with 20th Century Fox Television. He was the developer of and executive producer of The Wonder Years revival, which premiered on ABC in September 2021. He currently serves as the showrunner for the revival of King of the Hill, which premiered in August 2025.
