= Peggy Hill =

Fictional character from the animated series King of the Hill

- King of the Hill character
- Peggy (back) and her son Bobby as they both appear in the first thirteen seasons (1997–2010)
- First appearance: "Pilot" (1997)
- Created by: Mike Judge; Greg Daniels
- Designed by: Mike Judge
- Voiced by: Kathy Najimy

In-universe information
- Aliases: Mrs. Peggy Hill, Sister Peggy, Señora Peggy Hill, Doctor Peggy Hill, Old Jane, Señora Gracia Ibanez, Peg-Leg, Margarita Hill, Mrs. Hank Hill, Miss Peggy, Hank's Wife
- Occupation: Substitute Spanish teacher; real estate agent; housewife; former restaurateur, public notary, occasional modern art sculptor, and journalist
- Family: Doc Platter (father; deceased); Maddy Platter (mother); Hoyt Platter (brother); Luanne Platter (niece); Gracie Margaret Kleinschmidt (great-niece); Laverne (aunt); Boppo (uncle)
- Spouse: Hank Hill (husband)
- Children: Bobby Hill (son)
- Relatives: Tilly Garrison (mother-in-law); Cotton Hill (father-in-law; deceased); Junichiro (half-brother-in-law); G. H. Hill (half-brother-in-law)
- Religion: Christianity (United Methodist denomination)
- Nationality: American

Margaret J. "Peggy" Hill (née Platter) is a fictional character in the Fox animated series King of the Hill, voiced by Kathy Najimy. She is the matriarch of the Hill family and the wife of the series protagonist Hank Hill, mother to Robert Jeffrey "Bobby" Hill, and aunt to Luanne Platter.

== Character analysis ==
Although Peggy is often cited as "the hated wife and mother of adult animated TV" due to her arrogance and character flaws, Austin Jones of Paste argues that she is one of the most complex characters in the series, calling her a "keen satire on the way Southern suburbia mollifies women with talent into embittered sidekick roles to mediocre men". Peggy fancies herself the best at everything. She especially sees herself as a polymath. She is a scholar as well as an athlete. She also sees herself as an artist. When it comes to many of things that she does, she is mediocre at best. But some things she is remarkably skilled at.

According to Jo Johnson, Peggy differs from the usual depiction of women in adult animated sitcoms due to the fact that she is both a mother and homemaker while also being employed. In most other animated sitcoms, such as The Simpsons, regular employment is "bestowed upon male breadwinners or single unattractive females". Johnson argues that Peggy's ability to comfortably juggle her role at home with a career "sets her apart from other animated mothers".

Lara Karaian of Fireweed states that the characters of King of the Hill represent stereotypes of working class southern communities. They describe Peggy as the "liberal feminist of her southern town", and is "someone who stands by her man while still remaining a strong and independent Texas woman", comparing her to Hillary Clinton.

== See also ==
- Bobby Hill
- Hank Hill
- List of King of the Hill characters
