= Pamela Adlon =

American actress (born 1966)

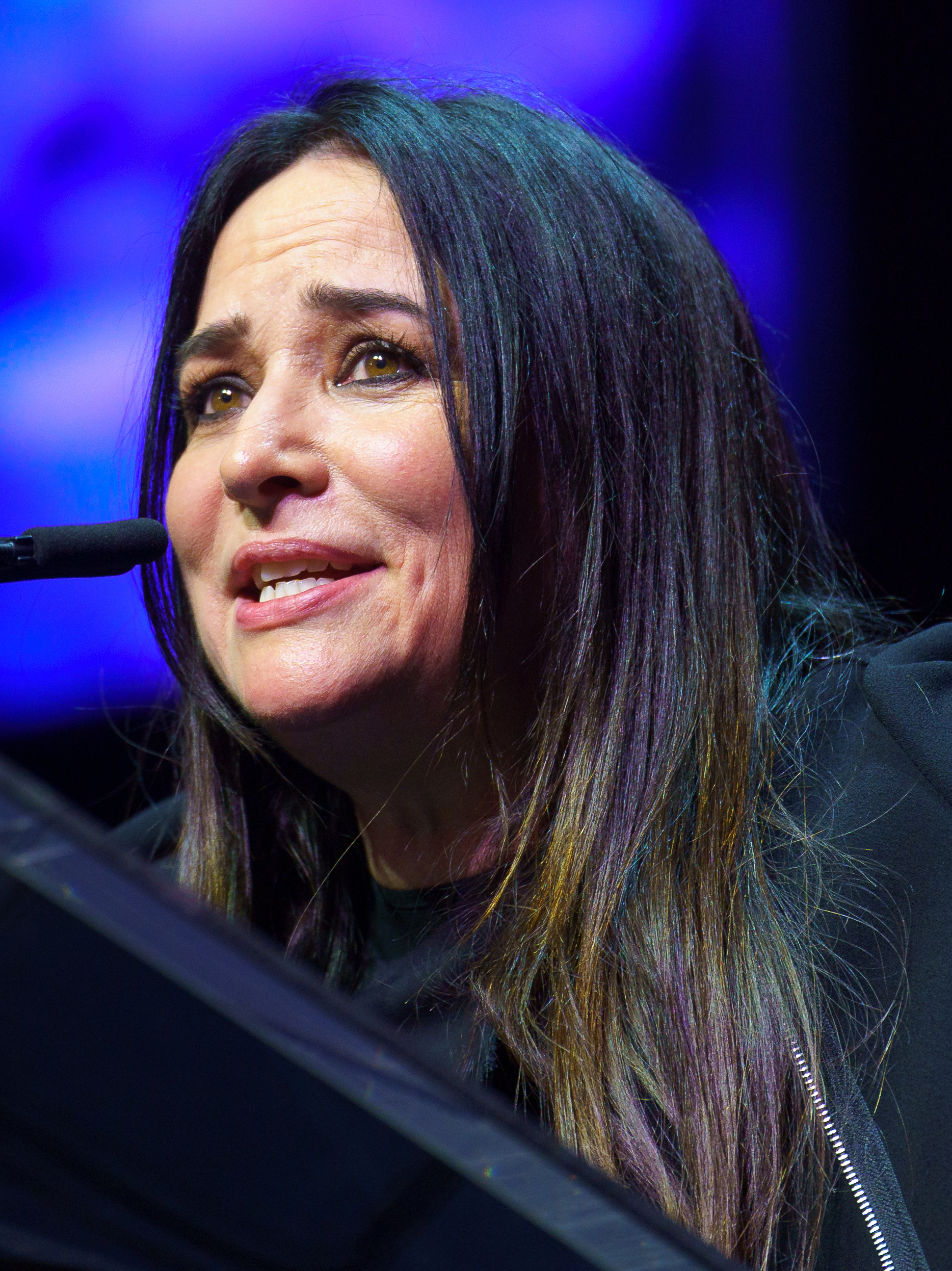
- Adlon at SXSW 2024
- Born: Pamela Segall; July 9, 1966 (age 60); New York City, U.S.
- Citizenship: United States; United Kingdom
- Occupations: Actress; writer; producer; director
- Years active: 1982–present
- Works: Filmography
- Spouse: Felix Adlon (m. 1996; div. 2010)
- Children: 3, including Gideon and Odessa

Pamela Adlon (/ˈædlɒn/ AD-lon; née Segall; born July 9, 1966) is an American actress, writer, and director. She is known for voicing Bobby Hill in the animated comedy series King of the Hill (1997–2010, 2025–present), for which she won a Primetime Emmy Award. She also voiced Baloo in Jungle Cubs (1996–1998), the title role in the Pajama Sam video game series (1996–2001), Lucky in 101 Dalmatians: The Series (1997–1998), Margaret "Moose" Pearson in Pepper Ann (1997–2001), Ashley Spinelli in Recess (1997–2001), Otto Osworth in Time Squad (2001–2003), Vidia in the Tinker Bell franchise and Brigette Murphy in Milo Murphy's Law (2016–2019), among numerous others.

Pamela Adlon is also known for her roles in the comedy-drama series Californication (2007–2014) and Louie (2010–2015), the latter of which she additionally wrote and produced alongside Louis C.K. Her work on Louie garnered her four Primetime Emmy Award nominations. From 2016 to 2022, Pamela Adlon starred as Sam Fox on the acclaimed FX comedy-drama series Better Things, which she also co-created, wrote, produced, and directed. The series won a Peabody Award, and she was nominated twice for a Primetime Emmy Award for Outstanding Lead Actress in a Comedy Series.

She has appeared in numerous films since making her acting debut in Grease 2 (1982). Her subsequent films include Say Anything... (1989), Bed of Roses (1996), Lucky 13 (2005), Conception (2011), First Girl I Loved (2016), I Love You, Daddy (2017), Bumblebee (2018), and The King of Staten Island (2020). Adlon made her feature film directorial debut with the comedy Babes (2024).

== Early life ==
Adlon was born in New York City. She is the daughter of Marina Lucy (née Leece) and Donald Maxwell "Don" Segall, who was a television comedy writer-producer and author of comic books and science fiction pulp novels. Her father produced The Dave Garroway Show, which became AM New York and then The Today Show. He was a page at NBC with Gilbert Cates and wrote erotic fiction under various pseudonyms, including Troy Conway.

Adlon's parents met at a United Service Organizations (USO) event in Paris, France. Her father was born in Boston into a Ukrainian-Jewish family, while her mother was an Englishwoman who was raised Anglican Protestant and converted to Judaism.

As a child, Adlon lived in the Carnegie House at 100 West 57th Street. She has said that she and her family lived bi-coastally, moving between Los Angeles and New York because her father was a journeyman writer and producer for TV. She began performing at age nine; one of her father's friends had a radio studio, so she would do voice-over work there. While in Los Angeles she did TV and film acting work. She attended Sarah Lawrence College for a semester. After moving to Laurel Canyon, Los Angeles, she shared a house with Anna Gunn.

== Career ==
Adlon made her acting debut as Dolores Rebchuck in the 1982 musical sequel film Grease 2. She had a recurring role as Kelly Affinado in the sitcom The Facts of Life (1983–1984). This was followed by appearances in Bad Manners (1984), Night Court (1984), Willy/Milly (1986), Star Trek: The Next Generation (1989), Say Anything... (1989), Sgt. Bilko (1996), and Plump Fiction (1997). Although Adlon was successful as a child actress, she struggled to find acting roles in her 20s. It led her to develop a substantial voice-over career which she cited as saving her career.

Adlon gained further acclaim and recognition for voicing the starring role of Bobby Hill in the animated comedy series King of the Hill (1997–2010), for which she received a Primetime Emmy Award for Outstanding Voice-Over Performance in 2002. Adlon also gained recognition for voicing Margaret "Moose" Pearson in Pepper Ann (1997–2000), Ashley Spinelli in Recess (1997–2001), Brigette Murphy in Milo Murphy's Law (2016–2019), and the voice of newborn Halley Wolowitz in The Big Bang Theory.

Adlon is recognizable for her husky voice, which led to her voicing young boys in numerous animated series and films. She voiced Baloo in Jungle Cubs (1996–1998), the title role in the video game series Pajama Sam (1996–2001), Lucky in 101 Dalmatians: The Series (1997–1998), Hector McBadger in Jakers! The Adventures of Piggley Winks (2003–2007), and Andy in Squirrel Boy (2006–2007), among numerous others. She was nominated for an Annie Award for her role as Otto Osworth in the Cartoon Network animated comedy series Time Squad (2001–2003). She continued to voice characters in films, such as The Animatrix (2003) and as Vidia in the Tinker Bell film series (2008–2015).

Adlon had notable live-action roles as Emma Path in the ABC legal drama series Boston Legal (2007–2008), Marcy Runkle in the Showtime comedy-drama series Californication (2007–2014), and as Pamela in the FX comedy series Louie (2010–2015). She was also a writer and consulting producer for the lattermost series.

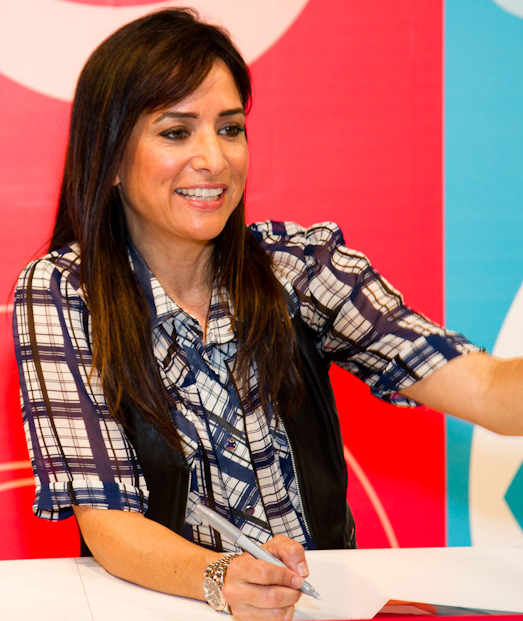
Adlon at San Diego Comic-Con in 2011

Adlon's professional relationship with Louis C.K. began in 2006 when she played his wife in the short-lived HBO sitcom Lucky Louie. She appeared as the friend of Louie (a fictional character based on C.K.) in his FX single-camera series Louie. She appeared in every season but the third. Adlon co-wrote seven episodes of the series and became a consulting producer. She earned a total of four Primetime Emmy Award nominations for her work on Louie. She earned two nominations as a producer for Outstanding Comedy Series, one nomination for Outstanding Writing for a Comedy Series for co-writing the episode "Daddy's Girlfriend Part 1", and one nomination for Outstanding Guest Actress in a Comedy Series.

In 2015, FX gave a pilot order to Better Things, a comedy created by and starring Adlon. She plays an actress raising three daughters. The pilot was written by Adlon and Louis C.K., who also directed it. It was picked up for a 10-episode series on August 7, 2015. The show, which premiered on September 8, 2016, is semi-autobiographical. C.K. served as a co-writer and occasional director for the first two seasons, while Adlon has served as director and writer throughout the series' run.

The series received widespread critical acclaim and was honored with a Peabody Award. Adlon received a Primetime Emmy Award nomination for Outstanding Lead Actress in a Comedy Series for the first two seasons of Better Things. She also received a nomination for the Golden Globe Award for Best Actress – Television Series Musical or Comedy, and four nominations for the TCA Award for Individual Achievement in Comedy. Adlon was represented by manager Dave Becky until November 2017, when she fired him following his involvement in the Louis C.K. sexual harassment scandal.

Adlon had recent live-action roles in the romantic drama film First Girl I Loved (2016), the science fiction action film Bumblebee (2018), and the comedy-drama film The King of Staten Island (2020). She had a guest role as Mrs. Wolowitz in the CBS sitcom Young Sheldon (2017) and a recurring role as Dr. Leigh in the acclaimed NBC drama series This Is Us (2020). She guest starred on the ABC sitcom Shifting Gears (2025) in the Season 2 episode "Nutcracker".

Adlon made her feature directorial debut with Babes in 2024.

She signed with United Talent Agency in May 2026.

== Personal life ==
In 1996, Adlon married Felix Adlon, the son of German director Percy Adlon. Felix Adlon directed Pamela in Eat Your Heart Out (1997). They divorced in 2010, and he then moved to Germany. They have three daughters who are actresses, including Gideon and Odessa.

Adlon splits her time between the Upper West Side of Manhattan and Los Angeles.

In January 2020, Adlon became a citizen of the United Kingdom.

== Filmography ==
Adlon is known for her collaborations with Louis C.K and her performances in Lucky Louie (2006), Louie (2010–2015), and Better Things (2016–2022). She has had major performances in The Facts of Life (1983–1984) and Californication (2007–2014) as well as making guest appearances in The Jeffersons (1984), Boston Legal (2007–2008), Parenthood (2012), and This Is Us (2020). In 2025 she began a recurring role as Nathan Lane's sister on Hulu's Mid-Century Modern. She is also a well known voice artist. Her voice credits include the animated programs Kiki's Delivery Service (1989), Bobby's World (1992–1998), Rugrats (1992–2004), Recess (1997–2001), King of the Hill (1997–2010, 2025–present), The Oblongs (2001), Bob's Burgers (2012–2020), and Babes (2024).

== Awards and nominations ==
Year	Award	Category	Work	Result	Ref.
2025	Children's and Family Emmy Awards	Outstanding Voice Performer in a Preschool Program	SuperKitties (episode: "Bossy Birdy")	Nominated	
2018	Golden Globe Awards	Best Actress – Television Series Musical or Comedy	Better Things	Nominated	
2016	Peabody Awards	Area of Excellence	Better Things	Won	
2002	Primetime Emmy Awards	Outstanding Voice-Over Performance	King of the Hill (episode: "Bobby Goes Nuts")	Won	
2013	Primetime Emmy Awards	Outstanding Writing for a Comedy Series: Daddy's Girlfriend: Part 1	Louie	Nominated	
2014	Primetime Emmy Awards	Outstanding Comedy Series	Louie	Nominated	
2015	Primetime Emmy Awards	Outstanding Comedy Series	Louie	Nominated	
2015	Primetime Emmy Awards	Outstanding Guest Actress in a Comedy Series	Louie	Nominated	
2017	Primetime Emmy Awards	Outstanding Lead Actress in a Comedy Series	Better Things	Nominated	
2018	Primetime Emmy Awards	Outstanding Lead Actress in a Comedy Series	Better Things	Nominated	
2026	Primetime Emmy Awards	Outstanding Character Voice-Over Performance	King of the Hill (episode: "Any Given Hill-day")	Nominated	
2015	Producers Guild of America Awards	Outstanding Producers of Episodic Television	Louie	Nominated	
2017	Television Critics Association Awards	Individual Achievement in Comedy	Better Things	Nominated	
2018	Television Critics Association Awards	Individual Achievement in Comedy	Better Things	Nominated	
2019	Television Critics Association Awards	Individual Achievement in Comedy	Better Things	Nominated	
2020	Television Critics Association Awards	Individual Achievement in Comedy	Better Things	Nominated	
2022	Television Critics Association Awards	Individual Achievement in Comedy	Better Things	Nominated	
2012	Writers Guild of America Awards	Best Comedy Series	Louie	Nominated	
2013	Writers Guild of America Awards	Best Comedy Series	Louie	Won	
2015	Writers Guild of America Awards	Best Comedy Series	Louie	Won	
2017	Writers Guild of America Awards	Best New Series	Better Things	Nominated	
