= Bobby Hill (King of the Hill) =

King of the Hill character

- King of the Hill character
- Bobby (front) with his mother Peggy as they both appear in the first thirteen seasons (1997–2010)
- First appearance: "Pilot" (1997)
- Created by: Mike Judge; Greg Daniels
- Designed by: Mike Judge
- Voiced by: Pamela Adlon

In-universe information
- Nicknames: Bing Bing (by Cotton Hill); Booby (by Chane Wassanasong); Lama Sanglug; Kidney Boy; Fat White Lump (by Kahn Souphanousinphone); Tartuffe the Spry Winderdög
- Gender: Male
- Family: Hank Hill (father); Peggy Hill (mother)
- Relatives: Tilly Garrison (paternal grandmother); Cotton Hill (paternal grandfather, deceased); Didi Hill (paternal step-grandmother); Doc Platter (maternal grandfather, deceased); Maddy Platter (maternal grandmother); Hoyt Platter (uncle); Leanne Platter (aunt); Elroy "Lucky" Kleinschmidt (cousin in-law); Gracie Kleinschmidt (first cousin once removed); G.H. (Good Hank) Hill (uncle); Junichiro (uncle); Luanne Platter (cousin)
- Nationality: American

Robert Jeffrey "Bobby" Hill is a fictional character on the Fox/Hulu animated series King of the Hill and is voiced by Pamela Adlon. Bobby is the only child of Hank and Peggy Hill.

== Character biography ==
Robert Jeffrey "Bobby" Hill was born on August 13 in Arlen, Texas, as revealed in "Shins of the Father". Bobby is 4'11" (150 cm), below average height for his age, and is also overweight. Bobby is a school-aged boy who enjoys comedy, music, dance and socializing with his friends, Joseph Gribble and Connie Souphanousinphone. Although at times Bobby is seen as odd by his father and peers, he maintains a remarkable talent with people, particularly with girls, who find him cute and entertaining. Despite both of his parents being athletes, Bobby is inept at sports; nor does he show any interest in them as a spectator. He is innocent, gentle, amicable, and good-natured. Though sometimes seen as a let-down, he does have a number of talents. Using these talents, Bobby aspires to be a prop comic like his comedic hero "Celery Head" (a parody of Carrot Top) and a "ladies' man" (at times). Bobby displays a natural talent as a marksman, shown in "How to Fire a Rifle Without Really Trying" and "To Kill a Ladybird". Bobby is generally very passive and is occasionally a victim of bullies, but maintains an overall high level of self-esteem. He is also the only person to whom Cotton Hill ever expresses genuine and unconditional affection, consistently supporting him and confiding in him throughout the series.

Bobby's age progresses throughout the series. He starts out aged 11, turns 12 in "Shins of the Father", turns 13 in "I Don't Want To Wait For Our Lives To Be Over", and is aged 13 for the rest of the series pre-revival In the 2025 revival, Bobby is 21, now working in Dallas as the head chef of a Japanese-German fusion restaurant.

== Character analysis ==
=== Portrayal of children with ADHD ===
In their book Abnormal Child Psychology, authors Eric J. Mash and David Allen Wolfe discussed the misconception that eating sugar contributes to ADD. Certain media portrayals, including the events surrounding Bobby in the episode "Peggy's Turtle Song", are noted.

=== Contrast to Bart Simpson ===
In the book People of the Century by CBS News, they described Bobby as the "anti-Bart" (referring to Bart Simpson) while discussing how other characters have tried to "claim Bart's place of honor."

=== Relationships ===
Many episodes focus on the development of the relationship between Bobby and Hank. Bobby is not talented as an athlete or a craftsman like his father is, although he shows signs of being a talented golfer and shooter. As a result, Hank doubts his masculine identity and normalcy, tacitly and with side-of-the-mouth remarks, often lamenting "That boy ain't right." Apparently outside of Hank's knowledge, Bobby does have the capability of physical anger, as when he twice punched the taller and stronger Joseph for kissing Connie. Bobby is saddened by his father's lack of appreciation for the arts and his comedy routines. The two struggle to find common interests. However, Hank and Bobby find common interests in Texas, meat, propane, target shooting, hunting and golfing, among other things as the show progresses. Over time, Hank is far less prone to express the idea that "that boy ain't right", and despite differences, Hank and Bobby have a close relationship. Bobby considers his father his hero. Although Bobby has a savant knack with shooting, it is one particular talent Hank does not have.

Writer Norm Hiscock told MEL Magazine that "Bobby was a sensitive boy who was open to things, whereas Hank was more close-minded, so Bobby would drive him crazy. It was always a nice mash-up. That, for me, was the heart of King of the Hill."

== Reception and legacy ==
The London Free Press states that he "arguably was the most interesting, complex and in some ways 'real' kid in TV."

Voice actress Pamela Adlon received positive reception for her portrayal of Bobby. She received an Emmy for her role in the episode "Bobby Goes Nuts", the only performer in the series to have won one for their role. IGN editor Talmadge Blevins quotes a line spoken by Bobby, "That's my purse! I don't know you!", describing it as one of the "most memorable lines ever uttered on television."

In 2002, TV Guide ranked Bobby Hill number 48 on its "50 Greatest Cartoon Characters of All Time" list.

== See also ==
- Hank Hill
- Peggy Hill
- List of King of the Hill characters
