= List of Bob's Burgers episodes =

Bob's Burgers is an American animated television sitcom created by Loren Bouchard for the Fox Broadcasting Company. The series centers on the Belcher family, consisting of parents Bob (H. Jon Benjamin) and Linda (John Roberts) and their children Tina (Dan Mintz), Gene (Eugene Mirman) and Louise (Kristen Schaal), who run a hamburger restaurant. Bob's Burgers was conceived by Bouchard after he developed Home Movies. Bob's Burgers is a production by Bento Box Entertainment and 20th Television Animation. The show is said to fill the void created by the conclusion of King of the Hill, which executive producer Jim Dauterive worked on for nearly its entire run.

A total of 313 episodes have been broadcast. All episodes are approximately 22 minutes without commercials, and are broadcast in both high-definition and standard. The series' episodes are also available for download at the iTunes Store in standard and high-definition qualities, and Amazon Video, with new episodes appearing the day after their live airing. Fox Video on Demand also releases episodes of the show, typically one to two days after their original airing. It can also be found on Hulu, with episodes available the day after their broadcast.

The first season was released on DVD on April 17, 2012, in Region 1 by 20th Century Fox Home Entertainment. Bob's Burgers' first season averaged 5.07 million viewers in the 2010–11 television season, with the season's first episode, "Human Flesh", being the highest-rated new series premiere of the television season. The second season of Bob's Burgers averaged 4.18 million viewers, as part of the 2011–12 television season and the third season consisted of an average of 4.11 million views per episode in the 2012–13 television season. While season 1 received mostly mixed reviews, since season 2, Bob's Burgers has received positive reviews from critics.

On April 2, 2025, it was announced that Bob's Burgers would be renewed for four more seasons in what is considered a "mega deal" with producers 20th Television Animation (a unit of Disney). This renewal will take the show through the 2028–29 television season.

== Series overview ==
Season	Episodes	Originally released	
Season	Episodes	First released	Last released
1	13	January 9, 2011	May 22, 2011
2	9	March 11, 2012	May 20, 2012
3	23	September 30, 2012	May 12, 2013
4	22	September 29, 2013	May 18, 2014
5	21	October 5, 2014	May 17, 2015
6	19	September 27, 2015	May 22, 2016
7	22	September 25, 2016	June 11, 2017
8	21	October 1, 2017	May 20, 2018
9	22	September 30, 2018	May 12, 2019
10	22	September 29, 2019	May 17, 2020
11	22	September 27, 2020	May 23, 2021
12	22	September 26, 2021	May 22, 2022
13	22	September 25, 2022	May 21, 2023
14	16	October 1, 2023	September 22, 2024
15	22	September 29, 2024	August 14, 2025
16	15	September 28, 2025	May 17, 2026

== Episodes ==
=== Season 1 (2011) ===
No. overall	No. in season	Title	Directed by	Written by	Original release date	Prod. code	U.S. viewers (millions)
1	1	"Human Flesh"	Anthony Chun	Loren Bouchard & Jim Dauterive	January 9, 2011	1ASA01	9.38
2	2	"Crawl Space"	Kyounghee Lim	Loren Bouchard & Jim Dauterive	January 16, 2011	1ASA02	5.07
3	3	"Sacred Cow"	Jennifer Coyle	Nora Smith	January 23, 2011	1ASA04	4.81
4	4	"Sexy Dance Fighting"	Anthony Chun	Steven Davis & Kelvin Yu	February 13, 2011	1ASA06	4.19
5	5	"Hamburger Dinner Theater"	Wes Archer	Dan Fybel & Rich Rinaldi	February 20, 2011	1ASA05	4.87
6	6	"Sheesh! Cab, Bob?"	Jennifer Coyle	Jon Schroeder	March 6, 2011	1ASA09	4.91
7	7	"Bed & Breakfast"	Boohwan Lim	Holly Schlesinger	March 13, 2011	1ASA08	4.10
8	8	"Art Crawl"	Kyounghee Lim	Lizzie Molyneux & Wendy Molyneux	March 20, 2011	1ASA07	4.43
9	9	"Spaghetti Western and Meatballs"	Wes Archer	Kit Boss	March 27, 2011	1ASA10	4.65
10	10	"Burger War"	Boohwan Lim	Loren Bouchard	April 10, 2011	1ASA03	4.00
11	11	"Weekend at Mort's"	Anthony Chun	Scott Jacobson	May 8, 2011	1ASA11	4.26
12	12	"Lobsterfest"	Boohwan Lim	Aron Abrams & Greg Thompson	May 15, 2011	1ASA13	4.68
13	13	"Torpedo"	Kyounghee Lim	Dan Fybel & Rich Rinaldi	May 22, 2011	1ASA12	4.31

=== Season 2 (2012) ===
No. overall	No. in season	Title	Directed by	Written by	Original release date	Prod. code	U.S. viewers (millions)
14	1	"The Belchies"	Boohwan Lim & Kyounghee Lim	Jon Schroeder	March 11, 2012	2ASA01	4.04
15	2	"Bob Day Afternoon"	Wes Archer	Dan Fybel & Rich Rinaldi	March 18, 2012	2ASA02	4.40
16	3	"Synchronized Swimming"	Anthony Chun	Holly Schlesinger	March 25, 2012	2ASA03	3.97
17	4	"Burgerboss"	Jennifer Coyle	Scott Jacobson	April 1, 2012	2ASA04	3.66
18	5	"Food Truckin'"	Bernard Derriman	Lizzie Molyneux & Wendy Molyneux	April 15, 2012	2ASA05	3.90
19	6	"Dr. Yap"	Anthony Chun	Steven Davis & Kelvin Yu	April 29, 2012	2ASA07	3.92
20	7	"Moody Foodie"	Boohwan Lim & Kyounghee Lim	Steven Davis & Kelvin Yu	May 6, 2012	2ASA06	3.72
21	8	"Bad Tina"	Jennifer Coyle	Holly Schlesinger	May 13, 2012	2ASA10	3.69
22	9	"Beefsquatch"	Wes Archer	Nora Smith	May 20, 2012	2ASA09	3.57

=== Season 3 (2012–13) ===
No. overall	No. in season	Title	Directed by	Written by	Original release date	Prod. code	U.S. viewers (millions)
23	1	"Ear-sy Rider"	Anthony Chun	Dan Fybel & Rich Rinaldi	September 30, 2012	2ASA13	5.46
24	2	"Full Bars"	Boohwan Lim & Kyounghee Lim	Steven Davis & Kelvin Yu	October 7, 2012	2ASA17	4.89
25	3	"Bob Fires the Kids"	Boohwan Lim & Kyounghee Lim	Lizzie Molyneux & Wendy Molyneux	November 4, 2012	2ASA12	3.92
26	4	"Mutiny on the Windbreaker"	John Rice	Kit Boss	November 11, 2012	2ASA08	4.89
27	5	"An Indecent Thanksgiving Proposal"	Tyree Dillihay	Lizzie Molyneux & Wendy Molyneux	November 18, 2012	2ASA19	3.94
28	6	"The Deepening"	Bernard Derriman	Greg Thompson	November 25, 2012	2ASA11	4.66
29	7	"Tinarannosaurus Wrecks"	Wes Archer	Jon Schroeder	December 2, 2012	2ASA14	3.97
30	8	"The Unbearable Like-Likeness of Gene"	Don MacKinnon	Holly Schlesinger	December 9, 2012	2ASA16	4.55
31	9	"God Rest Ye Merry Gentle-Mannequins"	Anthony Chun	Kit Boss	December 16, 2012	2ASA18	3.09
32	10	"Mother Daughter Laser Razor"	Jennifer Coyle	Nora Smith	January 6, 2013	2ASA15	6.40
33	11	"Nude Beach"	Wes Archer	Scott Jacobson	January 13, 2013	2ASA20	4.44
34	12	"Broadcast Wagstaff School News"	Jennifer Coyle	Greg Thompson	January 27, 2013	2ASA21	4.12
35	13	"My Fuzzy Valentine"	Boohwan Lim & Kyounghee Lim	Dan Fybel & Rich Rinaldi	February 10, 2013	3ASA01	3.45
36	14	"Lindapendent Woman"	Don MacKinnon	Mike Benner	February 17, 2013	2ASA22	3.93
37	15	"O.T.: The Outside Toilet"	Anthony Chun	Lizzie Molyneux & Wendy Molyneux	March 3, 2013	3ASA02	3.67
38	16	"Topsy"	Tyree Dillihay	Loren Bouchard & Nora Smith	March 10, 2013	3ASA03	3.85
39	17	"Two for Tina"	Wes Archer	Scott Jacobson	March 17, 2013	3ASA04	3.62
40	18	"It Snakes a Village"	Jennifer Coyle	Kit Boss	March 24, 2013	3ASA05	3.76
41	19	"Family Fracas"	Don MacKinnon	Holly Schlesinger	April 14, 2013	3ASA06	3.45
42	20	"The Kids Run the Restaurant"	Boohwan Lim & Kyounghee Lim	Steven Davis & Kelvin Yu	April 21, 2013	3ASA07	3.74
43	21	"Boyz 4 Now"	Anthony Chun	Lizzie Molyneux & Wendy Molyneux	April 28, 2013	3ASA08	3.50
44	22	"Carpe Museum"	Tyree Dillihay	Jon Schroeder	May 5, 2013	3ASA09	3.96
45	23	"The Unnatural"	Wes Archer	Greg Thompson	May 12, 2013	3ASA10	3.38

=== Season 4 (2013–14) ===
No. overall	No. in season	Title	Directed by	Written by	Original release date	Prod. code	U.S. viewers (millions)
46	1	"A River Runs Through Bob"	Jennifer Coyle	Dan Fybel & Rich Rinaldi	September 29, 2013	3ASA11	4.48
47	2	"Fort Night"	Boohwan Lim & Kyounghee Lim	Mike Olsen	October 6, 2013	3ASA13	4.21
48	3	"Seaplane!"	Jennifer Coyle	Dan Fybel & Rich Rinaldi	November 3, 2013	3ASA14	3.75
49	4	"My Big Fat Greek Bob"	Don MacKinnon	Scott Jacobson	November 10, 2013	3ASA12	3.17
50	5	"Turkey in a Can"	Boohwan Lim & Kyounghee Lim	Lizzie Molyneux & Wendy Molyneux	November 24, 2013	3ASA16	4.08
51	6	"Purple Rain-Union"	Tyree Dillihay	Loren Bouchard & Nora Smith	December 1, 2013	3ASA15	3.39
52	7	"Bob and Deliver"	Don MacKinnon	Greg Thompson	December 8, 2013	3ASA18	4.60
53	8	"Christmas in the Car"	Bernard Derriman & Jennifer Coyle	Steven Davis & Kelvin Yu	December 15, 2013	3ASA17	5.57
54	9	"Slumber Party"	Jennifer Coyle	Scott Jacobson	January 5, 2014	3ASA21	6.35
55	10	"Presto Tina-o"	Chris Song	Kit Boss	January 12, 2014	3ASA20	4.20
56	11	"Easy Com-mercial, Easy Go-mercial"	Tyree Dillihay	Jon Schroeder	January 26, 2014	3ASA19	3.24
57	12	"The Frond Files"	Jennifer Coyle	Lizzie Molyneux & Wendy Molyneux	March 9, 2014	4ASA04	2.21
58	13	"Mazel-Tina"	Brian Loschiavo	Holly Schlesinger	March 16, 2014	4ASA03	2.44
59	14	"Uncle Teddy"	Don MacKinnon	Dan Fybel & Rich Rinaldi	March 23, 2014	3ASA22	2.45
60	15	"The Kids Rob a Train"	Boohwan Lim & Kyounghee Lim	Steven Davis & Kelvin Yu	March 30, 2014	4ASA01	2.26
61	16	"I Get Psy-chic Out of You"	Chris Song	Jon Schroeder	April 6, 2014	4ASA02	2.27
62	17	"The Equestranauts"	Tyree Dillihay	Dan Mintz	April 13, 2014	4ASA05	1.83
63	18	"Ambergris"	Don MacKinnon	Scott Jacobson	April 20, 2014	4ASA06	1.52
64	19	"The Kids Run Away"	Boohwan Lim & Kyounghee Lim	Rich Rinaldi	April 27, 2014	4ASA07	2.26
65	20	"Gene It On"	Chris Song	Greg Thompson	May 4, 2014	4ASA08	2.23
66	21	"Wharf Horse (or How Bob Saves/Destroys the Town – Part I)"	Brian Loschiavo	Nora Smith	May 11, 2014	4ASA09	1.97
67	22	"World Wharf II: The Wharfening (or How Bob Saves/Destroys the Town – Part II)"	Jennifer Coyle	Lizzie Molyneux & Wendy Molyneux	May 18, 2014	4ASA10	1.95

=== Season 5 (2014–15) ===
No. overall	No. in season	Title	Directed by	Written by	Original release date	Prod. code	U.S. viewers (millions)
68	1	"Work Hard or Die Trying, Girl"	Jennifer Coyle	Nora Smith	October 5, 2014	4ASA14	3.14
69	2	"Tina and the Real Ghost"	Boohwan Lim & Kyounghee Lim	Steven Davis & Kelvin Yu	November 2, 2014	4ASA13	2.89
70	3	"Friends with Burger-fits"	Tyree Dillihay	Dan Fybel	November 16, 2014	4ASA11	3.35
71	4	"Dawn of the Peck"	Tyree Dillihay	Lizzie Molyneux & Wendy Molyneux	November 23, 2014	4ASA16	1.90
72	5	"Best Burger"	Don MacKinnon	Mike Benner	November 30, 2014	4ASA12	2.23
73	6	"Father of the Bob"	Chris Song	Steven Davis & Kelvin Yu	December 7, 2014	4ASA18	3.18
74	7	"Tina Tailor Soldier Spy"	Don MacKinnon	Holly Schlesinger	December 14, 2014	4ASA15	2.54
75	8	"Midday Run"	Ian Hamilton	Scott Jacobson	January 4, 2015	4ASA17	3.95
76	9	"Speakeasy Rider"	Jennifer Coyle	Rich Rinaldi	January 11, 2015	4ASA20	3.34
77	10	"Late Afternoon in the Garden of Bob and Louise"	Boohwan Lim & Kyounghee Lim	Jon Schroeder	January 25, 2015	4ASA19	2.49
78	11	"Can't Buy Me Math"	Tyree Dillihay	Dan Fybel	February 8, 2015	4ASA22	1.94
79	12	"The Millie-churian Candidate"	Don MacKinnon	Greg Thompson	February 15, 2015	4ASA21	2.01
80	13	"The Gayle Tales"	Ian Hamilton	Lizzie Molyneux & Wendy Molyneux	March 1, 2015	5ASA01	3.03
81	14	"L'il Hard Dad"	Chris Song	Nora Smith	March 8, 2015	5ASA02	2.56
82	15	"Adventures in Chinchilla-sitting"	Cecilia Aranovich	Mike Benner	March 15, 2015	5ASA03	2.24
83	16	"The Runway Club"	Jennifer Coyle	Steven Davis & Kelvin Yu	March 22, 2015	5ASA04	2.21
84	17	"Itty Bitty Ditty Committee"	Bernard Derriman	Holly Schlesinger	April 26, 2015	5ASA05	2.04
85	18	"Eat, Spray, Linda"	Tyree Dillihay	Jon Schroeder	May 3, 2015	5ASA06	2.24
86	19	"Housetrap"	Jennifer Coyle & Bernard Derriman	Dan Fybel	May 10, 2015	5ASA07	2.47
87	20	"Hawk & Chick"	Tyree Dillihay	Rich Rinaldi	May 17, 2015	5ASA09	1.95
88	21	"The Oeder Games"	Don MacKinnon	Scott Jacobson	May 17, 2015	5ASA08	2.44

=== Season 6 (2015–16) ===
No. overall	No. in season	Title	Directed by	Written by	Original release date	Prod. code	U.S. viewers (millions)
89	1	"Sliding Bobs"	Don MacKinnon	Greg Thompson	September 27, 2015	5ASA10	2.51
90	2	"The Land Ship"	Jennifer Coyle	Holly Schlesinger & H. Jon Benjamin	October 11, 2015	5ASA11	2.19
91	3	"The Hauntening"	Jennifer Coyle	Steven Davis & Kelvin Yu	October 18, 2015	5ASA13	2.09
92	4	"Gayle Makin' Bob Sled"	Tyree Dillihay	Lizzie Molyneux & Wendy Molyneux	November 8, 2015	5ASA17	3.13
93	5	"Nice-Capades"	Chris Song	Dan Fybel	November 15, 2015	5ASA18	2.27
94	6	"The Cook, the Steve, the Gayle, & Her Lover"	Tyree Dillihay	Nora Smith	January 17, 2016	5ASA12	2.26
95	7	"The Gene and Courtney Show"	Chris Song	Rich Rinaldi	February 14, 2016	6ASA01	2.05
96	8	"Sexy Dance Healing"	Chris Song & Bernard Derriman	Rich Rinaldi	February 21, 2016	5ASA15	2.29
97	9	"Sacred Couch"	Brian Loschiavo	Scott Jacobson	March 6, 2016	5ASA16	2.64
98	10	"Lice Things Are Lice"	Brian Loschiavo	Greg Thompson	March 13, 2016	5ASA19	2.28
99	11	"House of 1000 Bounces"	Tyree Dillihay	Mike Benner	April 3, 2016	5ASA20	2.05
100	12	"Stand by Gene"	Tyree Dillihay	Jon Schroeder	April 3, 2016	5ASA14	1.99
101	13	"Wag the Hog"	Brian Loschiavo	Holly Schlesinger	April 10, 2016	5ASA22	2.35
102	14	"The Hormone-iums"	Chris Song	Lizzie Molyneux & Wendy Molyneux	April 17, 2016	6ASA04	2.18
103	15	"Pro Tiki/Con Tiki"	Brian Loschiavo	Jon Schroeder	April 24, 2016	6ASA03	2.35
104	16	"Bye Bye Boo Boo"	Tyree Dillihay	Scott Jacobson	May 8, 2016	6ASA05	2.31
105	17	"The Horse Rider-er"	Tyree Dillihay	Nora Smith	May 15, 2016	6ASA02	2.27
106	18	"Secret Admiral-irer"	Brian Loschiavo	Holly Schlesinger & H. Jon Benjamin	May 22, 2016	6ASA06	2.23
107	19	"Glued, Where's My Bob?"	Bernard Derriman	Steven Davis & Kelvin Yu	May 22, 2016	5ASA21	2.04

=== Season 7 (2016–17) ===
No. overall	No. in season	Title	Directed by	Written by	Original release date	Prod. code	U.S. viewers (millions)
108	1	"Flu-ouise"	Tyree Dillihay	Nora Smith	September 25, 2016	6ASA11	2.60
109	2	"Sea Me Now"	Chris Song	Dan Fybel	October 9, 2016	6ASA07	2.79
110	3	"Teen-a Witch"	Chris Song	Holly Schlesinger	October 23, 2016	6ASA13	3.01
111	4	"They Serve Horses, Don't They?"	Tyree Dillihay	Steven Davis & Kelvin Yu	November 6, 2016	6ASA08	2.42
112	5	"Large Brother, Where Fart Thou?"	Chris Song	Lizzie Molyneux & Wendy Molyneux	November 20, 2016	6ASA10	2.35
113	6	"The Quirkducers"	Mauricio Pardo	Steven Davis & Kelvin Yu	November 20, 2016	6ASA16	2.46
114	7	"The Last Gingerbread House on the Left"	Chris Song	Nora Smith	November 27, 2016	6ASA18	2.44
115	8	"Ex Mach Tina"	Brian Loschiavo	Greg Thompson	January 8, 2017	6ASA09	3.58
116	9	"Bob Actually"	Chris Song	Steven Davis & Kelvin Yu	February 12, 2017	6ASA22	1.67
117	10	"There's No Business Like Mr. Business Business"	Tyree Dillihay	Lizzie Molyneux & Wendy Molyneux	February 19, 2017	6ASA15	1.97
118	11	"A Few 'Gurt Men"	Tyree Dillihay	Jon Schroeder	March 5, 2017	6ASA19	1.77
119	12	"Like Gene for Chocolate"	Brian Loschiavo	Rich Rinaldi	March 12, 2017	6ASA12	1.82
120	13	"The Grand Mama-pest Hotel"	Chris Song	Scott Jacobson	March 19, 2017	6ASA14	1.93
121	14	"Aquaticism"	Brian Loschiavo	Dan Fybel	March 26, 2017	6ASA17	1.86
122	15	"Ain't Miss Debatin'"	Mauricio Pardo	Greg Thompson	March 26, 2017	6ASA20	1.86
123	16	"Eggs for Days"	Brian Loschiavo	Lizzie Molyneux & Wendy Molyneux	April 2, 2017	6ASA21	1.52
124	17	"Zero Larp Thirty"	Tyree Dillihay	Rich Rinaldi	April 23, 2017	7ASA01	1.58
125	18	"The Laser-inth"	Mauricio Pardo	Scott Jacobson	April 23, 2017	7ASA02	1.88
126	19	"Thelma & Louise Except Thelma is Linda"	Brian Loschiavo	Jon Schroeder	April 30, 2017	7ASA03	1.59
127	20	"Mom, Lies, and Videotapes"	Chris Song	Dan Fybel	May 7, 2017	7ASA04	2.02
128	21	"Paraders of the Lost Float"	Bernard Derriman	Steven Davis	May 21, 2017	7ASA05	1.61
129	22	"Into the Mild"	Tyree Dillihay	Kelvin Yu	June 11, 2017	7ASA06	1.52

=== Season 8 (2017–18) ===
No. overall	No. in season	Title	Directed by	Written by	Original release date	Prod. code	U.S. viewers (millions)
130	1	"Brunchsquatch"	Mauricio Pardo & Ian Hamilton	Lizzie Molyneux & Wendy Molyneux	October 1, 2017	7ASA14	2.93
131	2	"The Silence of the Louise"	Chris Song	Greg Thompson	October 15, 2017	7ASA09	2.43
132	3	"The Wolf of Wharf Street"	Mauricio Pardo	Lizzie Molyneux & Wendy Molyneux	October 22, 2017	7ASA07	3.02
133	4	"Sit Me Baby One More Time"	Brian Loschiavo	Nora Smith	November 5, 2017	7ASA08	2.89
134	5	"Thanks-hoarding"	Tyree Dillihay	Jon Schroeder	November 19, 2017	7ASA15	2.37
135	6	"The Bleakening"	Brian Loschiavo	Steven Davis	December 10, 2017	7ASA16	3.17
136	7	"The Bleakening"	Chris Song	Kelvin Yu	December 10, 2017	7ASA17	3.17
137	8	"V for Valentine-detta"	Ian Hamilton	Lizzie Molyneux & Wendy Molyneux	January 14, 2018	7ASA22	4.76
138	9	"Y Tu Ga-Ga Tambien"	Brian Loschiavo	Scott Jacobson	March 11, 2018	7ASA12	1.84
139	10	"The Secret Ceramics Room of Secrets"	Tyree Dillihay	Dan Fybel	March 18, 2018	7ASA19	1.72
140	11	"Sleeping with the Frenemy"	Brian Loschiavo	Greg Thompson	March 25, 2018	7ASA20	1.74
141	12	"The Hurt Soccer"	Damon Wong	Rachel Hastings	April 1, 2018	7ASA23	1.54
142	13	"Cheer Up, Sleepy Gene"	Tyree Dillihay	Teleplay by : Holly Schlesinger; Story by : H. Jon Benjamin & Holly Schlesinger	April 8, 2018	7ASA10	1.74
143	14	"The Trouble with Doubles"	Ian Hamilton	Holly Schlesinger	April 15, 2018	7ASA18	1.83
144	15	"Go Tina on the Mountain"	Tyree Dillihay	Rich Rinaldi	April 22, 2018	8ASA01	1.66
145	16	"Are You There Bob? It's Me, Birthday"	Tyree Dillihay	Kelvin Yu	April 29, 2018	8ASA04	1.91
146	17	"Boywatch"	Mauricio Pardo	Rich Rinaldi	May 6, 2018	7ASA11	1.56
147	18	"As I Walk Through the Alley of the Shadow of Ramps"	Chris Song	Scott Jacobson	May 13, 2018	8ASA02	1.56
148	19	"Mo Mommy, Mo Problems"	Ian Hamilton	Steven Davis	May 13, 2018	8ASA03	1.88
149	20	"Mission Impos-slug-ble"	Chris Song	Nora Smith	May 20, 2018	7ASA21	1.65
150	21	"Something Old, Something New, Something Bob Caters for You"	Chris Song	Jon Schroeder	May 20, 2018	8ASA05	1.62

=== Season 9 (2018–19) ===
No. overall	No. in season	Title	Directed by	Written by	Original release date	Prod. code	U.S. viewers (millions)
151	1	"Just One of the Boyz 4 Now for Now"	Ian Hamilton	Lizzie Molyneux & Wendy Molyneux	September 30, 2018	8ASA06	2.47
152	2	"The Taking of Funtime One Two Three"	Chris Song	Justin Hook	October 7, 2018	7ASA13	3.08
153	3	"Tweentrepreneurs"	Ryan Mattos	Greg Thompson	October 14, 2018	8ASA09	2.14
154	4	"Nightmare on Ocean Avenue Street"	Tyree Dillihay	Dan Fybel	October 21, 2018	8ASA07	2.80
155	5	"Live and Let Fly"	Chris Song	Rich Rinaldi	November 4, 2018	8ASA11	3.16
156	6	"Bobby Driver"	Ryan Mattos	Scott Jacobson	November 11, 2018	8ASA12	2.23
157	7	"I Bob Your Pardon"	Chris Song	Nora Smith	November 18, 2018	8ASA08	2.91
158	8	"Roller? I Hardly Know Her!"	Kev Wotton	Lizzie Molyneux & Wendy Molyneux	November 25, 2018	8ASA13	1.97
159	9	"UFO No You Didn't"	Tyree Dillihay	Steven Davis	December 2, 2018	8ASA14	2.99
160	10	"Better Off Sled"	Ian Hamilton	Holly Schlesinger	December 9, 2018	8ASA10	4.35
161	11	"Lorenzo's Oil? No, Linda's"	Chris Song	Jon Schroeder	January 6, 2019	8ASA16	2.21
162	12	"The Helen Hunt"	Ryan Mattos	Dan Fybel	January 13, 2019	8ASA17	4.89
163	13	"Bed, Bob & Beyond"	Ian Hamilton	Kelvin Yu	February 10, 2019	8ASA15	1.66
164	14	"Every Which Way but Goose"	Kev Wotton	Holly Schlesinger	February 17, 2019	8ASA18	2.18
165	15	"The Fresh Princ-ipal"	Tyree Dillihay	Greg Thompson	March 3, 2019	8ASA19	1.98
166	16	"Roamin' Bob-iday"	Ian Hamilton	Lizzie Molyneux-Logelin & Wendy Molyneux	March 10, 2019	8ASA20	2.00
167	17	"What About Blob?"	Chris Song	Rich Rinaldi	March 17, 2019	8ASA21	2.08
168	18	"If You Love It So Much, Why Don't You Marionette?"	Ryan Mattos	Katie Crown	March 24, 2019	8ASA22	2.03
169	19	"Long Time Listener, First Time Bob"	Ian Hamilton & Kev Wotton	Scott Jacobson	April 7, 2019	8ASA23	1.76
170	20	"The Gene Mile"	Tyree Dillihay	Steven Davis	April 28, 2019	8ASA24	1.84
171	21	"P.T.A. It Ain't So"	Ian Hamilton	Kelvin Yu	May 5, 2019	8ASA25	1.58
172	22	"Yes Without My Zeke"	Chris Song	Jon Schroeder	May 12, 2019	8ASA26	1.48

=== Season 10 (2019–20) ===
No. overall	No. in season	Title	Directed by	Written by	Original release date	Prod. code	U.S. viewers (millions)
173	1	"The Ring (But Not Scary)"	Mario D'Anna	Lizzie Molyneux & Wendy Molyneux	September 29, 2019	9ASA01	1.82
174	2	"Boys Just Wanna Have Fungus"	Ryan Mattos	Dan Fybel	October 6, 2019	9ASA02	2.34
175	3	"Motor, She Boat"	Tom Riggin	Holly Schlesinger	October 13, 2019	9ASA03	1.64
176	4	"Pig Trouble in Little Tina"	Chris Song	Nora Smith	October 20, 2019	9ASA04	2.45
177	5	"Legends of the Mall"	Matthew Long	Greg Thompson	November 3, 2019	9ASA05	1.51
178	6	"The Hawkening: Look Who's Hawking Now!"	Mario D'Anna	Rich Rinaldi	November 10, 2019	9ASA06	2.06
179	7	"Land of the Loft"	Tom Riggin	Steven Davis	November 17, 2019	9ASA08	1.88
180	8	"Now We're Not Cooking with Gas"	Ryan Mattos	Katie Crown	November 24, 2019	9ASA07	2.29
181	9	"All That Gene"	Matthew Long	Kelvin Yu	December 1, 2019	9ASA10	1.60
182	10	"Have Yourself a Maily Linda Christmas"	Chris Song	Scott Jacobson	December 15, 2019	9ASA09	2.41
183	11	"Drumforgiven"	Mario D'Anna	Jon Schroeder	January 12, 2020	9ASA11	5.76
184	12	"A Fish Called Tina"	Ryan Mattos	Dan Fybel	February 16, 2020	9ASA12	1.51
185	13	"Three Girls and a Little Wharfy"	Tom Riggin	Holly Schlesinger	February 23, 2020	9ASA13	1.58
186	14	"Wag the Song"	Chris Song	Greg Thompson	March 1, 2020	9ASA14	1.43
187	15	"Yurty Rotten Scoundrels"	Tom Riggin	Katie Crown	March 8, 2020	9ASA16	1.28
188	16	"Flat-Top o' the Morning to Ya"	Ryan Mattos	Rich Rinaldi	March 15, 2020	9ASA15	1.44
189	17	"Just the Trip"	Chris Song	Lizzie Molyneux & Wendy Molyneux	March 22, 2020	9ASA17	1.31
190	18	"Tappy Tappy Tappy Tap Tap Tap"	Ryan Mattos	Jon Schroeder	April 19, 2020	9ASA18	1.36
191	19	"The Handyman Can"	Tom Riggin	Kelvin Yu	April 26, 2020	9ASA19	1.29
192	20	"Poops!... I Didn't Do It Again"	Chris Song	Steven Davis	May 3, 2020	9ASA20	1.17
193	21	"Local She-ro"	Ryan Mattos	Scott Jacobson	May 10, 2020	9ASA21	1.04
194	22	"Prank You for Being a Friend"	Tom Riggin	Katie Crown	May 17, 2020	9ASA22	1.28

=== Season 11 (2020–21) ===
No. overall	No. in season	Title	Directed by	Written by	Original release date	Prod. code	U.S. viewers (millions)
195	1	"Dream a Little Bob of Bob"	Simon Chong	Dan Fybel	September 27, 2020	AASA01	1.77
196	2	"Worms of In-Rear-ment"	Chris Song	Nora Smith	October 4, 2020	9ASA23	1.12
197	3	"Copa-Bob-bana"	Ryan Mattos	Holly Schlesinger	October 11, 2020	AASA02	1.26
198	4	"Heartbreak Hotel-oween"	Chris Song	Rich Rinaldi	November 1, 2020	AASA04	1.90
199	5	"Fast Time Capsules at Wagstaff School"	Tom Riggin	Greg Thompson	November 8, 2020	AASA03	1.41
200	6	"Bob Belcher and the Terrible, Horrible, No Good, Very Bad Kids"	Matthew Long	Steven Davis	November 15, 2020	AASA05	1.79
201	7	"Diarrhea of a Poopy Kid"	Tom Riggin	Lizzie Molyneux-Logelin & Wendy Molyneux	November 22, 2020	AASA08	1.77
202	8	"The Terminalator II: Terminals of Endearment"	Ryan Mattos	Kelvin Yu	November 29, 2020	AASA07	1.23
203	9	"Mommy Boy"	Simon Chong	Jon Schroeder	December 6, 2020	AASA06	1.25
204	10	"Yachty or Nice"	Chris Song	Scott Jacobson	December 13, 2020	AASA09	1.81
205	11	"Romancing the Beef"	Tom Riggin	Greg Thompson	February 21, 2021	AASA13	1.24
206	12	"Die Card, or Card Trying"	Matthew Long	Katie Crown	February 28, 2021	AASA10	1.09
207	13	"An Incon-Wheelie-ent Truth"	Simon Chong	Dan Fybel	March 7, 2021	AASA11	1.21
208	14	"Mr. Lonely Farts"	Ryan Mattos	Holly Schlesinger	March 14, 2021	AASA12	1.21
209	15	"Sheshank Redumption"	Chris Song	Jon Schroeder	March 21, 2021	AASA14	1.05
210	16	"Y Tu Tina También"	Matthew Long	Rich Rinaldi	March 28, 2021	AASA15	1.07
211	17	"Fingers-loose"	Simon Chong	Lizzie Molyneux-Logelin & Wendy Molyneux	April 11, 2021	AASA16	1.19
212	18	"Some Kind of Fender Benderful"	Ryan Mattos	Kelvin Yu	April 18, 2021	AASA17	1.05
213	19	"Bridge Over Troubled Rudy"	Chris Song	Scott Jacobson	May 2, 2021	AASA19	0.95
214	20	"Steal Magazine-olias"	Matthew Long	Katie Crown	May 9, 2021	AASA20	1.11
215	21	"Tell Me Dumb Thing Good"	Simon Chong	Dan Fybel	May 16, 2021	AASA21	1.08
216	22	"Vampire Disco Death Dance"	Tom Riggin	Steven Davis	May 23, 2021	AASA18	0.98

=== Season 12 (2021–22) ===
No. overall	No. in season	Title	Directed by	Written by	Original release date	Prod. code	U.S. viewers (millions)
217	1	"Manic Pixie Crap Show"	Ryan Mattos	Nora Smith	September 26, 2021	AASA22	1.60
218	2	"Crystal Mess"	Tom Riggin	Holly Schlesinger	October 3, 2021	BASA01	1.14
219	3	"The Pumpkinening"	Chris Song	Kelvin Yu	October 10, 2021	BASA02	1.77
220	4	"Driving Big Dummy"	Matthew Long	Jon Schroeder	October 17, 2021	BASA03	1.17
221	5	"Seven-tween Again"	Simon Chong	Rich Rinaldi	October 24, 2021	BASA04	1.20
222	6	"Beach, Please"	Ryan Mattos	Scott Jacobson	November 7, 2021	BASA05	1.48
223	7	"Loft in Bedslation"	Matthew Long	Jameel Saleem	November 14, 2021	BASA08	1.16
224	8	"Stuck in the Kitchen with You"	Tom Riggin	Dan Fybel	November 21, 2021	BASA06	1.84
225	9	"FOMO You Didn't"	Simon Chong	Holly Schlesinger	November 28, 2021	BASA09	1.62
226	10	"Gene's Christmas Break"	Chris Song	Katie Crown	December 19, 2021	BASA07	1.60
227	11	"Touch of Eval(uations)"	Ryan Mattos	Greg Thompson	January 9, 2022	BASA10	1.42
228	12	"Ferry on My Wayward Bob and Linda"	Matthew Long	Scott Jacobson	February 27, 2022	BASA13	1.18
229	13	"Frigate Me Knot"	Chris Song	Rich Rinaldi	March 6, 2022	BASA12	1.15
230	14	"Video Killed the Gene-io Star"	Tom Riggin	Jon Schroeder	March 13, 2022	BASA11	0.95
231	15	"Ancient Misbehavin"	Simon Chong	Dan Fybel	March 20, 2022	BASA14	1.01
232	16	"Interview with a Pop-pop-pire"	Ryan Mattos	Katie Crown	March 27, 2022	BASA15	1.05
233	17	"The Spider House Rules"	Tom Riggin & Ryan Mattos	Jameel Saleem	April 10, 2022	BASA16	0.88
234	18	"Clear and Present Ginger"	Chris Song	Lizzie Molyneux-Logelin & Wendy Molyneux	April 24, 2022	BASA17	0.89
235	19	"A-Sprout a Boy"	Matthew Long	Holly Schlesinger	May 1, 2022	BASA18	1.02
236	20	"Sauce Side Story"	Simon Chong & Tom Riggin	Steven Davis	May 8, 2022	BASA21	0.92
237	21	"Some Like It Bot Part 1: Eighth Grade Runner"	Simon Chong	Loren Bouchard & Nora Smith	May 15, 2022	BASA19	1.01
238	22	"Some Like It Bot Part 2: Judge-bot Day"	Ryan Mattos	Loren Bouchard & Nora Smith	May 22, 2022	BASA20	0.93

=== Season 13 (2022–23) ===
No. overall	No. in season	Title	Directed by	Written by	Original release date	Prod. code	U.S. viewers (millions)
239	1	"To Bob, or Not to Bob"	Chris Song	Lizzie Molyneux-Logelin & Wendy Molyneux	September 25, 2022	BASA22	1.67
240	2	"The Reeky Lake Show"	Matthew Long	Rich Rinaldi	October 2, 2022	CASA01	1.06
241	3	"What About Job?"	Tom Riggin	Lizzie Molyneux-Logelin & Wendy Molyneux	October 9, 2022	CASA02	1.68
242	4	"Comet-y of Errors"	Brian Loschiavo	Dan Fybel	October 16, 2022	CASA03	0.92
243	5	"So You Stink You Can Dance"	Ryan Mattos	Jon Schroeder	October 23, 2022	CASA04	1.49
244	6	"Apple Gore-chard! (But Not Gory)"	Chris Song	Scott Jacobson	October 30, 2022	CASA05	1.66
245	7	"Ready Player Gene"	Matthew Long	Jameel Saleem	November 13, 2022	CASA06	1.65
246	8	"Putts-giving"	Tom Riggin	Katie Crown	November 20, 2022	CASA07	1.09
247	9	"Show Mama from the Grave"	Brian Loschiavo	Holly Schlesinger	November 27, 2022	CASA08	1.22
248	10	"The Plight Before Christmas"	Chris Song	Teleplay by : Loren Bouchard; Story by : Kelvin Yu	December 11, 2022	CASA10	1.46
249	11	"Cheaty Cheaty Bang Bang"	Ryan Mattos	Steven Davis	January 8, 2023	CASA09	1.35
250	12	"Oh Row You Didn't"	Matthew Long	Rich Rinaldi	February 19, 2023	CASA11	1.01
251	13	"Stop! Or My Mom Will Sleuth!"	Tom Riggin	Dan Fybel	February 26, 2023	CASA12	0.87
252	14	"These Boots Are Made for Stalking"	Brian Loschiavo	Lindsey Stoddart	March 5, 2023	CASA13	0.78
253	15	"The Show (and Tell) Must Go On"	Ryan Mattos	Jon Schroeder	March 12, 2023	CASA14	0.84
254	16	"What a (April) Fool Believes"	Matthew Long	Greg Thompson	March 19, 2023	CASA16	0.75
255	17	"Crows Encounters of the Bird Kind"	Chris Song	Scott Jacobson	March 19, 2023	CASA15	0.81
256	18	"Gift Card or Buy Trying"	Tom Riggin	Jameel Saleem	April 16, 2023	CASA17	0.67
257	19	"Crab-solutely Fabulous"	Brian Loschiavo	Katie Crown	April 23, 2023	CASA18	0.80
258	20	"Radio No You Didn't"	Ryan Mattos	Holly Schlesinger	April 30, 2023	CASA19	0.82
259	21	"Mother Author Laser Pointer"	Chris Song	Lindsey Stoddart	May 14, 2023	CASA20	0.72
260	22	"Amelia"	Matthew Long & Brian Loschiavo	Loren Bouchard	May 21, 2023	CASA21	0.72

=== Season 14 (2023–24) ===
No. overall	No. in season	Title	Directed by	Written by	Original release date	Prod. code	U.S. viewers (millions)
261	1	"Fight at the Not Okay Chore-ral"	Bernard Derriman	Nora Smith	October 1, 2023	CASA22	1.23
262	2	"The Amazing Rudy"	Ryan Mattos	Lizzie Molyneux-Logelin & Wendy Molyneux	October 8, 2023	DASA01	0.82
263	3	"The Pickleorette"	Chris Song	Steven Davis	October 22, 2023	DASA02	0.78
264	4	"Running Down a Gene"	Matthew Long	Holly Schlesinger	October 29, 2023	DASA03	0.91
265	5	"Bully-ieve It or Not"	Brian Loschiavo	Jon Schroeder	November 5, 2023	DASA04	1.56
266	6	"Escape from Which Island?"	Chris Song	Rich Rinaldi	November 12, 2023	DASA06	1.43
267	7	"The (Raccoon) King and I"	Ryan Mattos	Scott Jacobson	November 19, 2023	DASA05	0.86
268	8	"Wharf, Me Worry?"	Matthew Long	Katie Crown	November 26, 2023	DASA07	0.87
269	9	"Fraud of the Dead: Zombie-docu-pocalypse"	Brian Loschiavo	Jameel Saleem	December 3, 2023	DASA08	1.30
270	10	"The Nightmare 2 Days Before Christmas"	Ryan Mattos	Lindsey Stoddart	December 17, 2023	DASA09	1.50
271	11	"Mission Impossi-Bob"	Chris Song	Steven Davis	January 7, 2024	DASA10	0.98
272	12	"Jade in the Shade"	Matthew Long	Jon Schroeder	March 10, 2024	DASA11	0.79
273	13	"Butt Sweat and Fears"	Brian Loschiavo	Holly Schlesinger	May 19, 2024	DASA12	0.59
274	14	"The Big Stieblitzki"	Ryan Mattos	Scott Jacobson	September 8, 2024	DASA13	1.91
275	15	"The Right Tough Stuff"	Chris Song	Rich Rinaldi	September 15, 2024	DASA14	0.77
276	16	"To Catch a Beef"	Matthew Long	Jameel Saleem	September 22, 2024	DASA15	0.99

=== Season 15 (2024–25) ===
No. overall	No. in season	Title	Directed by	Written by	Original release date	Prod. code	U.S. viewers (millions)
277	1	"The Tina Table: The Tables Have Tina-ed"	Bernard Derriman	Greg Thompson	September 29, 2024	DASA16	0.72
278	2	"Saving Favorite Drive-In"	Brian Loschiavo	Katie Crown	October 6, 2024	DASA17	0.75
279	3	"Colon-ly the Dronely"	Ryan Mattos	Lindsey Stoddart	October 20, 2024	DASA18	1.38
280	4	"For Whom the Doll Toes"	Simon Chong	Loren Bouchard	October 27, 2024	DASA20	0.71
281	5	"Don't Stop Be-cheesin'"	Chris Song	Dan Fybel	November 3, 2024	DASA19	1.05
282	6	"Hope N' Mic Night"	Simon Chong	Loren Bouchard	November 10, 2024	DASA22	0.71
283	7	"Boogie Days"	Brian Loschiavo	Jon Schroeder	November 24, 2024	EASA01	1.32
284	8	"They Slug Horses, Don't They?"	Bernard Derriman	Nora Smith	December 8, 2024	DASA21	1.03
285	9	"Dog Christmas Day After Afternoon"	Chris Song	Steven Davis	December 15, 2024	EASA02	1.16
286	10	"Advice Things Are Ad-Nice"	Ryan Mattos	Holly Schlesinger	December 29, 2024	EASA03	1.20
287	11	"Mr. Fischoeder's Opus"	Brian Loschiavo	Scott Jacobson	May 18, 2025	EASA04	0.52
288	12	"Like a Candle in the Gym"	Chris Song	Lindsey Stoddart	May 29, 2025	EASA05	0.64
289	13	"Snackface"	Ryan Mattos	Rich Rinaldi	June 5, 2025	EASA06	0.53
290	14	"The Place Beyond the Pinecones"	Brian Loschiavo	Katie Crown	June 12, 2025	EASA07	0.80
291	15	"The Lost City of Atlantic"	Chris Song	Dan Fybel	June 19, 2025	EASA08	0.71
292	16	"The Shell Game"	Chris Song	Greg Thompson	July 3, 2025	EASA11	0.58
293	17	"Wild Steal-ions"	Ian Hamilton	Brian Wylie	July 10, 2025	EASA10	0.68
294	18	"Don't Worry, Be Hoopy"	Ryan Mattos	Lindsey Stoddart	July 17, 2025	EASA15	0.60
295	19	"The Dead Bo-ats Society"	Ryan Mattos	Jameel Saleem	July 31, 2025	EASA12	0.62
296	20	"Dad-urday Kite Fever"	Brian Loschiavo	Scott Jacobson	July 31, 2025	EASA13	0.51
297	21	"Mr. Safebody"	Chris Song	Steven Davis	August 7, 2025	EASA14	0.68
298	22	"Insomnibob"	Ryan Mattos	Jon Schroeder	August 14, 2025	EASA09	0.79

=== Season 16 (2025–26) ===
No. overall	No. in season	Title	Directed by	Written by	Original release date	Prod. code	U.S. viewers (millions)
299	1	"Grand Pre-Pre-Pre-Opening"	Chris Song	Loren Bouchard & Nora Smith	September 28, 2025	EASA17	0.63
300	2	"'Til Death Do Us Art"	Brian Loschiavo	Katie Crown	October 5, 2025	EASA16	0.90
301	3	"The Twinnening"	Ryan Mattos	Kelvin Yu	October 19, 2025	EASA18	1.17
302	4	"The Skids in the Hall"	Brian Loschiavo	Rich Rinaldi	October 26, 2025	EASA19	0.67
303	5	"The Secret Guardin'"	Chris Song	Dan Fybel	November 2, 2025	EASA20	0.77
304	6	"Get Her to the Zeke"	Ryan Mattos	Lizzie Molyneux-Logelin & Wendy Molyneux	November 9, 2025	EASA21	1.19
305	7	"Tube for Tina"	Brian Loschiavo	Nora Smith & Holly Schlesinger	November 23, 2025	EASA22	1.21
306	8	"Les Lizárdables"	Ryan Mattos	Steven Davis	December 7, 2025	FASA02	1.12
307	9	"It's a Stunterful Life"	Brian Loschiavo	Lindsey Stoddart	December 14, 2025	FASA03	0.94
308	10	"Heist Things Are Heist"	Chris Song	Scott Jacobson	December 28, 2025	FASA01	1.15
309	11	"The Keyboard Kid"	Ian Hamilton	Rich Rinaldi	April 26, 2026	FASA04	0.89
310	12	"Children of the Carn"	Chris Song	Katie Crown	May 3, 2026	FASA05	0.68
311	13	"Driving Miss Ragey"	Brian Loschavio	Lizzie Molyneux-Logelin & Wendy Molyneux	May 10, 2026	FASA07	0.64
312	14	"Stuck in the Middle with Hu(go)"	Ian Hamilton	Jon Schroeder	May 17, 2026	FASA08	0.83
313	15	"Smellbound"	Ryan Mattos	Dan Fybel	May 17, 2026	FASA06	0.78

== Theatrical film ==
Title	Directed by	Written by	Original release date
The Bob's Burgers Movie	Loren Bouchard & Bernard Derriman	Loren Bouchard & Nora Smith	May 27, 2022

== Shorts ==
Title	Directed by	Written by	Original release date
"My Butt Has a Fever"	Loren Bouchard & Bernard Derriman	Loren Bouchard & Nora Smith	May 6, 2022 (Theatrical); May 27, 2022 (Television)
At a school talent show, the Belcher children, with the help of Teddy, perform a song My Butt Has a Fever, as Mr. Frond does everything in his power to stop them.: Note: The short first premiered at Alamo Drafthouse theaters and a television debut on FXX soon after on May 27, 2022, the same day The Bob's Burgers Movie premiered. The short was planned for a theatrical release in 2020 in front of an undetermined Disney film, the same way that The Simpsons short Playdate with Destiny premiered with Pixar's Onward, but was put on hold due to the COVID-19 pandemic closing down movie theaters.
"On the Fort Day of Christmas"	TBA	TBA	December 7, 2026
A record-breaking Christmas snowstorm means a record-breaking snow fort for the Belcher kids.

== Future episodes ==
Production code	Title
FASA09	"The Day the Music Lied"
FASA10	"Two Teddys and a Funeral, Kind Of"
FASA11	"A-Chair-ican Whoa, Man"
FASA12	"The Governmentalist"
FASA13	"Lock-In Horror Picture Show"
FASA14	"Every Ring's Coming Up Noses"
FASA15	"Feel Like Merkin Love"
GASA01	"The Booby Trap"
GASA02	"Deliverance, But It's Food"
GASA03	"Cinema Para-Deceive-O"
GASA04	"Glove Is A Banglefield"
GASA05	"You Lighthouse Up My Life"
GASA??	"The Sheepening"
GASA??	"Strangers with Randy"
GASA??	"Sub the Ones You're With"
GASA??	"You've Got Whale"
GASA??	"Boo Boo's Clues"
GASA??	"Gone Gayle"
GASA??	"Band By Me"
GASA??	"The Usual Shuck-Spects"
HASA01	"Crimes and Misters' Wieners"
