= Bob's Burgers season 4 =

Bob's Burgers
- Season 4
- DVD cover
- No. of episodes: 22

Release
- Original network: Fox
- Original release: September 29, 2013 – May 18, 2014

Season chronology
- ← Previous; Season 3 Next → Season 5

The fourth season of the animated comedy series Bob's Burgers began airing on Fox in the United States on September 29, 2013, and concluded on May 18, 2014. The show was once again part of Fox's Sunday night lineup, initially airing in its usual timeslot of 8:30 PM Eastern. Beginning on March 9 and continuing for the rest of the season, Bob's Burgers moved to 7:00 PM Eastern; the move came as a result of the addition of Cosmos: A Spacetime Odyssey to the network's lineup.

In this season, Bob subs as the home economics teacher at the kids' school (Bob and Deliver), Linda goes to her high school reunion and ends up singing there (Purple Rain-Union), the family tries to create a local Super Bowl advertisement (Easy Com-mercial, Easy Go-mercial), and the kids set up a trap for Santa Claus (Christmas in the Car).

== Production ==
Guest stars returning include Will Forte, John Michael Higgins, Rob Huebel, Ken Jeong, Kevin Kline, Megan Mullally, Laura and Sarah Silverman, and Paul F. Tompkins, as well as new guest stars that include Bobcat Goldthwait, Jordan Peele, and Molly Shannon.

== Episodes ==
No. overall	No. in season	Title	Directed by	Written by	Original release date	Prod. code	U.S. viewers (millions)
46	1	"A River Runs Through Bob"	Jennifer Coyle	Dan Fybel & Rich Rinaldi	September 29, 2013	3ASA11	4.48
The family faces the wilderness on a camping adventure, but Bob and Linda accidentally get sent downstream. Meanwhile, Tina learns the truth about her Thundergirls troop.
47	2	"Fort Night"	Boohwan Lim & Kyounghee Lim	Mike Olsen	October 6, 2013	3ASA13	4.21
The three kids go out on Halloween, but end up being held captive in their own fort by extra-annoying Millie. Meanwhile, Bob and Linda struggle to create a costume that the kids can use for trick-or-treating.
48	3	"Seaplane!"	Jennifer Coyle	Dan Fybel & Rich Rinaldi	November 3, 2013	3ASA14	3.75
A pilot known as "Upskirt Kurt" flirts with Linda when she signs up for flying lessons. Bob learns of this man, and tries to stop him.
49	4	"My Big Fat Greek Bob"	Don MacKinnon	Scott Jacobson	November 10, 2013	3ASA12	3.17
Bob gets involved in college pranks when he gets a temporary job cooking at a fraternity house. The kids attempt to break into the house's "Room of Secrets".
50	5	"Turkey in a Can"	Boohwan Lim & Kyounghee Lim	Lizzie Molyneux & Wendy Molyneux	November 24, 2013	3ASA16	4.08
Bob is shocked when the Thanksgiving turkey ends up in the toilet. Fueled by rage, Bob goes to desperate measures to make sure every next turkey is safe from the bathroom.
51	6	"Purple Rain-Union"	Tyree Dillihay	Loren Bouchard & Nora Smith	December 1, 2013	3ASA15	3.39
Linda performs at her high school reunion with her old band.
52	7	"Bob and Deliver"	Don MacKinnon	Greg Thompson	December 8, 2013	3ASA18	4.60
Bob is substitute teacher for the home economics class. Teddy learns to dance with the help of Linda.
53	8	"Christmas in the Car"	Bernard Derriman & Jennifer Coyle	Steven Davis & Kelvin Yu	December 15, 2013	3ASA17	5.57
The Belchers go looking for a last-minute Christmas tree and find themselves being pursued by a giant candy cane-shaped truck.
54	9	"Slumber Party"	Jennifer Coyle	Scott Jacobson	January 5, 2014	3ASA21	6.35
Linda invites classmates of a reluctant Louise to a surprise slumber party at the Belcher home. Sick of all the annoyance of her guests, Louise devises schemes to send each of them home.
55	10	"Presto Tina-o"	Chris Song	Kit Boss	January 12, 2014	3ASA20	4.20
Tina enters a young magician's contest in order to win over Jimmy Jr., but is passed up in favor of Tammy. Bob believes a magician has cursed him after refusing to pay for food.
56	11	"Easy Com-mercial, Easy Go-mercial"	Tyree Dillihay	Jon Schroeder	January 26, 2014	3ASA19	3.24
Bob hopes that a Super Bowl commercial for the restaurant will bring in more customers, but he ends up in hot water with the rest of the family.
57	12	"The Frond Files"	Jennifer Coyle	Lizzie Molyneux & Wendy Molyneux	March 9, 2014	4ASA04	2.21
During Wagstaff Middle School's open house, Mr. Frond speaks with Bob and Linda in private about Gene's, Louise's, and Tina's allegedly offensive stories about school life.
58	13	"Mazel-Tina"	Brian Loschiavo	Holly Schlesinger	March 16, 2014	4ASA03	2.44
The Belchers are hired to cater Tammy's bat mitzvah. Tina gets a lot of attention from the boys when Tammy disappears from the party.
59	14	"Uncle Teddy"	Don MacKinnon	Dan Fybel & Rich Rinaldi	March 23, 2014	3ASA22	2.45
Teddy is asked to stay with the kids while Bob and Linda attend a burger convention. Tired of Teddy's restrictions, Tina escapes.
60	15	"The Kids Rob a Train"	Boohwan Lim & Kyounghee Lim	Steven Davis & Kelvin Yu	March 30, 2014	4ASA01	2.26
The Belchers end up seated in a separate car from their kids while on a train trip. Hearing rumors of a chocolate room, the kids and Regular-Sized Rudy attempt to steal all of it.
61	16	"I Get Psy-chic Out of You"	Chris Song	Jon Schroeder	April 6, 2014	4ASA02	2.27
After a couple of accurate predictions, everyone thinks Linda is psychic, much to Bob's dismay.
62	17	"The Equestranauts"	Tyree Dillihay	Dan Mintz	April 13, 2014	4ASA05	1.83
Tina attends her first Equestra-con, a convention based on her favorite animated pony show, The Equestranauts. To her surprise, many of the other attendees are middle-aged men called "Equesticles", one of whom swindles Tina out of a rare doll. Desperate to see it again, Tina turns to Bob for help.
63	18	"Ambergris"	Don MacKinnon	Scott Jacobson	April 20, 2014	4ASA06	1.52
Gene, Louise, and Tina find a large piece of ambergris on the beach, and Louise sells it on the black market. Meanwhile, Bob and Linda are having the restaurant's bathroom renovated when the landlord's brother, Felix, is in town.
64	19	"The Kids Run Away"	Boohwan Lim & Kyounghee Lim	Rich Rinaldi	April 27, 2014	4ASA07	2.26
Louise flees the dentist's office when she learns she needs a filling, and goes to Aunt Gayle's. Linda and Louise place a high-stakes bet, attempted to be sabotaged by Linda and Bob.
65	20	"Gene It On"	Chris Song	Greg Thompson	May 4, 2014	4ASA08	2.23
Tina is unable to speak when she falls and bites her tongue during tryouts for the cheerleading squad, and Louise is "hired" to speak for her. Tension grows as Linda grows more fond of Gene when he makes the team instead of Tina.
66	21	"Wharf Horse (or How Bob Saves/Destroys the Town – Part I)"	Brian Loschiavo	Nora Smith	May 11, 2014	4ASA09	1.97
Bob and Felix try to convince Mr. Fischoeder to sell Wonder Wharf. Meanwhile, Tina chains herself to the carousel when she learns it is slated for demolition.
67	22	"World Wharf II: The Wharfening (or How Bob Saves/Destroys the Town – Part II)"	Jennifer Coyle	Lizzie Molyneux & Wendy Molyneux	May 18, 2014	4ASA10	1.95
Linda and the children rescue Bob and Mr. Fischoeder, who have been tied up under the wharf by Felix.
