= Slumber Party =

A slumber party is a colloquialism for a sleepover.

Slumber Party or The Slumber Party may also refer to:

== Film and television ==
- "Slumber Party" (Bob's Burgers), a 2014 television episode
- "Slumber Party" (Hangin' with Mr. Cooper), a 1993 television episode
- "Slumber Party", an episode from The Buzz on Maggie
- "Slumber Party", an episode from The Berenstain Bears
- "Slumber Party", an episode from Rugrats
- "Slumber Party", an episode from Descendants: Wicked World
- The Slumber Party, a 2023 Disney Channel Original Movie
- "The Slumber Party", an episode from SpongeBob SquarePants
- "The Slumber Party" (The Two of Us), a 1981 television episode

== Music ==
- "Slumber Party" (song), a 2016 song by Britney Spears featuring Tinashe
- "Slumber Party", a song by Nicki Minaj featuring Gucci Mane from the mixtape Beam Me Up Scotty, 2009
- "Slumber Party", a song by Ashnikko featuring Princess Nokia from the mixtape Demidevil, 2021

== Other uses ==
- Slumber Party, a 1985 young adult debut novel by Christopher Pike
