= Ambergris (disambiguation) =

Ambergris is a solid, waxy, flammable substance of a dull grey or blackish colour produced in the digestive system of sperm whales.

Ambergris may also refer to:

- "Ambergris" (Bob's Burgers), an episode of the television series Bob's Burgers
- Ambergris Cay, an island within the Turks and Caicos Islands
- Ambergris Caye, an island in Belize
- Ambergris Glacier, in Antarctica
- Ambergris Stadium, in San Pedro Town, Belize
- "The Ambergris Element", an episode of the television series Star Trek: The Animated Series
- City of Saints and Madmen: The Book of Ambergris, short story collection by Jeff VanderMeer
- "Ambergris", a song by King Gizzard & the Lizard Wizard from Omnium Gatherum
- "Ambergris", a song by Died Pretty from the 1987 album Pre-Deity
