= World Wharf II: The Wharfening (or How Bob Saves/Destroys the Town – Part II) =

- Bob's Burgers episode
- Episode no.: Season 4 Episode 22
- Directed by: Jennifer Coyle
- Written by: Lizzie Molyneux; Wendy Molyneux
- Production code: 4ASA10
- Original air date: May 18, 2014

Guest appearances
- Zach Galifianakis as Felix; Jordan Peele as Fanny; Paul F. Tompkins as Pierre

Episode chronology
← Previous "Wharf Horse (or How Bob Saves/Destroys the Town – Part I)"	Next → "Work Hard or Die Trying, Girl"
- Bob's Burgers season 4

"World Wharf II: The Wharfening (or How Bob Saves/Destroys the Town – Part II)" is the 22nd episode and season finale of the fourth season of the animated comedy series Bob's Burgers and the overall 67th episode, and is written by Lizzie Molyneux and Wendy Molyneux and directed by Jennifer Coyle. It aired on Fox in the United States on May 18, 2014.

== Plot ==
The episode picks up where the previous one left off, which saw Felix vow to kill Mr. Fischoeder and Bob due to Bob convincing Fischoeder to go back on his plan to sell Wonder Wharf to developers who will then tear the park down to build condominiums. Felix takes Bob and his brother underneath the pier housing Wonder Wharf and ties them to one of the pilings supporting it. After being chastised by Mr. Fischoeder for going to all that trouble, Felix explains that his plan is not to shoot them as he originally intended. He instead intends to draw out the process by abandoning them under the pier and waiting for high tide to come in, and since neither Bob nor Mr. Fischoeder can move, they will eventually become trapped under the water and drown.

Meanwhile, Linda mopes about the loss of the opportunity by not getting another restaurant as Felix had previously promised. Linda, Teddy, and the kids then realize that Bob has been missing for hours without contact. Everyone heads back to Bob's Burgers, believing that if he would be anywhere it would be at the restaurant. Once they get there, though, they find out that Bob is not there either and Linda becomes concerned.

Bob tries to call Linda while trapped under the pier but because his phone is too far from his mouth, Linda believes he is butt dialing her and can only hear laughter. She puts the phone on silent, which causes Bob to send several multi-media messages, one of which Tina identifies as a picture of Mr. Fischoeder's buttocks. Linda then deduces that Bob and Mr. Fischoeder are together and probably just drunk. Bob attempts to text and call them again but the phone falls into the water. Linda and the rest try to break the almost unrecognizable text, and start genuinely worrying about Bob. They look for him all over town until they end up at Wonder Wharf, where they see the guilt-ridden Felix. A sound from a nearby horror house (which was heard in Bob's attempted phone call) leads Linda and the kids to believe that Bob is being held captive under the pier.

Felix starts to feel guilty about his actions and goes on to save Bob and his brother. Riding a pedal boat, Felix, Linda, and the kids go where Bob and Mr. Fischoeder are tied up. The tides have gone high and Felix is about to release them when Fanny, Felix's girlfriend whom he promised her own club where she can perform, arrives and says that she will kill Bob and Calvin herself so that she could get her own nightclub. Bob momentarily distracts her by asking her to sing so that Linda can crash her pedal boat on a weak post of the pier. Linda succeeds and the weight of the carousel from above gives in, destroying part of the wharf. Everyone is safe, and only Fanny is sent to jail as Mr. Fischoeder covered for Felix. The Belchers go home.

== Reception ==
Alasdair Wilkins of The A.V. Club gave the episode an A-, saying "Such tension is inevitable when telling a story as experimental as this, and Bob's Burgers strains to match the show's usual goofiness with the very real, very lethal danger Bob finds himself in. So many episodes take place entirely within the Belchers' safe little bubble, a place where they and all the town's other weirdos can hang out and have misadventures that only matter inasmuch as the characters believe that they do; "The Equestranauts" stands out as a particularly good recent example of that form." Robert Ham of Paste gave the episode a 9.5 out of 10, saying "The conclusion to the (not really) nail-biting cliffhanger from last week’s Bob's Burgers didn't pack as meaty of a comedic punch as its predecessor, a fairly understandable letdown after the high of Part 1. But I still can't shake the small bit of disappointment that lingers, and I also wonder if my respect for the first installment of this two-part season finale would have lessened if this were an hour-long block TV rather than being portioned out. Or would I have liked tonight's episode more?"

The episode received a 0.9 rating and was watched by a total of 1.95 million people. This made it the fourth most watched show on Animation Domination that night, losing to American Dad!, The Simpsons and Family Guy with 3.88 million.
