= My Big Fat Greek Bob =

- Bob's Burgers episode
- Episode no.: Season 4 Episode 4
- Directed by: Don MacKinnon
- Written by: Scott Jacobson
- Production code: 3ASA12
- Original air date: November 10, 2013

Guest appearances
- Ken Jeong as Dr. Yap; Kurt Braunohler as Turd; Hannibal Buress as Hefty Jeff; Dana Snyder as Pud; Jonathan Katz as Dean Dixon

Episode chronology
← Previous "Seaplane!"	Next → "Turkey in a Can"
- Bob's Burgers season 4

"My Big Fat Greek Bob" is the fourth episode of the fourth season of the animated comedy series Bob's Burgers and the overall 49th episode, and is written by Scott Jacobson and directed by Don MacKinnon. It aired on Fox in the United States on November 10, 2013.

== Plot ==
Gretchen asks Linda to help her host "marital aid" parties for women. For each different group of women, Linda and Gretchen adapt their strategies, such as making up stories about Bob's lack of sexual prowess in order to break the ice, and better sell the sex toys. Meanwhile, Bob is apprehensive when he fills in for his friend as the cook for a college fraternity, Beta Upsilon Pi. However, he finds the frat's members—including Pud, Hefty Jeff, and Turd—to be down to earth, dorky, and friendly. Pud, the Beta president, explains that they are unpopular and are constantly being pranked by the snooty rival frat, the Alphas. They get Bob to assist them in retaliating against the Alphas by driving them to the Alphas' frat house for a prank which involves putting a rotting fish into the outside unit of a central A/C system. In celebration of his involvement, the Betas have him drink from the frat house treasure: Beta, a hollowed out, taxidermied iguana that was once the house mascot.

Bob spends the night partying with them using a karaoke machine donated to the frat by one of its old alumni, "Slowhand." Hefty Jeff comments that Slowhand is always coming around, trying to relive his glory days, but Pud admonishes him by reminding them that Slowhand has always supported them and given generously to the frat. Bob comes to greatly enjoy the friendship of the Betas and takes the kids to visit the house. They are surprised to find that Dr. Yap is also at the house, and even more surprised to learn that he is "Slowhand." Dr. Yap pushily tries to get the Betas to party and get aggressive over their rivalry with the Alphas, which makes the members uncomfortable. While Yap is upset by the Betas' obvious preference for Bob, he begrudgingly accepts him into their ranks and gives a tour of the house to him and the kids, except for the "Room of Secrets" in the basement, which is for official Betas only.

Later, Bob and the kids go to the frat house only to find Dr. Yap passed out, with his head shaved and his body covered in offensive words and drawings written in marker. Yap wakes up, telling them that the Alphas attacked him and stole Beta, the Iguana. Incensed, Bob and the Betas begin pranking the Alphas, who continue to send them Polaroids of Beta dressed in ludicrous outfits. When the Betas receive a letter of warning from the college dean placing them on academic probation for pranking the Alphas, Yap urges them to make one final strike against the Alphas during an award ceremony for their charity work. Yap has a keg filled with the saliva of his many patients and they plan to rig the keg to explode from under the stage of the ceremony, dousing the Alpha president. As they put the plan into action, the kids manage to break into the Room of Secrets, and find Beta hidden in the wall, along with the Polaroids and outfits allegedly used by the Alphas.

They tell Bob, who realizes that Yap faked the attack and had been pranking his own frat the entire time. Realizing that what Yap has done will result in the Betas being shut down by the dean, Bob rushes to stop them. He confronts Yap, who reveals that he did all this for years in an attempt to foster the same closeness with the Betas that Bob had done effortlessly. Yap merely hated the Alphas, who are revealed to be genuinely upstanding young men who engage in tireless charity work, because they always ignored the Betas, and doesn't care if the Betas are shut down if it will mean a legendary prank against the Alphas. Bob goes on the podium attempting to warn the Betas underneath the stage of Yap's plot. Yap rushes under the stage and sets off the keg, dousing the dean, the Alpha president, and Bob. Bob and Yap are banned from campus, but the Betas are thankful to Bob for finally getting Yap away from them. He takes the Betas to the restaurant for burgers, where Linda and Gretchen are hosting a sex toy party for "cougars." The women are excited to party with the college-age Betas, and they dance the night away.

== Reception ==
Pilot Viruet of The A.V. Club gave the episode a B+, saying "There's an odd factor at play throughout the whole fraternity storyline, though. It turns out that Slowhands is Dr. Yap, the Belcher family dentist (voiced by Ken Jeong; it's more than a little fitting that he's playing a character who has overstayed his welcome in the frat house). I like Dr. Yap, though not nearly as much as Tina does, but what a weird context to bring him back in. It does work, largely because Dr. Yap has already been established as being off the rails, so it's not surprising that he’s staged the fake kidnapping of the iguana in order steal back attention that has been given to Bob. Plus, Dr. Yap is just ridiculous enough (and gross enough, ugh, that spit keg) that he keeps the episode rolling with laughs." Robert Ham of Paste gave the episode an 8.7 out of 10, saying "The subtext of this week's episode isn't necessary to appreciate it, mind you. Like all good subtext, you'll only find it if you're looking. There's plenty of silliness right there on the surface to enjoy. Skim over the top or dig in deep; you'll be satisfied either way."

The episode received a 1.5 rating and was watched by a total of 3.17 million people. This made it the fourth most watched show on Animation Domination that night, losing to American Dad!, Family Guy and The Simpsons with 4.20 million.
