= Bob and Deliver =

- Bob's Burgers episode
- Episode no.: Season 4 Episode 7
- Directed by: Don MacKinnon
- Written by: Greg Thompson
- Production code: 3ASA18
- Original air date: December 8, 2013

Guest appearances
- David Herman as Mr. Frond; Brian Huskey as Mr. Platt and Regular Sized Rudy; Bobby Tisdale as Zeke

Episode chronology
← Previous "Purple Rain-Union"	Next → "Christmas in the Car"
- Bob's Burgers season 4

"Bob and Deliver" is the seventh episode of the fourth season of the animated comedy series Bob's Burgers and the overall 52nd episode, and is written by Greg Thompson and directed by Don MacKinnon. It aired on Fox in the United States on December 8, 2013.

== Plot ==
Tina is delighted when Bob helps Mr. Frond by filling in as the substitute home economics teacher at school, hoping that she can now become someone's teacher's pet. Bob, finding that the home-ec class is really just a class where the school can put the low-scoring students, instead inspires them with cooking by showing them how to pop microwavable popcorn on the stove. Zeke, however, is reluctant to participate. Bob asks Zeke to assist him during a soup cooking demonstration, and Zeke, to his surprise and everyone else's, demonstrates a strong aptitude for cooking and what Bob calls a "perfect palate". Zeke begins to thrive in the class and the food the students cook in class becomes so popular that Bob decides to turn the home-ec room into a fully operational restaurant, to teach the kids the "economic" side of home economics, with Zeke as the head chef. Tina is dismayed that Zeke has become Bob's favorite in class, and after finding herself relegated to dishwashing, decides to transfer to shop class, in hopes of becoming the teacher's pet there.

Bob becomes an excellent and popular teacher around the school. However, the popularity of the new "Home-Ec-staurant" draws business away from the school cafeteria, which threatens the lunch ladies, who are independently contracted through Caf Co. Food Services. The head lunch lady, Hildy, begins menacing Bob, finally taking him to a secret meeting with her boss, who tells Bob that he is in violation of Caf Co.'s contract with the school. He has arranged for Bob to either close down the Home-Ec-staurant and go back to movies or for him to be fired. As he packs his things, the students plead with him to stay and teach them again, but Mr. Frond instructs him to go. In a show of solidarity, the students stand on their desks and rip open bags of unpopped microwavable popcorn. Bob, inspired, decides that they should go out with a bang and serve one last meal to the student body. Using a push cart and a portable grill, they make a mobile hamburger stand that they can wheel to the cafeteria. As they run down the hall, Bob only then realizes that Tina transferred and feels terrible that he ignored her. He finds her at shop class and apologizes, and she joins him and the other students while Tina also proves her new skills in shop class as when a screw starts to fall off a wheel she quickly welds it together. The hamburger cart is too popular for Caf Co. to stop, so they give up, as Bob and Tina share the final Home-Ec-staurant meal together.

Meanwhile, Linda teaches Teddy to dance in preparation for a wedding he will be attending. Though initially uncertain, Teddy is able to relax and express himself freely through dance, though he ends up throwing up in the bounce house set up at the wedding.

== Reception ==
Pilot Viruet of The A.V. Club gave the episode a B+, saying "Bob and Deliver" has a predictable quick-fix ending: Of course there's a "O captain, my captain" moment and of course Bob yanks Tina out of Metal Shop to have her rejoin the "restaurant" and save the day with a piece of metal welded to another piece of metal. But it's hard to complain about an episode that features Bob and a handful of students careening down a hallway on a TV cart. Plus, Bob and Tina are always the best pairing on the show, so any time Bob's Burgers ends on a sweet note between them, I can't help but love it."

Robert Ham of Paste gave the episode an 8.9 out of 10, saying "The series has, this season, been maintaining a nice balance between somewhat emotionally driven episodes like "Seaplane!" and "Turkey in a Can" and goofy diversions like tonight's installment. And even amid the silliness, they still manage to give each character a telling batch of dialogue or action that speak right to their cores. When the writers are able to do that in the midst of ridiculous moments like Linda teaching one of their regulars how to dance, they're just continuing to prove what an amazing crew is behind this show." Ham did applaud the creativity of the episode as it's a minor parody of the Edward James Olmos film "Stand and Deliver".

The episode received a 2.1 rating and was watched by a total of 4.60 million people. This made it the third most watched show on Animation Domination that night, beating American Dad! but losing to Family Guy and The Simpsons with 6.85 million.

Greg Thompson was nominated for a Writers Guild of America Award for Outstanding Writing in Animation at the 67th Writers Guild of America Awards for his script to this episode.
