= Work Hard or Die Trying, Girl =

- Bob's Burgers episode
- Episode no.: Season 5 Episode 1
- Directed by: Jennifer Coyle
- Written by: Nora Smith
- Production code: 4ASA14
- Original air date: October 5, 2014

Guest appearances
- Aziz Ansari as Darryl; David Herman as Mr. Frond; John Michael Higgins as Doug; David Wain as Courtney; Melissa Galsky as Julie; Brian Huskey as Regular Sized Rudy; Jay Johnston as Jimmy Pesto; Carly Simon as herself

Episode chronology
| ← Previous "World Wharf II: The Wharfening (or How Bob Saves/Destroys the Town – Part II)" | Next → "Tina and the Real Ghost" |
- Bob's Burgers season 5

"Work Hard or Die Trying, Girl" is the first episode and season premiere of the fifth season of the animated comedy series Bob's Burgers and the overall 68th episode, and is written by Nora Smith and directed by Jennifer Coyle. It aired on Fox in the United States on October 5, 2014.

== Plot ==
The episode opens with the Belchers and Courtney Wheeler and her father, Doug, arguing their case to Mr. Frond in his office. The story unfolds through a series of unreliable narrator flashbacks:

Wagstaff is set to put on its annual musical and is interested in producing an original student production. Gene feels this is the perfect time to pitch his long-simmering musical adaptation of the 1988 action film Die Hard. Courtney asks Gene if she can be in his musical, having liked it when he shared it with her while they briefly dated. Gene refuses and Courtney instead pitches a musical adaptation of the 1988 romantic-comedy Working Girl with the heavy assistance of Doug's musical resources. Gene accuses Courtney of intentionally ripping off his idea, calling Working Girl the "sassy sister-film to Die Hard." Doug manages to seal the deal by promising to Ms. LaBonz that if they produce Working Girl: The Musical, he will pull strings to get Carly Simon to attend, since Simon sang the film's theme song "Let the River Run." Ms. LaBonz, being a fan of Carly Simon, makes the decision on the spot.

Louise proposes to Gene that they put on a "guerrilla/protest production" of Die Hard: The Musical on the same night as Courtney's Working Girl: The Musical in the school boiler room. They fill the Die Hard cast with the students who were rejected from Working Girl (Zeke, Darryl, the Pesto twins, Regular Sized Rudy, and Peter Pescadero) and begin rehearsals. However, Gene is dissatisfied with the others' performances and decides the night before the production to demote the actors to stage crew and perform the entire show himself.

On opening night, Louise covertly distributes fliers to Die Hard to the audience during the Working Girl performance, which stars Courtney, Jimmy Pesto, Jr., and Tina in the lead roles of Tess McGill, Jack Trainer, and Katharine Parker. Bob and Linda split up to support both shows, but eventually, the crowd watching Working Girl thins out, attracted by Louise's fliers. Doug finally figures out what is going on when Jimmy Pesto is caught sneaking out of Working Girl to see Die Hard. Furious, Doug barges into Die Hard while Gene is performing a song as Holly Gennaro-McClane and throws one of Courtney's shoulder pads at Gene to stop him, hitting him in the face.

The episode returns to the present, revealing that it is still opening night and the subsequent fight between Linda and Doug, Doug's false promise of Carly Simon, and the chaos of the competing musicals is why they have all been called to Mr. Frond's office. Frond decides that musical theater is "too dangerous" and resolves to cancel both performances. Seeing his classmates' disappointment, Gene relinquishes the stage to Courtney's production, stating that he shouldn't ruin musical theater for everyone just to get what he wants. Courtney confesses that she did Working Girl precisely to get back at him and wants him to do his production. The two decide to work together and put on a last minute hybrid production called Work Hard or Die Trying, Girl. After being convinced by Louise that he could win an award for resolving the conflict, Mr. Frond agrees to let the production go forward. Ms. LaBonz then slaps Doug in the face for his bait and switch while paraphrasing the song "You're So Vain".

Meanwhile, the new play features the characters from both Working Girl and Die Hard in a combined situation (both works are owned by 20th Century Fox, as is Bob's Burgers.). Tess and her fellow secretaries are being held hostage by Hans Gruber (Gene) and his band of terrorists (Louise and Peter) with John McClane (Zeke) working to rescue them. Tess steals Gruber's heart with her ambition, leading to an unscripted kiss between Gene and Courtney that the audience approves of. Katharine and Jack even end up together (as Tina wished they did), but McClane still has to throw Gruber from the tower. The audience loves the new production, especially its finale that brings them to their feet and reduces Doug to tears.

The closing credits feature the cast performing a reprise of the closing number with Carly Simon making a cameo appearance to sing with them.

== Reception ==
Alasdair Wilkins of The A.V. Club gave the episode a B, pointing out weaknesses in its structure, and comparing it to the previous season's premiere episode, "A River Runs Through Bob," but stating that both episodes "represent the show trying to stretch beyond its normal storytelling structure and attempt something we haven't quite seen before. The fact that neither episode quite pulls off what it's going for isn't such a big deal, especially when the jokes remain sharp enough to compensate for the less effective delivery mechanism." Ultimately, Wilkins enjoyed the episode, stating that ""Work Hard Or Die Trying, Girl" makes some mistakes, but these are the mistakes a show damn well ought to be making, at least occasionally. And anyway, that final musical made me just so freaking happy, because I can't imagine a better way to announce that, oh yes, Bob's Burgers is back!" Robert Ham of Paste gave the episode a 9.5 out of 10, saying "Loren Bouchard and the gang certainly delivered the goods by emphasizing the show’s remarkable musical talent, the whip crack wit of the scriptwriters, and the strange charm of all the characters within."

The episode received a 1.4 rating and was watched by a total of 3.14 million people. This made it the fourth most watched show on Fox that night, losing to Brooklyn Nine-Nine, The Simpsons and Family Guy.

Nora Smith was nominated for a Writers Guild of America Award for Outstanding Writing in Animation at the 67th Writers Guild of America Awards for her script to this episode.
