= Presto Tina-o =

- Bob's Burgers episode
- Episode no.: Season 4 Episode 10
- Directed by: Chris Song
- Written by: Kit Boss
- Production code: 3ASA20
- Original air date: January 12, 2014

Guest appearances
- Andres Du Bouchet as Sazerac; Laura Silverman as Andy; Sarah Silverman as Ollie; Jordan Peele as Horace; Jenny Slate as Tammy; Bobby Tisdale as Zeke

Episode chronology
← Previous "Slumber Party"	Next → "Easy Com-mercial, Easy Go-mercial"
- Bob's Burgers season 4

"Presto Tina-o" is the tenth episode of the fourth season of the animated comedy series Bob's Burgers and the overall 55th episode, and is written by Kit Boss and directed by Chris Song. It aired on Fox in the United States on January 12, 2014.

== Plot ==
A magician festival is happening in town, and Bob, excited for the festival, creates a promotion for any magicians dining at the restaurant. Their first customer is the magician Sazerac, who dazzles the Belchers with a seemingly impossible trick. Meanwhile, Jimmy Pesto Jr. plans to perform a magic act at the festival's competition. Tina urges him to include her as his magician's assistant, which he does reluctantly. However, she is dismayed to find that Jimmy's routine has little magic and focuses more on dancing. As she attempts to give him advice, Jimmy and Zeke mock Tina, angering her and resulting in Jimmy firing her and picking Tammy as his new assistant. Furious, Tina vows to perform a better magic act and humiliate Jimmy, but finds she is bad at performing magic. She instead settles for sabotaging Jimmy's routine.

At the restaurant, Bob becomes disenchanted by Sazerac and the other magicians when they fail to purchase any food, content to loiter in the booths and use their magic skills to disrespect him. Becoming fed up, Bob throws the magicians out of his restaurant and Sazerac declares him an enemy of magic, writing his name down in a little book. Sazerac warns Bob that he will be plagued by mystical phenomena from this point forward. As unexplainable events begin to happen within the restaurant, Bob becomes intent on striking back against Sazerac. At the competition, where Sazerac is one of the judges, Tina changes the music for Jimmy's dancing magic act to something he cannot dance to. She immediately regrets humiliating him and sets out to help him.

In Sazerac's dressing room, Bob licks all of the catered food and finds the book, ripping the page with his name out of it. Onstage, Tina frees herself from a straitjacket and salvages the act, causing them to win "Best Onstage Chemistry." Backstage, Louise steals Sazerac's book, but the Belchers find a note inside instructing Bob to read the back of the page he tore out. The page has a note from Sazerac telling Bob that he anticipated Bob's payback and Louise picking his pocket, and claims to have farted on the catered food. The Belchers are left stunned.

== Reception ==
Pilot Viruet of The A.V. Club gave the episode an A−, saying "Is it possible for a Tina-centric episode of Bob's Burgers to be bad? I'd be the first to argue that it's just about impossible for any episode of Bob's Burgers to be truly bad—even the slightly disappointing ones are often uproariously funny at points—but to me, Tina is the character that makes the show completely bulletproof. This is especially true for episodes that also prominently feature Jimmy Pesto Jr."

The episode received a 2.0 rating and was watched by a total of 4.20 million people. This made it the fourth most watched show on Animation Domination that night, losing to American Dad!, The Simpsons and Family Guy with 5.22 million.
