= I Get Psy-chic Out of You =

- Bob's Burgers episode
- Episode no.: Season 4 Episode 16
- Directed by: Chris Song
- Written by: Jon Schroeder
- Production code: 4ASA02
- Original air date: April 6, 2014

Guest appearances
- Gary Cole as Sergeant Bosco; Andy Kindler as Mort; Tim Meadows as Mike the Mailman; Pamela Adlon as Olsen Benner; David Herman as Marshmallow

Episode chronology
← Previous "The Kids Rob a Train"	Next → "The Equestranauts"
- Bob's Burgers season 4

"I Get Psy-chic Out of You" is the 16th episode of the fourth season of the animated comedy series Bob's Burgers and the overall 61st episode, and is written by Jon Schroeder and directed by Chris Song. It aired on Fox in the United States on April 6, 2014.

== Plot ==
Linda falls and hits her head, leading her to believe that she has psychic powers: she tells Mort that his missing wallet is in the bathroom and guesses that the caller on the phone is a telemarketer. Bob is skeptical, though all of Linda's predictions come true. She tells Teddy that he will meet a woman in a yellow dress, that Mort will have good financial prospects, and that Gretchen should go on a trip to Philadelphia to win back her ex-boyfriend. The kids are convinced of Linda's psychic abilities and ask her which horse she thinks will win at the track. They prepare to bet their money on "Gelding the Lily." Bob tries to prove Linda isn't psychic, but she manages to guess that he is holding an orange in his hands, which only further convinces her and the kids. As he continues to doubt her, Linda cryptically and hostilely tells him to be careful going down stairs.

Seeing a new report about a missing statue on the pier, Linda calls in a tip as "a local psychic" stating that she sees the statue surrounded by water. Indeed, the statue fell off the pier and the news of her powers reaches Sergeant Bosco. With his job on the line and no other options, he enlists her to help them find "The Little Boy Bandit," a suspected little person who dresses as a child and commits high-profile thefts. Linda unproductively tries to predict where the bandit will strike, until Bosco hurriedly interprets her vague guesses as indicating the Wharf Arts Center as the next target. Meanwhile, the kids go with Teddy to the racetrack as he searches for the woman in a yellow dress. They put their money on Gelding the Lily.

Linda returns home, everyone angrily confronts her about her psychic readings: Gretchen's ex-boyfriend is now married and faithful, Mort's financial advisor told him he was being audited, and Bob has yet to fall down any stairs. Linda realizes that her earlier correct predictions were just based on common sense: she saw Mort's wallet falling out as he walked to the bathroom, telemarketers usually call during that time of the day, and Bob's hands smelled like oranges after holding one. Linda sadly concludes that she isn't psychic and hurries to tell Bosco, so he won't lose his job. Bob goes to the racetrack to find the kids, and spots Tina talking to Gelding the Lily's horse jockey. The jockey drops a duffel bag full of costumes that the Little Boy Bandit used in his robberies, giving him away as the thief. Bob immediately calls Linda, who tells Bosco to get to the track. Gelding the Lily is set to win, but just before he does, the police arrive and the jockey flees, causing Gelding the Lily to lose the race, to the kids' dismay. The Little Boy Bandit is arrested, Sergeant Bosco boastfully takes all the credit, and at home, Linda tells Bob that though she is not psychic, she still believes in psychic phenomena, just as Bob slips and falls down the stairs.

== Reception ==
Alasdair Wilkins of The A.V. Club gave the episode a B, saying "And, if nothing else, “I Get Psy-chic Out Of You” earns its keep with the all-important revelation that Tina is the Belcher family's real comedic genius; she's just stuck writing all the best gags for that natural showman Gene. Even when Bob's Burgers can't quite pull off its main story, it's at a point in its creative life where it can quite effectively coast on the hilarity that ensues whenever two or more Belchers are in the same room together." Robert Ham of Paste gave the episode an 8.9 out of 10, saying "Not a barnburner of an episode, really. Just a rock solid one, with an outlandish premise sold at every turn by the great voice talent on the program. They do give awards for that, don’t they? If not, I think the Emmys or Golden Globes should create one just to show their support of the full cast of this show. Or we should, simply by watching them every week and keeping Bob’s Burgers in our lives for decades to come." The episode received a 0.9 rating and was watched by a total of 2.27 million people. This made it the fourth most watched show on Animation Domination that night, losing to American Dad!, The Simpsons, and Family Guy with 4.77 million.
