= Purple Rain-Union =

- Bob's Burgers episode
- Episode no.: Season 4 Episode 6
- Directed by: Tyree Dillihay
- Written by: Loren Bouchard; Nora Smith
- Production code: 3ASA15
- Original air date: December 1, 2013

Guest appearances
- Megan Mullally as Gayle; Wendy Molyneux as Jen; Brooke Dillman as Stacy; Laura Silverman as Guitar Player; Sarah Silverman as Lead Singer; Lindsey Stoddart as Angie

Episode chronology
← Previous "Turkey in a Can"	Next → "Bob and Deliver"
- Bob's Burgers season 4

"Purple Rain-Union" is the sixth episode of the fourth season of the animated comedy series Bob's Burgers and the overall 51st episode, and is written by Loren Bouchard and Nora Smith and directed by Tyree Dillihay. It aired on Fox in the United States on December 1, 2013. The title of the episode is a reference to the song, film, and album Purple Rain by Prince.

== Plot ==
Linda's high school reunion is coming up, and the planner has asked her and her high school band, The Tatas, to play. Linda refuses because the group's debut performance at the talent show was a disaster after they were shown up by another girl band, Bad Hair Day, who went on to achieve industry fame. It is so traumatic that Linda likewise refuses to even attend the reunion, as her classmates booed and humiliated her off the stage. Bob is relieved not to have to go. However, while singing in the shower, Linda regains her passion for performing and gets the band back together: her former high school friends and her sister, Gayle. However, Gayle only agrees to play with them if she is finally allowed to sing one of her songs; Linda never allowed her to sing her songs during their high school days because they were always very sexual and Gayle had a speech impediment. Linda agrees and further convinces Gayle to come by telling her that her high school crush, Derek Dimatopolis, will be there.

Linda and the Tatas rehearse, writing numerous revenge songs about the classmates who humiliated them. On the night of the reunion, Bob is dismayed to find he has an enormous pimple on his face. Linda hires a babysitter, Jen, for the evening, upsetting Tina, who expected to babysit that night. At the reunion, Linda is excited to perform until, last minute, she is told that Bad Hair Day will be performing first, the band being in town for a big concert and agreeing to drop in for the reunion. Back at the apartment, the kids try to force Jen to take them to the reunion so they can see Linda perform. Jen refuses, but the kids learn of her secret weakness: she is very ticklish. Tina threatens to tickle her into submission, but Jen freaks out and accidentally punches Tina, giving her a black eye. Worried that she will be fired for this, Jen is despondent. Louise proposes that they won't tell if Jen takes them to the reunion, and that they all give one another black eyes so that no one will be suspected of anything (which the rest of them go along with, despite having reservations). Meanwhile, Bob tries to hide his pimple, but it becomes the excited focus of Derek Dimatopolis, now a dermatologist, and several other attendees who work in similar professions. They convince him to have a good time and help him accept his pimple as something unique and unusual.

Bad Hair Day's performance is a success, and Linda, irritated, snaps at Gayle, telling her that they won't be playing any of her songs. Gayle is hurt and refuses to play with the band. As The Tatas get ready to perform, Linda has a flashback to the humiliating night of the talent show and flees the stage, crying. As she runs down the street, Jen and the kids see her and Jen convinces Linda that even if her band is bad, she should perform because she loves it, just as Jen acknowledges that she is a terrible babysitter, but that she loves doing it. Linda returns to the reunion and apologizes to everyone and to Gayle. Rather than singing any of their revenge songs, she invites Gayle to sing her song: a very sexual ode to Derek, who uncomfortably watches from the audience. The song is a rousing success and their classmates cheer. As they drive home, Bob and Linda remark on the good time they had, though the kids insist on popping Bob's pimple, which they succeed in doing, to his disappointment. Bob asks where Gayle is, and Linda states that Gayle found a ride home: after being enticed by her song, Derek and Gayle are hooking up in the back of his car.

== Reception ==
Pilot Viruet of The A.V. Club gave the episode A−, saying "Purple Rain-union" was undoubtedly Linda's show but the rest of the Belchers were in fine form tonight, too. The children were stuck with terrible babysitter Jen and this especially annoyed Tina who had gotten used to her role as babysitter. That montage of the children punching each other so they’d all get black-eyes (what perfect/destructive childhood logic!) interspersed with Bad Hair Day's rock n' roll performance was an episode highlight. Meanwhile, Bob's pimple has him regress back to hating high school but in the adult world—or really, the dermatologist world—the pimple makes him oddly popular and he ends up enjoying the reunion he dreaded going to (the alcohol helps too, I'm sure). That shot of him cheering for Linda was very sweet; I love when Bob's Burgers shows how endlessly devoted Linda is to him and I love it even more when it's Bob's turn for a similar gesture. And Linda definitely deserved it."

Robert Ham of Paste gave the episode a 9.3 out of 10, saying "Something that came to mind while watching this episode is that while I'm still grateful that Fox has given Bob's Burgers a chance to thrive on their vaunted Sunday night schedule, I almost wish they were on a network that let them play things out over a full half-hour with no commercial breaks. As undeniably great as the show is, it seems to whizz by between the ads, and is then over before you realize what hit you. Jokes sometimes don’t get enough time to sink in and you don't get a lot of quiet moments. Sure, they're filled with some amazing songs and gags and one-liners, but a little breathing room would be much appreciated." The episode received a 1.6 rating and was watched by a total of 3.39 million people. This made it the fourth most watched show on Animation Domination that night, losing to American Dad!, and repeats of Family Guy and The Simpsons with 3.54 million.

== Trivia ==
This episode was referenced in Midwest emo song "Edward 40 Hands" by Mom Jeans.
