= Uncle Teddy (Bob's Burgers) =

- Bob's Burgers episode
- Episode no.: Season 4 Episode 14
- Directed by: Don MacKinnon
- Written by: Dan Fybel; Rich Rinaldi
- Production code: 3ASA22
- Original air date: March 23, 2014

Guest appearances
- Lance Barber as JustGrillin'; Brooke Dillman as MeatCute; David Herman as Front Desk Clerk; Keegan-Michael Key as BeeferSutherland; Wendy Molyneux as Jen; Eddie Pepitone as Reggie; Paul Rust as Jonas

Episode chronology
| ← Previous "Mazel-Tina" | Next → "The Kids Rob a Train" |
- Bob's Burgers season 4

"Uncle Teddy" is the 14th episode of the fourth season of the animated comedy series Bob's Burgers and the overall 59th episode, and is written by Dan Fybel and Rich Rinaldi and directed by Don MacKinnon. It aired on Fox in the United States on March 23, 2014.

== Plot ==
Bob and Linda go out of town to a burger convention attended by Bob's online burger forum friends. Teddy volunteers to watch the kids when they cannot find a suitable sitter.

While ordering take-out at Reggie's Deli, Tina becomes enamored with the delivery boy, Jonas. He gives her a ride back to the restaurant on his moped. Teddy, who bonds with Gene and Louise and encourages the kids to call him "Uncle Teddy", thinks this is unsafe. Jonas convinces Tina to let him and his friends hang out at Bob's Burgers after hours and get free food. When Teddy discovers Jonas and his friends in the restaurant, he kicks them out; Tina is embarrassed and angered. Jonas tells Tina to meet them at the lighthouse and to bring them more "free" burgers. Teddy grounds Tina, but she sneaks out to meet the boys at the lighthouse.

Tina finds that Jonas' interests and habits are aggravating to her and to his friends. In an effort to appear "cool", Jonas suggests they break into the lighthouse. A park ranger arrives just as Tina gets inside. Jonas flees, but the ranger catches the other boys. Tina tries to hide, but her moans give her away, and she is caught too.

Meanwhile, Bob and Linda check into the hotel for the convention and learn that the other attendees hate Bob. Due to his lack of experience in online communication, the others mistook his frequent jokes and posts to be insults. Bob tries to explain that he likes them and didn't intend for his posts to be insulting, but the other attendees refuse to accept him and snub him. Attempting to cheer him up, Linda suggests that they enjoy the hotel and its amenities together. However, the other attendees continue to harass them as they wait for their turn at the hot tub. When the attendees complain to the management, Bob and Linda retaliate by dumping mayonnaise and relish into the hot tub. They are kicked out of the hotel, but Bob and Linda agree to leave anyway.

After speaking to the deli owner, Teddy, Gene, and Louise go to the lighthouse and spot Tina in the back of the squad car. Teddy is able to negotiate with the ranger, and she is let go. Tina apologizes to Teddy and thanks him. They see Jonas sneaking back to get his moped, but Teddy is furious that Jonas had only been using Tina all this time and he throws Jonas' moped into the sea but instantly regrets it since it wasn’t really all a big deal.

Bob and Linda return early and call Teddy to let him know. Teddy plans to race back to the restaurant with the kids, but Bob and Linda spot him at the beach from their car.

The kids cooperate with Teddy and go to bed to assuage their parents. Tina finally calls him "Uncle Teddy".

== Reception ==
Pilot Viruet of The A.V. Club gave the episode a A−, saying "The best moments come at the end of the episode, when Teddy loses his cool and throws Jonas' motorbike into the water. Teddy seamlessly transitions into the role of a concerned, protective guardian (and really earns the 'Uncle' title he's been gunning for) for Tina. Bob and Linda would've given Tina a pep talk that makes her feel better, but Teddy's immediate go-to is to punish the boy who hurt her. It's funny and warm, like all of my favorite Bob's Burgers episodes, and it's comforting knowing that Tina—and the rest of the Belcher kids—have so many people who care about them." Robert Ham of Paste gave the episode a 9.3 out of 10, saying "As rough as he is at the job of babysitting, it's endearing to see him try to be a huge part of the Belchers' lives. Even after he rescues Tina from the park ranger, he tries to hurry the kids home to bed before their parents can find out, but alas, they all get caught. Here's hoping we see some more Teddy-centric episodes this season and next."

The episode received a 1.2 rating and was watched by a total of 2.45 million people. This made it the fourth most watched show on Animation Domination that night, losing to American Dad!, The Simpsons, and Family Guy with 4.38 million.
