= The Frond Files =

- Bob's Burgers episode
- Official poster for the episode, designed by Hector Reynoso and Anthony Aguinaldo
- Episode no.: Season 4 Episode 12
- Directed by: Jennifer Coyle
- Written by: Lizzie Molyneux; Wendy Molyneux
- Production code: 4ASA04
- Original air date: March 9, 2014

Guest appearances
- Aziz Ansari as Darryl

Episode chronology
← Previous "Easy Com-mercial, Easy Go-mercial"	Next → "Mazel-Tina"
- Bob's Burgers season 4

"The Frond Files" is the 12th episode of the fourth season of the American animated comedy series Bob's Burgers. Written by Lizzie and Wendy Molyneux, the episode sees Bob (H. Jon Benjamin) and Linda Belcher (John Roberts) visiting a Wagstaff School exhibition entitled "Why I Love Wagstaff." Noticing that their children's reports are missing from the exhibition, they confront school guidance counselor Phillip Frond (David Herman), who gives them the discarded reports to read for themselves.

The episode is divided into three segments corresponding to each Belcher child's report: Louise's (Kristen Schaal), a Terminator-inspired science fiction story; Gene's (Eugene Mirman), a musical act parodying Rock 'n' Roll High School; and Tina's (Dan Mintz), a piece of zombie "friend fiction" which pays homage to Night of the Living Dead. All three stories portray Mr. Frond as an antagonistic character, and he removed them from the exhibition because they were "offensive" and Frond is already in trouble with the school superintendent because his credentials aren't valid in the state.

Comedian Aziz Ansari guest stars in "The Frond Files," voicing recurring character Darryl in the episode's first and third segment. It originally aired on Fox on March 9, 2014, drawing an audience of 2.21 million viewers. "The Frond Files" received generally positive reviews from critics, who praised its humor and pop culture references, and was later cited by Bob's Burgers creator Loren Bouchard as one of his favorite episodes of the series.

== Plot ==
=== Prologue ===
Bob and Linda are at Wagstaff School for an exhibition themed "Why I Love Wagstaff," only to find that their children's reports are nowhere to be seen. They find Mr. Frond, who after unsuccessfully trying to hide from them relents and takes them to his office. Frond explains that he pulled the projects from the exhibition due to their offensiveness, as well as to prevent any further issues with the superintendent, with whom he is already in conflict due to his credentials being invalid in the state. Nonetheless, he allows Bob and Linda to read the reports themselves.

=== "Why I Love Wagstaff" ===
Louise's report begins with the arrival of a robot from the future resembling Mr. Frond, built by the real Frond and sent back in time to eliminate Louise. As Louise flees, she is spotted by an older version of Darryl, who traveled back in time after uncovering Frond's plot. He reveals that the robot was built in retaliation for a prank which Louise will pull off on the day of her eighth-grade graduation ceremony: placing a brownie on Frond's chair, which he sat on thus making him appear to have soiled his pants, which drove him to quit his job from the embarrassment. While pleased with this revelation, Louise chastises Darryl for not bringing back any useful equipment to stop the robot and providing nothing more than a "bucket load of exposition and a stupid mustache."

Louise and Darryl meet up with Gene and Tina as the chase continues and the four are soon cornered in the cafeteria kitchen, where Louise tricks the Frond robot into jumping into a vat of boiling creamed corn that dissolves it. They celebrate, only to discover more Frond robots, all brandishing the clothes of various supporting characters from the series. The scene cuts to the Belcher siblings sitting at a picnic table in a beach in Mexico (or Belize, as Gene claims), where they have been forced into hiding, as Louise finishes writing her journal.

=== "Fart School for the Gifted" ===
Gene's report re-imagines Wagstaff School as the Fart School for the Gifted, where Gene and his fellow students sing and dance to his original songs about farts. Mr. Frond, however, confiscates his keyboard just as he is about to play his most impressive fart sound effect yet. With the help of his siblings, Gene is able to distract Frond and reclaim the keyboard from "Keyboard Jail." Afterwards, he plays a song about farts over the PA system, which ends with a fart so powerful that it ends up destroying the school.

=== "A Tale of Horror" ===
Tina's report is her usual erotic "friend fiction." As she carries out her duties as a hall monitor, busting Tammy for sneaking off-campus and then being tricked into letting her go, Tina talks to members of the basketball team, who will be receiving jock itch vaccinations. She later finds the nurse's office in ruins, and at a pep rally the basketball team re-emerges as zombies. Tina, Gene, Louise, Darryl, Jimmy, Jr. (Benjamin), and Zeke (Bobby Tisdale) escape and try to take refuge in the teacher's lounge—the only room in the school with a lock—only to find that Mr. Frond has locked himself in and is unwilling to let them in, as he needs to survive to rally the survivors. As he explains his cowardice, a zombified nurse emerges from behind and bites him. The horde catches up to them, but Tina discovers her ability to charm the zombies by doing hair flips and awkward erotic dancing; the zombies stop and become her collective boyfriends.

=== Epilogue ===
Bob and Linda find that their children's stories are very creative, with Gene's even bringing Linda to tears. Frond then breaks down and reveals that the real reason he refused to display the reports was because all three portray him as a villain. Bob and Linda try to console him and give advice about relating to children, and a rejuvenated Frond decides to deliver a speech to the superintendent, though still refusing to display the reports. He stands up, not noticing that he has been sitting on a brownie the entire time. Bob and Linda keep silent and take Gene's confiscated keyboard as they leave. At the Belcher residence, Louise gets a subconscious feeling that her prank has taken effect.

== Production ==
"The Frond Files" was written by Lizzie and Wendy Molyneux and directed by Jennifer Coyle. In an interview with Rolling Stone, Bob's Burgers creator Loren Bouchard cited "The Frond Files" as one of his favorite episodes of the series and stated: "Again, the fantasy life of the kids—being inside their heads for so long is really fun for us." Bouchard revealed that producing Gene's musical number in the episode's second segment "was such a fun indulgence" for the Bob's Burgers crew.

Comedian Aziz Ansari guest stars in "The Frond Files," reprising his role as the recurring character Darryl; the episode's first segment depicts an older version of the character who travels back in time to present-day Wagstaff School. Ansari first revealed his appearance in a Reddit "Ask Me Anything" thread, where he stated that the episode was a "great idea" and that "anyone [who] is a fan of Terminator 2 is going to be VERY [sic] pleased." On March 7, 2014, two previews of the episode were uploaded to YouTube: a clip from "Fart School for the Gifted" on the Animation Domination channel, and a behind-the-scenes animatic on the Behind Bob's Burgers channel. An official poster for "The Frond Files," designed by Hector Reynoso and Anthony Aguinaldo, was later posted on the official Bob's Burgers writers' blog on March 9, coinciding with the episode's airing, followed by an extended music video of Gene's fart song on March 18.

The episode was dedicated to the memory of Oliver Miles Cross, writers Lizzie and Wendy Molyneux's nephew. Cross died in 2013 from leukemia at the age of 5. Wendy went on to channel a fundraiser to raise funds for CureSearch in his honor.

== Cultural references ==
Louise's segment, "Why I Love Wagstaff," is a science fiction story that bases major elements of its plot, including the arrival of a robot from the future, on the Terminator film series—in particular the second installment, Terminator 2: Judgment Day (1991). A scene in the segment where the central characters take refuge in a kitchen references a similar scene from the 1993 film Jurassic Park. Gene's segment, "Fart School for the Gifted," spoofs the 1979 musical comedy film Rock 'n' Roll High School and plays on the "adults v. kids theme of '80s films." Also Mr. Frond's appearance is based on Principal Togar, also from Rock and Roll High School. Tina's segment, "A Tale of Horror," is a homage to the 1968 zombie horror film Night of the Living Dead, and as such is animated in black-and-white.

== Reception ==
"The Frond Files" first aired in the United States on March 9, 2014 on Fox, as a part of the Animation Domination programming block. It marked the series' return after a two-month hiatus, along with its debut at new earlier 7:00 time slot to make way for airings of Cosmos: A Spacetime Odyssey. The episode was watched by 2.21 million viewers and received a 0.9/3 Nielsen rating in the 18–49 demographic, becoming the fourth most-watched program of the Animation Domination block for the night.

Pilot Viruet of The A.V. Club gave "The Frond Files" a grade of B+, writing that the episode was "incredibly funny and reminded [her] of why the Belchers are [her] favorite family currently on television." However, she felt that the episode "didn't quickly become a favorite the way that many Bob's Burgers episodes do" and was unsure of whether she "dug the vignette format," adding: "Much of it, as funny as it was, seemed like a retreading of things that we already knew." Nonetheless, Viruet was positive towards its "one-liners and quick jokes" and stated that "every character—and every voice actor—was on point."

Giving the episode an 8.9 out of 10, Robert Ham of Paste cited "The Frond Files" as "one of the finest and funniest [episodes] of an already great fourth season." Ham wrote: "The whole thing is one ridiculous and brilliant pop culture reference and bit of silliness after the other. Yet, it again emphasizes the deep bond that the family has." Matt Brassil of Heave Media praised the Terminator and Jurassic Park references in Louise's act of the episode, and while noting that Gene's story "falls a little flat to lower your expectations," described Tina's "zombie love story" as "easily the funniest act...loose on plot but high on substance."
