= Tina and the Real Ghost =

- Bob's Burgers episode
- Episode no.: Season 5 Episode 2
- Directed by: Boohwan Lim; Kyounghee Lim
- Written by: Steven Davis; Kelvin Yu
- Production code: 4ASA13
- Original air date: November 2, 2014

Guest appearances
- Andre Royo as Marcus; Brian Huskey as Phil; Jordan Peele as Don

Episode chronology
← Previous "Work Hard or Die Trying, Girl"	Next → "Friends with Burger-fits"
- Bob's Burgers season 5

"Tina and the Real Ghost" is the second episode of the fifth season of the animated comedy series Bob's Burgers and the overall 69th episode, and is written by Steven Davis and Kelvin Yu and directed by Boohwan Lim and Kyounghee Lim. It aired on Fox in the United States on November 2, 2014.

== Plot ==
The basement storage space of the restaurant has a bug infestation and Bob has an exterminator come to check it out. However, the exterminator claims the basement is haunted and refuses to treat the infestation, claiming they need to make contact with the spirit to get rid of it. Linda and the kids decide to use a Ouija board to communicate with the ghost and trap it in a shoebox to get rid of it. Using the board, they learn that the ghost is a 13-year-old boy named Jeff, which piques Tina's interest. After "trapping" Jeff in the box, Tina refuses to throw "him" out and brings him with her to school. Tammy, Jocelyn, Zeke, and Jimmy Jr. taunt Tina about the box, until Louise has them all use the Ouija board to communicate with Jeff. They become convinced Jeff is real, and through the board, learn that Jeff is cool and that he has a crush on Tina. Meanwhile, word of the ghost sends two "ghost hunters" to the restaurant, who take up shop investigating paranormal activity around the premises. With Halloween fast approaching, their presence and the rumors of a ghost bring increased business to the restaurant.

Tina and Jeff begin going out, earning her attention from her friends, though she has some doubts about whether Jeff is real. However, Tammy takes the box and claims that Jeff left a message written in steam on the girls' bathroom mirror that says he's breaking up with Tina and is now dating Tammy. Tina is heartbroken. The family tries to decide how to cheer Tina up and Louise reveals to the rest of the family that she controlled the Ouija board and made Jeff up, but did not anticipate that Tina would fall in love with him or that Tammy would one-up her by stealing Tina's popularity with a similar ruse. Louise opts to tell Tina the truth, but Linda tells her doing so would only make Tina feel stupid and even more heartbroken. Louise and Gene resolve to get back at Tammy by scaring her on Halloween night when the older kids plan to enter a mausoleum in the nearby cemetery. Tina surprises them by joining the group and they head into the mausoleum, which immediately shuts and traps them inside in complete darkness. Louise takes this opportunity to steal the box and fill it with bugs from the restaurant and gives it back to Tammy to open. The kids light a candle and are frightened to find a message written in blood on the mausoleum walls, allegedly from Jeff, condemning them all to Hell.

Scared, Tammy confesses that she wrote the fake breakup message and throws the box away, causing the bugs to swarm them all. Tina calms everyone down by revealing that she pretended the mausoleum door was locked and wrote the message before they arrived in ketchup to scare them, having realized long ago that Jeff was not real. She explains that they all believed in Jeff because he was able to give them something they wanted: Tina wanted a boyfriend, Zeke wanted to believe in the afterlife, Jocelyn wanted another way to conform, and Tammy wanted Jeff as a status symbol. Tina states that they can get these things from themselves, though they all agree that Tammy is terrible. Louise is impressed that Tina pulled such a great Halloween prank on all of them. Meanwhile, wrapping up their investigation, the ghost hunters leave, claiming that their paranormal services balance out their tab at the restaurant. When Bob and Linda refuse, they try to claim that they too are ghosts, but Bob forces them to pay their tab.

== Reception ==
Alasdair Wilkins of The A.V. Club gave the episode an A−, citing the series' strength of understanding and firmly establishing its characters, stating "“Tina And The Real Ghost” is Bob’s Burgers finding new ways to explore its kid characters and their relationship dynamics, and all it needs to get that process started is one very cool ghost in a shoebox." Robert Ham of Paste gave the episode an 8.7 out of 10, saying "The plot was decidedly thin, but it was really its own vessel to move young Tina one step forward toward maturity. For a character that usually winds up stumbling and fumbling through life, it was nice to see her score a decisive victory for once."

The episode received a 1.5 rating and was watched by a total of 2.89 million people. This made it the third most watched show on Fox that night, losing to Brooklyn Nine-Nine and The Simpsons.
