= Ambergris (Bob's Burgers) =

- Bob's Burgers episode
- Episode no.: Season 4 Episode 18
- Directed by: Don MacKinnon
- Written by: Scott Jacobson
- Production code: 4ASA06
- Original air date: April 20, 2014

Guest appearances
- Zach Galifianakis as Felix Fischoeder; Bill Hader as Mickey; Kevin Kline as Calvin Fischoeder; Dom Irrera as The Nose

Episode chronology
← Previous "The Equestranauts"	Next → "The Kids Run Away"
- Bob's Burgers season 4

"Ambergris" is the 18th episode of the fourth season of the American animated comedy series Bob's Burgers, and the 63rd episode overall. Written by Scott Jacobson, the episode sees the Belcher children—Tina (Dan Mintz), Gene (Eugene Mirman), and Louise (Kristen Schaal)—discovering a lump of ambergris, which they decide to sell illegally with the assistance of former bank robber and family friend Mickey (guest voiced by Bill Hader) upon discovering its high monetary value. Meanwhile, Mr. Fischoeder (guest voiced by Kevin Kline) brings in his neurotic brother Felix (guest voiced by Zach Galifianakis) to help Bob (H. Jon Benjamin) fix the plumbing system in his restaurant's bathroom.

"Ambergris" originally aired on April 20, 2014 on Fox and drew an audience of 1.52 million viewers. Nonetheless, critical reviews of the episode from The A.V. Club and Paste were generally complimentary towards its humor and plot lines, with the latter review giving particular praise to Galifianakis' guest role as Felix Fischoeder.

== Plot ==
Tina, Gene, and Louise find a mysterious lump on the beach that turns out to be valuable ambergris, which could fetch up to $30,000 on the black market. Louise becomes obsessed with selling it and enlists the help of Mickey, an ex-bank robber, to broker a deal. However, Tina switches the ambergris with a cantaloupe, and Louise gets scammed. After a chaotic chase involving Mickey and "The Nose," Tina destroys the ambergris in a deep fryer. Meanwhile, Felix takes over the restaurant's bathroom renovations, leading to a disastrous unveiling party where the plumbing doesn't work and the design confuses guests. In the end, Felix has a tantrum, and the family convinces him to join the party with a chant, while Louise sarcastically expresses gratitude for how calm and rational her family is.

== Reception ==
"Ambergris" first aired in the United States on April 20, 2014 on Fox, as a part of the Animation Domination programming block. The episode was watched by 1.52 million viewers and received a 0.6/3 Nielsen rating in the 18–49 demographic, becoming the third most-watched program of the Animation Domination block for the night, but also garnering the lowest ratings of any Bob's Burgers episode to date.

David Kallison of The A.V. Club gave the episode a B+ grade, describing it as "funny, with one-liners dropping almost every other beat," and particularly praising "the jokes that are unique to [the show's] characters." Kallison felt that the episode's subplot involving Felix "delivers some good lines" but was "less satisfying narratively" than the main plot, adding that the Belcher children "easily have all the best lines" and noting: "'Ambergris' finds the sweet spot between plot, humor, and sentimentality when it's revealed in the end that that Louise was carrying a fake rock to the deal, thanks to Tina's last-minute switcheroo... Despite the absurdity of the episode, it feels like Tina and Louise really are sisters who really do love each other in a realistically begrudging way."

Robert Ham of Paste rated the episode 9.1 out of 10 and stated that both plot lines "added up to an immensely satisfying episode with some of the most laugh-out-loud moments and lines of the whole season. Ham was complimentary of Zach Galifianikis' guest performance as Felix, writing that he "does a great job playing this whole thing with some of the subtlety he brought to the otherwise unsubtle Due Date."
