= Slumber Party (Bob's Burgers) =

- Bob's Burgers episode
- Episode no.: Season 4 Episode 9
- Directed by: Jennifer Coyle
- Written by: Scott Jacobson
- Production code: 3ASA21
- Original air date: January 5, 2014

Guest appearances
- Rachel Dratch as Jodi; Katie Crown as Harley; Kathryn Hahn as Jessica; David Herman as Mr. Branca

Episode chronology
← Previous "Christmas in the Car"	Next → "Presto Tina-o"
- Bob's Burgers season 4

"Slumber Party" is the ninth episode of the fourth season of the animated comedy series Bob's Burgers and the overall 54th episode, and is written by Scott Jacobson and directed by Jennifer Coyle. It aired on Fox in the United States on January 5, 2014.

== Plot ==
Worried that Louise does not have any friends, Linda throws a surprise slumber party consisting of four of Louise's female classmates, none of whom Louise likes: over-talkative Harley, "germaphobe" Jodi, compulsive braider Abby, and boring Jessica. Louise resolves to drive each girl away and end the party. She tells Jodi that Linda suffers from numerous infections; scares Harley into believing that Gene's secret, deformed, violent twin is about to be let out from the Belcher's basement; and refuses to allow Abby to braid her hair. Each girl demands to be driven home, leaving only Jessica, who went to bed early. When Louise goes to drag Jessica out of bed, she finds only a walkie-talkie, over which Jessica tells her that a possession of hers is missing. Suspecting Louise stole it to mess with her, she refuses to leave until her possession is returned to her, and won't tell Louise what it is. In the course of tracking down Jessica in the apartment, Louise finds her to be much more mysterious, resourceful, and cunning than she initially thought. Louise spies Jessica hiding behind a curtain, and a pillow fight ensues between the girls.

Meanwhile, Linda's fascination with an alley raccoon, whom she dubbed "Little King Trashmouth" in "Two for Tina," reaches its peak when he is ousted from his territory by a larger raccoon (dubbed "El Diablo"). Linda takes in Little King Trashmouth, and she, Bob, and Teddy conspire to remove El Diablo and "reinstate the king." After the raccoon escapes Bob and Linda's bedroom, the kids find him carrying Jessica's missing item: a pair of urine-soiled pajama bottoms. Impressed with Jessica's method of keeping her bedwetting secret at slumber parties, Louise assures her that she won't tell anyone at school. They bond over their pillow fighting skills and overbearing mothers. Louise invites her to stay the night, and Linda delights in Louise finding a friend in Jessica.

In the alley outside the restaurant, Teddy catches El Diablo using a trap with one of Bob's burgers as bait. Bob shoos Little King Trashmouth out of the house, and Linda leaves some red wine out for Little King Trashmouth.

== Reception ==
Pilot Viruet of The A.V. Club gave the episode a B, specifically discussing how the episode further illustrates Louise's characterization as someone who "can be mean...but [is] not evil". They also noted a fondness for Jessica and the development of Louise's character, stating, "Out of all of Louise's previous enemies, I think Jessica is my favorite. She's on Louise's level: Jessica is clever, she doesn’t give up, she knows how to pick locks, and she understands what makes Louise tick...The two girls even end up bonding over their crazy mothers and pillow-fighting skills. Louise isn't going to morph into a social butterfly with a giggly best friend, but this is a nice step in the right direction."

Robert Ham of Paste gave the episode a 9.6 out of ten, saying, "I have to admit that this is the episode I laughed the least at...[T]here wasn't a huge amount of stuff to guffaw at. Instead, 'Slumber Party' turned out to be the most subtly heartwarming edition of the show’s fourth season, with Linda's worries for her eccentric kids and Louise's slight insecurities leaching in to the story quietly. That is flat out exceptional scriptwriting, folks, and another reason why you shouldn't miss out on the peerless run Bob's Burgers is on."

The episode received a 2.9 rating and was watched by a total of 6.35 million people. This made it the second watched show on Animation Domination that night, beating American Dad! and Family Guy but losing to The Simpsons with 12.04 million.
