= Easy Com-mercial, Easy Go-mercial =

- Bob's Burgers episode
- Episode no.: Season 4 Episode 11
- Directed by: Tyree Dillihay
- Written by: Jon Schroeder
- Production code: 3ASA19
- Original air date: January 26, 2014

Guest appearances
- Jordan Peele as Sandy Frye; Paul F. Tompkins as Randy Watkins

Episode chronology
← Previous "Presto Tina-o"	Next → "The Frond Files"
- Bob's Burgers season 4

"Easy Com-mercial, Easy Go-mercial" is the 11th episode of the fourth season of the animated comedy series Bob's Burgers and the overall 56th episode, and is written by Jon Schroeder and directed by Tyree Dillihay. It aired on Fox in the United States on January 26, 2014.

== Plot ==
In order to combat Jimmy Pesto's boost in customers, Bob hires Randy Watkins to make him a Super Bowl commercial. When the commercial that Louise scripted proves to be terrible, they get football star Sandy Frye to star in their commercial with the catch phrase "Bob's burgers goes great with Frye." When the commercial airs, Bob's family is upset to learn that Bob has edited out all of his family's screen time. The argument is interrupted when the commercial following Bob's ends up being Jimmy Pesto's, also starring Sandy and using the same punch line.

Bob runs over to Pesto's to call him out on copying his idea and Sandy admits to going to eat at Pesto's after he shot Bob's commercial. Though Pesto's customers ignore Bob's speech about how his commercial was a bad idea but he has good food, Bob's family hears and decides to forgive him. In a subplot, Gene has a tradition of holding in his bowel movements to have a "Super Bowel" during the Super Bowl half time. Gene ends up using the bathroom at Pesto's and clogs the toilet leading to it overflowing and flooding the restaurant with sewage. At the end of the episode, we see that Sandy was also in a noodle commercial with the same catch phrase. We also see Bob's new commercial featuring his family.

== Reception ==
The episode received a 1.5 rating and was watched by a total of 3.24 million people. This made it the fourth most watched show on Animation Domination that night, losing to American Dad!, The Simpsons and Family Guy with 4.11 million.

Genevieve Valentine of The A.V. Club gave the episode a 'B+', "Overall, though, this is another solid installment of a great season, with the inherent gimmick of the Super Bowl suitably drowned in the sublimely talentless Belcher charm. And yes, we do get to see the all-family version of the commercial, which is just as great and terrible as you imagine. I hope we see it again." Robert Ham of Paste gave the episode an 8.8 out of 10, saying "So, while it's charming and funny to see the Belchers trying to make a commercial to air on Super Bowl Sunday in hopes of roping customers away from Pesto's, you know from the get-go that it's going to be a failed endeavor. No matter though, it's a noble failure and a very funny one, too."
