= Christmas in the Car =

- Bob's Burgers episode
- Episode no.: Season 4 Episode 8
- Directed by: Bernard Derriman; Jennifer Coyle
- Written by: Steven Davis; Kelvin Yu
- Production code: 3ASA17
- Original air date: December 15, 2013

Guest appearance
- Bobcat Goldthwait as Gary

Episode chronology
← Previous "Bob and Deliver"	Next → "Slumber Party"
- Bob's Burgers season 4

"Christmas in the Car" is the eighth episode of the fourth season of the animated comedy series Bob's Burgers and the overall 53rd episode, and is written by Steven Davis and Kelvin Yu and directed by Bernard Derriman and Jennifer Coyle. It aired on Fox in the United States on December 15, 2013.

== Plot ==
On November 1, Linda sets up the Christmas tree. When it dies on Thanksgiving, the Belchers get a new one the next day. When it dies on Christmas Eve, the family is forced to seek out a Christmas tree at a far off lot an hour away. Bob asks Teddy to check on the ham he is cooking, but Teddy is inadvertently caught in a trap set by Louise to catch Santa. Teddy finds himself pinned under the refrigerator as the Belchers search for their tree.

While pulling out of the tree lot, their car is almost hit by a large semi truck decorated to look like a candy cane. Linda tries to spread Christmas cheer to the irritated driver by honking the horn in time to "Jingle Bells", but, as Bob tells her, all the driver can hear is honking. The semi takes off and the Belchers head home. However, Bob notices that the candy cane truck was actually waiting for them and tries to run them off the road. The rest of the family believe it's all in Bob's head and that the candy cane truck was just driving past them. Linda has them pull over at a diner that specializes in Dutch baby desserts and orders one to go. Bob attempts to report the truck to an irate police officer, but to no avail.

Back on the road, the candy cane truck reappears and nearly runs them off the road again, with the family now believing Bob. They pull off into a side road into the woods to hide as the candy cane truck pursues them, but find their car is stuck in the snow. They are unable to call for help because Gene has used up the cellphone's batteries waiting on hold to request a Christmas carol, "Jingle in the Jungle", on the radio. The candy cane truck finds them and begins approaching them. Bob tells Linda and the kids to stand back and prepares to confront the driver, who turns out to be a tiny man named Gary. Gary tries to fight Bob, telling him that he is alone on Christmas because he must drive the candy cane truck across the country in one night from a Christmas Eve parade to a Christmas Day parade the next day. The rude honking made him snap. Recognizing that Gary is no threat and having a difficult Christmas, Bob and Gary come to an understanding. Gary helps tow their car out of the snow and Linda gives him her Dutch baby to enjoy during his cross-country drive, which touches him. The Belchers return home and are shocked to find Teddy trapped under the fridge, who asks them to read his Christmas card to them.

== Reception ==
Pilot Viruet of The A.V. Club gave the episode an A, saying "For an episode where the Belcher family is often in immediate danger, “Christmas in a Car” is full of Yuletide magic. The children, particularly and predictably Louise, are obsessed with the idea of catching Santa Claus and have built a booby trap in the house; we learn Tina may or may not still believe in Santa; Linda's love and obsession with Christmas (and her planning for future holidays) is a running joke throughout; even the seemingly psychopathic trucker has Christmas-related reasons for his actions. Also, there's Teddy!"

Robert Ham of Paste gave the episode a 9.8 out of ten, saying "No lessons were learned. No heartfelt moments of joy and togetherness came to light. Just some strange admissions from the family when they were about to be spotted by their candy-cane-driving nemesis (Gene: “I think I have the best legs in the family and the smoothest bottom.” Tina: “I was the one who didn’t flush.”) and a little smattering of the holiday spirit for good measure."

The episode received a 2.4 rating and was watched by a total of 5.57 million people. This made it the third most watched show on Animation Domination that night, beating American Dad! but losing to Family Guy and The Simpsons with 8.48 million.
