= The Kids Run Away =

- Bob's Burgers episode
- Episode no.: Season 4 Episode 19
- Directed by: Boohwan Lim; Kyounghee Lim
- Written by: Rich Rinaldi
- Production code: 4ASA07
- Original air date: April 27, 2014

Guest appearances
- Ken Jeong as Dr. Yap; Megan Mullally as Gayle

Episode chronology
← Previous "Ambergris"	Next → "Gene It On"
- Bob's Burgers season 4

"The Kids Run Away" is the 19th episode of the fourth season of the animated comedy series Bob's Burgers and the overall 64th episode, and is written by Rich Rinaldi and directed by Boohwan Lim and Kyounghee Lim. It aired on Fox in the United States on April 27, 2014.

== Plot ==
Bob and Linda take the kids to Dr. Yap's office for a dental checkup. Louise learns that she has a cavity, but is too afraid to get the necessary filling. She flees out the window (ordering Dr. Yap, who is intimidated by her, to wait ten minutes before alerting her parents of her departure). Bob and Linda are horrified when they discover their 9-year-old daughter is nowhere to be found, but Bob reasons that Louise will have no choice but to come home soon.

With no options for housing available, Louise reluctantly takes a bus to Aunt Gayle's drab studio apartment, planning to hide out until further notice. Gayle calls Linda, alerting her to Louise's whereabouts. Bob and Linda know that Louise will never voluntarily agree to the filling, so "creative parenting" will be necessary to lure her back. To help with the plan, they send Tina and Gene to stay with Aunt Gayle as well. Linda then presents Louise with a wager: if she can make it through the weekend without being driven crazy by Gayle's neurotic behavior, she will not have to get the filling. If she cracks, she must comply. Louise confidently agrees to the bet, unaware that her sister Tina is acting as her parents' "inside man," communicating with them via text message.

Linda texts Tina instructions on how to unleash Gayle's odd behavior. The kids are forced to replace the decorative claw caps on Gayle's three ill-tempered cats, listen to her excruciating poetry, and play her completely senseless homemade board game, "Gayle Force Winds." Louise begins to get irritated, but refuses to give up. With one day left before Louise technically wins the bet, Bob and Linda plan a stakeout outside Gayle's apartment. They are joined by an uninvited Teddy, who keeps them awake with his snoring. To their dismay, Louise makes it through the night without surrendering, and they employ their last resort: Linda texts Tina, asking her to give Louise ice cream for breakfast. Louise accepts, but the ice cream upsets her cavity and causes intense pain. Bob, Linda, and Teddy enter the apartment to pick up the kids, and Louise admits to Gayle that she is frightened of the dentist. To everyone's surprise, Gayle concocts an ingenious plan to turn Louise's fear "into make-believe." Louise trusts her, and agrees to return to Dr. Yap's office.

Louise's filling appointment has been set up like the ending of an action movie. Gayle escorts Louise, the "asset," through the dentist's office, preceded by Gene and Tina acting as bodyguards. Dr. Yap, aware of the setup, plays along and tells Louise that the fate of the universe rests with her, and that she must get the filling in order to save the world. Bob, Linda, and Teddy arrive as the "enemies," firing invisible weapons around the exam room as Louise bravely allows Dr. Yap to repair her tooth.

Afterwards, Bob marvels that Gayle actually possesses some impressive parenting skills.

== Reception ==
Alasdair Wilkins of The A.V. Club gave the episode a B+, saying “The Kids Run Away” isn’t quite the show firing on all cylinders, but it’s a consistently funny half-hour of television. As Gayle, Megan Mullally finds some nice tones to play beyond just crazy cat lady; I particularly liked Gayle’s palpable anger with the pound that has until now refused to give her that fourth cat. Tina proves a natural man-on-the-inside because she’s so perfectly unconvincing; anyone else might sound stilted when leading Gayle into the next insane activity, but that’s just how Tina always sounds. But the real comedic stars of this episode are Bob and Linda, even as they remain on the sidelines. Without the kids around to keep them busy, the pair pass the time riffing about parenting books—something Linda is convinced is not actually a thing—and having impromptu sex; it’s a nice affirmation of just how much Bob and Linda really do love each other, even if they’re usually too exhausted by life to notice it."

Robert Ham of Paste gave the episode a 9.5 out of 10, saying "I’ve probably said this already in my reviews, but Bob’s Burgers really does work best when there’s just one plot thread for all the characters to work off from. The little tendrils that feed off of it make for some great color and weird bits of humor, like Teddy’s suggestion that when Bob and Linda stake out Gail’s apartment they get some food (“Get some steak! It’ll be a takeout steak stakeout!”), but it follows the through line without getting distracted by a second plot or other incidentals. And if it involves Gail’s ridiculous poetry, all the better. " The episode received a 1.1 rating and was watched by a total of 2.26 million people. This made it the fourth most watched show on Animation Domination that night, losing to American Dad!, The Simpsons and Family Guy with 4.02 million.
