= Wharf Horse (or How Bob Saves/Destroys the Town – Part I) =

- Bob's Burgers episode
- Episode no.: Season 4 Episode 21
- Directed by: Brian Loschiavo
- Written by: Nora Smith
- Production code: 4ASA09
- Original air date: May 11, 2014

Guest appearances
- Zach Galifianakis as Felix; Bill Hader as Mickey; Jordan Peele as Fanny

Episode chronology
← Previous "Gene It On"	Next → "World Wharf II: The Wharfening (or How Bob Saves/Destroys the Town – Part II)"
- Bob's Burgers season 4

"Wharf Horse (or How Bob Saves/Destroys the Town – Part I)" is the 21st episode of the fourth season of the animated comedy series Bob's Burgers and the overall 66th episode, and is written by Nora Smith and directed by Brian Loschiavo. It aired on Fox in the United States on May 11, 2014.

== Plot ==
The episode opens with the Belcher children trying to give out flyers of the restaurant in front of Wonder Wharf. They see the owner and their landlord Calvin Fischoeder giving out free tickets of his own to attract customers, but to no avail. The Belcher children ditch the flyers and go inside the amusement park, where they find out that several of the rides were being replaced, specifically Tina's favorite carousel with odd-looking horses in it (such as what Tina calls "Mr. Goiter").

Meanwhile, Mr. Fischoeder's brother Felix visits Bob at the restaurant. He persuades Bob into influencing his older brother into selling the amusement park in order for them to build high-end condominiums, promising Bob that he will give him space for his own restaurant at the venue. While Linda is enthusiastic about the idea of earning more money, Bob has doubts. He is eventually convinced and proceeds to take Mr. Fischoeder to King's Head Island while Felix shows the contractors around Wonder Wharf.

Tina tries to stop the demolition of the carousel. Louise locks her to Mr. Goiter with a bike lock and makes Tina swallow the key so the demolition would halt. Back on King's Head Island, Bob successfully convinces Mr. Fischoeder to sell Wonder Wharf. When they get back to the amusement park, Calvin announces that he's selling the place. Bob's kids get mad at him, with Tina telling him that the Wonder Wharf is the heart of the town. Bob realizes his mistake, which was driven by his desire to have a bistro-style restaurant. He then convinces Mr. Fischoeder to undo his decision. After talking to him, Calvin tells his brother that he will never sell the Wharf, which infuriates Felix. The episode ends with a cliffhanger—where Felix holds Calvin and Bob at gunpoint, intending to kill the both of them to be able to inherit and consequently sell the amusement park.

== Reception ==
Alasdair Wilkins of The A.V. Club gave the episode a B+, saying "Throughout, “Wharf Horse (Or How Bob Saves/Destroys The Town—Part I)” feels like the show taking the biggest possible swing and trying to do something it’s never done before. This really is the perfect time for that. At the end of a very successful fourth season and with its future as secure as it’s ever going to be, Bob’s Burgers is in a place where it can step outside its normal structure and experiment with a slightly more dramatic form of storytelling." Robert Ham of Paste gave the episode a 10 out of 10, saying "How Bob’s Burgers achieved perfection tonight was by connecting all of its strengths to make one Voltron-like whole. All the throwaway lines from the characters were sharp and funny (Eugene, about to ride a roller coaster for the first time: “I’m going to die and I never got to see Hall & Oates!”). They weaved in musical elements in ways that never felt corny or distracting, not even Tina’s heartfelt “Goodbye, Mr. Goiter … I love you so much!” And the performances by all the voice talent were spot on, especially Jon Benjamin’s ability to convey so many different sides of Bob with the slightest inflection and Galifianakis as the mentally unhinged Felix."

The episode received a 0.9 rating and was watched by a total of 1.97 million people. This made it the fourth most watched show on Animation Domination that night, losing to American Dad!, The Simpsons and Family Guy with 4.16 million.
