= The Kids Rob a Train =

- Bob's Burgers episode
- Episode no.: Season 4 Episode 15
- Directed by: Boohwan Lim; Kyounghee Lim
- Written by: Steven Davis; Kelvin Yu
- Production code: 4ASA01
- Original air date: March 30, 2014

Guest appearances
- Brian Huskey as Regular Sized Rudy; Matt Walsh as Rick; Michael Showalter as Ethan; Lindsey Stoddart as Mandy

Episode chronology
← Previous "Uncle Teddy"	Next → "I Get Psy-chic Out of You"
- Bob's Burgers season 4

"The Kids Rob a Train" is the 15th episode of the fourth season of the animated comedy series Bob's Burgers and the overall 60th episode, and is written by Steven Davis and Kelvin Yu and directed by Boohwan Lim and Kyounghee Lim. It aired on Fox in the United States on March 30, 2014.

== Plot ==
Bob and Linda sign up for a wine tasting on a train. The kids are forced to stay in the back car, a miserable kids' room called the "Juice Caboose" with their classmate, Regular Sized Rudy, who is there because his dad takes his online dates there every weekend. The train ride is four hours and the attendant, Ethan, only unlocks the door once an hour to give them juice boxes. Knowing there is a chocolate dipping fountain, the kids hatch a plan to steal the kitchen's chocolate.

They distract Ethan so Louise can climb under the cart and be wheeled all the way to the kitchen car at the front of the train. They also tell Ethan that today is Linda's birthday so the entire staff will leave to present her with a birthday cheesecake. With the kitchen empty, Louise steals all the chocolate, puts it in a bag, and jumps off the slow-speed train to run alongside to the back car, where Rudy, Tina, and Gene will pull her in through the car's bathroom window. However, the plan goes astray when the chef forces his way into the bathroom and the kids are unable to meet up with Louise. Once he leaves, the kids try to pull Louise in, but all fall out of the window. They manage to climb back in, but Ethan is about to deliver the juice boxes and they have nowhere to hide the chocolate. Alerted to the disappearance of the chocolate, both Ethan and the chef search the car, but can find nothing; Louise had hidden the chocolate on top of the car's roof hatch. The sun's heat begins to melt the chocolate, causing it to slowly rain down on the kids just as Ethan and the chef leave. The kids enjoy their spoils by dancing in and eating the chocolate rain.

Meanwhile, Bob and Linda are joined in their tasting by a pretentious "wine expert" named Rick, who belittles Bob and Linda's wine knowledge. At another table, Rudy's father has a rocky time with his date, who becomes less and less impressed with him as he reveals he is a single father and lied about his looks. Forcing Bob into a blindfolded wine tasting competition and easily beating him, Rick boasts that he can guess any wine and offers to let Bob win it all if he can accurately guess any wine Linda wants to pick. Bob is able to immediately identify it, but Rick cannot, stubbornly drinking several glasses before giving up. Bob announces that it is the wine from the spit bucket. Rick is revolted, and Linda gleefully states that she knew Bob would guess it, because he drank from one at another wine bar on a bet from Linda the previous night. Bob taunts Rick about how he drank spit, causing Rick to throw wine on him and start a "wine fight". Amidst the chaos, Rudy's father admits to his date that he has been having a difficult time getting back into the dating scene and she forgives him, splashing him with wine and giving him a kiss.

At the end of the ride, the Belchers meet up, covered in chocolate and wine, as Ethan realizes that the kids had indeed stolen the chocolate and angrily shouts at them from the departing train.

== Reception ==
Pilot Viruet of The A.V. Club gave the episode a B+, saying "The Kids Rob a Train" lays out everything right there in the title. But it’s still a surprisingly tense episode, even though the children are never in any real danger. It reminds me of "Fort Night," the great Halloween episode with crazy Millie. The kids were never going to die that night, and they're not going to get hurt trying to jump back onto the train. But Bob's Burgers manages to create suspense in both episodes while still being very, very funny." Robert Ham of Paste gave the episode an 8.3 out of 10, saying "Shame that the episode didn't just stick with the adults as the whole train robbery bit with the kids wasn't all that exciting. The three gang up with Regular-Sized Rudy who is stuck in the juice caboose while his dad is on a date to liberate the bars of chocolate from the front of the train. It's a deeply silly idea and seemed, as ever, just an excuse for the kids to toss off as many weird asides as they could. Though a success in that regard, I probably laughed less at this episode than any of the 14 that preceded it. A better batting average than most sitcoms, to be sure, but a slight disappointment for one of TV’s finest half-hours."

The episode received a 1.0 rating and was watched by a total of 2.26 million people. This made it the fourth most watched show on Animation Domination that night, losing to American Dad!, The Simpsons, and Family Guy with 4.17 million.
