= Mazel-Tina =

- Bob's Burgers episode
- Episode no.: Season 4 Episode 13
- Directed by: Brian Loschiavo
- Written by: Holly Schlesinger
- Production code: 4ASA03
- Original air date: March 16, 2014

Guest appearances
- Jenny Slate as Tammy; Julie Klausner as Tammy's Mom; David Herman as Tammy's Dad; Brooke Dillman as Janet; Bobby Tisdale as Zeke

Episode chronology
← Previous "The Frond Files"	Next → "Uncle Teddy"
- Bob's Burgers season 4

"Mazel-Tina" is the 13th episode of the fourth season of the animated comedy series Bob's Burgers and the overall 58th episode, and is written by Holly Schlesinger and directed by Brian Loschiavo. It aired on Fox in the United States on March 16, 2014.

== Plot ==
Tina does not make the cut on the guestlist for Tammy's Bat Mitzvah, but gets to attend as part of the catering staff when Bob and the family are hired for the event, where she is still excited about the prospect of scoping out the boys from other schools who will be there. When Louise convinces the party coordinator, Janet, to quit, Tammy enlists Tina to fill in as her coordinator. Tina helps an ungrateful Tammy follow the schedule and navigate her various family members.

Meanwhile, the rest of the Belchers attempt to stay at their catering post, but are gradually each seduced away by the variety of other foods being offered. Bob and Linda in particular become so caught up that they find themselves at a wedding reception in the same venue.

While inspecting a faulty light in the interior of a large, hollow, light-up replica of Tammy's head, Tammy catches Louise in the act of trying to pour guacamole out the nose of the replica head, causing Louise to accidentally drop the headset in the bowl of guacamole, and both Tammy and Louise become trapped inside when the head is hoisted above the stage. After unclogging the headset, in a fit of rage, Louise secretly turns her headset off in response to Tammy's nasty attitude, pretending they're still clogged, leaving them unable to communicate with Tina or anyone else to let them know where they are. Following Tammy's previous order to keep the party moving no matter what, Tina takes Tammy's place in the Bat Mitzvah activities, receiving congratulations from Tammy's family and friends (who begin calling her "other Tammy"), reading from the Torah, and leading the dances. Tammy becomes dismayed when she realizes that her nasty behavior and attitude has resulted in her family and friends not noticing or caring that she is missing. Louise helps her realize that she's been a "terrible Bat-zilla" and eventually reveals the headset is unclogged, but demands that Tammy invite Tina to all her future parties.

Tammy agrees, but when the girls contact Tina, she ignores them in order to stay in the spotlight. Tammy and Louise manage to break through the bottom of the replica just as Tina leads the ladies' choice dance with the most popular boy at the party. Tina apologizes to Tammy, but tells her that she now understands why she acted so obnoxious: being the center of attention is intoxicating. Tammy is momentarily pleased that someone else understands her, but is incensed again when Tina thanks her for coming to her Bat Mitzvah. Before Tammy can attack her, Tina calls everyone to dance the Hora and the party goers lift a furious Tammy into the air. The Belchers meet up and exit the party as Tina wishes Tammy a happy Bat Mitzvah.

== Reception ==
Pilot Viruet of The A.V. Club gave the episode a A−, saying "It's one of those episodes where the events, while funny, pale in comparison to the wonderful little character moments: Louise showing how much she cares about her sister but not going totally soft (she is mostly indifferent to Tammy's upset cries); Tina understanding her selfish and obsessive actions; the entire family continuing to accept whatever silly traits the rest of them have." Robert Ham of Paste gave the episode an 8.6 out of 10, saying "There's much to love about the Belcher children on Bob's Burgers. Heck, they are 2/3rds of the reason many people I know keep tuning in every week. But what really strikes me in episodes like tonight's is how indefatigable they are. All three may be social pariahs with weird habits and attitudes, but they never let their lack of friends or good fortune get them down for very long."

The episode received a 1.1 rating and was watched by a total of 2.44 million people. This made it the fourth most watched show on Animation Domination that night, losing to American Dad!, The Simpsons, and Family Guy with 4.62 million.

"Mazel-Tina" was submitted for consideration for the Outstanding Animated Program at the 66th Primetime Creative Arts Emmy Awards, and was one of the five nominees. Bob's Burgers won the Emmy, their first win in three nominations ("Burgerboss" and "O.T.: The Outside Toilet" were also nominated).
