= A River Runs Through Bob =

- Bob's Burgers episode
- Episode no.: Season 4 Episode 1
- Directed by: Jennifer Coyle
- Written by: Dan Fybel; Rich Rinaldi
- Production code: 3ASA11
- Original air date: September 29, 2013

Guest appearances
- David Herman as Troop Leader; John Michael Higgins as RV Guy; Lindsey Stoddart as RV Lady

Episode chronology
← Previous "The Unnatural"	Next → "Fort Night"
- Bob's Burgers season 4

"A River Runs Through Bob" is the first episode of the fourth season of the animated comedy series Bob's Burgers and the overall 46th episode, and is written by Dan Fybel and Rich Rinaldi and directed by Jennifer Coyle. It aired on Fox in the United States on September 29, 2013.

== Plot ==
To make up for Tina missing her Thunder Girls troop camping trip due to being sick, Bob takes the reluctant family camping in the woods. Once they get there, they meet a survivalist couple camping next to them who offer them supplies. Bob zealously intends to live off the land and fishes for a trout, while the rest of the family, much less impressed, borrow food supplies from their neighbors for dinner. Later that night, Bob and Linda make use of a small hot spring, but are swept away by the river it is attached to after the rock enclosure around the spring collapses. They wash ashore far down the river, naked and lost, and Bob becomes violently sick from the trout he caught and ate earlier. Linda takes charge, demonstrating surprising aptitude in the wilderness, but Bob stubbornly ignores her, insisting on his own skill at wilderness survival.

In the morning, the kids wake to find Bob and Linda missing and borrow some inner tubes and a "survivalist guide" from their neighbors in order to search for their parents. Tina attempts to follow the Thunder Girls guidebook, but Louise and Gene find the Survivalist Guide much more compelling. At nightfall, Bob and Linda continue to follow the river back to the campsite, while Tina, Gene, and Louise come upon a Thunder Girl troupe campfire. However, Tina defiantly renounces her Thunder Girl membership, quoting from the Survivalist Guide about how such organizations are "cookie selling machines". Bob and Linda make it back to the campsite, with Bob finally praising Linda for her excellent wilderness skills and dubbing her the "Nature Master".

The neighbor couple tell them the kids are in the trailer. It turns out to be a trick, and the couple tells them they have been living in the woods for 40 months and want Bob and Linda to join them. They trap them in the trailer, and Linda attempts to escape by asking to use the trailer bathroom. The kids return to camp and see Bob and Linda are being held hostage. Using the Survivalist Guide, they "weaponize" bees by using Tina's Thunder Girl sash to drop a bee hive through the trailer roof vent. In the chaos of the bee attack, Bob and Linda are able to escape the trailer and the Belchers flee in their car back to the city. Tina finds her combination of Survivalist and Thunder Girls skills helped her save her parents, and re-envisions herself as a "Thundervivalist".

== Reception ==
Pilot Viruet from The A.V. Club gave the episode B−, saying "A River Runs Through Bob" was pretty funny and a nice welcome back to the show, but really, I'm just waiting to see the family out of the woods and back home." Robert Ham of Paste gave the episode an 8.2 out of 10, saying "Watching this new episode after The Simpsons only served to highlight how similar the two sitcoms are in their core ideas, but how Bob's Burgers skewers the conventions in ways that the show before it (and most definitely the shows after it) are unable to do. Bob's throws witty pop culture references into each episode—the John & Yoko Rolling Stone cover nod when Bob & Linda wake in the woods was particularly nice. The rest shove them so far down the viewers throats, it's a wonder we all don't gag involuntarily as we watch. Each have their charms, but Bob's Burgers is standing head and shoulders above the animation competition. As this episode proved, the fifth season was earned, and I can't wait to see where they take us next."

The episode received a 2.2 rating and was watched by a total of 4.48 million people. This made it the third most watched show on Animation Domination that night, beating American Dad! but losing to Family Guy with 5.23 million and The Simpsons with 6.37 million.
