= The Equestranauts =

- Bob's Burgers episode
- Bob disguised as an "Equesticle" at a pony cartoon convention.
- Episode no.: Season 4 Episode 17
- Directed by: Tyree Dillihay
- Written by: Dan Mintz
- Production code: 4ASA05
- Original air date: April 13, 2014

Guest appearances
- Kurt Braunohler as Sunpuddle; Paul F. Tompkins as Bronconius; Ron Funches as Horseplay; David Herman as Pony Danza

Episode chronology
| ← Previous "I Get Psy-chic Out of You" | Next → "Ambergris" |
- Bob's Burgers season 4

"The Equestranauts" is the 17th episode of the fourth season of the American animated television series Bob's Burgers, and the 62nd episode overall. It was written by Dan Mintz and directed by Tyree Dillihay, and was released on April 13, 2014. Parodying the "brony" fanbase of the animated children's cartoon My Little Pony: Friendship Is Magic, the episode's plot centers on Tina discovering her favorite animated pony cartoon has a fanbase of adult men, one of whom tricks Tina out of her rare toy pony, forcing Bob to go undercover and try to get it back.

== Plot ==
Tina, Gene, Louise, and Linda visit an "Equestra Con" convention based on Tina's favorite animated show, The Equestranauts, based on a toyline of pony dolls. Bob refuses to attend, disregarding it as being exclusive to young girls, but is told by Teddy that it is actually a meeting ground for a subculture of adult male fans of the series who call themselves "Equesticles" because "they have testicles." Tina is surprised to find that all the convention's attendants are middle-aged men wearing horse costumes, and feels out of place among them. She encounters a group of Equesticles led by a superfan who calls himself Bronconius, and befriends them over their shared interest in the series. Noticing Tina's "Chariot" pony doll, Bronconius coaxes her into trading it for a new toy, and promptly leaves. Louise overhears him gloating over the swindle and tells Tina about it.

The Belchers learn online that Tina's Chariot doll is a collectible with a rare camel toe defect. Tina devises a plan for Bob to steal the doll back by disguising himself as an Equesticle nicknamed "Bobcephala" and infiltrating Bronconius' circle of fans, to which Bob reluctantly agrees. In order to convince the fans of his disguise, she has Bob studiously review every Equestranauts episode and book to ensure his complete knowledge of the series. At the convention, Bob impresses Bronconius with his display of Equestranauts trivia, and begins to partake in various Equesticle activities with the group, such as face-painting, eating from a trough, and getting drunk on cocktails the fans call "horse medicine." Meanwhile, Tina looks through Bob's studying material to discover that it includes her self-written Equestranauts fan fiction that is non-canonical to the series, and realizes that Bob will ruin his cover if he brings it up.

At a hotel after-party, Bronconius shows Bob a safe where the Chariot doll is kept, and tells Bob his intent to achieve immortality by "merging mouths" with the doll. Bob openly recalls a zombie character from Tina's fan fiction as if that were canon, exposing him to Bronconius as a pretender to the fandom. Bob's family arrives to rescue Bob as Bronconius prepares to give Bob a large tattoo on his back in the shape of a horse with his own face on its posterior. Bronconius sets the other Equesticles on the family, but Tina turns them against him by arguing that he is using their core value of acceptance to achieve his own ends. As Bronconius gloats that they still won't be able to recover the doll, Bob then abruptly calls the front desk to open the safe. However, Tina decides she has outgrown the doll and packs it away, thanking Bob for retrieving it anyway. Angered that his whole fandom ordeal (which resulted in a small, nondescript, unfinished tattoo which remains for the rest of the series) may have been for nothing, Bob orders Tina to play with the doll before she goes to bed.

== Reception ==
Alasdair Wilkins of The A.V. Club gave the episode an A, saying it "offers a master class in the careful construction and destruction of its absurd scenario, and this is a feat that takes considerable skill. After all, such intentional undercutting of the story could backfire, especially with a premise like tonight's." He also praised the episode's knowledge of the My Little Pony fandom, writing, "[This] real-world counterpart feels less like a target for mockery and more like an inspiration for affectionate parody and a jumping-off point for something far stranger." Robert Ham of Paste gave the episode a 9.8, writing "Maybe I don't watch enough TV because I have to wonder what took a series this long to mock the brony phenomenon [...]. Well, the wait was worth it because Bob's Burgers damn near excoriated it."

The episode received a 0.8 rating and was watched by a total of 1.83 million people. This made it the fourth most watched show on Animation Domination that night behind American Dad!, The Simpsons, and Family Guy with 4.39 million.
