= Turkey in a Can =

- Bob's Burgers episode
- Episode no.: Season 4 Episode 5
- Directed by: Boohwan Lim; Kyounghee Lim
- Written by: Lizzie Molyneux; Wendy Molyneux
- Production code: 3ASA16
- Original air date: November 24, 2013

Guest appearances
- Andy Kindler as Mort; Megan Mullally as Gayle; Tuc Watkins as Butcher

Episode chronology
← Previous "My Big Fat Greek Bob"	Next → "Purple Rain-Union"
- Bob's Burgers season 4

"Turkey in a Can" is the fifth episode of the fourth season of the animated comedy series Bob's Burgers and the overall 50th episode, and is written by Lizzie Molyneux and Wendy Molyneux and directed by Boohwan Lim and Kyounghee Lim. It aired on Fox in the United States on November 24, 2013.

== Plot ==
Bob is excited about a three-day brine recipe for the Thanksgiving turkey, but the holiday becomes complicated for a couple of reasons:

- 1.) Tina keeps insisting to sit at the adults' table this year, to Bob and Linda's refusal.
- 2.) Linda's sister, Gayle, is staying with the Belchers for the holiday and she's bringing her pet cats. Bob, who's allergic to cats, begins taking allergy medication to combat his allergies.

The next morning, Bob finds his turkey dumped in the toilet. Furious, Bob scolds everyone, but the family insist that none of them did it. Meanwhile, Gene tries to write a "Thanksgiving carol" and enlists his mom and aunt to help him sing it. In an attempt to be considered adult enough to sit at the adult's table, Tina begins dressing more maturely and using what she perceives to be sophisticated catch phrases on adult topics, such as the economy and current events. The next morning, Bob is horrified to find his second turkey in the toilet again and no one steps forward.

In order to do a one-day brine, Bob goes to purchase two turkeys, one to serve as a decoy for the turkey saboteur and one to be the real turkey. The butcher mistakes Bob's return as an excuse to see him. He tells Bob that he has a boyfriend, but tells him not to let his rejection discourage him, offering to set him up with his friend, who's into "sloppy bears." As Bob prepares the two turkeys, he describes his plan to Linda: the decoy turkey will be in the apartment fridge, but the real turkey will be hidden in the restaurant fridge. He swears her to secrecy, so that the turkey "terrorist" won't know. Bob also decides to hide in the kitchen, staying up late in order to catch the culprit, but falls asleep at midnight. The next morning, Bob finds both turkeys in the toilet. Bob is convinced Linda, the only other person to know of the two turkeys, is the saboteur, but Linda swears it was not her and the family reveals that Linda blabbed about the two turkeys, making all of them potential suspects once again.

Bob is determined not to let the culprit prevent him from cooking a turkey and purchases one more at the grocery store. The butcher once again mistakes this for Bob's affection toward him, and breaks down, stating that things with his boyfriend, Tony, haven't been good for a long time and that perhaps he is indeed ready for a change. He excitedly asks Bob where he wants to go for a date, but Bob, flustered, tells him that he's "straight...well, mostly straight" and not romantically interested in him, but that even if he was, the butcher is way out of his league. Bob runs away, saying that he probably won't see him tomorrow, but that he'll call him. Tina continues to try to win her way into the adults' table, while Bob successfully cooks the turkey in time for dinner. Before dinner starts, Gayle and Linda sing their sexually euphemistic Thanksgiving carol, but Bob, exhausted from staying up late, falls asleep and begins sleepwalking with the turkey. The family follows him, where he takes the turkey into the toilet, referring to the turkey as Tina, and trying to potty train it, causing it to fall into the toilet.

The mystery is then revealed: a side-effect of the cat allergy pills is sleepwalking. Bob's accrued anxieties over Tina growing up so quickly manifested as him taking the turkeys in his sleep, and trying to relive potty training Tina when she was an infant... just as he had potty trained all the kids when they were little. Tina assures her father that even though she's getting older, she'll always be his little girl, then the entire family hugs.

The following night, Bob begins sleepwalking again, this time reliving potty training when Gene was an infant, and putting one of Gayle's cats in the toilet.

== Reception ==
Pilot Viruet of The A.V. Club gave the episode A−, saying "While the overarching turkey mystery is funny and creative, the best parts of "Turkey In A Can" are within the smaller stories, the throwaway conversations, and bits of character growth." Robert Ham of Paste gave the episode a 9.6 out of 10, saying "This episode is as close to a perfect as this show has come up this season. The family gets plenty of time to play off of one another, the jokes are quick and sharp, and it all wraps up not with some boring lesson being imparted by one character to another, but in some simple human truth about parents and their young kids. As well, it is evidence that strengthens the case that Bob’s Burgers is the best sitcom on TV right now."

The episode received a 1.9 rating and was watched by a total of 4.08 million people. This made it the fourth most watched show on Animation Domination that night, losing to American Dad!, Family Guy and The Simpsons with 6.78 million.
