= Scott Jacobson =

American screenwriter (born 1977)

Scott Jacobson (born 1977) is an American comedy writer and winner of four Emmys for contributions to The Daily Show with Jon Stewart and two Emmys for contributions to Bob's Burgers. He is currently a writer on Fox's animated show Bob's Burgers and has also written for The Academy Awards, Robert Smigel's TV Funhouse cartoons, and the Adult Swim show Squidbillies. He grew up in North Carolina, where he attended the North Carolina School of Science and Mathematics and the University of North Carolina in Chapel Hill.

Jacobson has also directed music videos for The National, Dinosaur Jr., Nick Lowe, Superchunk, The Fiery Furnaces, Eleanor Friedberger, Rebecca Schiffman, Hospitality, Stephen Malkmus and the Jicks, among others.
