= Bob's Burgers season 6 =

Bob's Burgers
- Season 6
- DVD cover
- No. of episodes: 19

Release
- Original network: Fox
- Original release: September 27, 2015 – May 22, 2016

Season chronology
- ← Previous; Season 5 Next → Season 7

The sixth season of the animated comedy series Bob's Burgers began airing on Fox in the United States on September 27, 2015, and concluded on May 22, 2016. The season contained 19 episodes.

== Production ==
On January 8, 2015, the series was renewed for a sixth production cycle, which aired as part of the sixth broadcast season, which also included 13 holdover episodes from the fifth production cycle.

This season featured guest appearances from Steve Buscemi, Paul Rudd, Wanda Sykes, and Henry Winkler.

== Episodes ==
No. overall	No. in season	Title	Directed by	Written by	Original release date	Prod. code	U.S. viewers (millions)
89	1	"Sliding Bobs"	Don MacKinnon	Greg Thompson	September 27, 2015	5ASA10	2.51
After Bob notices that he is losing hair from his moustache, Linda tells how important his moustache was in their meeting. The kids then tell their own versions of how Bob and Linda would have met, if Bob didn't have a moustache at that time.
90	2	"The Land Ship"	Jennifer Coyle	Holly Schlesinger & H. Jon Benjamin	October 11, 2015	5ASA11	2.19
During the Land Ship parade, which Bob thinks will increase business of his restaurant, four port-a-potties are placed in front of it to his dismay. Meanwhile, after Tina's friends tell her that she is boring, she decides to join up with Jordan in vandalizing by spraying with graffiti.
91	3	"The Hauntening"	Jennifer Coyle	Steven Davis & Kelvin Yu	October 18, 2015	5ASA13	2.09
When Louise reveals that she has never been scared before, the Belchers visit a haunted house on Halloween in an attempt to scare her.
92	4	"Gayle Makin' Bob Sled"	Tyree Dillihay	Lizzie Molyneux & Wendy Molyneux	November 8, 2015	5ASA17	3.13
The Belchers' Thanksgiving festivities are put in jeopardy when Bob finds himself staying with an injured Aunt Gayle during a snowstorm.
93	5	"Nice-Capades"	Chris Song	Dan Fybel	November 15, 2015	5ASA18	2.27
When a grumpy mall Santa threatens to put Tina, Gene, and Louise on the "Naughty List", they try to convince him that they are nice by putting on an Ice Capades-style musical show at the mall's skating rink.
94	6	"The Cook, the Steve, the Gayle, & Her Lover"	Tyree Dillihay	Nora Smith	January 17, 2016	5ASA12	2.26
When Bob throws a dinner party to bond with his new friend, Gayle uses the opportunity to introduce the family to her new love interest. Little does she know, Louise has a long-standing feud with Gayle’s boyfriend and her niece will stop at nothing to break them apart. Calamity ensues as Bob attempts to impress his new buddy and the kids take action.
95	7	"The Gene and Courtney Show"	Chris Song	Rich Rinaldi	February 14, 2016	6ASA01	2.05
Gene and Courtney are asked to host the morning announcements, but their romantic history threatens to get in the way of their big break. Meanwhile, Tina's attempt to play Cupid at the Valentine's Day carnation fundraiser goes tragically awry.
96	8	"Sexy Dance Healing"	Chris Song & Bernard Derriman	Rich Rinaldi	February 21, 2016	5ASA15	2.29
Bob must take legal action after he slips on the sidewalk and needs to pay for surgery, and ends up under the care of Jairo, who attempts to heal him without a doctor. Meanwhile, Gene, Louise, and Tina create a fake law firm to settle their discrepancies towards each other.
97	9	"Sacred Couch"	Brian Loschiavo	Scott Jacobson	March 6, 2016	5ASA16	2.64
When Linda convinces the Belchers to not replace their old couch with a new one, Louise decides to take matters into her own hands.
98	10	"Lice Things Are Lice"	Brian Loschiavo	Greg Thompson	March 13, 2016	5ASA19	2.28
A head lice infestation breaks out in Wagstaff when Tina volunteers as a nurse. Meanwhile, Bob tries to make improvements to the new bar stool seats in his restaurant.
99	11	"House of 1000 Bounces"	Tyree Dillihay	Mike Benner	April 3, 2016	5ASA20	2.05
When a bounce house crisis occurs during Regular-Sized Rudy's birthday party, Gene, Louise, and Tina must come to the rescue. Meanwhile, Bob tries to deal with his longstanding fear of pigeons after one shows up in his restaurant.
100	12	"Stand by Gene"	Tyree Dillihay	Jon Schroeder	April 3, 2016	5ASA14	1.99
Gene, Louise, Tina, and their friends go on a journey to look for a mythical creature that supposedly lives nearby. Meanwhile, during downtime at the restaurant, Linda's competitive nature sends her into overdrive.
101	13	"Wag the Hog"	Brian Loschiavo	Holly Schlesinger	April 10, 2016	5ASA22	2.35
The Belchers must help Bob's longtime friend, Critter, after he ends up in jail for unpaid parking tickets. Meanwhile, Linda gets a job at babysitting, but it ends up becoming more than she expected.
102	14	"The Hormone-iums"	Chris Song	Lizzie Molyneux & Wendy Molyneux	April 17, 2016	6ASA04	2.18
Tina gets her chance to be soloist of the Hormone-iums in a play, but realizes the role could end up ruining her social status. Meanwhile, Linda comes up with a business plan that she thinks will make the Belchers rich.
103	15	"Pro Tiki/Con Tiki"	Brian Loschiavo	Jon Schroeder	April 24, 2016	6ASA03	2.35
Bob's friend, Warren, comes to town and makes an offer to invest in the restaurant, which could use a much-needed makeover, but their decorating ideas do not go well with each other. Meanwhile, Gene gives up his bedroom to houseguest Warren.
104	16	"Bye Bye Boo Boo"	Tyree Dillihay	Scott Jacobson	May 8, 2016	6ASA05	2.31
After hearing that Boo Boo is leaving Boyz 4 Now, Louise enters a contest that could finally give Tina a chance to meet him. Meanwhile, Bob and Linda learn about a mobster who got shot in the restaurant in 1931, which causes tension between Bob and Jimmy Pesto.
105	17	"The Horse Rider-er"	Tyree Dillihay	Nora Smith	May 15, 2016	6ASA02	2.27
Tina finally gets to attend horse camp, but realizes she must part ways with her imaginary horse, Jericho. Meanwhile, Linda creates a restaurant camp in order to even things out between Gene and Louise.
106	18	"Secret Admiral-irer"	Brian Loschiavo	Holly Schlesinger & H. Jon Benjamin	May 22, 2016	6ASA06	2.23
Tina volunteers at a nursing home to earn her next Thunder Girls badge, where her ideas of love and romance are tested. Meanwhile, Bob makes new friends who lead him into making questionable decisions.
107	19	"Glued, Where's My Bob?"	Bernard Derriman	Steven Davis & Kelvin Yu	May 22, 2016	5ASA21	2.04
Gene, Louise, and Tina's goop war causes Bob to end up in a sticky situation, where he learns that a journalist is coming to the restaurant to do a story on it, and the whole town ends up getting involved.
