= Annie Award for Outstanding Achievement for Editorial in an Animated Television/Broadcast Production =

Annual US television award

Annie Award for Editorial in an Animated Television/Broadcast Production
- Awarded for: Excellence in animated --
- Country: United States
- Presented by: ASIFA-Hollywood
- First award: 2011
- Currently held by: Tony Christopherson, Joie Lim – Common Side Effects (2025)
- Website: annieawards.org

The Annie Award for Editorial in an Animated Television/Broadcast Production is an Annie Award given annually to the best editing in a television, or broadcast productions. It was first presented at the 39th Annie Awards with the name Best Editing in a Television Production, the name was changed to its current name the following year.

== Winners and nominees ==
=== 2010s ===
Year	Program	Episode(s)	Editor(s)	Network
2011 (39th)
2011 (39th)	The Penguins of Madagascar		Ted Machold, Jeff Adams, Doug Tiano, Bob Tomlin	Nickelodeon
2011 (39th)	Mary Shelley's Frankenhole	"Season 2"	Garret Elkins	Cartoon Network
2011 (39th)	Star Wars: The Clone Wars		Jason W.A. Tucker	Cartoon Network
2011 (39th)	Kung Fu Panda: Legends of Awesomeness		Hugo Morales, Davrick Waltjen, Adam Arnold, Otto Ferrene	Nickelodeon
2011 (39th)	Futurama		Paul D. Calder	Fox
2012 (40th)
2012 (40th)	Kung Fu Panda: Legends of Awesomeness	"Enter the Dragon"	Hugo Morales, Davrick Waeden, Adam Arnold, Otto Ferrene	Nickelodeon
2012 (40th)	Puss in Boots: The Three Diablos		Bret Marnell	DreamWorks Animation
2012 (40th)	Kung Fu Panda: Legends of Awesomeness	"Monkey in the Middle"	Hugo Morales, Davrick Waeden, Adam Arnold, Otto Ferrene	Nickelodeon
2012 (40th)	Robot and Monster	"Cheer Up Mr. Wheelie"	Chris Hink	Nickelodeon
2012 (40th)	Star Wars: The Clone Wars	"Revival"	Jason Tucker	Cartoon Network
2012 (40th)	Dragons: Riders of Berk	"Animal House"	Lynn Hobson	Cartoon Network
2012 (40th)	Sofia the First	"Once Upon a Princess"	Peiter Kaufman	Disney Channel / Disney Junior
2012 (40th)	Dan Vs.	"Monster Under the Bed"	Steffie Lucchesi, Matt Steinauer, Amy Blaisdell	The Hub
2013 (41st)
2013 (41st)	Mickey Mouse		Illya Owens	Disney Channel
2013 (41st)	Adventure Time		Paul Douglas	Cartoon Network
2013 (41st)	Star Wars: The Clone Wars		Jason W.A. Tucker	Cartoon Network
2013 (41st)	Dragons: Defenders of Berk		Lynn Hobson	Cartoon Network
2013 (41st)	Futurama		Paul D. Calder	Fox
2013 (41st)	Kung Fu Panda: Legends of Awesomeness		Adam Arnold, Hugo Morales, Davrick Waltjen	Nickelodeon
2013 (41st)	Teenage Mutant Ninja Turtles		Myra Lopez, Ana Adams, Justin Baker	Nickelodeon
2013 (41st)	Toy Story of Terror!		Axel Geddes, Kathy Graves, Chloe Kloezeman	ABC
2014 (42nd)
2014 (42nd)	Mickey Mouse		Illya Owens	Disney Channel
2014 (42nd)	Dragons: Defenders of Berk		Matamoros Ernesto	Cartoon Network
2014 (42nd)	Family Guy		Mike Elias	Fox
2014 (42nd)	Toy Story That Time Forgot		David Suther, Bradley Furnish, David Condolora	ABC
2014 (42nd)	Turbo Fast		Todd Raleigh, Doug Vito	Netflix
2015 (43rd)
2015 (43rd)	Mickey Mouse	"Coned"	Illya Owens	Disney Channel
2015 (43rd)	All Hail King Julien	"Body Double"	David Craig, Jeff Adams	Netflix
2015 (43rd)	Dragons: Race to the Edge	"Dragon Eye of the Beholder, Part 1"	John Laus	Netflix
2015 (43rd)	Star vs. the Forces of Evil	"Storm the Castle"	Ted Supa	Disney XD
2015 (43rd)	Elf: Buddy's Musical Christmas		Mike Wright	NBC
2015 (43rd)	Lost Treasure Hunt	"Columbus Voyage Revisited"	Nolan Southerland, William Kessler, Benjamin Rush	Argosy Film Group
2015 (43rd)	Phineas and Ferb	"Last Day of Summer"	Anne Harting, Shawn LeMonnier, Lauren Crist, Carmen Woods	Disney Channel/ Disney XD
2016 (44th)
2016 (44th)	Mickey Mouse	"Sock Burglar"	Illya Owens	Disney Channel
2016 (44th)	All Hail King Julien	"King Julien Superstar!"	David Craig, Jeff Adams	Netflix
2016 (44th)	Bob's Burgers	"Sea Me Now"	Mark Seymour, Chuck Smith, Eric Davidson	Fox
2016 (44th)	Gravity Falls	"Weirdmageddon 3: Take Back The Falls"	Kevin Locarro, Andrew Sorcini, Nancy Frazen, Tony Mizgalski	Disney XD
2016 (44th)	Star Wars Rebels	"Twilight of the Apprentice"	Joe E. Elwood, Alex McDonnell	Disney XD
2017 (45th)
2017 (45th)	Samurai Jack	"Episodes XCIII, XCIV & XCIX"	Paul Douglas	Adult Swim
2017 (45th)	Bob's Burgers	"Bob Actually"	Mark Seymour, Chuck Smith, Eric Davidson	Fox
2017 (45th)	BoJack Horseman	"Stupid Piece of Sh*t"	Jose Martinez	Netflix
2017 (45th)	Dinotrux	"Superchargers"	William Rinaldi, Justin Baker, Mary Hutson	Netflix
2017 (45th)	Pickle and Peanut	"Bear-I-cade"	John Royer	Disney XD
2018 (46th)
2018 (46th)	Big Hero 6: The Series		Charles Jones, Joe Molinari, Dao Le, Vartan Nazarian, David Vazquez	Disney Channel
2018 (46th)	SpongeBob SquarePants		Estrella Miyakawa Capin, Christopher Hink, Bob Tomlin, Rick Dominicus	Nickelodeon
2018 (46th)	3Below: Tales of Arcadia		John Laus, Graham Fisher	Netflix
2018 (46th)	The Epic Tales of Captain Underpants		Steve Downs, John Wall, Adam Smith, Collin Erker	Netflix
2018 (46th)	Puppy Dog Pals		Adam Rickabus	Disney Junior
2019 (47th)
2019 (47th)	Love, Death & Robots	"Alternate Histories"	Bo Juhl, Stacy Auckland, Valerian Zamel	Netflix
2019 (47th)	Big Hero 6: The Series	"Prey Date"	Dao Le, Joe Molinari, Charles T. Jones, David Vasquez	Disney Channel
2019 (47th)	Mickey Mouse	"Carried Away"	Tony Molina	Disney Channel
2019 (47th)	DC Super Hero Girls	"#AdventuresInBunnysitting"	Torien Blackwolf	Cartoon Network
2019 (47th)	Green Eggs and Ham	"Mouse"	Margaret Hou	Netflix

=== 2020s ===
Year	Program	Episode(s)	Editor(s)	Network
2020 (48th)
2020 (48th)	Hilda	"The Deerfox"	John McKinnon	Netflix
2020 (48th)	Lamp Life		Serena Warner	Disney+
2020 (48th)	Cops and Robbers		Brandon Terry, Ezra Dweck, Terilyn A. Shropshire, Del Spiva, Greg Hedgepath	Netflix
2020 (48th)	If Anything Happens I Love You		Peter Ettinger, Michael Babcock	Netflix
2020 (48th)	To: Gerard		James Ryan	DreamWorks Animation
2021 (49th)
2021 (49th)	What If...?	"What If... Ultron Won?"	Joel Fisher, Graham Fisher, Sharia Davis, Basuki Juwono, Adam Spieckerman	Disney+
2021 (49th)	Amphibia	"True Colors"	Jennifer Calbi, Julie Anne Lau, Yoonah Yim, Andrew Sorcini, David Vasquez	Disney Channel
2021 (49th)	Arlo the Alligator Boy		Steve Downs	Netflix
2021 (49th)	Love, Death + Robots	"Pop Squad"	Julian Clarke, Matt Mariska, Valerian Zamel, Brian Swanson, Ky Kenyon	Netflix
2021 (49th)	Tom and Jerry in New York	"Billboard Jumble"	Michael D'Ambrosio, Jeff Small	HBO Max
2022 (50th)
2022 (50th)	The Boy, the Mole, the Fox and the Horse		Daniel Budin	Apple TV+
2022 (50th)	Amphibia	"All In"	Andrew Sorcini, Yoonah Yim, Jennifer Calbi, Julie Anne Lau, Louis Russell	Disney Channel
2022 (50th)	Green Eggs and Ham	"The Sam Who Came In From the Cold"	Margaret Hou	Netflix
2022 (50th)	Karma's World	"Keys, The Inventor"	Damien Dunne, Ultan Murphy, Emma O'Brien, Fred O'Connor, Aiden McKenna	Netflix
2022 (50th)	Star Trek: Lower Decks	"The Stars at Night"	Andy Maxwell, Zach Lamplugh, Brandon Brocker, Paul Mazzotta	Paramount+
2023 (51st)
2023 (51st)	Blue Eye Samurai	"The Tale of the Ronin and the Bride"	Yuka Shirasuna	Netflix
2023 (51st)	Hilda	"Chapter 6: The Forgotten Lake"	John Mckinnon, Mike Stefanelli	Netflix
2023 (51st)	I Am Groot	"Groot's Snow Day"	Dan Urrutia	Disney+
2023 (51st)	Star Wars: Visions	"Screecher's Reach"	Richie Cody, ACE, BFE	Disney+
2023 (51st)	The Legend of Vox Machina	"The Sunken Tomb"	Todd Raleigh	Amazon Prime Video
2024 (52nd)
2024 (52nd)	Arcane	"Pretend Like It's the First Time"	Nazim Meslem, Gilad Carmel, Roberto Fernandez	Netflix
2024 (52nd)	Creature Commandos	"Cheers to the Tin Man"	Annie De Brock	Max
2024 (52nd)	Jurassic World: Chaos Theory	"Batten Down the Hatches"	Ben Choo, Rich Liverance, Eric Hendricks, Anna Adams, Ian Hurley	Netflix
2024 (52nd)	Marvel's Moon Girl and Devil Dinosaur	"The Molecular Level"	Sandra Powers, Phil Lomboy, Ryan Burkhard, Neil Wilson III, Gabriel Gelbrecht	Disney Channel
2024 (52nd)	Tales of the Teenage Mutant Ninja Turtles	"The Pearl"	Caleb Yoder	Paramount+
2025 (53rd)
2025 (53rd)	Common Side Effects	"Raid"	Tony Christopherson, Joie Lim	Adult Swim
2025 (53rd)	Asterix and Obelix: The Big Fight	"Episode III"	David Boyadjian	Netflix
2025 (53rd)	Haunted Hotel	"The Acolytes of Abaddon"	Benjamin Morse, Benjamin Martian, Marshall Wetta	Netflix
2025 (53rd)	Invincible	"I Thought You'd Never Shut Up"	Luke Asa Guidici, Matt Michael, Lea Carosella, Liam Johnson	Amazon Prime Video
2025 (53rd)	Tom Clancy's Splinter Cell: Deathwatch	"Up From the Grave"	Thomas Belair, Nicolas Bourgeois, Julien Perez	Netflix

== See also ==
- American Cinema Editors Award for Best Edited Animation (Non-Theatrical)
