= The Cook, the Steve, the Gayle, & Her Lover =

- Bob's Burgers episode
- Episode no.: Season 6 Episode 6
- Directed by: Tyree Dillihay
- Written by: Nora Smith
- Production code: 5ASA12
- Original air date: January 17, 2016

Guest appearances
- Megan Mullally as Gayle; David Herman as Mr. Frond; Rob Huebel as Steve

Episode chronology
← Previous "Nice-Capades"	Next → "The Gene and Courtney Show"
- Bob's Burgers season 6

"The Cook, the Steve, the Gayle, & Her Lover" is the sixth episode of the sixth season of the animated comedy series Bob's Burgers and the overall 94th episode, written by Nora Smith and directed by Tyree Dillihay. It aired on Fox in the United States on January 17, 2016. When Bob throws a dinner party to bond with his new friend, Gayle uses the opportunity to introduce the family to her new love interest. Little does Gayle know, Louise, her niece has a long-standing feud with Gayle's date and will stop at nothing to break them apart. Calamity ensues as Bob attempts to impress his new buddy and the kids take action.

== Plot ==
Mr. Frond has Louise in his office to talk about the various items she has brought to disturb her class (the most recent being a shark head reacher/grabber tool). He uses a little doll to try and offer guidance counseling but Louise is not amused and gets detention and her grabber confiscated.

At the burger restaurant, Teddy is jealous that Bob is planning to invite his new "man crush" Steve and his klepto son, Zander, to a dinner party for Gayle and her new man (who she has been on two dates with). Bob is eager to try and impress Steve who is mainly trying to make new friends after his divorce, Tina is disappointed that Zander is not a cute teenage boy, and Louise is horrified when it turns out her aunt Gayle's mystery man is Mr. Frond.

While none of the Belchers like Mr. Frond, least of all Louise, Bob and Linda tell the kids not to ruin the longest relationship that Gayle has ever had (or Bob's chance to have a nice night with Steve). Louise attempts to badmouth him to Gayle but it doesn't work (she loves rules and high-strung people). When Louise finds a doll of her aunt in his bag, she hides his gift and tries to scare Aunt Gayle into dumping Mr. Frond with a badly translated song. A drunk Mr. Frond finds the doll gift missing and ends up in the bathroom upset and retching from too much wine.

After Linda threatens Louise with grounding and chores if she doesn't return the doll, the kids find the doll is missing from her hiding spot. Louise catches Zander with the doll and he ditches it in the sewer but after a stern look from Tina, Louise decides to rescue the doll using her grabber tool. Bob's evening with Steve took a bad turn as well when his cooking gives Steve gastric distress but luckily Teddy comes by, hears what happened, and after passionately defending Bob, he has them hug it out. They see Louise take out the doll, explain that it was a gift from Mr. Frond, and give the sewer-soaked doll to Gayle who takes it as a sign they were meant to be. She goes up to Mr. Frond and they make out, much to Louise's disgust.

== Reception ==
Alasdair Wilkins of The A.V. Club gave the episode an A−, saying, "“The Cook, The Steve, The Gayle, And Her Lover” is a fine way to kick off 2016, as the show keeps things nice and straightforward and focused on the Belchers. What's so fun about the show at this point in its comedic evolution is that it can do an unabashed Belcher episode that also heavily features two of the show's weirdest characters and two previously unseen people, one of whom is intentionally an incredibly boring non-entity, for all that Bob loves Steve so. At the end of the day, Bob's Burgers can always just go back home to the Belcher household and get laughs from having the characters bounce off of one another, especially when Louise and Bob are making fools of themselves in pursuit of what they want and the other three family members are content to just wisecrack. Well, at least until Tina had her climactic filibuster at the end there. Never before has the show been so eloquent." Sean Fitz-Gerald from Vulture gave the episode a positive review by saying, "It was, overall, the best welcome-back present viewers could ask for from Bob's, a tried-and-true premise that traipses into hilarious new territory. Love is at the forefront and all of the show's other strengths (wordplay, slightly blue humor, and timing) serve as strong reinforcement pillars."

The episode received a 1.0 rating and was watched by a total of 2.26 million people.
