= Nice-Capades =

- Bob's Burgers episode
- Episode no.: Season 6 Episode 5
- Directed by: Chris Song
- Written by: Dan Fybel
- Production code: 5ASA18
- Original air date: November 15, 2015

Guest appearances
- Kevin Kline as Calvin Fischoeder; Zach Galifianakis as Felix Fischoeder; Henry Winkler as Mall Santa; Jessica Lowe as Elf

Episode chronology
← Previous "Gayle Makin' Bob Sled"	Next → "The Cook, the Steve, the Gayle, & Her Lover"
- Bob's Burgers season 6

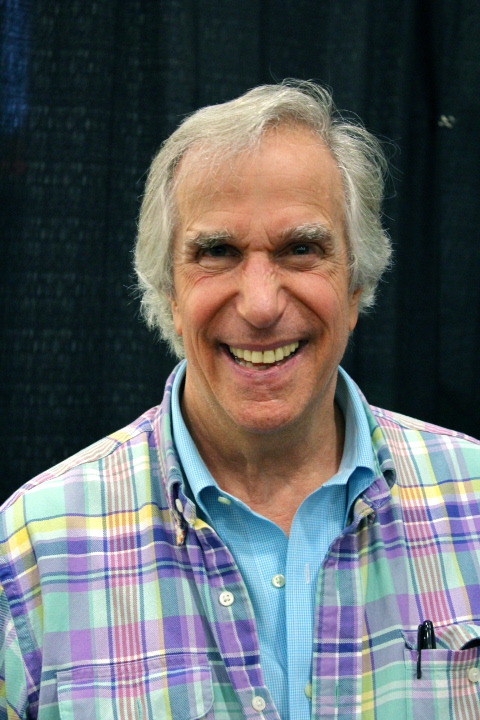
Henry Winkler (2013)

"Nice-Capades" is the fifth episode of the sixth season of the American comedy series Bob's Burgers and the 93rd episode overall. It was written by Dan Fybel and directed by Chris Song. Guest starring are Kevin Kline as Calvin Fischoeder, Zach Galifianakis as his brother Felix Fischoeder, Henry Winkler as a mall Santa and Jessica Lowe who voices an elf. It first aired in the United States on Fox on November 15, 2015. In this Christmas episode, the siblings Tina, Gene and Louise Belcher try to prove that they are good kids by performing an ice capades show in front of a mall Santa.

== Plot ==
A few days before Christmas the Belcher children want to use a massage chair in the mall but it is being used by a man. The kids force the man to leave, but he reveals that he is a mall Santa, and says that he will send his report about the children's behaviour to the real Santa Claus. After Louise has a nightmare about her and her siblings only getting coal for Christmas, she is worried that her bad dream will come true. The kids go to Santa's village in the mall to apologize to Santa. The first time, they are sent away by Santa's elf because they do not want a picture to be taken, and the second time Tina accidentally spills milk over Santa's coat, so they are forced to leave again.

Later they have the idea of doing an ice capades show named Nice-Capades on the mall's ice rink to impress Santa and singing about all the nice things they did that year. Louise asks Calvin Fischoeder to talk to the mall management so they can use the ice rink on Christmas Eve for the last half-hour before the mall closes. In return, Mr. Fischoeder wants to sing a song while his brother Felix does a figure skating performance, which Louise accepts. Gene writes the song the children want to sing, Linda makes costumes, and Teddy asks the other players of the Jewish ice hockey team which he is on for help during the show.

After the Fischoeder brothers do their performance, the kids are about to begin singing when they see that the mall Santa is gone. While the Fischoeders stave the audience off, Bob and Linda search the mall for Santa. They find him trying to get a present for his nephew, so Bob agrees to buy a present so that Santa has time to watch the children's show. First, Gene sings about how he gave Regular-sized Rudy the last taco during lunch at school, with Gene playing himself and Teddy playing Rudy. Next Tina sings about how she was on the beach, getting a horseshoe crab back into the ocean and later adopting it, with Tina playing herself and Teddy playing the crab. (In fact, she just kicked the animal back into the sea and never took it home.) Last, Louise begins singing about the many nice things she did, such as regrowing the rainforest or giving shoes to shoeless people. After she sees her reflection in the ice, she stops and tells Santa that all of her lyrics are a lie and that he should bring just her siblings presents, because they are good kids and she is not. Linda says that Louise is also a good kid who does nice things all the time. Her family tells her what nice things she does such as her constructive criticism on Tina's secret diary. Santa explains to her that she is a good person because she has a sense of right and wrong, and does not care about what she thinks of herself, but cares about what other people think of her. He asks her what she wishes for and she answers that she wants to have a pet shark. On Christmas morning she gets an aquarium with a gold fish instead, which disappoints her.

== Reception ==
Alasdair Wilkins of The A.V. Club gave the episode an "A" and wrote that Louise is "smart enough to realize that this random man at the mall isn’t actually Santa, yet she’s entirely capable of convincing herself that this guy could narc on her to the real Santa." He also noted that "when Louise isn’t the protagonist of an episode, she gets to be a pint-sized force of chaos. When she is the star, as she is tonight, she’s still a force, but we get the added fun of seeing her understanding of reality scrape against how things really are, as when her repeated attempts to get back in Santa’s good graces backfire because of the elf calling a Code Blitzen." The episode has "that emotional moment when she finally realizes what really matters here. The climactic moment when she catches sight of herself in the ice and recognizes there’s no point in lying about all the nice things she hasn’t done is a wonderfully affecting bit, because that vulnerability instantly turns her into a real little kid. The fact that she rages against reality so spectacularly makes her moments of acceptance all the more powerful—off the top of my head, the show had a similarly powerful moment at the end of last season’s “Hawk And Chick,” and this is more generally why Louise episodes tend to work particularly well."

== See also ==
- Ice Capades
- Ice-Capades
- Ice-Capades Revue
