= Teen-a Witch =

- Bob's Burgers episode
- Episode no.: Season 7 Episode 3
- Directed by: Chris Song
- Written by: Holly Schlesinger
- Production code: 6ASA13
- Original air date: October 23, 2016

Guest appearances
- Betsy Sodaro as Jackie; Billy Eichner as Mr. Ambrose; Kevin Kline as Mr. Fischoeder; Jay Johnston as Jimmy Pesto; David Herman as Mr. Frond; Jenny Slate as Tammy Larsen; Bobby Tisdale as Zeke

Episode chronology
| ← Previous "Sea Me Now" | Next → "They Serve Horses, Don't They?" |
- Bob's Burgers season 7

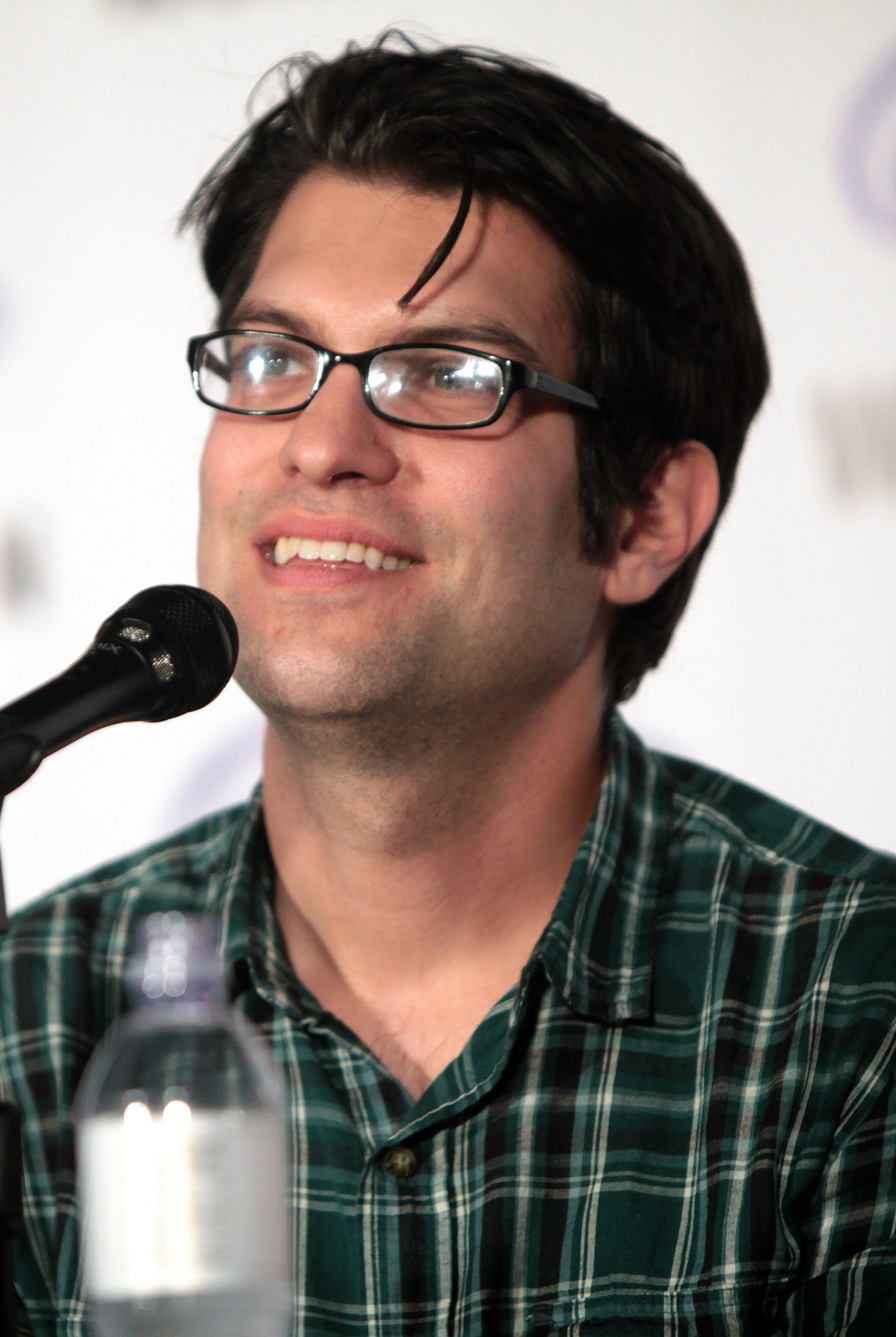
Dan Mintz voices Tina.

"Teen-a Witch" is the third episode of the seventh season of the American animated comedy series Bob's Burgers and the 110th episode overall. It was directed by Chris Song and written by Holly Schlesinger. Its guest stars are Betsy Sodaro as Jackie the crossing guard, Billy Eichner as Mr. Ambrose, Kevin Kline as Calvin Fischoeder, Jay Johnston as Jimmy Pesto, David Herman as Mr. Frond, Jenny Slate as Tammy Larsen and Bobby Tisdale as Zeke. It originally aired in the United States on Fox Network on October 23, 2016. In this Halloween episode, Tina Belcher thinks that she is a witch and casts spells on people, while Bob Belcher tries to find out who steals his jack-o'-lanterns.

== Plot ==
After Tammy overhears Tina's idea for the school's Halloween costume contest, she steals it and declares that it was always her idea, not Tina's. So Tina needs another idea to win. During lunch, she comes up with the idea of a "sand-witch" meaning a witch between two slices of bread. She goes to the school library to research witches and bread. The librarian Mr. Ambrose tells her that witches look like everyone else and that he is one. He says that Tina should be a witch, not just dress as one. He gives her a spell book for casting a spell in the contest to win it.

That night, Tina casts different spells including one to win the contest and a love spell on Jimmy Pesto Jr. After some of them to seem to work, she thinks that she actually is a witch. Tina starts to wear a black t-shirt and a black choker necklace and has a much bolder attitude. She also casts a spell on Jackie the crossing guard, but Jackie takes her barrette and places a curse on her. After Tina talks to Mr. Ambrose about the curse and he explains to her that Jackie is an evil witch (After leaving the Coven she and Ambrose were part of), she is afraid that something bad will happen during the costume contest, so her siblings Gene and Louise have to look after her.

At the contest hosted by Mr. Frond the guidance counselor, Tina sees Jackie and thinks that she might fall off the runway, but her siblings are there to catch her. She realizes that witchcraft is not real and that it was just a random coincidence that made it appear as though her spells worked. She publicly apologizes to Jackie and renounces her dabbling in witchcraft. Both Tina and Tammy fall off the runway with Tina landing on Tammy. Jackie gives Tina back her barrette and removes the curse. Regular-Sized Rudy wins the costume contest.

Meanwhile, Bob makes several jack-o'-lanterns with a burger on them, but all of them are stolen. He tries to find out who it is and suspects his rival Jimmy Pesto. Later he sees his landlord Mr. Fischoeder taking his pumpkin and he asks him what he does with all of them. Mr. Fischoeder tells him to come to his mansion so he can show it to him. The Belcher family visits their landlord that evening and there are all the jack-o'-lanterns from the town with lights inside. Linda says that they look much better than on the sidewalk and the children get a picture taken with the pumpkins.

== Reception ==
Alasdair Wilkins from The A.V. Club gave the episode a "B+" and wrote that "Mr. Ambrose is such a bizarrely wonderful asset for Bob’s Burgers. He’s technically an adult, which lends his absurd suggestions and demonstrably awful advice a thin sheen of credibility. “Teen-A-Witch” doesn’t ask the audience to take even remotely seriously that Tina is an actual witch, but it does need to provide something that can let us suspend disbelief and not believe this is the dumbest plotline imaginable." He also noted that this "episode also makes excellent use of Tina. We’ve seen the confident, trash-talking side of Tina long before now—it remains one of my favorite aspects of “Family Fracas,” which I’m going to go ahead and declare underrated—but it’s turned up to 11 for tonight’s Halloween-centric fun. […] “Teen-A-Tina” also feels unusual in that it’s one of the very few episodes where Tina is basically the bad guy from the start. Even when there was an episode actually called “Bad Tina,” the eldest Belcher child had her heart in the right place whenever Tammy wasn’t forcing her otherwise, give or take an occasional snide side comment to Linda."

The episode received a 1.4 rating and was watched by a total of 3.01 million people.
