= The Quirkducers =

- Bob's Burgers episode
- Episode no.: Season 7 Episode 6
- Directed by: Mauricio Pardo
- Written by: Steven Davis; Kelvin Yu
- Production code: 6ASA16
- Original air date: November 20, 2016

Guest appearances
- David Herman as Mr. Frond; Jenny Slate as Tammy; Bobby Tisdale as Zeke

Episode chronology
← Previous "Large Brother, Where Fart Thou?"	Next → "The Last Gingerbread House on the Left"
- Bob's Burgers season 7

"The Quirkducers" (also known as "The Quirky Turkey") is the sixth episode of the seventh season of the animated comedy series Bob's Burgers and the overall 113th episode, and is written by Steven Davis and Kelvin Yu and directed by Mauricio Pardo. It aired on Fox in the United States on November 20, 2016. In the episode, Gene and Louise decide to sabotage the annual Thanksgiving play to save their long weekend, but Tina provides her fan fiction as the subject matter, leading the kids to work on their own version. Meanwhile, Linda finds a potato that resembles her deceased grandfather.

== Plot ==
With Thanksgiving one week away, Tina is writing Erotic Friendfiction called the "Quirky Turkey", based on what Tammy and Jocelyn called her days ago, with the ending being that the non-quirky turkeys becoming the dinner they thought they were going to. Meanwhile, Louise and Gene are not looking forward to Mr. Frond's annual Thanksgiving play as not only are they boring, but it takes away their half day before Thanksgiving. However, after seeing Mr. Frond close down a public announcement due to an inappropriate song, Louise gets the idea to use Tina's Erotic Friendfiction as this years play, and have Mr. Frond to cancel it in the middle as it will be very offensive. Louise manages to convince Tina and Mr. Frond to let them run the play by making the latter the producer, and they get Jimmy Jr., Zeke, Tammy, and Jocelyn as the cast.

Meanwhile, Linda finds a potato that resembles her late grandfather and decides to keep it around. However, that annoys Bob, and even tries to argue that it does not really resemble her grandfather.

As the rehearsals go on, Louise plans on making it a poorly made play but feels that even then, it's not enough to get shut down. However, Gene's comment on something happening in the red light gets Louise to come up with an idea, and manages to grab turkey giblets and gizzards from a local butcher shop, and an air compressor from Teddy. The plan is to place the giblets inside of bottles, put them in the heads of the turkey's, and after the first song, Louise would turn in the air compressor and release said giblets. After, it would cause Mr. Frond to shut the play down and they would have their half day. However, Tina overhears the plan, and is angry that Louise used her Friendfiction as a way to get a half day, but the other kids are up for the plan if it gets them a half day, much to Tina's dismay.

On the day of the play, it goes on with poor acting and off-key singing. Bob reveals to Linda that he brought her grandfather potato to the play, after telling her not to earlier, much to her joy. However, when the giblets are let loose, it flies everywhere, covering the entire audience in them, and the kids soon realize how gross and disturbing this is. Louise apologizes to Tina for ruining her play, but Tina believes that their situation could help them with a recently new song she created and has Louise stall Mr. Frond from shutting down the play. Tina's song becomes a hit with the audience, and while Gene and Louise know that they might have lost their half day by cleaning up their mess, they decide that it was worth it.

== Reception ==
Alasdair Wilkins from The A.V. Club gave the episode a "B+" and wrote that "that speaks to how all the Belchers function: sometimes as a bridge to us in the audience, but mostly just there to support their equally silly loved ones. It’s a winning combination."

The episode received a 1.2 rating and was watched by a total of 2.46 million people.
