= There's No Business Like Mr. Business Business =

- Bob's Burgers episode
- Episode no.: Season 7 Episode 10
- Directed by: Tyree Dillihay
- Written by: Lizzie Molyneux; Wendy Molyneux
- Production code: 6ASA15
- Original air date: February 19, 2017

Guest appearances
- Megan Mullally as Gayle; John Oliver as Ian Amberson

Episode chronology
← Previous "Bob Actually"	Next → "A Few 'Gurt Men"
- Bob's Burgers season 7

"There's No Business Like Mr. Business Business" is the 10th episode of the seventh season of the American animated comedy series Bob's Burgers and the 117th episode overall. It was written by Lizzie and Wendy Molyneux and directed by Tyree Dillihay. Its guest stars are Megan Mullally as Linda's sister Gayle and John Oliver as Ian Amberson. It originally aired in the US on FOX Network at February 19, 2017. In this episode, Bob is skeptical about Gayle's cat Mr. Business having a career in showbiz, until it looks like the cat could have his big break.

== Plot ==
Gayle wants a showbiz career for her cat, Mr. Business, and borrows money from the Belchers for headshots, though Bob has been growing tired of he and Linda frequently lending Gayle money. She tells Bob and Linda about a competition to get the new face of Chef Cat, a cat food brand. Bob thinks it is a scam so he goes to talk with Ian Amberson, who is representing Mr. Business. Ian convinces Bob about the money that the cat can make if he wins the audition. Bob realizes that if Mr. Business is successful then the cat would be able to generate enough money for Gayle to live independently. Part of the audition is that the cat has to be able to knock over a jar for a commercial, and Linda and Gayle try to get Mr. Business to do it, but he attacks Ian instead. Upon hearing about the attack, Bob tries to train Mr. Business until finally succeeding. When they go to talk with Ian they see that he is representing a different woman and her cat. Tina secretly tries some cat food and loves it, and one day she gets caught by Gene who eats cat food for curiosity and loves it as well, and they make a pact to continue eating cat food in secret.

The Belchers go to the audition but when Gayle feels that Mr. Business is getting stressed she gets nervous, and Louise tries to distract her but Gayle runs away. Bob goes to talk with Ian but when he comes back he notices that the cat is not where it was. Bob and Louise search for Gayle who took the cat when Bob was not paying attention. They find Gayle crying and decide not to make the audition for the good of Mr. Business. Tina and Gene catch Linda eating cat food so they decide to confess. When Bob finds out about it he is disgusted but eats cat food just to bother Ian, who had a terrible audition with the new cat he found to bring as his client.

== Reception ==
Alasdair Wilkins of The A.V. Club gave the episode a "B" and wrote that the episode "is smart to have Bob go a little mad—or possibly just feeling the effects of mixing those allergy meds with alcohol, as he always does—in his training of Mr. Business". He also noted "This was a good, solid episode, and that made that particular frustrating stretch more bearable. It's not my favorite narrative move on Bob's Burgers, but the show has a way of balancing these things out".

The episode received a 0.9 rating and was watched by a total of 1.94 million people.
