= Stand by Gene =

- Bob's Burgers episode
- Episode no.: Season 6 Episode 12
- Directed by: Tyree Dillihay
- Written by: Jon Schroeder
- Production code: 5ASA14
- Original air date: April 3, 2016

Guest appearances
- Aziz Ansari as Daryl; Brian Huskey as Regular Sized Rudy; Andy Kindler as Mort; Tim Meadows as Mike; Jenny Slate as Tammy

Episode chronology
| ← Previous "House of 1000 Bounces" | Next → "Wag the Hog" |
- Bob's Burgers season 6

"Stand by Gene" is the 12th episode of the sixth season of the animated comedy series Bob's Burgers and the overall 100th episode, and is written by Jon Schroeder and directed by Tyree Dillihay. It aired on Fox in the United States on April 3, 2016. In the episode. Gene, Louise, Tina, and their friends go on a journey to look for a mythical creature that supposedly lives nearby. Meanwhile, during downtime at the restaurant, Linda's competitive nature sends her into overdrive.

== Plot ==
A slow day allows the kids to leave the restaurant and look for an adventure while Bob and Linda play basketball with rolled up napkins and their trashcan. At the beach, Gene overhears two teenage boys talk about a two-butted goat and he tries to convince his sisters to go find it at a specific farm. They're on line for an inverted ride at the wharf when several kids overhear them talking about the two-butted goat: Jimmy Jr., Zeke, Jocelyn, Tammy, Darryl, and Rudy. Louise and Gene make a bet; if they don't find the goat then Gene must clean the restaurant when they return. If the goat is real, Louise must clean the restaurant.

The group of kids head out towards the farm on Route 6 but opt to take a short cut they find on a gas station map. Gene is enjoying people doing something he wants to do, Tina is convinced something will await her at the end of their journey (as per a fortune she got at the wharf), and Jimmy Jr. is jealous how well Zeke and Gene are bonding over finding a two-butted goat. After going through an electric fence, they get to a patch of poison ivy and Jocelyn, Tammy, and Darryl opt not to continue. After hopping over rocks to avoid half the toxic field, Gene offers to carry each of them the rest of the way, since it was his idea to go on this journey.

When they finally get to the farm. Gene is upset there does not appear to be a two-butted goat, losing his sense of wonder at the mysteries of life. But another goat appears and it is the mythical goat with two butts. The kids are all excited over it. At the diner, Bob, Linda, Mort, and Teddy play a game Bob invented, "Narts" (Napkin Darts), and Bob finds himself frustrated over continually losing to Linda. He gets Mike the Mailman to play her and he almost tries to sabotage Linda but makes a realization that he should be proud of his wife. He declares her the winner and the kids return home. The bet loser, Louise, is faced with wads of wet napkins stuck all over the restaurant from the Narts tournament.

== Reception ==
Alasdair Wilkins of The A.V. Club gave the episode an A, who went on to say, "I've said before I'm more of a fan of episodes that intermix the adults and the kids, so it's a testament to just how well these two episodes work—particularly in their primarily plotlines with the kids—that both stand out as season-best efforts for the show. After a couple weeks that felt an odd combination of listless and experimental, this is Bob's Burgers leaning on what has always set it apart from its current Fox animation stablemates, namely its commitment to characters and relationships. All that's left now is to debate which is the most perfect pairing: Louise and Rudy, Gene and Zeke, or Bob and that pigeon."

The episode received a 0.9 rating and was watched by a total of 1.99 million people.
