= Secret Admiral-irer =

- Bob's Burgers episode
- Episode no.: Season 6 Episode 18
- Directed by: Brian Loschiavo
- Written by: Holly Schlesinger; H. Jon Benjamin
- Production code: 6ASA06
- Original air date: May 22, 2016

Guest appearances
- Cloris Leachman as Meryl; Joe Lo Truglio as Lionel; Gary Cole as Sergeant Bosco; Sarah Silverman as Ollie; Laura Silverman as Andy

Episode chronology
← Previous "The Horse Rider-er"	Next → "Glued, Where's My Bob?"
- Bob's Burgers season 6

"Secret Admiral-irer" is the 18th episode of the sixth season of the animated comedy series Bob's Burgers and the overall 106th episode, and was written by Holly Schlesinger and H. Jon Benjamin, and directed by Brian Loschiavo. It aired on Fox in the United States on May 22, 2016. In the episode, Tina volunteers at a nursing home to earn her next Thunder Girls badge, where her ideas of love and romance are tested. Meanwhile, Bob makes new friends who lead him into making questionable decisions.

== Plot ==
Tina and Jimmy Jr. are walking home with their siblings. Tina attempts to flirt with Jimmy Jr but he brushes her off and walks away. Louise tells Tina that sometimes she sees romantic things where there are not before Tina leaves them to meet with the Thundergirls as they are volunteers at a nursing home.

At the nursing home, Tina is asked to read to an elderly woman named Meryl, once she walks in the room she meets Meryl's great nephew Joel, who apparently only visits Meryl on his birthday to get a $25 dollar birthday check. Meryl then asks Tina to read her mail.

At the restaurant head chefs Lionel and Donny compliment the burgers and drinks and ask Bob if they can bring chef friends over at midnight, Bob is initially reluctant but finally accepts. At the nursing home, Tina reads Meryl her mail when she finds a letter from a retired Navy admiral named Peter Wilcox who saw Meryl at a USO dance almost sixty years ago but was too shy to ask her to dance with him. Tina is moved although Meryl refuses to write him back as she thinks she is too old for romance and is happy with her current life. That night, Tina, not wanting Meryl to give up her chance at love, answers Wilcox's letter passing herself as Meryl. While Bob keeps hanging out with his fellow chefs Tina keeps visiting Meryl to check her mail for a new letter from Wilcox. When the letter finally arrives Tina confesses to Meryl what she did and reads Wilcox's letter to her, in which the admiral asks Meryl to recreate the night of the dance and for Meryl to wear the blue dress and pearl necklace she wore that night. Thrilled, Meryl accepts and Tina has Linda get the necklace from a storage room.

The next day, Tina, Gene, and Louise help Meryl dress up when Joel walks in the room to get a birthday check as it's his birthday even though his birthday was a week ago, he asks the kids to leave the room as he wanted to talk to his aunt on private. Once Joel leaves, the kids resume helping Meryl prepare herself for the dance until they notice the pearl necklace is gone. The kids try to get Sergeant Bosco to arrest Joel but he doesn't believe them and leaves much to Tina's chagrin.

The kids make Meryl a fake necklace with mints and dental floss and Tina decides she won't tell Meryl about the stolen necklace until after the dance while Louise starts to believe that the admiral is not real but is a lie made up by Joel to get Meryl's pearl necklace, when Meryl walks in Louise tries to tell her about Joel but instead Meryl thanks Tina for giving her something to look forward to. Tina, not wanting to break Meryl's heart, tells her siblings not to tell Meryl what happened and even though the admiral might not be real, Meryl's dance has to happen.

At the retirement home, the kids have Bob pose as the admiral, he and Meryl start dancing when the real Peter Wilcox walks in. When Bob falls asleep he accidentally throws Meryl's purse on the floor and the kids find out that Meryl's real pearl necklace was in her purse all along. Tina wonders if they should tell Sargeant Bosco about it but Louise says he probably forgot about it, although it turns out he didn't as he goes to Joel's apartment to interrogate him and Joel confesses about the birthday checks.

That night, Bob's chef friends arrive at the restaurant and Bob attempts to hide from them as he wants to rest and Linda yells at them to go away because Bob is dead

== Reception ==
Alasdair Wilkins of The A.V. Club gave the episode a B+, he explained his rating by saying, "Still, “Secret Admiral-er” is a Tina episode, and perhaps it's because Tina's character arc has flattened now that her stories aren't quite as consistently amazing as they were a couple years ago. The main story is solid, especially since the show gives itself a relatively high degree of difficulty with how it plays Meryl's senility. There's nothing inherently wrong with playing a nonagenarian's mental state for laughs—well, I suppose you could argue there is, but I'm looking to keep my amoral, value-neutral reviewer pose going, you know?—but this is slightly harsher material than Bob's Burgers usually goes in for, and it takes a little finesse to balance the various comedic targets."

The episode received a 1.0 rating and was watched by a total of 2.23 million people.
