= Flu-ouise =

- Bob's Burgers episode
- Episode no.: Season 7 Episode 1
- Directed by: Tyree Dillihay
- Written by: Nora Smith
- Production code: 6ASA11
- Original air date: September 25, 2016

Guest appearances
- David Herman as Clyde; Amy Schumer as Young Lady

Episode chronology
← Previous "Glued, Where's My Bob?"	Next → "Sea Me Now"
- Bob's Burgers season 7

"Flu-ouise" is the first episode and season premiere of the seventh season of the animated comedy series Bob's Burgers and the overall 108th episode, and is written by Nora Smith and directed by Tyree Dillihay. It aired on Fox in the United States on September 25, 2016. In the episode, Louise comes down with the flu and has a Wizard of Oz-esque fever dream involving a disfigured Kuchi Kopi and her toys, who have the voices of her family.

== Plot ==
Louise comes down with the flu in order to skip school. When she asks Linda to bring her favorite toy, a nightlight called Kuchi Kopi, Linda accidentally drops it into the toilet before dropping it again while trying to clean it. Tina claims that the oven will make it dry faster but Bob accidentally leaves it in too long causing it to melt, Gene then attempts to fix it only to disfigure it. Knowing how Louise will react the family tries to give it to her while she sleeps but Louise wakes up and is horrified.

Angered Louise yells at them stating she will never forgive them. ("Not the Forgiving Type") She then has a fever dream in which she is in a fantasy world with her current Kuchi Kopi (Now named "Ugly Kochi Kopi") who takes her on a journey to the "Impenetrable Fortress" a place where she can be alone while several of her other toys (representing her family) attempt to stop her ("That Fortress is the Worstest") while Ugly Kuchi Kopi claims that they are simply jealous of not being invited as Louise makes it to the fortress and quickly shuts out the toys and is relieved about being alone. ("Nobody's Getting in").

In reality, Bob and Teddy try to find a replacement toy for Louise, finding a late open toy store the owner lets them have the last Kochi Kopi in his store in exchange that the two will listen to him reading all the Kuchi Kopi books. After receiving the toy Linda gives it to Louise while she sleeps which causes a new Kuchi Kopi calling himself "Good Kuchi Kopi" to arrive at the Fortress and tells Louise to simply apologize to her family claiming that she is only suppressing her emotions by staying while Ugly Kuchi Kopi tries to stop Good Kuchi Kopi's message. ("The Forgiving Type") Louise then realizes she is actually distancing herself from her family and presses the "Destroy Fortress Button" (that Good Kuchi Kopi put in as a backup plan) causing the Fortress to be destroyed. She then wakes up with both Kuchi Kopis in her arms with her family standing next to her. Louise forgives them and apologizes for her outburst as they all hug each other.

== Reception ==
Alasdair Wilkins of The A.V. Club gave the episode an A−, saying, "“Flu-ouise” could have hit its themes and character beats harder in its fantasy sequences, but that would have likely meant drawing even closer visual parallels between the toys and Louise’s family, or using their actions as more obvious allegories for Louise’s frustrations with their failures. The episode doesn’t go down this more obvious route, instead casting the other Belchers in a more broadly drawn fantastical adventure. It’s not as tightly focused on Louise learning a specific lesson or working through her issues as it could have been, which—whatever weaknesses that might entail—does mean the episode can throw in delightful, generally Belcher-like character bits like the bear building a sun deck to relax, the octopus drinking heavily with all her pals, and the two final toys trying and adorably failing to be threatening. I’m critiquing “Flu-ouise” for not being tightly focused, yet its looseness is part of its charm. This show either can’t lose or can’t win, I guess, depending on how you want to see it. Either way, this is a damn good premiere."

The episode received a 1.1 rating and was watched by a total of 2.60 million people.
