= Large Brother, Where Fart Thou? =

- Bob's Burgers episode
- Episode no.: Season 7 Episode 5
- Directed by: Chris Song
- Written by: Lizzie Molyneux; Wendy Molyneux
- Production code: 6ASA10
- Original air date: November 20, 2016

Guest appearances
- Kurt Braunohler as Logan Bush; David Herman as Mr. Frond, Director, and Logan's Friend; Erik Griffin as Gerald the accountant

Episode chronology
← Previous "They Serve Horses, Don't They?"	Next → "The Quirkducers"
- Bob's Burgers season 7

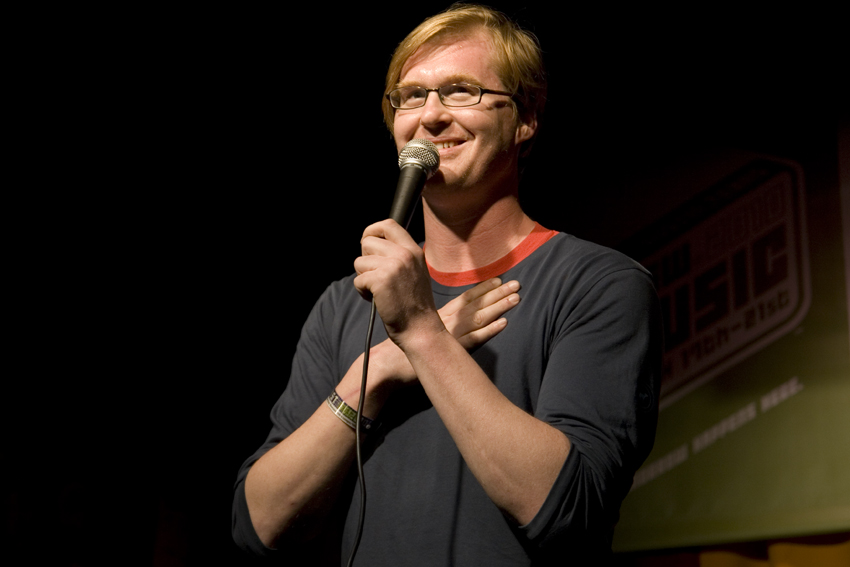
Kurt Braunohler (2010)

"Large Brother, Where Fart Thou?" is the fifth episode of the seventh season of the American animated comedy series Bob's Burgers and the 112th episode overall. It was directed by Chris Song and written by Lizzie and Wendy Molyneux, its guest stars are Kurt Braunohler as Logan Bush, Erik Griffin as Gerald the accountant and David Herman who voices Mr. Frond the school guidance counselor, a director of Lobsterfest, and one of Logan's friends. It originally aired on Fox in the United States on November 20, 2016. In this episode Tina Belcher has detention and Bob and Linda Belcher are in Gerald's office, so Gene and Louise Belcher are on their own when they have to deal with Logan Bush.

== Plot ==
When Tina Belcher overhears that a boy she likes has detention at school, she gets detention on purpose by throwing some books to the ground. Thus, Linda and Bob have no one to babysit Gene and Louise when they have to meet their accountant Gerald, because it is the last day to do their taxes. At Gerald's office, Bob, Linda, and Gerald accidentally eat some marijuana cookies, leaving them stranded at the office until they sober up.

At home, Gene is left in charge of watching his little sister Louise, but she ends up convincing him to toss a moldy cantaloupe out of the window. Louise throws it but accidentally hits Logan Bush, who wants to get revenge. He tries to get into the apartment to do a professional wrestling move called the "Reverse Norwegian Stink Hold" that will painfully force Louise to smell his armpit. He calls her saying he is already in the house and throws a shoe into the kitchen making Gene and Louise think he is really there. They flee the house, and just as he planned, Logan can now get to them, chasing them to the Lobsterfest from the episode of the same name. Gene and Louise disguise themselves by putting on some shrimp costumes, but the upper parts of it fall off. They hide in a warehouse, but Logan can see Louise's bunny ears from her hat. When Logan is about to do the wrestling move, she begins to cry from fear and Gene places himself in front of her to protect his sister, so Logan ends up doing the move on Gene instead. Louise is horrified and honored that Gene took her place watching Gene suffer for her and thanks to her elder brother for sticking up for her and they hug.

Meanwhile, Bob, Linda, and Gerald are still high and they build a fort out of some cushions to hide from Gerald's next client. Bob and Linda reveal to Gerald that they do not find his constant jokes very funny, but convince him to keep doing them if they make him happy and improve on them. Tina is in detention and dreams about being together with the boy she likes but cannot see him because another boy sits in between.

== Reception ==
Alasdair Wilkins from The A.V. Club gave the episode a "B+" and wrote that "[g]etting Tina out of the picture allows the show to focus on just Gene and Louise, and the latter’s reaction when Bob and Linda decide the babysitting arrangement is telling: Who would ever think of Gene as an older brother? Sure, he’s the epitome of a middle child, but that implies both Tina and Louise are there to keep him in that center spot. When it’s just Louise and Gene, the age difference feels incidental, with them operating more as unhinged partners in crime than any recognizable spin on an older brother and younger sister." He also noted that the "moment where Gene reluctantly stands between Louise and Logan is genuinely touching, all the more so because the episode doesn’t remotely hide Gene’s reluctance. He’s scared and unclear why he’s doing something this stupidly brave, yet he doesn’t allow his fear or confusion deter him in the slightest. He’s resolute in a way that doesn’t contradict at all what makes Gene, well, what makes him Gene."

The episode received a 1.1 rating and was watched by a total of 2.35 million people.

== External weblink ==
- "Large Brother, Where Fart Thou?" at IMDb
