= Bob's Burgers season 7 =

Bob's Burgers
- Season 7
- DVD cover
- No. of episodes: 22

Release
- Original network: Fox
- Original release: September 25, 2016 – June 11, 2017

Season chronology
- ← Previous; Season 6 Next → Season 8

The seventh season of the animated comedy series Bob's Burgers began airing on Fox in the United States on September 25, 2016, and concluded on June 11, 2017. The season contained 22 episodes.

On October 7, 2015, the series was renewed for a seventh production cycle, which premiered during the seventh broadcast season.

== Episodes ==
No. overall	No. in season	Title	Directed by	Written by	Original release date	Prod. code	U.S. viewers (millions)
108	1	"Flu-ouise"	Tyree Dillihay	Nora Smith	September 25, 2016	6ASA11	2.60
Louise comes down with the flu and has a Wizard of Oz-esque fever dream involving a disfigured Kuchi Kopi and her toys, who have the voices of her family.
109	2	"Sea Me Now"	Chris Song	Dan Fybel	October 9, 2016	6ASA07	2.79
Teddy tries to impress his ex-wife, Denise, when the Belchers accompany him for a ride on his newly restored boat. Meanwhile, Tina takes care of Bob's restaurant eraser, in an attempt to get her own cell phone.
110	3	"Teen-a Witch"	Chris Song	Holly Schlesinger	October 23, 2016	6ASA13	3.01
Tina seeks Mr. Ambrose's help in competing against Tammy in the Halloween costume contest. Meanwhile, Bob tries to figure out who is stealing his pumpkins.
111	4	"They Serve Horses, Don't They?"	Tyree Dillihay	Steven Davis & Kelvin Yu	November 6, 2016	6ASA08	2.42
The Belchers find themselves in a full-blown investigation when Bob secures a new meat provider who claims to save clients money on their orders.
112	5	"Large Brother, Where Fart Thou?"	Chris Song	Lizzie Molyneux & Wendy Molyneux	November 20, 2016	6ASA10	2.35
Gene and Louise are on their own when a mishap sends Tina to detention, while Bob and Linda get into trouble with their accountant.
113	6	"The Quirkducers"	Mauricio Pardo	Steven Davis & Kelvin Yu	November 20, 2016	6ASA16	2.46
Gene and Louise decide to sabotage the annual Thanksgiving play to save their long weekend, but Tina provides her fan fiction as the subject matter, leading the kids to work on their own version. Meanwhile, Linda finds a potato that resembles her deceased grandfather.
114	7	"The Last Gingerbread House on the Left"	Chris Song	Nora Smith	November 27, 2016	6ASA18	2.44
Bob gets involved in a gingerbread house competition when Mr. Fischoeder asks him to bring food to his house. Meanwhile, Linda and Teddy take the kids caroling to spread holiday cheer.
115	8	"Ex Mach Tina"	Brian Loschiavo	Greg Thompson	January 8, 2017	6ASA09	3.58
When Tina hurts her ankle, she is offered a chance to try a new technology that allows her to telecommute to school. Meanwhile, Bob gets a banjo and tries to find his perfect "banjo moment".
116	9	"Bob Actually"	Chris Song	Steven Davis & Kelvin Yu	February 12, 2017	6ASA22	1.67
As Valentine's Day approaches, the kids find themselves in love-caused chaos. Meanwhile, Bob attempts to impress Linda with a romantic gesture.
117	10	"There's No Business Like Mr. Business Business"	Tyree Dillihay	Lizzie Molyneux & Wendy Molyneux	February 19, 2017	6ASA15	1.97
When Bob finds out that Linda has secured a pet agent to fund the showbiz career of Gayle's cat, Mr. Business, he attempts to help the cat in getting his big break. Meanwhile, Gene and Tina secretly become obsessed with eating cat food.
118	11	"A Few 'Gurt Men"	Tyree Dillihay	Jon Schroeder	March 5, 2017	6ASA19	1.77
Louise must defend one of her biggest foes during a mock-trial at Wagstaff. Meanwhile, Bob teams up with Jimmy Pesto to oust a regular food-scammer.
119	12	"Like Gene for Chocolate"	Brian Loschiavo	Rich Rinaldi	March 12, 2017	6ASA12	1.82
When Gene finds out that the formula for his favorite chocolate has changed, he attempts to resolve the situation with the company's head. Meanwhile, Bob gets involved in one of Teddy's not-so-perfect plans.
120	13	"The Grand Mama-pest Hotel"	Chris Song	Scott Jacobson	March 19, 2017	6ASA14	1.93
After seeing Tina make a new friend, Linda begins invading her space at a heroine conference. Meanwhile, Gene and Louise give Bob the bachelor party he never had.
121	14	"Aquaticism"	Brian Loschiavo	Dan Fybel	March 26, 2017	6ASA17	1.86
When Tina learns that the Touch n' Sea Aquarium is in danger of shutting down, Gene and Louise decide to help her come up with a plan to save it. Meanwhile, Bob finds himself learning a few things from Linda's customer service skills.
122	15	"Ain't Miss Debatin'"	Mauricio Pardo	Greg Thompson	March 26, 2017	6ASA20	1.86
Tina unexpectedly finds success and a relationship with Henry when she is recruited by Wagstaff's debate team. Meanwhile, Gene and Louise convince Bob and Linda to help fund their stop-motion film.
123	16	"Eggs for Days"	Brian Loschiavo	Lizzie Molyneux & Wendy Molyneux	April 2, 2017	6ASA21	1.52
Bob and Linda's Easter egg hunt for the kids goes wrong when a missing egg becomes rotten and stinks up their apartment.
124	17	"Zero Larp Thirty"	Tyree Dillihay	Rich Rinaldi	April 23, 2017	7ASA01	1.58
Linda wins a dream weekend at the house where her favorite TV show is filmed, but her trip does not go as planned. Meanwhile, Teddy looks after the kids, but his bad back forces him to stay on the floor.
125	18	"The Laser-inth"	Mauricio Pardo	Scott Jacobson	April 23, 2017	7ASA02	1.88
Gene goes with Bob to the planetarium's final rock-and-roll laser show. Meanwhile, Linda, Louise, and Tina go out to dinner at a wacky restaurant, where Louise has a revelation.
126	19	"Thelma & Louise Except Thelma is Linda"	Brian Loschiavo	Jon Schroeder	April 30, 2017	7ASA03	1.59
After Louise gets in trouble at school, Linda is forced to choose between following Wagstaff's policy or her own moral code. Meanwhile, Bob finds himself alone when Teddy decides to help a bunch of cyclists.
127	20	"Mom, Lies, and Videotapes"	Chris Song	Dan Fybel	May 7, 2017	7ASA04	2.02
Linda comes down with a cold and cannot attend the Mother's Day show at Wagstaff, so the kids decide to put on their version of the pageant for her when Bob's camcorder malfunctions.
128	21	"Paraders of the Lost Float"	Bernard Derriman	Steven Davis	May 21, 2017	7ASA05	1.61
With the promise of an easy win, Teddy persuades Bob to enter the Bog to Beach parade float contest, despite the rainy weather that will occur on the day of the parade.
129	22	"Into the Mild"	Tyree Dillihay	Kelvin Yu	June 11, 2017	7ASA06	1.52
When Bob finally realizes his dream of becoming an outdoorsman, he goes to a wilderness survival store that's going out of business -- and ends up locked there overnight with the store's owner, Austin (voiced by Rob Riggle). Meanwhile, Linda and the kids attend a rehearsal for Gayle's one-woman show and Linda and Gayle get into an argument over an encounter they had with Delta Burke.
