= Bye Bye Boo Boo =

- Bob's Burgers episode
- Episode no.: Season 6 Episode 16
- Directed by: Tyree Dillihay
- Written by: Scott Jacobson
- Production code: 6ASA05
- Original air date: May 8, 2016

Guest appearances
- Max Greenfield as Boo Boo; Sarah Silverman as Ollie; Laura Silverman as Andy; Lauren Lapkus as Krissy

Episode chronology
← Previous "Pro Tiki/Con Tiki"	Next → "The Horse Rider-er"
- Bob's Burgers season 6

"Bye Bye Boo Boo" is the 16th episode of the sixth season of the animated comedy series Bob's Burgers and the overall 104th episode, and is written by Scott Jacobson and directed by Tyree Dillihay. It aired on Fox in the United States on May 8, 2016. In the episode, after hearing that Boo Boo is leaving Boyz 4 Now, Louise enters a contest that could finally give Tina a chance to meet him. Meanwhile, Bob and Linda learn about a mobster who got shot in the restaurant in 1931, which causes tension between Bob and Jimmy Pesto.

== Plot ==
When Louise hears that Boo Boo is leaving Boyz 4 Now, she enters a contest under Tina's name that could give Tina the chance to meet him, requiring them to have two hundred signatures. Tina and Louise later learn that the Krissy's Boyz 4 Now fan club plan to win the contest in order to vomit on Boo Boo for leaving the band and despite The girls getting the signatures Krissy ultimately wins, Louise manages to prevent it by confessing that she loves Boo Boo.

Meanwhile, Bob and Linda learn about a mobster named Dominic "The Grunt" Gruntanno. who was shot and killed in the restaurant in 1931 and given a plaque to confirm it, creating tension between Bob and Jimmy Pesto due to his fondness for gangster movies, Jimmy then makes a fake plaque to put outside his restaurant gaining popularity. Bob then calls a historian to prove Jimmy's lie but decides not through with it, due to Jimmy being happy.

== Reception ==
Alasdair Wilkins of The A.V. Club gave the episode an A−, he explained his rating by saying, "“Bye Bye Boo Boo” is a classic, a worthy illustration of all the show can be when it takes a bunch of its characters both familiar and new, gives them all clear motivations, and lets them bounce off one another. Tina and Louise get to bond over their respective sets of crazed feelings, a bunch of excitable preteens almost drench an undersized boy singer with vomit, and said singer instantly recognizes Louise the moment she slaps him again. This is pretty much everything I could ever want from a Bob's Burgers episode, and it's particularly exhilarating to watch this after one of the show's rare misfires. I didn't doubt the show is still going to hit way, way more than it misses, but this was a damn home run."

The episode received a 1.0 rating and was watched by a total of 2.31 million people.
