= The Gene and Courtney Show =

- Bob's Burgers episode
- Episode no.: Season 6 Episode 7
- Directed by: Chris Song
- Written by: Rich Rinaldi
- Production code: 6ASA01
- Original air date: February 14, 2016

Guest appearances
- David Wain as Courtney; Will Forte as Mr. Grant; John Michael Higgins as Doug; David Herman as Mr. Frond; Jenny Slate as Tammy

Episode chronology
← Previous "The Cook, the Steve, the Gayle, & Her Lover"	Next → "Sexy Dance Healing"
- Bob's Burgers season 6

"The Gene and Courtney Show" is the seventh episode of the sixth season of the animated comedy series Bob's Burgers and the overall 95th episode, and is written by Rich Rinaldi and directed by Chris Song and Bernard Derriman. It aired on Fox in the United States on February 14, 2016. In the episode, Gene and Courtney are asked to host the morning announcements, but their romantic history threatens to get in the way of their big break. Meanwhile, Tina's attempt to play Cupid at the Valentine's Day carnation fundraiser goes tragically awry.

== Plot ==
Valentine's Day is coming up and Tina is in charge of the "Donations 4 Carnations" box. Bob, who forgot to pre-order the carnations, attempts to order them from the florist, from a funeral home, and from the botanical garden but does not succeed. Tina also has troubles when she tears opens up all the envelopes in the locked box to see if anyone submitted her name to send her a carnation. Her mother promises to match the sender to the recipient while she's at school.

After making fun of the boring morning announcements, Gene and Courtney get an offer from the A/V guy, Mr. Grant, to take over morning announcements. Despite some first time jitters, they nail it and are on track to replace Ms. Labonz, growing closer in the process. Unfortunately, their relationship affects their banter and the students soon find them mushy and boring. After determining they cannot be in a relationship and have a successful show, Courtney suggests they give up the relationship, much to Gene's dismay.

Bob and Teddy go to a large flower wholesaler in the middle of the night in a last ditch effort to get 250 carnations for Tina's fundraiser and Bob ends up paying a lot for them. Tina delivers the carnations to the students they were ordered for and is happily surprised when Jimmy Jr gives her a rose at the end of her delivery. Gene and Courtney's announcements are closed out with a heartfelt song by Gene about accepting heartbreak.

== Reception ==
Alasdair Wilkins of The A.V. Club gave the episode an A and wrote, "The climactic visit to the flower wholesalers market is a wonderful bit of Bob’s Burgers silliness, with a setup that feels simultaneously ridiculously and deeply plausible, if only because the whole thing works because all those flower sellers take the whole black-market carnation-selling thing so seriously. It even all culminates in the perfect little romantic note, as Bob and Linda admit they have been far too busy helping the kids to get anything for each other. But hey, they can always just go make out. And if that’s not a Valentine’s Day sentiment for all to get behind, I don’t know what is." Sean Fitz-Gerald from Vulture gave the episode a positive review by saying, "Those perks, coupled with the tiny advances in Gene's maturation and Tina's love life, made "The Gene & Courtney Show" another triumph in this series' already-strong repertoire of holiday material. And for what it's worth, after Gene pours his heart out to Courtney, he's also rewarded with a kiss — a strategically placed wrench in their story line."

The episode received a 1.0 rating and was watched by a total of 2.05 million people.
