= Sexy Dance Healing =

- Bob's Burgers episode
- Episode no.: Season 6 Episode 8
- Directed by: Chris Song; Bernard Derriman
- Written by: Rich Rinaldi
- Production code: 5ASA15
- Original air date: February 21, 2016

Guest appearances
- Kevin Kline as Mr. Fischoeder; Steve Buscemi as Tom Innocenti; Jon Glaser as Jairo

Episode chronology
← Previous "The Gene and Courtney Show"	Next → "Sacred Couch"
- Bob's Burgers season 6

"Sexy Dance Healing" is the eighth episode of the sixth season of the animated comedy series Bob's Burgers and the overall 96th episode, and is written by Rich Rinaldi and directed by Chris Song and Bernard Derriman. It aired on Fox in the United States on February 21, 2016. In the episode, Bob must take legal action after he slips on the sidewalk and needs to pay for surgery, and ends up under the care of Jairo, who attempts to heal him without a doctor. Meanwhile, Gene, Louise, and Tina create a fake law firm to settle their discrepancies towards each other.

== Plot ==
Bob has been having trouble coming up with a "Burger of the Day" and when he takes a walk to clear his head, he slips in front of Jairo's Capoeira Emporium (from season 1, 'Sexy Dance Fighting'). At the doctor's office, Bob receives a cast for his torn labrum and is told he needs to pay $6000 for surgery and rehab. Nurse Sandra suggests Bob sue Jairo since he admitted to dumping oil on the sidewalk where Bob slipped and got injured.

After getting a letter from Bob's lawyer, Jairo offers to heal Bob in 10 sessions and if he cannot, he will pay for Bob's surgery. The Belcher kids, impressed with how well a lawyer's letter can get a response, make up a phony attorney letterhead and serve fake lawyer letters all over town to get what they want. Though Bob is initially skeptical of Jairo's free-spirited healing, the results make him a believer and soon his shoulder is healed. He is so thankful that when Jairo gets evicted from his studio, Bob invites him to stay at his house.

With the "Burger of the Day" deemed as the main thing causing Bob stress, he decides not to put one up which upsets his family and Teddy. The kids try to evict him with their phony lawyer letter but get found out. Linda gives Bob a burger order which initially stresses him out but ultimately spurs him to come up with a pun-perfect "Burger of the Day". Jairo is confused that Bob enjoys coming up with new burger names even if it's sometimes stressful, and he decides to leave. Luckily for Jairo, he gets his old studio back after the kids threaten his landlord, Mr. Fischoeder, with their fake lawyer letter and blackmail.

== Reception ==
Sean Fitz-Gerald from Vulture gave the episode a mixed review by saying, "While all that might make "Sexy Dance Healing" sound like it embraces a stale set-up, its new dynamics and obstacles make it still feel somewhat fresh. To the Burger of the Day end, it's fun to watch an episode in which something normally seen in the background comes to the foreground. (It almost feels like a meta note on the rigors of the creative process — as Redditors have pointed out, it's easy to imagine how this story idea could have come about in the writers room.) And even though we know Jairo, we don't know the healing side of his business or his pro-Bob mindset."

The episode received a 1.1 rating and was watched by a total of 2.29 million people.
