= Sacred Couch =

- Bob's Burgers episode
- Episode no.: Season 6 Episode 9
- Directed by: Brian Loschiavo
- Written by: Greg Thompson
- Production code: 5ASA16
- Original air date: March 6, 2016

Guest appearances
- Wanda Sykes as Sofa Queen; Keegan-Michael Key as Bartender; Jordan Peele as Salesman

Episode chronology
← Previous "Sexy Dance Healing"	Next → "Lice Things Are Lice"
- Bob's Burgers season 6

"Sacred Couch" is the ninth episode of the sixth season of the animated comedy series Bob's Burgers and the overall 97th episode, and was written by Greg Thompson and directed by Brian Loschiavo. It aired on Fox in the United States on March 6, 2016. In the episode, Linda tries to convince the Belchers to not replace their old couch with a new one, and Louise decides to take matters into her own hands.

== Plot ==
It's family TV night and Linda is enjoying the "Sofa Queen" commercial. Bob and Louise take that moment to bring up wanting to get rid of their smelly, lumpy couch but Linda refuses, saying they've had so many family memories on it. After getting outvoted 3 to 2, Louise and Bob commiserate but later that night Louise sabotages the couch so it breaks when Linda, Gene, and Tina sit on it. The family have no choice but to get a replacement from the Sofa Queen Outlet.

Linda is disappointed the Sofa Queen isn't at the outlet store, although her brother-in-law, who plays the "Sofa Jester", is there and ready to make a sale (and prod Gene and Tina into chair-breaking bets so he can charge them). After finding out what Louise did to the family couch (and that Bob unintentionally inspired her to "take a hit out" on their couch), Linda runs off crying and the Sofa Queen ultimately shows up to calm her down and sell them a couch floor model. Once home, and after seeing how pathetic their old couch looks on the sidewalk, Louise regrets her decision and convinces the family to get the old couch back. They are too late when it turns out some teenagers took their old couch.

With information from Teddy, the family goes to a club called The Ear Drum to look for the teenage boys. The bartender there tells them the boys are part of a band who change their name and their corresponding gimmick; they recently re-named themselves "The Couch Burners". The family find them at the train depot and after trying to ask for the couch back, Linda suggests trading their new couch for the old one. Bob protests that they could have sold it but ultimately allows the switch and the family get their broken, stained couch back. They watch Bob try to take an album cover photo of the teenagers in front of their burning, new couch.

== Reception ==
Alasdair Wilkins of The A.V. Club gave the episode a B, who went on to say, "This is the kind of weird, offbeat choice—one that totally works, and is a rarely seen move in primetime animated comedy—that makes me think the rambling structure of the rest of the episode is, if not necessarily what the writers set out to accomplish, then at least something with a degree of intention behind it. 'Sacred Couch' is an experiment in weird, offbeat storytelling, and even if it doesn't quite work, I'm glad Bob's Burgers is the kind of show that always feels like it's trying its best to explore new territory." Sean Fitz-Gerald from Vulture gave the episode a mixed review by saying, "'Sacred Couch' is filled with those slight deviations that might lure some fans and turn off others. It plays as more offbeat than usual — a risk that will either make this an episode that's skipped during repeat marathons or cherished as a zany, underrated classic."

The episode received a 1.1 rating and was watched by a total of 2.64 million people.
