= Glued, Where's My Bob? =

- Bob's Burgers episode
- Episode no.: Season 6 Episode 19
- Directed by: Bernard Derriman
- Written by: Steven Davis; Kelvin Yu
- Production code: 5ASA21
- Original air date: May 22, 2016

Guest appearances
- Kevin Kline as Mr. Fischoeder; Brian Huskey as Regular Sized Rudy; Bobby Tisdale as Zeke; Jay Johnston as Jimmy Pesto; David Herman as Marshmallow; Rob Huebel as Newton; Tim Meadows as Mike; Ken Jeong as Dr. Yap; Kumail Nanjiani as Skip Marooch; Keegan-Michael Key as Cory; Jenny Slate as Tammy; Pamela Adlon as Olsen Benner

Episode chronology
← Previous "Secret Admiral-irer"	Next → "Flu-ouise"
- Bob's Burgers season 6

"Glued, Where's My Bob?" is the 19th episode of sixth season of the American animated comedy series Bob's Burgers. Written by Steven Davis and Kelvin Yu, the episode features guest appearances from actors Rob Huebel, Kumail Nanjiani, and Keegan-Michael Key, as well as appearances by recurring guest stars Pamela Adlon, Ken Jeong, Tim Meadows, and Jenny Slate. Its main plot sees Gene Belcher (Eugene Mirman), Louise Belcher (Kristen Schaal), and Tina (Dan Mintz) getting into a prank war which causes Bob to end up in a sticky situation, where he learns that a journalist is coming to the restaurant to do a story on it, and the whole town ends up getting involved.

Although the episode was the 107th in airing order, "Glued, Where's My Bob?" was the 100th in production order; since 100 episodes is a milestone for any television series, Fox promoted the episode as the series' 100th. Creator Loren Bouchard didn't want to make the episode anything too special, or rather different. Instead, he and the show's creative team decided they wanted to make what seemed like a "quintessential" episode. The episode originally aired on May 22, 2016 on Fox, drawing an audience of 2.04 million viewers, and was met with critical acclaim from both critics and fans, who have praised it for its plot, character development, and the overall quality of the show's success. Due to the high praise that the episode received, this episode was submitted for, and received, two nominations at the 44th Annie Awards for Best General Audience Animated TV/Broadcast Production and Outstanding Achievement, Music in an Animated TV/Broadcast Production.

== Plot ==
The kids are in the middle of a prank war where they "goop" each other by covering various things with items such as grape jelly, hummus, and toothpaste. While this is going on Bob gets a call from Skip Marooch, the celebrity chef who Bob nearly defeated in a burger making competition, who tells him that a local food magazine titled "Coasters" is coming over to interview him for their "hidden gems" segment as a favor to Skip, a fan of Bob's cooking. Bob is to be featured on the front page.

Unfortunately, Bob falls victim to the biggest prank in the goop war when he sits in something Louise spread on the toilet intending to get Gene. Further complicating matters is the revelation that the "goop" Louise used is a highly concentrated adhesive concocted by Teddy that he calls his "sticky spackle" and is stronger than superglue.

Once word gets out of Bob's predicament, the whole town and the local news team descend on Bob's Burgers to try to get a view of him. Teddy is called upon to free Bob, only to further embarrass Bob when he breaks down the bathroom door and exposes him to the crowd. After a curtain is hung over the door, Teddy goes to work applying nail polish remover to the adhesive, while Louise repeatedly claims zero responsibility for her role in what happened.

Once it becomes clear that Teddy is unable to get Bob free, Louise places a call to Dr. Yap. Since his job as a dentist involves heavy use of adhesives and solvents, he tells a skeptical Bob that he is the best person for the job at that exact moment. Yap decides the best way to free Bob, given their limited resources and time, is to inject Novocain into his butt and pull him off the toilet with a rope. Unfortunately, it does not work and Bob remains stuck.

Shortly thereafter, the crew from Coasters shows up and, seeing Bob's predicament, decide that they will not be featuring him or the restaurant in the article as they do not believe him to be interesting enough. Bob, having been struggling to maintain his composure throughout, finally snaps and says that the whole situation is a perfect reflection of the daily grind at Bob's Burgers and kicks the two men out of the restaurant.

As they are leaving, Louise stops the crew members and tells them off. In the process she finally admits she is the one to blame for what happened to Bob, and Teddy leads the restaurant in a chant of "Toilet Bob" in support of him. Bob is finally able to free himself from the toilet and stand up (albeit briefly), which results in cheers from the gathered crowd.

One month later, Bob receives a copy of Coasters from Mike the mailman and discovers that he was featured in the magazine after all. The writers praised Bob for the way he ran his business and how it seemed to fit into the town's way of life. Despite the fact that a picture of him stuck to the toilet was published as part of the piece, the article encourages people to stop in and ask to hear the story for themselves and wishes the restaurant well. While Bob is not too pleased about having the toilet incident published, he is happy that Coasters put out a positive piece on Bob's Burgers and even happier that the article appears to have given the restaurant some much needed publicity and customers.

== Production ==
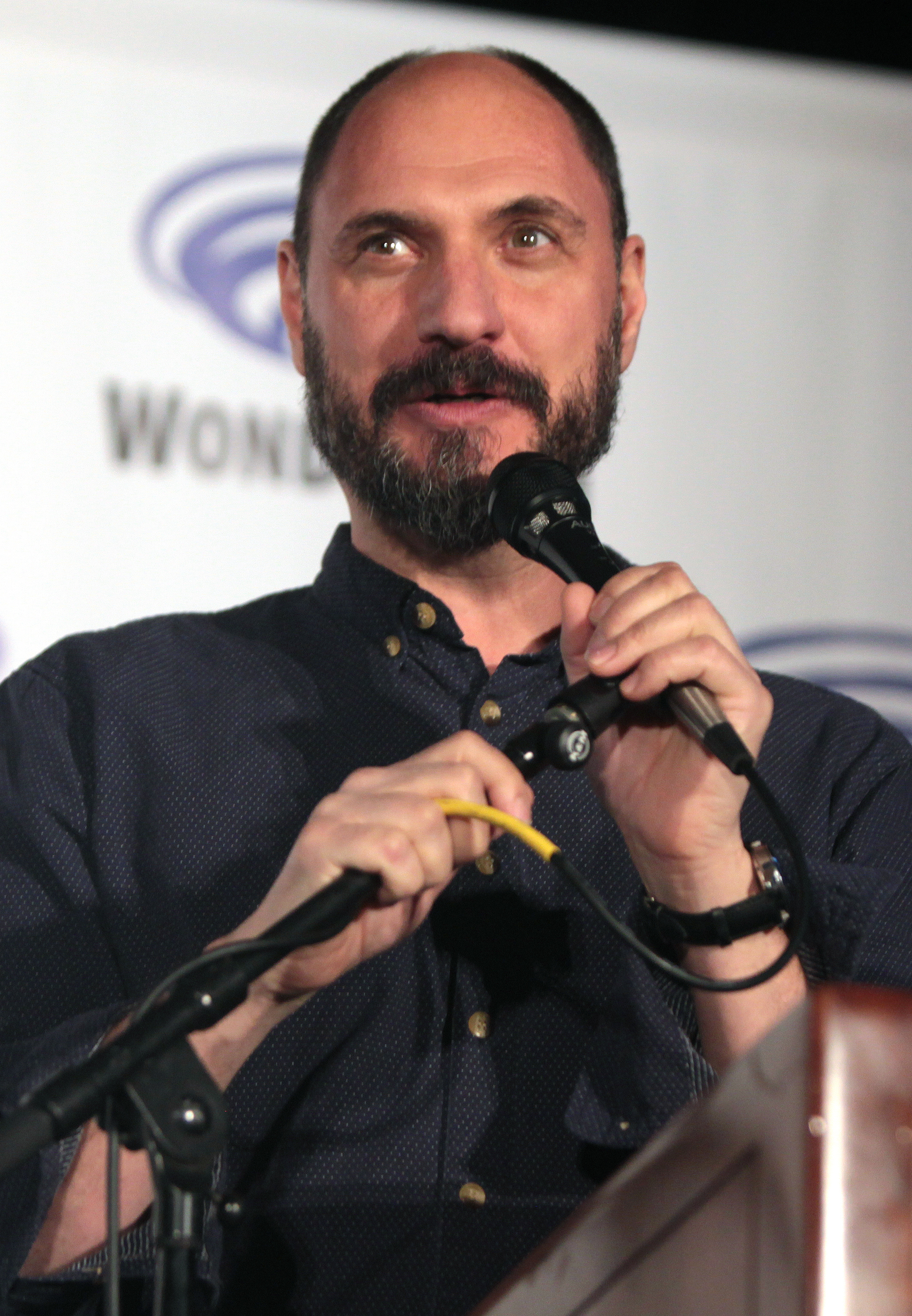
Series creator Loren Bouchard did not want to make the 100th episode a big clichéd special like many series' do.

"Glued, Where's My Bob?" was written by Steven Davis and Kelvin Yu and directed by Bernard Derriman. Upon hearing the writers' pitch of the episode, series creator Loren Bouchard found its plot to be "such an immediately appealing story" and "a great way to have Louise peek over the other side of adolescence and look into the abyss". In an interview with TV Insider, Bouchard came up with the idea of having the episode to be centered around Bob by explaining of "We have this ensemble cast, and we always try to vary the episodes so that, to an extent, an episode might focus on one character's journey or the relationship between two characters, like Linda and Louise in "Mother Daughter Laser Razor"—or Bob and Gene in the one where he goes and returns a remote control helicopter. We try to spread those out so that over the course of a season or even a half a season, you feel like you've gotten roughly equal time with all the characters. Generally speaking, when you get to a Bob-centric episode, it should feel like just about time that you'd just be wanting it, like we haven't had one in a little while. Same for all the other characters."

Production of the episode began sometime in 2015, as it was revealed in San Diego Comic-Con. Cast member Kristen Schaal explained the plot of the episode by saying, "Someone gets stuck to a toilet."

== Reception ==
"Glued, Where's My Bob?" received universal acclaim by both critics and audiences. The episode was watched by 2.04 million viewers and received a 0.9/3 Nielsen rating in the 18–49 demographic, becoming the fourth most-watched program of the Fox Sunday block for the night. Alasdair Wilkins of The A.V. Club graded the episode an A, writing, "It’s the kind of episode that could easily work as a series ender [...] as the story uses Bob’s escalating predicament as an excuse to bring back as many townspeople as it can cram into the restaurant for the big climactic moment." Molly Freeman of Screenrant praised the episode and overall the sixth season, by saying, "All in all, ‘Glued, Where’s My Bob?’ is an excellent cap to a season of Bob's Burgers as well as its milestone 100th episode (though, that's according to production codes, while it's the 107th episode to have aired). Altogether season 6 of Bob's Burgers maintained the balance of comedy and heart that has made the series so popular among fans."

Ray Richmond of TheWrap praised the episode and overall the quality of the show after its milestone by writing, "Bob’s Burgers has already exceeded the runs of quite a few classic TV programs. The Larry Sanders Show made it to only 89 episodes, The Sopranos to 86, Downton Abbey to just 51. So in that sense, it has more than earned its keep. Just don't compare it to The Simpsons in either its content or longevity."
