= They Serve Horses, Don't They? =

- Bob's Burgers episode
- Episode no.: Season 7 Episode 4
- Directed by: Tyree Dillihay
- Written by: Steven Davis; Kelvin Yu
- Production code: 6ASA08
- Original air date: November 6, 2016

Guest appearances
- Ken Marino as Jack Conway; Sam Seder as Hugo; Ron Lynch as Ron; Jay Johnston as Jimmy; Laura Silverman as Andy; Sarah Silverman as Ollie

Episode chronology
← Previous "Teen-a Witch"	Next → "Large Brother, Where Fart Thou?"
- Bob's Burgers season 7

"They Serve Horses, Don't They?" is the fourth episode of the seventh season of the animated comedy series Bob's Burgers and the overall 111th episode, and is written by Steven Davis and Kelvin Yu and directed by Tyree Dillihay. It aired on Fox in the United States on November 6, 2016. In the episode, the Belchers find themselves in a full-blown investigation when Bob secures a new meat provider who claims to save clients money on their orders.

== Plot ==
Jimmy Pesto arrives at Bob's Burgers to brag about his new meat provider, Jack Conway, who saves him a substantial amount of money. Bob is interested and hires Conway; the two take an instant liking to each other, and Teddy and the customers enjoy the quality of the meat, which Conway sells as USDA prime beef. However, Hugo the health inspector arrives and informs Bob that Conway is in fact selling horse meat – a revelation that angers Tina (Due to her love for horses) and Teddy, though Teddy quickly takes a liking to the new product. Hugo offers to leave the restaurant alone if Bob aids him in a sting operation, which Hugo describes as a "way out of his jurisdiction" that he is performing to spite the FDA. Hugo straps a toy microphone and a tape recorder to Bob's chest, telling Bob he needs two things on tape: a record of the transaction, and a record of Conway claiming his product as USDA prime. However, various mishaps prevent Bob from collecting the information for Hugo, and the restaurant's walk-in is soon filled with unnecessary purchases of horse meat.

Conway invites the Belchers to his birthday party at his house, where they meet his pregnant wife. Tina tries to prevent Jimmy Jr. from eating the hot dogs the Conways serve, which she suspects contain horse meat. Bob once again tries to collect the information from Conway. Conway, finally suspicious, invites Bob into his house and tells him he knows about the sting. After inadvertently revealing the conversation is going straight to tape, Conway attempts to steal the tape and chases Bob through the party to steal it. Bob gets stuck in a bush but manages to throw the tape to Hugo; Conway is fined and begins selling beef. Nonetheless, Conway maintains no hard feelings towards the Belchers and drops by the restaurant to announce he's writing a book on his experience in the meat industry: "Friday Night Meats". Meanwhile, Jimmy Pesto is angered that he no longer has access to cheap meat.

== Reception ==
Alasdair Wilkins of The A.V. Club gave the episode a B+, saying, ""They Serve Horses, Don’t They?" would have been well within its rights to take the Tina story easy and just let her seethe with righteous anger the entire episode, because that's already more than funny enough, but the episode goes a step further by entangling Tina with a sunburnt, hot dog-craving Jimmy Jr. It's always fun to see a new dimension to Tina's infatuation with her butt-having neighbor, and it's a clever twist for Tina to prioritize protecting Jimmy Jr. from horsemeat even if she knows it's annoying him. Tina doesn't necessarily get her big revenge moment against Conway, though she does at least get to give him a little piece of her mind, which is probably more in keeping with this episode's sense of stakes anyway. A Hugo-driven episode like this isn't going to be about the big, sweeping moments. It's all much, much sadder than that. But that can still be plenty funny and plenty good."

The episode received a 1.0 rating and was watched by a total of 2.42 million people.
