= Gayle Makin' Bob Sled =

- Bob's Burgers episode
- Episode no.: Season 6 Episode 4
- Directed by: Tyree Dillihay
- Written by: Lizzie Molyneux and Wendy Molyneux
- Production code: 5ASA17
- Original air date: November 8, 2015

Guest appearance
- Megan Mullally as Gayle

Episode chronology
← Previous "The Hauntening"	Next → "Nice-Capades"
- Bob's Burgers season 6

"Gayle Makin' Bob Sled" is the fourth episode of the sixth season of the animated comedy series Bob's Burgers and the overall 92nd episode. It was written by Lizzie Molyneux and Wendy Molyneux, and directed by Tyree Dillihay. It aired on Fox in the United States on November 8, 2015. In the episode, The Belchers' Thanksgiving festivities are put in jeopardy when Bob finds himself staying with an injured Aunt Gayle during a snowstorm.

== Plot ==
Bob is cooking Thanksgiving dinner. Linda cannot drive in the snow and Gayle is on crutches after she injured her ankle, so Bob has to drive to Gayle's to pick her up for Thanksgiving dinner. The car gets snowed in and Bob has to figure a way to transport Gayle, her crutches, her cat, Mr. Business, and slide back to the Belcher apartment. Linda and the kids must do the cooking.

== Reception ==
Alasdair Wilkins of The A.V. Club gave the episode a B+, saying, ""Gayle Making Bob Sled" is an episode that can just lean on what's already been established about Bob, Gayle, and the rest of the family, and it's going to get plenty of laughs just from having Bob drag a fake-injured Gayle through the snow while Linda and the kids freak out about even the most basic (and, in fairness, the far more complicated) aspects of Thanksgiving dinner preparation. This is where the show's commitment to and specificity of character pays off. This isn't just the story of a grump and an eccentric tromping through the snow. It's the story of Bob and Gayle, with all that suggests from everything we've learned about them in episodes past. That makes all the difference." Sean Fitz-Gerald from Vulture gave the episode a mixed review by saying, "Although the premise of the episode was predictable, the writing and voice acting, and all the beautiful quirkiness therein, saved "Bob Sled" from becoming a forgettable episode. Sure, it's another 20-minute installment of Bob-Thanksgiving sadism. Sure, most of the Bob we saw in this episode was the Bob we've seen in many other episodes, especially the Thanksgiving ones. (Truly nothing new there.) But the zany exploration of Gayle made it worthwhile: We learned she's an underrated manipulator, she's great at making toasts, and, most important, she's either really into Mr. Frond or her infatuation with Bob is yet another psychotic joke just for her own amusement."

The episode received a 1.4 rating and was watched by a total of 3.13 million people. This made it the second most watched show on Fox that night.
