= The Last Gingerbread House on the Left =

- Bob's Burgers episode
- Episode no.: Season 7 Episode 7
- Directed by: Chris Song
- Written by: Nora Smith
- Production code: 6ASA18
- Original air date: November 27, 2016

Guest appearances
- Pamela Adlon as Olsen Benner; Zach Galifianakis as Felix; Andy Daly as Samuel; Andrés du Bouchet as Randolph; David Herman as August and Oscar; Kevin Kline as Mr. Fischoeder

Episode chronology
← Previous "The Quirkducers"	Next → "Ex Mach Tina"
- Bob's Burgers season 7

"The Last Gingerbread House on the Left" is the seventh episode of the seventh season of the animated comedy series Bob's Burgers and the overall 114th episode. It was written by Nora Smith and directed by Chris Song. It aired on Fox in the United States on November 27, 2016. In the episode, Bob gets involved in a gingerbread house competition when Mr. Fischoeder asks him to bring food to his house. Meanwhile, Linda and Teddy take the kids caroling to spread holiday cheer. The title alludes to the 1972 horror film The Last House on the Left.

== Plot ==
Bob and Linda worry about the kids' Christmas lists and their low funds for buying presents. Linda gets the entire family to go caroling out in the suburbs, hoping that they'll get residents to join them. Before they leave, Mr. Fischoeder calls on Bob to attend a secret get-together. It turns out to be a secret gingerbread house building contest Mr. Fischoeder and his rich, eccentric friends engage in as part of a Christmas tradition. The winner gets the group prize paid for by the contestants. This year, the prize is a paid for cuddle session with the zoo's newborn albino polar bear cub. Mr. Fischoeder, having lost every year previous, has Bob enter and intentionally lose so that he will no longer be a loser. He offers Bob one month's free rent and Bob agrees.

Meanwhile, Linda, Teddy, and the kids go caroling, but find the residents uninterested in joining or offering things like cider or hot cocoa. They pass one eerie house that Teddy claims belongs to a man who is a murderer. The owner eventually comes out, terrifying them, but ends up being a kind man and wonderful carol singer named Oscar. After wowing them, Oscar invites them in for hot cocoa.

At the contest, Bob's gingerbread house building skills impress Mr. Fischoeder's friends, causing Mr. Fischoeder to lash out in jealousy with insults. Bob pulls him aside and when Mr. Fischoeder refuses to apologize, Bob resolves to actually use his skills to win the contest and give the kids the gift of cuddling with the polar bear cub. As the gingerbread houses enter judging, Mr. Fischoeder pulls out a gun and shoots Bob's house apart. This causes his friends to also shoot one another's houses. The houses are destroyed, and Bob tells the others of Fischeoder's deal. His friends are surprisingly impressed by his plan. Bob apologizes to Mr. Fischoeder and tells them that he finds their traditional contest to be a sweet way to be together with chosen family during Christmas. The judge deems Bob's gingerbread house the one least destroyed and declares him the winner. Bob surprises the kids with the cuddle session prize, but also invites Mr. Fischoeder and his contest friends to join them.

== Reception ==
Alasdair Wilkins from The A.V. Club gave the episode an "A−" and wrote that "Any episode that finds Bob tangling with Mr. Fischoeder over rent is bound to have an unhappy ending, with Bob’s damned principles or love of his family keeping him from recognizing a good deal when he sees one, but thankfully the holiday spirit is enough to see this particular entry through."

The episode received a 1.1 rating and was watched by a total of 2.44 million people.
