= The Horse Rider-er =

- Bob's Burgers episode
- Episode no.: Season 6 Episode 17
- Directed by: Tyree Dillihay
- Written by: Nora Smith
- Production code: 6ASA02
- Original air date: May 15, 2016

Guest appearances
- Paul Rudd as Jericho; Brooke Dillman as Doris; Sarah Silverman as Ollie; Laura Silverman as Andy; Jenny Slate as Tammy; David Herman as Tammy's Dad

Episode chronology
← Previous "Bye Bye Boo Boo"	Next → "Secret Admiral-irer"
- Bob's Burgers season 6

"The Horse Rider-er" is the 17th episode of the sixth season of the animated comedy series Bob's Burgers and the overall 105th episode, and is written by Nora Smith and directed by Tyree Dillihay. It aired on Fox in the United States on May 15, 2016. In the episode, Tina finally gets to attend horse camp, but realizes she must part ways with her imaginary horse, Jericho. Meanwhile, Linda creates a restaurant camp in order to even things out between Gene and Louise.

This episode was nominated for an Emmy Award in the category of Outstanding Animated Program.

== Plot ==
Tina has been dreaming of going to a $2000 Montana horse camp and becomes despondent when her parents can't afford it. She dreams of her imaginary horse, Jericho, and they talk about how they met. Louise and Gene bring up their sister's oddness and they all decide to put off repairing their large fryer, and use the money to send Tina to a more affordable and closer horse camp.

After bidding goodbye to Jericho, and getting a sobbing tantrum from her imaginary horse, Tina finally arrives at the horse camp and is surprised to see Tammy and Jocelyn there. She answers every question the horse instructor has and is assigned a horse named Plops to ride. Tina is not completely in love with the horse and it does not seem to like her. She attempts to win Plops over but on exhibition day, she loses control of the horse and gets knocked off mid-gallop.

While Tina was at horse camp, Linda made up a restaurant camp for Gene and Louise so they wouldn't feel like they were left out. Bob objects to Linda's camp equipment in the dining area and Teddy is not happy that the fryer is broken and he can't get French Fries. Linda overhears Tina and Gene saying they only agreed to restaurant camp because it was better than working. When camp is cancelled, they realize they actually liked it and do a little song and dance skit to get it un-cancelled.

The family head to Tina's camp to watch her ride Plops in the exhibition. Tina finds her way back from the woods in time to take her turn riding in front of all the campers' parents. She decides to ride her imaginary horse, Jericho, because she preferred riding a horse that loves her. Initially the crowd is shocked, with Bob incredulous at spending all that money on camp for her to run around the track pretending to be on a horse, but her happiness and her proper form wins the small crowd over.

== Reception ==
Alasdair Wilkins of The A.V. Club gave the episode a B, he explained his rating by saying, "“The Horse Rider-er” is a solid episode, and one that I liked more than my critique of the main story might suggest. This is a good example of a pleasant, effective Bob's Burgers episode, one that doesn't necessarily do anything egregiously wrong but also doesn't quite do those crucial things right that would push the episode into that next echelon. But hey, we’ve got Teddy freaking out over the fryer situation, Bob going all-in on his role as the camp's owner, the world's most bored riding instructor, and Paul Rudd as the voice of Tina's imaginary horse. I can only argue against an episode with all that so much, you know?"

The episode received a 1.0 rating and was watched by a total of 2.27 million people.
