= Lice Things Are Lice =

- Bob's Burgers episode
- Episode no.: Season 6 Episode 10
- Directed by: Brian Loschiavo
- Written by: Greg Thompson
- Production code: 5ASA19
- Original air date: March 13, 2016

Guest appearances
- Samantha Bee as Nurse Liz; Brian Huskey as Regular Sized Rudy; Bobby Tisdale as Zeke; Jenny Slate as Tammy Larsen; David Herman as Mr. Frond, Marshmallow; Laura Silverman as Andy Pesto; Sarah Silverman as Ollie Pesto; Tim Meadows as Mike; Billy Eichner as Mr. Ambrose

Episode chronology
← Previous "Sacred Couch"	Next → "House of 1000 Bounces"
- Bob's Burgers season 6

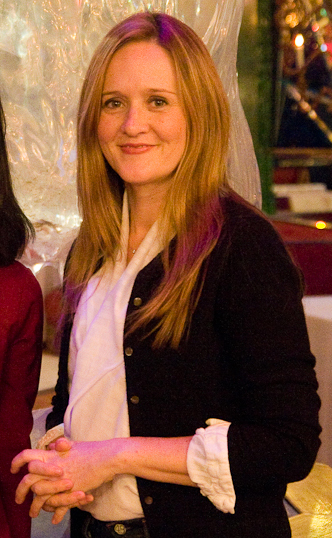
Samantha Bee (February 2011)

"Lice Things Are Lice" is the tenth episode of the sixth season of the American animated comedy series Bob's Burgers and the 98th episode overall. It was directed by Brian Loschiavo and written by Greg Thompson. Its guest stars are Samantha Bee as Nurse Liz, Brian Huskey as Regular Sized Rudy, Bobby Tisdale as Zeke, Jenny Slate as Tammy Larsen, David Herman as Mr. Frond and Marshmallow, Tim Meadows as Mike the mailman, Billy Eichner as Mr. Ambrose and Laura and Sarah Silverman who voice Andy and Ollie Pesto respectively. It first aired in the United States on Fox Network on March 13, 2016. In this episode, the Belcher children have to deal with a lice outbreak at school where Tina assists the nurse Liz while their parents implement new bar stool cushions at the restaurant.

== Plot ==
Tina Belcher assists the school nurse Liz in order to get a Girl Scout badge. Louise fakes a fever to avoid a pop quiz and is sent to the nurse's office. Tammy Larson, Zeke, Gene Belcher and Regular Sized Rudy also go there for multiple reasons. Tammy has a new hat she wears at school and the children, except Tina, try out her hat. Louise is forced to wear it over her bunny-ears hat. Liz notices that Tammy scratches her head and after a closer look she diagnoses head lice on Tammy and on everyone else who wore her hat. Liz then declares her office to be quarantined, so nobody is allowed to leave. Liz and Tina each wear a rubber glove on their heads for protection against the lice. Tina takes Tammy's smartphone and looks at the selfies, searching for all the other people Tammy had head contact with. Those children, including Lenny DeStefano and the twins Andy and Ollie Pesto, are paged to come to the nurse's office via the school's television station.

Liz goes to her computer to look for a cure and later announces that the only effective cure is to shave the infected kids' heads bald and to burn all their hats. The children do not want to let this happen to them, especially Louise fears that she will not only lose her hair but also her beloved bunny-ears hat, which is irreplaceable to her. Mr. Frond comes into the nurse's office because he heard the students screaming. After Liz explains that there is a lice outbreak, he suggests to call the parents and sent the children home, but Liz is afraid that they have "super lice" which parents cannot handle properly. Tina notices that Mr. Frond also took a photo with Tammy and therefore is infected, too. Liz starts to shave his head against his will but has problems doing it because his hair is really thick. So she decides to shave the kids first, starting with Louise. Louise takes the rubber glove off of Liz's head and makes Tammy's head touch Liz's, therefore Liz shaves her own head bald. The students, including Tina, manage to escape the office and run away. Louise and Tammy head for a different direction and hide in the school library. Louise takes a medical encyclopedia from a bookshelf to learn about lice.

Both hear via the public address system that all the other infected children were caught and Liz is going to shave them. After the librarian, Mr. Ambrose, left, Louise takes Tammy and the book she just read to the nurse's office because she has a plan. There Louise explains that Tammy has dandruff instead and shows Liz the page in the encyclopedia saying that dandruff can be misdiagnosed as head lice but Liz notes that Tammy has both. Then Tina notices that Liz usually wears glasses and tells the nurse to read the book Louise brought. After Liz says she does not need to read it, Tina makes it clear Liz cannot read without her glasses and therefore would not be able to see any lice. Liz discloses that she made up the lice outbreak so the children are free to leave the office.

Meanwhile, Bob and Linda Belcher get new cushions installed for the bar stools in their restaurant but the new ones make fart noises every time someone sits on them. They call the producer but get told that the cushions just do that until they are broken in. Then a man comes inside and says that he decided to organize a funeral meal in there, so they have to break them in very quickly. Mike the mailman has the idea of giving free beer to everyone who sits on a stool and breaks in the new cushion which Bob and Linda do.

== Reception ==
Alasdair Wilkins of The A.V. Club gave the episode a "B" and wrote that it "is a solid episode, and very definitely a more conventional entry than last week’s rambling 'Sacred Couch,' but it feels like it misses a crucial beat in its storytelling." It would have been a better plot if Louise was "blase about the whole quarantine thing, reasoning that a couple hours with a daffy nurse is still better than taking that pop quiz or just going to class in general. Such a response would feel just as valid and in-character as what we actually get here, and it then would mean something when Louise realizes she might not get out of here with her bunny ears intact." He also noted that the "main plot is helped considerably by Samantha Bee’s nicely unhinged performance as Nurse Liz, as Bee makes her character’s frustrations with the kids' non-maladies simultaneously sympathetic and disquieting. It's difficult to blame her for being annoyed by the kids' transparent abuse of the nurse's office, yet from the start she hints at how little she cares about anything other than furthering her own inherently go-nowhere career."
