= The Land Ship =

- Bob's Burgers episode
- Episode no.: Season 6 Episode 2
- Directed by: Jennifer Coyle
- Written by: Holly Schlesinger; H. Jon Benjamin
- Production code: 5ASA11
- Original air date: October 11, 2015

Guest appearances
- David Herman as Mr. Frond; Jay Johnston as Jimmy Pesto; Jenny Slate as Tammy; Bobby Tisdale as Zeke; Billy Eichner as Mr. Ambrose; Nathan Fielder as Jordan Cagan

Episode chronology
← Previous "Sliding Bobs"	Next → "The Hauntening"
- Bob's Burgers season 6

"The Land Ship" is the second episode of the sixth season of the animated comedy series Bob's Burgers and the overall 90th episode, and is written by Holly Schlesinger and H. Jon Benjamin and directed by Jennifer Coyle. It aired on Fox in the United States on October 11, 2015. In the episode, Bob thinks the upcoming Land Ship parade will increase business—until he learns that several Port-a-Potties will be in front of his restaurant; Tina's friends tell her she is boring.

== Plot ==
The students of Wagstaff school are in the auditorium getting ready to watch a play about the Land Ship, which is famous in their town. There's a quick announcement about graffiti that has recently been found at school of a little ghost dubbed "Ghost Boy", then the story the Land Ship is told.

According to a male re-enactor (who is dressed as a 13 year old girl) during the War of 1812 a 13 year old girl, named Patience Headbottom, came up with the idea to drag their only ship to land and trick the attacking British soldiers into thinking the ship was still at sea, causing the British ship to crash. Tina's friends leave the play early and call Tina boring when she protests their leaving.

After renewing a library book, Tina sees a little graffiti ghost inside a book cover and finds out Ghost Boy is a student named Jordan Cagan. Instead of turning him in, she sneaks out at night to help him graffiti little ghosts all over the place and prove she's not as boring as her friends think. After several nights out, Jordan develops feelings for Tina and asks her to help tag the Land Ship's sail the night before the parade. Tina hesitates and is tired but reluctantly agrees.

Louise tries to figure out what's going on with Tina, who confesses to her and Gene what she's done and who Ghost Boy is. Tina is upset about ruining the parade and together the Belcher kids go to the Land Ship to paint over the graffiti ghost, narrowly avoiding the British re-enactors. The next morning, Jordan finds out what she did and is upset and heartbroken, until another girl overhears him say he's Ghost Boy and she asks to hang out. Although Tina loses her graffiti boyfriend, she gains the respect of her friends and interest from Jimmy Jr.

In the meantime, Bob is upset that port-a-potties are parked in front of his restaurant as part of the Land Ship parade route. He tries to call City Hall to get them moved but to no avail. When he, Linda, and Teddy try to move them at night, they barely manage to make them wobble and give up. On the day of the parade, they realize the long lines for the port-a-potties mean potential customers and they take orders from people on line, ultimately turning a smelly situation into satisfying success.

== Reception ==
Alasdair Wilkins of The A.V. Club gave the episode a B−, saying, "“The Land Ship” represents Bob's Burgers telling a story in an intentionally minor key, and that choice left the show with less margin for error than usual. The result isn't bad, but it's definitely not the show at its most memorable or most energetic." Sean Fitz-Gerald from Vulture gave the episode a mixed review by saying, "As much as I enjoyed Tina doing her freak-out noise on the sail, I felt like we didn't actually get a whole lot of her deep idiosyncracies, which usually make these episodes (e.g., "The Equestranauts") the best, here — especially for an installment that was supposed to be about her learning a life lesson and maturing. (In other words, I felt like I had kind of seen this episode before.)."

The episode received a 0.9 rating and was watched by a total of 2.19 million people. This made it the fifth most watched show on Fox that night.
