= Pro Tiki/Con Tiki =

- Bob's Burgers episode
- Episode no.: Season 6 Episode 15
- Directed by: Brian Loschiavo
- Written by: Jon Schroeder
- Production code: 6ASA03
- Original air date: April 24, 2016

Guest appearances
- Chris Parnell as Warren Fitzgerald; Craig Anton as Mr Dowling

Episode chronology
← Previous "The Hormone-iums"	Next → "Bye Bye Boo Boo"
- Bob's Burgers season 6

"Pro Tiki/Con Tiki" is the 15th episode of the sixth season of the animated comedy series Bob's Burgers and the overall 103rd episode, and is written by Jon Schroeder and directed by Brian Loschiavo. It aired on Fox in the United States on April 24, 2016. In the episode, Bob's friend, Warren, comes to town and makes an offer to invest in the restaurant, which could use a much-needed makeover, but their decorating ideas do not go well with each other. Meanwhile, Gene gives up his bedroom to houseguest Warren.

== Plot ==
Bob's wealthy old high school friend, Warren, comes to town and is offered a place at the Belcher residence. Gene has to give up his room and sleeps by the window in the living room. When Warren tries one of Bob's burgers, he's impressed by the flavor and surprised at how little success he's had with it. Warren offers Bob $100,000 and he and his family are all excited over the opportunity.

Teddy is brought in to help convert Bob's restaurant into a tiki-themed eatery. Bob is not a fan of it but Warren insists it's a good hook and he already got most of the decorations at a going-out-of-business sale. Bob tries to grin and bear it but the talking pineapple on the decorative volcano gets on his nerves and despite getting customers who were intrigued by the vibrant tiki decor, Bob wants to return the money and the restaurant back to how it was. His kids are shocked and Warren refuses to take the money back but Bob goes to his bank and gets a cashier check.

Though his children protest and his old friend physically wrestles him to stop him from returning the check, Bob finally manages to give the check back and learns that Warren envied Bob's family, which is worth more than all the money he had amassed after high school. Warren leaves and Gene gets his room back but not before Louise gets a chance to spend the night and in the living room and watch TV like Gene had done. Unfortunately for her Bob hid the remote and Louise's bad night comes to a close.

== Reception ==
Alasdair Wilkins of The A.V. Club gave the episode a C+, he explained his rating by saying, "The result in both cases is a curiously lifeless episode, as the sluggish narrative construction doesn't provide the right kind of environment for the jokes to produce more than occasional chuckles. There's a version of this episode that is an all-time great, but it would likely need to be a daring story, one that subverts audience expectations and mines much of its humor from those apparent incongruities. Hell, maybe this needed to be a two-parter: I could see myself being far more on board with the slow burn of Bob's issues if it had led to a cliffhanger as, say, Warren went to war with Bob over control of his restaurant, rather than a pat ending and a quick reset."

The episode received a 1.1 rating and was watched by a total of 2.35 million people.
