= Bob Actually =

- Bob's Burgers episode
- Episode no.: Season 7 Episode 9
- Directed by: Chris Song
- Written by: Steven Davis; Kelvin Yu
- Production code: 6ASA22
- Original air date: February 12, 2017

Guest appearances
- Stephanie Beatriz as Chloe Barbash; Daniel Van Kirk as Flips Whitefudge; Gabrielle Sanalitro as Isabella; David Herman as Mr. Frond and Martin; Melissa Galsky as receptionist and Ms. Jacobson; Sarah Baker as Ms. Selbo; Brian Huskey as Regular Sized Rudy; Brooke Dillman as Shelly; Jenny Slate as Tammy Larsen; Bobby Tisdale as Zeke

Episode chronology
← Previous "Ex Mach Tina"	Next → "There's No Business Like Mr. Business Business"
- Bob's Burgers season 7

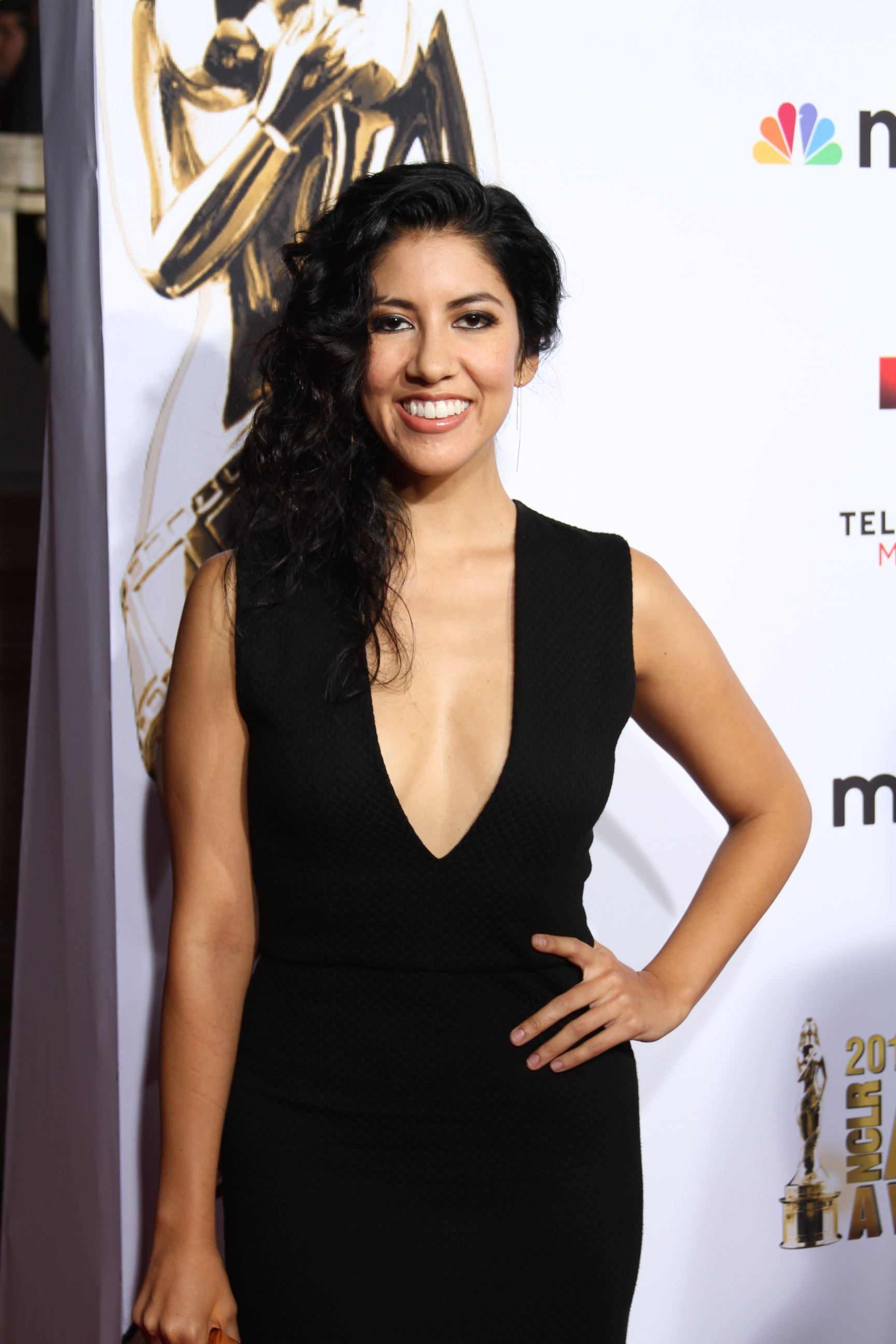
Stephanie Beatriz (2014)

"Bob Actually" is the ninth episode of the seventh season of the American animated television series Bob's Burgers, and the 116th episode overall. It was written by Steven Davis and Kelvin Yu, and directed by Chris Song. Stephanie Beatriz, Daniel Van Kirk, Gabrielle Sanalitro, and Brooke Dillman guest star. The episode originally aired on February 12, 2017.

== Plot ==
On Valentine's Day, Regular Sized Rudy asks Louise (Kristen Schaal) if she will be at the cafeteria during lunch, which she affirms. He then buys a bouquet of "love weeds" from Zeke, concerning Louise that he could be in love with her. During lunch Rudy requests her to give the bouquet and a card to Chloe Barbash. Louise agrees to do so, initially feeling relieved that he is in love with someone else. When Rudy shows Louise the note he got from Chloe, Louise realizes that Chloe just uses him for quiz answers. Louise calls Chloe out about it, and tries to get her to kiss Rudy, which Chloe refuses to do. Louise explains to Rudy that Chloe is not in love with him outside on the playground, before kissing him herself. Louise slaps Rudy and demands he keep the kiss secret.

Meanwhile, Tina Belcher (Dan Mintz) has struggled with diarrhea after winning a chili eating contest with her siblings the evening before, and thus can not participate in the "sky kiss" with Jimmy Pesto Jr, in which they would kiss while bouncing on a trampoline. She finds a pair of stilts, with the plan to kiss Jimmy Jr. while he jumps. Gene (Eugene Mirman) bonds with the cafeteria substitute kitchen lady, and helps her make chocolate for her boyfriend Francesco.

Bob (H. Jon Benjamin) has not gotten a present for Linda (John Roberts), so Teddy (Larry Murphy) offers to help. The two take a hip hop dance class, and subsequently convince the instructor to perform with them in front of the restaurant, as Bob's gift to Linda.

== Reception ==
Alasdair Wilkins from The A.V. Club gave the episode an "A" and wrote that the "sequence pays off Tina and Jimmy Jr.'s now basically official romance with one hell of a Valentine's Day kiss, gives Bob and Linda a sweet moment after the deeply silly hip-hop dance gift, lets a few of the town's other assorted weirdos get in some of their own canoodling… oh, and that's right, just goes ahead and makes Louise and Regular-Sized Rudy a real, honest-to-goodness thing, something I've been calling for since I started reviewing the show." About Louise and Regular Sized Rudy he added that the "show has teased something between these two—at least in the sense that Louise had never purposefully tried to kill or otherwise harm Rudy, which counts as a serious soft spot by her standards—since their museum-exploring, train-robbing early days. Yet for all my jokes about it, the show has never actually suggested a romance before, which makes it all the more impressive how quickly they commit to the idea once it's out there. The episode cleverly subverts Louise's—and at least some of the audience's—expectations by having Rudy actually carry a torch for someone else, which lets Louise move from weird, bad feelings like attraction and love and into much clearer, easier emotions like jealousy and rage."

The episode received a 0.8 rating and was watched by a total of 1.67 million people.

For this episode, the show won a Primetime Emmy Award in the category Outstanding Animated Program. It is the show's second Primetime Emmy Award after the episode "Mazel-Tina" won in 2014.
