= Ex Mach Tina =

- Bob's Burgers episode
- Episode no.: Season 7 Episode 8
- Directed by: Brian Loschiavo
- Written by: Greg Thompson
- Production code: 6ASA09
- Original air date: January 8, 2017

Guest appearances
- David Herman as Mr. Frond and Mr. Branca; Robert Smigel as Night Security Guard; Samantha Bee as Nurse Liz; Jenny Slate as Tammy Larsen; Bobby Tisdale as Zeke

Episode chronology
← Previous "The Last Gingerbread House on the Left"	Next → "Bob Actually"
- Bob's Burgers season 7

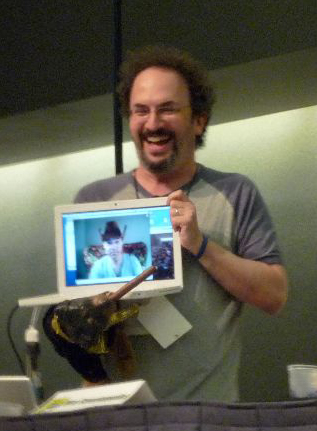
Robert Smigel (2008)

"Ex Mach Tina" is the 8th episode of the seventh season of the American animated comedy series Bob's Burgers and the 115th episode overall. It was written by Greg Thompson and directed by Brian Loschiavo. Its guest stars are David Herman as Mr. Frond and as Mr. Branca, Robert Smigel as the school's night security guard, Samantha Bee as school nurse Liz, Jenny Slate as Tammy Larsen and Bobby Tisdale as Zeke. It originally aired in the US on FOX Network at January 8, 2017. In this episode Tina hurts her ankle and uses a telecommunication robot for school, so she can stay at home. Jimmy Jr. develops a relationship to the robot version of Tina. Meanwhile Bob buys a banjo and waits for a good moment to play it.

== Plot ==
Tina wears the new high-heeled shoes to school she bought for the 8th grade bonfire on the beach but she falls and hurts her ankle. Guidance counselor Mr. Frond tells her that a company is looking to test a remote-presence robot, so she can use it to attend classes while recovering at home. While Tina is driving the robot to one of her classes, the school custodian Mr. Branca mistakes the robot for a TV set and puts it in the AV closet. Jimmy Jr. later goes into the closet to be alone and starts talking with robot-Tina. Tina and Jimmy Jr. repeatedly visit the closet to converse during Tina's recovery and he shares his intimate feelings and musical poems, which he stubbornly calls "musoems". When Jimmy Jr. brings Tina her homework, it becomes clear he is more comfortable speaking to Tina via the robot than in person.

At night, while Tina sleeps, her siblings Gene and Louise borrow the laptop that controls the robot and have some fun by wreaking havoc at their school. They also fool the school's nighttime security guard into thinking that the robot is his supervisor when he catches them.

Meanwhile, Bob buys a banjo at a thrift store. He tries playing it but he is met with derision. So he waits for a "banjo moment," a situation which calls for banjo playing.

Jimmy Jr. invites robot-Tina to the beach bonfire. Gene and Louise get the school security guard to help the robot leave the school. On the beach Jimmy Jr. kisses the camera of the Tina robot and reads his poems to his classmates. Tina decides to go there in person and her family joins her. Bob realizes his banjo moment has arrived and plays along while Jimmy Jr. reads the rest of his poems. Jimmy Jr. and Tina kiss in person while Zeke tries to dump the robot into the ocean.

== Reception ==
Alasdair Wilkins of The A.V. Club gave the episode a "B" and wrote that Jimmy Jr.'s "interest may not necessarily be in Tina herself, but rather a more selfish—albeit understandable—impulse to have someone listen to all the confused thoughts and feelings that all the musoems in the world can’t fully process. But then, Tina has always mostly wanted Jimmy Jr. for his butt and his dance moves, with personality running a distant second." He also noted that the "Jimmy Jr. of this episode doesn’t just act differently because the story needs him to in order to be maximally funny. Tonight’s version of Jimmy Jr. is a progression from what we’ve seen previously, but it’s possible to connect the dots with how he’s been used before. That attentiveness to his long-term character makes it still better when he drops new little details about his difficult home life".

The episode received a 1.5 rating and was watched by a total of 3.58 million people.
