= House of 1000 Bounces =

- Bob's Burgers episode
- Episode no.: Season 6 Episode 11
- Directed by: Tyree Dillihay
- Written by: Mike Benner
- Production code: 5ASA20
- Original air date: April 3, 2016

Guest appearances
- Brian Huskey as Regular Sized Rudy/Rudy's Dad; David Herman as Ranger Matthew Dainko; Sarah Silverman as Ollie; Laura Silverman as Andy; Katie Crown as Harley; Jessica Lowe as Dahlia; Jon Daly as Sasha; Beth Dover as Caitlin

Episode chronology
← Previous "Lice Things Are Lice"	Next → "Stand by Gene"
- Bob's Burgers season 6

"House of 1000 Bounces" is the 11th episode of the sixth season of the animated comedy series Bob's Burgers and the overall 99th episode, and is written by Mike Benner and directed by Tyree Dillihay. It aired on Fox in the United States on April 3, 2016. When a bounce house crisis occurs during Regular-Sized Rudy's birthday party, Gene, Louise, and Tina must come to the rescue. Meanwhile, Bob tries to deal with his longstanding fear of birds after a pigeon shows up in his restaurant.

== Plot ==
The Belcher kids have been invited to Rudy's birthday party in the park. Upon arriving, they find out that there was a mix-up and Rudy doesn't have a bounce house. The company thought there was a double booking because another party at the park also ordered a bounce house. Louise quickly comes up with a plan to steal the bounce house. With the help of Sasha, who happens to be the cousin of Dahlia, the party girl, the kids push the bounce house into the lake. Since no one from Dahlia's party will go into the lake, the kids get to bounce to their hearts' delight. However, Dahlia and her friends find boats to row out to the floating bounce house. They then let all the air out of the inflatable, and the park ranger comes by to "arrest" everyone at Rudy's party. At the ranger station, Rudy starts crying because this isn't what he wanted for his party - he wanted to make spoon puppets and act out his script. Louise, realizing that she ruined his party, gets everyone together to use items from the ranger station to put on Rudy's play.

Meanwhile, at the restaurant, Bob, Linda and Teddy are dealing with a pigeon that managed to get into the store, causing Bob to become extremely distressed. It is later revealed that he had a fear of birds when he was young. Linda and Teddy point out that his traumatic memory is nothing more than a scene from the movie The Birds. Bob quickly gets over his fear and tries to get the bird out of the store himself. The bird becomes covered in olive oil, leaving him unable to fly. The local animal rescue tells them to bathe the pigeon. Bob decides to get into the tub with the bird, making him less afraid of it.

== Reception ==
Alasdair Wilkins of The A.V. Club gave the episode an A, who went on to say, "I've said before I’m more of a fan of episodes that intermix the adults and the kids, so it's a testament to just how well these two episodes work—particularly in their primarily plotlines with the kids—that both stand out as season-best efforts for the show. After a couple weeks that felt an odd combination of listless and experimental, this is Bob's Burgers leaning on what has always set it apart from its current Fox animation stablemates, namely its commitment to characters and relationships. All that's left now is to debate which is the most perfect pairing: Louise and Rudy, Gene and Zeke, or Bob and that pigeon."

The episode received a 1.0 rating and was watched by a total of 2.05 million people.
