= Daniel Van Kirk =

Comedian

- Born: Daniel Nall; Rochelle, Illinois

Comedy career
- Years active: 2009–present
- Medium: Stand-up

Daniel Van Kirk (born Daniel Nall) is an American comedian, podcast personality, and writer from Rochelle, Illinois.

== Early life and education ==
Van Kirk earned his Bachelor of Fine Arts in theater performance from Roosevelt University.

== Career ==
=== Sketch and stand-up comedy ===
Van Kirk is a performer at UCB's Maude Night as a member of team Tut. Other Tut members include actors Molly Jane Bretthauer, David Brown, Hesley Harps, Marques Ray, and Alison Rich and writers Eric Cunningham, John Ford, Joey Clift, Joe Porter, and Ryan Hitchcock.

Van Kirk has performed at South by Southwest, Riot: LA Comedy Fest, Meltdown Comics, Set List Live, and Just For Laughs Festival in Montreal.

=== Podcasts ===
Van Kirk currently co-hosts The Pen Pals Podcast alongside fellow comedian Rory Scovel, and Dumb People Town with Randy and Jason Sklar.

He appears as himself and as comedic caricatures on several podcasts such as Sklarbro Country with Randy and Jason Sklar as a regular, The Bear Down Podcast, and The Todd Glass Show. He also hosts Hindsight with Daniel Van Kirk on the Steve Dahl Network.

Van Kirk has appeared on Doug Benson's podcast, Doug Loves Movies, in character as Mark Wahlberg. A mini-game on the podcast is "Doing Lines with Mark", in which Van Kirk - either in person or via recording - recites a film quote as Wahlberg, and a contestant must name the film from which the quote originates. Van Kirk has also appeared on the podcast in character as Steven Seagal.

=== Thanks Diane ===
In November 2019, Van Kirk released his debut comedy album, Thanks Diane, on Blonde Medicine. It was recorded at UCB's Franklin Theatre in Los Angeles.

=== Rose Gold ===
In April 2024, Van Kirk released his new special, Rose Gold, named for his grandmother, Rosemary Van Kirk. Recorded at the Lincoln Lodge in Chicago, it is an all new hour.

=== Wine Club ===
Van Kirk stars in the film Wine Club, released in December 2023.
