= The Hauntening =

- Bob's Burgers episode
- Episode no.: Season 6 Episode 3
- Directed by: Jennifer Coyle
- Written by: Steven Davis and Kelvin Yu
- Production code: 5ASA13
- Original air date: October 18, 2015

Guest appearance
- Max Greenfield as Boo Boo

Episode chronology
← Previous "The Land Ship"	Next → "Gayle Makin' Bob Sled"

"The Hauntening" is the third episode of the sixth season of the American animated comedy series Bob's Burgers and the 91st episode overall. It was written by Steven Davis and Kelvin Yu who won an Annie Award, and was directed by Jennifer Coyle. Guest star is Max Greenfield who voices boyband member Boo Boo. It first aired in the United States on October 18, 2015 at Fox Network. In this episode, the Belcher family goes to a haunted house on Halloween, where the parents want to scare their children, especially Louise.

== Plot ==
In the family restaurant Bob and Linda Belcher tell their regular customer Teddy that they go to a haunted house with their children every year on Halloween. Louise, however, who would love to genuinely be scared, does not look forward to this, as she finds Haunted Houses boring and predictable. The parents explain that they have planned something to scare her themselves this time. Louise asks her siblings Tina and Gene if they know anything about it, which they deny.

Linda and Bob show the children around the haunted house, but do not succeed in scaring them. Louise gets the idea to scare the parents, and the children hide in a pile of leaves in the garden and jump out of it when their parents frantically come looking. The family decides to go home, but discover there is not enough air in one of the car tires. As Bob tries to dial a tow truck, they see a man standing silently in the street wielding hedge trimmers. When he doesn't respond to their questions, they quickly shuffle back into the house. As the power goes out, they hear strange sounds from the basement, and go downstairs looking for the source. When a monstrous cry sends them back upstairs, they're stopped at the front door by the man with the shears trying to force his way in. Desperate, the family runs upstairs and locks themselves in the bathroom, avoiding a room containing only a chair on which sits a doll with twigs coming out of its eyes. Moments later, they hear heavy footsteps coming up the stairs, and as the strange man attempts to enter the bathroom, the family climbs through the window to the projecting roof. Attempting to call for help, Bob drops his phone from the roof just as Three hooded figures appear on the lawn outside, and a large circle of grass seemingly catches fire around the house. Trapped with no way out, a flustered Louise turns to see the strange man in the open window behind her, and screams with fear... just as Gene snaps a photograph of her. Confused, Louise soon learns from her family that it all was a trick to get her scared, with even Gene and Tina privy to the plan.

While the children scared their parents in the garden, Teddy deflated the tire (and, to Bob's dismay, cut the car's brake line). Mort was in the basement making the strange sounds, caused by him accidentally throwing out his back while trying to pick up a large sledgehammer. The house belongs to Mort's mother, and her boyfriend is the man who scared Louise. Ecstatic, Louise thanks her family. After the Belchers go back home, they watch the music video of "I Love U So Much (It's Scary)" by the boyband Boyz 4 Now from the episode of the same name.

== Reception ==
Alasdair Wilkins of The A.V. Club gave this episode a "B" and wrote: "Over the course of the episode, though, [Louise] shifts, first to her more familiar hellion role and then into what she fundamentally is, which is a little kid, and in this case a scared little kid. This is also a great episode for Louise being brutally honest in her comments and provoking similar candor right back: Look at how readily Bob admits that, yeah, being old is scary, or that the kids jumping out of a bunch of leaves was way more effective than his and Linda’s elaborate haunted house. Those exchanges would be amusing enough if they were just between two strangers, but it becomes properly hilarious because of our familiarity with Louise and Bob’s personalities, perspectives, and mannerisms, not to mention Schaal’s and H. Jon Benjamin’s performance."

Steven Davis and Kelvin Yu received an Annie Award in the category "Outstanding Achievement, Writing in an Animated TV/Broadcast Production" for this episode's script.
