= Wag the Hog =

- Bob's Burgers episode
- Episode no.: Season 6 Episode 13
- Directed by: Brian Loschiavo
- Written by: Holly Schlesinger
- Production code: 5ASA22
- Original air date: April 10, 2016

Guest appearances
- Robert Ben Garant as Critter; Wendi McLendon-Covey as Mudflap; Sarah Baker as Bethany; Joe Lo Truglio as Carl; Thomas Lennon as Kenny; Melissa Bardin Galsky as Candace

Episode chronology
← Previous "Stand by Gene"	Next → "The Hormone-iums"

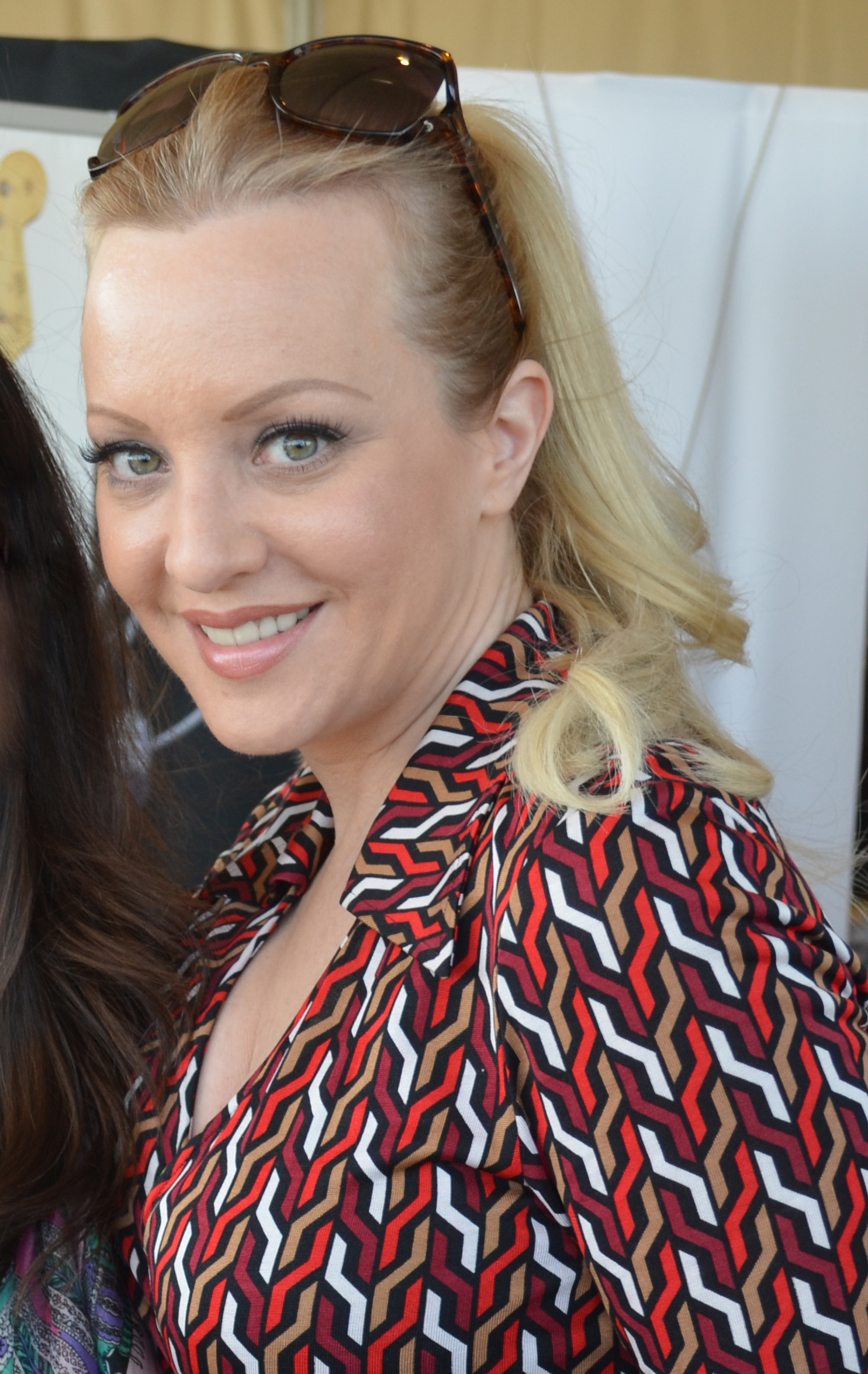
Wendi McLendon-Covey (2012)

"Wag the Hog" is the 13th episode of the sixth season of the American animated comedy series Bob's Burgers and the 101st episode overall. It was directed by Brian Loschiavo and written by Holly Schlesinger. Its guest stars are Robert Ben Garant as Critter, Wendi McLendon-Covey as Mudflap, Sarah Baker as Bethany, Joe Lo Truglio as Carl, Thomas Lennon as Kenny and Melissa Bardin Galsky as Candace. It aired in the United States on Fox Network on April 10, 2016. In this episode, Bob Belcher and his children try to get Critter out of prison by selling his motorcycle to the investment banker Kenny while Linda Belcher babysits Critter's and Mudflap's son Sidecar.

== Plot ==
Critter, the leader of the motorcycle gang "One Eyed Snakes," calls Bob Belcher, saying that he is in prison because he burned his parking tickets instead of paying them. Critter wants Bob to sell his motorcycle on his behalf to an investment banker named Kenny, and to use the money to get him out of prison. Bob refuses to help him, so Critter calls again later, telling him that he has to get out soon because of his new job, and that neither Mudflap nor his gang can help him because Mudflap is in the forest on a survival tour, and he does not spend time anymore with his gang since he became a father. The Belchers go to Critter's apartment to find the key for the motorcycle. Linda takes care of his baby Sidecar while Bob and his children Tina, Gene and Louise bring the motorcycle to Kenny.

After they got there, a man who followed them steals it. The thief turns out to be Carl, another investment banker. Bob cannot call the police because the motorcycle is built from stolen parts, but Kenny knows where Carl lives. They find Critter's motorcycle in Carl's backyard. When Carl is about to drive away, Kenny jumps on it and they have a fight until it crashes into the fence. None of them wants to buy a broken motorcycle and Louise has the idea of letting the One Eyed Snakes repair it. Kenny agrees to buy it under the condition that the gang fixes it and he gets the opportunity to meet them. First the gang refuses to fix it because their leader does not spend time with them anymore. Bob tells them they should be more considerate towards Critter. The gang agrees to repair the motorcycle and Kenny buys it.

Meanwhile, Linda takes Sidecar in his baby stroller out for a walk and brings him into an indoor playing center. She tells another mother named Bethany that it is her son named Simon. Sidecar later gets angry and throws toys at people because he did not have a nap. After Sidecar falls asleep, Linda tells Bethany what his real name is and that his father is imprisoned and his mother is in the woods. When Bethany is about to call the authorities, Linda takes Sidecar and leaves. The next day Critter and Mudflap, carrying Sidecar, come to the Belchers' restaurant thanking them for their help. Critter gives them a printer from the store where he works and Mudflap presents them a pinecone from the forest.

== Reception ==
Alasdair Wilkins from The A.V. Club gave the episode an "A−" and wrote that it "understands its own particular strengths. Other shows could take a premise like “patriarch protagonist helps his biker gang leader pseudo-friend sell a semi-stolen motorcycle” and spin it into the wildest story imaginable, and I can think of plenty of shows both animated and live-action that could nail the crazier take on this setup. But Bob’s Burgers is happy to be almost low-key in its handling of the premise, letting Critter and the Belcher kids handle the more surreal duties while Bob and the finance dorks Carl and Kenny behave more or less how you would expect an actual human to." He also noted that the episode "is so clever, because it very gradually lets Bob loosen up in a way that works primarily as a character move. As he explains at the end to the One-Eyed Snakes, the reason he had any fun today is because he had his kids with him, and we see tangible signs of that through the episode, particularly when he starts getting into character as an eyebrow-eating biker tough. Bob isn’t coy about the fact that he would rather be doing pretty much anything else but this, yet there’s also no one in the world he would rather be doing this with than his kids."
