= Sea Me Now =

- Bob's Burgers episode
- Episode no.: Season 7 Episode 2
- Directed by: Chris Song
- Written by: Dan Fybel
- Production code: 6ASA07
- Original air date: October 9, 2016

Guest appearance
- Sam Seder as Nathaniel

Episode chronology
← Previous "Flu-ouise"	Next → "Teen-a Witch"
- Bob's Burgers season 7

"Sea Me Now" is the second episode of the seventh season of the animated comedy series Bob's Burgers and the overall 109th episode, and is written by Dan Fybel and directed by Chris Song. It aired on Fox in the United States on October 9, 2016. In the episode, Teddy tries to impress his ex-wife, Denise, when the Belchers accompany him for a ride on his newly restored boat. Meanwhile, Tina takes care of Bob's restaurant eraser, in an attempt to get her own cell phone.

== Plot ==
Teddy invites the Belcher family to join him for a day on his newly refurbished boat. The Belchers agree to close the restaurant and go on a boat trip, thinking it will be a nice family outing. Meanwhile, Tina, determined to prove she’s responsible enough for a cell phone, takes on the task of caring for Bob’s chalkboard eraser from the restaurant.

At the marina, the true reason for the boat trip is revealed: Teddy is hoping to impress his ex-wife, Denise, and prove he’s thriving post-divorce. However, when the boat arrives at the seashore bar Denise works at, that plan quickly unravels, as Teddy struggles to make his ex-wife notice him. While making several trips around the marina trying to impress Denise, Teddy crashes the boat into the dock, damaging the engine. The group decides to leave. When it turns out in the middle of the sea that the boat is leaking and the damaged engine is now on fire, Teddy and the Belchers end up stranded on a nearby island overrun by a herd of Highland bulls. While running away from the bulls, Tina has to lose the eraser when almost falling off the deteriorated wooden bridge.

After climbing the rocky hills towards the mansion on top of the island, the group encounters Nathaniel, a grumpy caretaker and the sole inhabitant of the island and its estate. Nathaniel tells the group that the island was once bought by Mr. Caffrey, a rich entrepreneur trying to impress Gwendolyn, a Scottish woman he loved, only to be rejected. Bob points out the parallel between Mr. Caffrey and Teddy, but Teddy misinterprets it and briefly considers buying an island himself. Nathaniel offers everyone a ride back to the mainland on one of the estate boats, which were, to the inconvenience of the Belchers and Teddy, docked on the other side of the island.

In the end, Teddy has a moment of clarity and sets off a flare to sink his own boat, letting go of his need to prove himself to Denise. Unfortunately, the Belchers’ phones, wallets, and Teddy’s truck steering wheel were still on board of the burning boat.

== Reception ==
Alasdair Wilkins of The A.V. Club gave the episode an A−, saying, "I'm not sure that the show has really previously established Tina as someone who loses things constantly, but it feels so completely true to her character that I'm perfectly prepared to believe that's featured in every episode up to this point. As with Teddy, this is a story that unfolds more or less entirely in Tina's own head, with the rest of the family only taking a moment to mourn the inevitable demise of a much-loved eraser. There's a lovely payoff though, as Tina tells her dad that a cellphone would just distract her from all that's around her. Of course, as soon as that legitimately lovely moment passes, the family immediately turns on Bob, summarily stripping him of all screen privileges. It's that lovely mix of the sweet and the silly, the ridiculous and the mundane, that makes "Sea Me Now" such a terrific episode."

The episode received a 1.2 rating and was watched by a total of 2.79 million people.
