= Willi Hoselmann =

German sculptor

Willi Hoselmann (27 January 1890 – 1978) was a German sculptor.

== Life ==
Born in Duisburg, Hoselman studied sculpture at the Kunstakademie Düsseldorf. There he was Misterschüler of Hubert Netzer. From 1933 he was a member of the Malkasten, the Düsseldorfer Jonges and the 1949 Group. During the National Socialist era he created art in Nazi Germany. One of Hoselmann's private students was Gerda Kratz.

His son Wilhelm Hoselmann headed the building department of the city of Geldern as building director for decades.

== Works ==
- Putti and stone vases for the Düsseldorf exhibition GeSoLei, 1926-1928: stone vase Düsseldorf's cartwheeler (on the bank protection wall at Rheinpark Golzheim), Stone vases Martinszug and Die Lebensalter (on the plinth at the NRW Forum in Düsseldorfer Ehrenhof)
- Tomorrow we march, Joint design with the architect Peter Dierichsweiler for the Kriegerdenkmal des Füsilier-Regiments General Ludendorff (Niederrheinisches) No. 39, 1927 (realised by sculptor Jupp Rübsam, unveiled 1928)
- Gießerjunge, bronze figure at the corner of Zollstraße/Marktplatz in Düsseldorf, commissioned by the Düsseldorfer Jonges, erected in 1932
- with Hans Reissinger: Denkmal der Bewegung, NS monument in the form of a lying swastika on Luitpoldplatz, Bayreuth, 1934, torn down in 1935 after encroachment by Wildpinkler.
- Monument to the German Mother (Mother guiding her children into life), NS monument in the hall of honour of the House of German Education, Bayreuth, 1936
- Eagle with swastika flag, relief above the portal of the House of German Education, Bayreuth, 1936
- Memorial to Vice Admiral Maximilian Reichsgraf von Spee, above a portal at the Palais Spee (eastern wing) placed in 1936
- Fischerjungen-Brunnen from bluestone, 1938, commissioned by the Düsseldorfer Jonges for the 650th anniversary of the city of Düsseldorf, Stiftsplatz 2, Düsseldorf.
- School relief, shell limestone, above the main entrance of the school at Salierplatz (today Don-Bosco-School), Salierstraße 37, Düsseldorf-Oberkassel, 1939
- Stone figure Falconer as part of the group of figures Die Ständischen, art project for the Reichsausstellung Schaffendes Volk 1937, initially removed again, re-installed in 1941 in Nordpark Düsseldorf at the large water basin.
- Heinrich Heine Commemorative plaque at Birthplace of Heinrich Heine on Bolkerstraße, Düsseldorf, commissioned by the Düsseldorfer Jonges, 1947
- Relief Lorenz Cantador in the arcades of the Administrative Building Marktplatz 6, Düsseldorf, 1948
- Zodiac relief on the central building of the Gerling administration buildings, Von-Werth-Straße 14, Cologne, circa 1950.
- Memorial plaque for the architect Philipp Schaefer and Lyra as a memorial of the Alte Tonhalle at the Karstadt building in Schadowstraße in Düsseldorf, circa 1952.
- Decorative vase, limestone, Burggrafenstraße, Düsseldorf-Oberkassel, 1953
- Bust Friedrich Spee, on a stele east of the St.-Suitbertus-Basilika (at the rear of the Suitbertus-Gymnasium), Düsseldorf-Kaiserswerth, erected in 1959 by the Düsseldorf Jonges.
