= Gene It On =

- Bob's Burgers episode
- Episode no.: Season 4 Episode 20
- Directed by: Chris Song
- Written by: Greg Thompson
- Production code: 4ASA08
- Original air date: May 4, 2014

Guest appearances
- Kurt Braunohler as Waiter; Carrie Clifford as Monica; Billy Eichner as Mr. Ambrose; David Herman as Mr. Frond; Keegan-Michael Key as Todd; Jenny Slate as Tammy; Bobby Tisdale as Zeke

Episode chronology
← Previous "The Kids Run Away"	Next → "Wharf Horse (or How Bob Saves/Destroys the Town – Part I)"
- Bob's Burgers season 4

"Gene It On" is the 20th episode of the fourth season of the animated comedy series Bob's Burgers and the overall 65th episode, and is written by Greg Thompson and directed by Chris Song. It aired on Fox in the United States on May 4, 2014.

== Plot ==
Tina decides to try out for the cheerleading squad, but it's actually Gene who gets noticed in the crowd while cheering her on. Mr. Ambrose, the school librarian, serves as the cheerleading advisor, but hates cheerleading, because he wanted to be the drama club advisor instead. Therefore, he pushes the cheerleaders into trope-laden rivalries in order to "inject drama" into the club, exacerbating the already existing rivalry between Gene as the talented newcomer and squad captain, Todd, as the out-dated veteran leader. Ambrose continues to encourage their rivalry, resulting in a "cheer off" which Gene easily wins, becoming the new captain. Linda is delighted that Gene has become a cheerleader, vicariously living out her own failed cheerleading aspirations (particularly a memory of a high school friend named Monica who became a cheerleader and ditched her) through him with cheerleading-themed packed lunches and inane cheering routine ideas. As the new squad captain, the pressure begins to get to Gene, until Linda's incessant cheerleader talk causes him to snap and tell her that she'll never be a cheerleader and that her ideas, including an impossible cartwheeling human tower, are terrible. Linda is furious and refuses to encourage him any further.

Meanwhile, after falling and biting her tongue during her audition, Tina is unable to speak. Louise steps up to be her translator, and manages to get her a date with Jimmy Jr. Louise uses Tina's inability to speak to take advantage of Jimmy Jr., masquerading her interests as Tina's. She negotiates an expensive date at the revolving restaurant Pie In The Sky, where she orders their enormous pie sampler, eating until she vomits. She goes too far and Tina manages to communicate to Jimmy Jr. what her perfect date would have been, which Jimmy Jr. reveals is exactly what he would have wanted as well. The two kiss.

Continuing his attempts to heighten the "drama" in the club, Ambrose informs the squad that he entered them into the regional cheerleading finals and that the squad must develop a completely new winning routine in a single night all by themselves. Gene proposes a routine using robot costumes and a futuristic theme. However, on the day of the competition they discover that Ambrose leaked their routine to their rivals to force them into the "dramatic" twist of needing to come up with a last minute routine and still win. Linda reluctantly attends the competition with Bob, and to her surprise, sees Monica in the audience. She confronts Monica, only to learn that Monica does not remember her and went on to become a successful cheerleader and nice person. Meanwhile, with no options left, Gene proposes that the team use Linda's cartwheeling human tower. Recognizing the inherent danger of the routine, especially to the person at the base of the tower, Gene volunteers to be the base. Todd refuses to allow him to do so, telling him that despite their differences, he respects Gene's charisma and passion. The two reconcile. As the squad takes on the routine, Linda is delighted to see that Gene used her idea, but it becomes clear that the tower is about to predictably collapse. Ambrose runs to cushion the squad's fall, saving them from danger, claiming that he did so to fulfill the dramatic twist of the "jaded advisor with a heart of gold." Linda and Gene reconcile and Linda proposes a new impossibly dangerous routine for the squad to Bob's protests.

== Reception ==
Alasdair Wilkins of The A.V. Club gave the episode a B−, saying "Gene It On" is one of this season's weakest episodes, though that's not such a horrible thing given this year's generally high quality. And, whatever the narrative problems of its main story, this episode does strike some gold with its subplot, in which Louise volunteers to be an injured Tina's highly unreliable interpreter. At its first glance, this story is just as dumb as the episode's central plotline, but it benefits from the presence of more familiar characters. That includes Mr. Frond, who gets in a very funny cameo as someone who totally fails to grasp what an injured tongue actually means; he's a particularly good character to include in a plot like this, as voice actor David Herman's years on Futurama have made him an expert at selling more surreal gags."

Robert Ham of Paste gave the episode a 9.7 out of 10, saying "The tale of Gene, the trumped-up drama between him and Todd, and the big cheerleading competition that closes out the show almost seem anti-climactic with everything that happens before it. But the strange hints about Gene’s sexual preferences that get dropped in the mix (Todd: "You deserve the top. I’ll be the bottom"), and their failed stunt that lands them in a heap atop Mr. Ambrose, sure make for a great conclusion to one of Season Four's best episodes."

The episode received a 1.1 rating and was watched by a total of 2.23 million people. This made it the fourth most watched show on Animation Domination that night, losing to American Dad!, The Simpsons and Family Guy with 4.40 million.
