= Cartwheeling Boys =

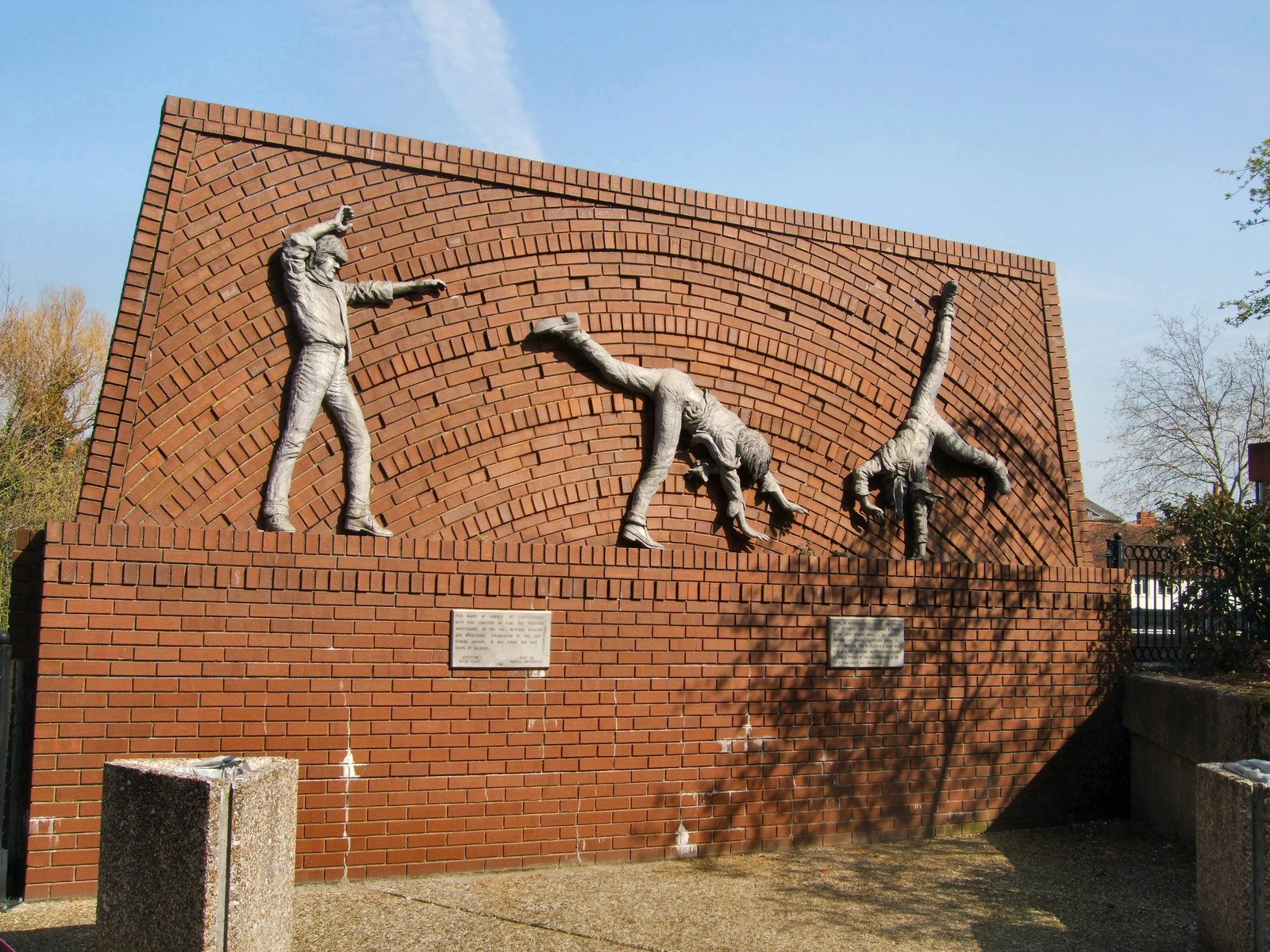
- Cartwheeling Boys in 2012
- Interactive map of Cartwheeling Boys

Cartwheeling Boys is a monumental work by British sculptor Brian Slack, erected in 1981 next to the Reading Civic Centre. The monument commemorates the 30th anniversary of the friendly relations between Reading (United Kingdom) and Düsseldorf (Germany), established in 1947.

== History ==
In 1946, Phoebe Cusden, the mayor of Reading, organized a collection in England of money, food, clothing, shoes, and other essentials to help the residents of Düsseldorf , then under British occupation. In 1947, Phoebe Cusden, the then Mayor of Reading, travelled to Düsseldorf, Germany, in response to a request by the colonel of the Royal Berkshire Regiment stationed there. Discovering that the city was suffering extreme privation, she rallied support from residents and arranged food parcels clothing and toys to go to the area. In the year after her mayoralty she invited six Düsseldorf children to stay in Reading for three months, and set up the Reading-Düsseldorf Association to continue the connection.

In 1977, a statue was commissioned to commemorate the 30th anniversary of the establishment of friendly relations. The panel depicting Düsseldorf's cartwheeler, a traditional symbol of Düsseldorf, was designed by the English sculptor Brian Slack. The figures of boys making a cartwheel were cast at Brunel University of London. In 1981, a monument was erected at the end of a small alley opposite the Reading Civic Centre building.

In mid-February 2022, when Storm Eunice hit England, the brick wall of the monument, its upper part with its figured masonry, was toppled by strong gusts of wind, and the sculptures attached to it were smashed. On February 18, the Reading press secretary, having announced to the press the destruction of the monument, immediately reported that the police had collected the fragments of the sculptures and the mayor's office would think about how to restore the monument.

Reading Central Library building (right) with recreated figures of Düsseldorf's cartwheeler on the facade, July 2026

At the end of February 2026, the sculptures were repaired and reinstalled on the façade of the building adjacent to the Reading Borough Council, where the city's new Central Library was opened in the summer of that year. The sculptures were lifted using a crane and secured in a rigid frame. The information board was funded by the Reading–Düsseldorf Association.
