= Jewish Cemetery, Aachen =

Cemetery in Aachen, Germany

Jüdischer Friedhof, Aachen Jewish Cemetery, Aachen
- Interactive map of Jüdischer Friedhof, Aachen; Jewish Cemetery, Aachen

Details
- Established: 1820
- Location: Lütticher Straße, Aachen, Germany
- Coordinates: 50.766214°N 6.072006°E
- Type: Public
- Find a Grave: Jüdischer Friedhof, Aachen; Jewish Cemetery, Aachen

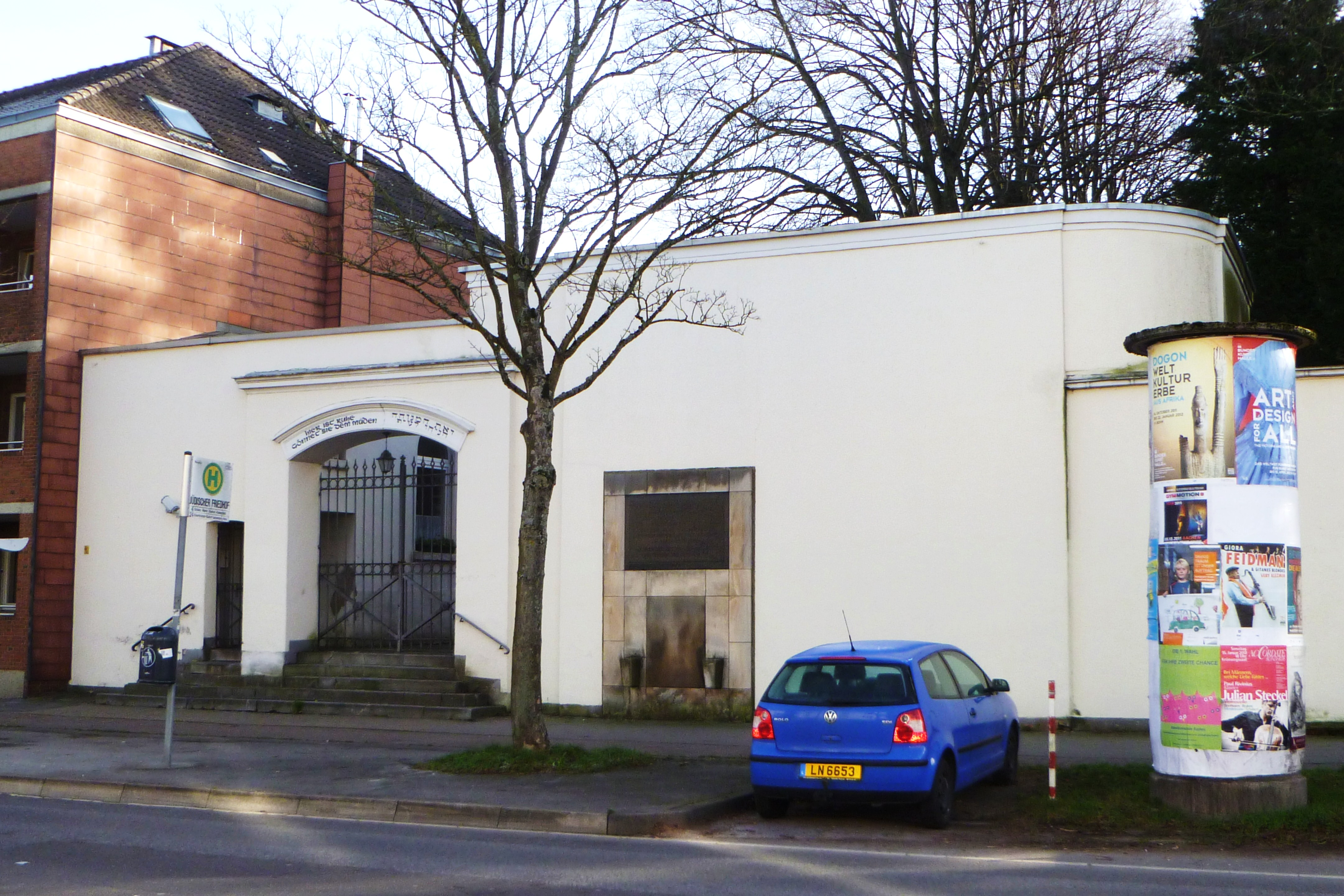
Main portal of cemetery

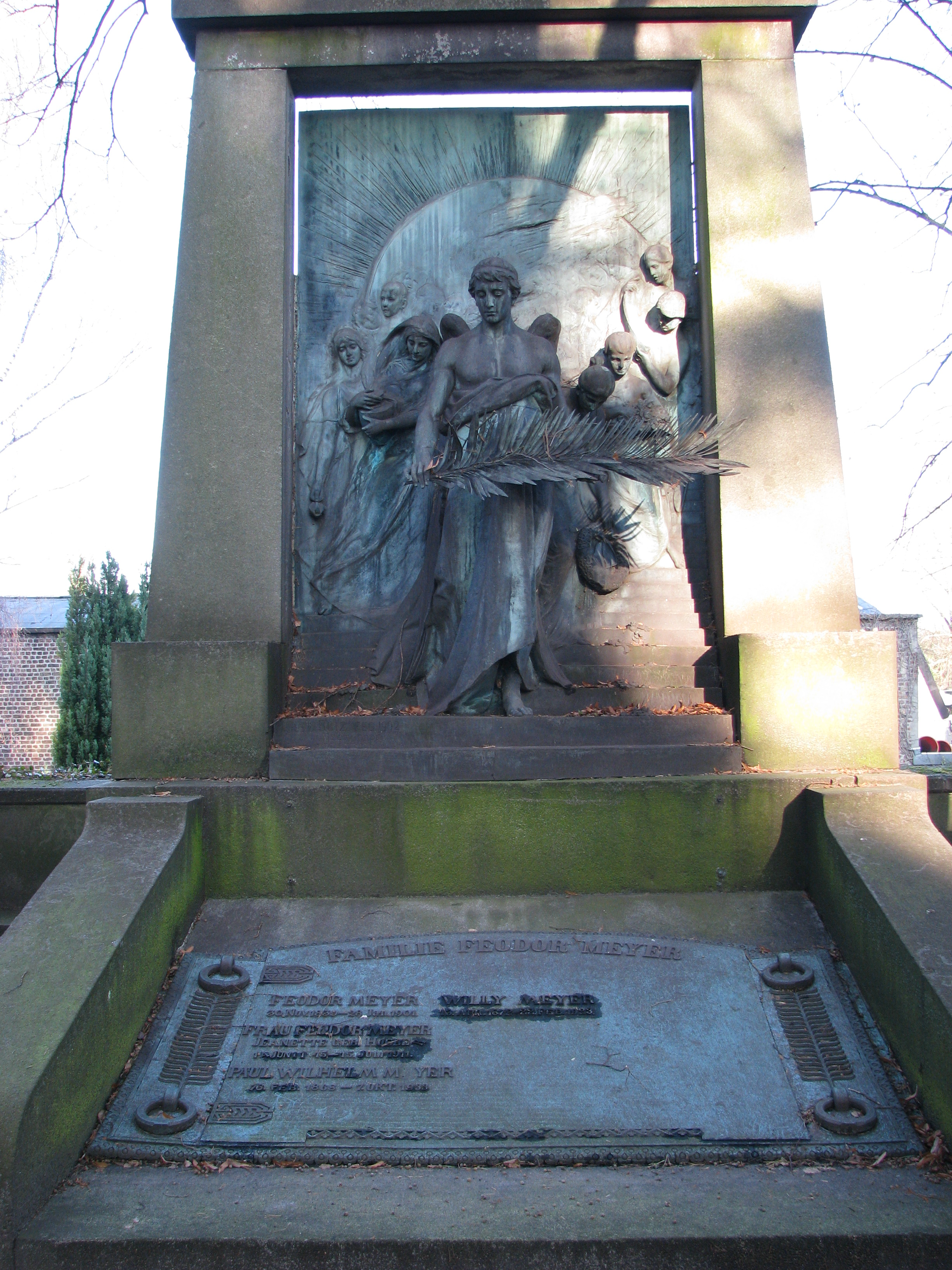
Grave of the family Feodor Meyer, designed by Gustav Rutz, bronze casting by Förster & Kracht in 1902

The Jewish Cemetery Aachen (German: Jüdischer Friedhof Lütticher Straße Aachen) is located in Aachen in North Rhine-Westphalia. It is on the corner of Lütticher Straße (English "Liège street") and Körnerstraße.

In 1820, the Jewish community in Aachen asked the district administrator to allocate a place for the burial of deceased members of the community, since at that time the dead of the Jewish community in Aachen had to be buried in Düren in the old cemetery or in the neighboring Dutch village of Vaals. The Jewish cemetery was transferred to the Jewish community of Aachen in June 1822 and used for burials from the same year. In 1865 and 1878, the site was expanded. The burial hall was completed in 1890. The oldest tombstone (mazewot) dates from 1822. In the cemetery, which is still in use today, there are 1366 tombstones for 2153 deceased (as of December 2014).

The cemetery has been desecrated several times. Most recently, on the night of 1–2 August 2010, the cemetery wall was vandalized with antisemitic smearings and Nazi symbolism.

== See also ==
- Jewish Cemetery, Eilendorf (another Jewish cemetery in Aachen)
