= Roland Weber =

German landscape architect

Roland Weber (3 March 1909 – 14 October 1997) was a German landscape architect.

== Life ==
Weber was born in Düsseldorf as the son of the self-employed engineer Karl Weber and his wife Agnes. Until 1926, he attended a Realgymnasium in Cologne, but left without graduating for financial reasons. Weber instead completed a gardener's apprenticeship at the Jürgl wholesale nursery in Sürth from 1927, where he was already making small planting drafts. From 1931, he studied at the Königliche Gärtnerlehranstalt am Wildpark bei Potsdam in Berlin-Dahlem, among others with the influential perennial gardener Karl Foerster. In 1933, he graduated as a garden technician. Weber then worked again at the Jürgl nursery, now as head of the planning department.

His first commission as a freelance garden architect was the landscape garden of the Haus Christiansen on the Elbchaussee in Altona an der Elbe in 1934 (arch. Rudolf Lodders).

In 1936 he founded his own office in Rodenkirchen. During the Second World War, Weber was drafted for military service, which he performed as a medic in Russia, among other places. After the war, Weber moved with his office to Düsseldorf, where he created numerous public and private gardens.

Weber was intensively involved with the garden art of other cultures. In 1978, he travelled to southern Spain to study Moorish architecture and garden art such as the gardens of the Generalife in the Alhambra. He also travelled to countries on other continents, such as Morocco, Iran, Thailand and Japan.

Weber lived alone and in seclusion; he died in 1997 at the age of 88 from the late effects of a fire accident in his own house. His grave is in the Linnep cemetery in Ratingen-Breitscheid. The architect Helmut Hentrich, who was a friend of his, created his gravestone. His office continues as WKM Landschaftsarchitekten Weber Klein Maas.

== Gardens ==
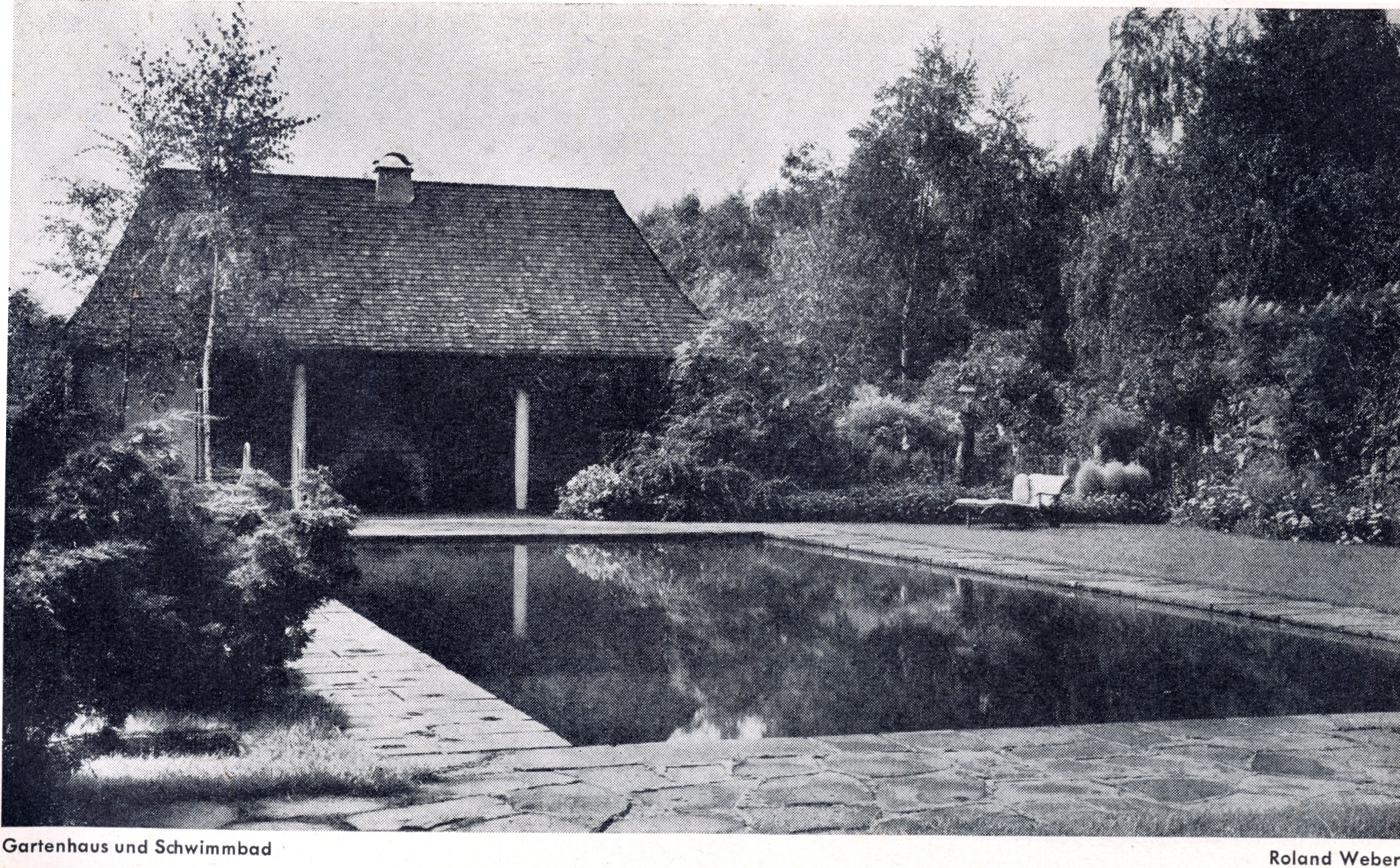
Haus Weber, architect Helmut Hentrich

- 1934: Landschaftsgarten Haus Christiansen an der Elbchaussee in Hamburg-Altona (architect: Rudolf Lodders)
- 1936: Private Garden in Uedorf near Bonn
- 1937: Hausgarten Sch. in Marienburg (Köln).
- before 1950: Garten B. in Düsseldorf.
- before 1950: Garten H. in Düsseldorf (with Theodor Merrill).
- 1952–53: Eigener Landschaftsgarten Haus Weber in Düsseldorf-Kalkum, An der alten Mühle 5.
- ca. 1954: Malkastenpark
- 1952–55: Hausgarten in Krefeld
- before 1960: Landhausgarten im Birkenhain (architekt: Hans Junghanns).
- 1954–68: Garden Langen in Meerbusch
- 1954: Garden courtyard of a private house in Düsseldorf
- 1955–57: Renker country estate in the Voreifel in Düren-Fuchsbenden
- 1957: Exhibition garden for the Bundesgartenschau 1957 in Cologne
- 1960–61: Outdoor facilities of the former casino R 55, Bayer-Werk Uerdingen, Krefeld (under monument protection)
- 1961–95: Außenanlagen der Horten-Hauptverwaltungsgebäude, Am Seestern, Düsseldorf.
- 1965: Exhibition garden for the 1965 Federal Horticultural Show in Essen.
- 1965–74: Green space planning for the Neue Stadt Wulfen
- 1967: Inner courtyard of Koerfer House in Moscia, Ascona, Ticino (architect: Marcel Breuer)
- 1968–74: Garden courtyard at Fritz-Henkel-Haus (seminar building) of Henkel KGaA, Düsseldorf
- 1969–75: Landscape garden Frowein in Wuppertal
- 1974–92: Outdoor facilities at the headquarters of TÜV Rheinland, Cologne
- 1976–78: Rhine meadows at the Oberkasseler Brücke in Düsseldorf
- 1978: Garden courtyard of a private house in Düsseldorf
- 1978: Garden courtyard at the headquarters of TÜV Rheinland, Cologne
- 1978: Parks of the Kasteel Groot Buggenum in Grathem, Limburg, Netherlands for Helmut Hentrich.
- 1981–82: Renovation of the historic castle garden of Schloss Rahe, Aachen-Laurensberg
- 1982: Mannesmann-Hochhaus AG (today Vodafone), in Düsseldorf-Carlstadt, Mannesmannufer.
- 1982: Garden courtyard south of the head office of Deutsche Bank AG, Düsseldorf
- 1984–86: Garden in Düsseldorf-Oberkassel
- 1988–90: Gardens for the new head office building of Horten AG, Am Albertussee, Düsseldorf
- 1990–92: Renovation of the historic palace garden of Horten AG, Am Albertussee, Horten AG Schloss Landsberg (Ratingen) Breitscheid

== Exhibitions ==
- Exhibition together with the architect Hans Junghanns in the Düsseldorf City Museum, November 1983 to January 1984.
- Exhibition "Roland Weber – Die Kunst des Gartens" im Schloss Benrath (Düsseldorf), July/August 2004
