= Emil Jungblut =

German sculptor

Emil Jungblut, also Emil Jungbluth written, (11 June 1888 – 24 April 1955) was a German sculptor.

== Life ==
Born in Düsseldorf, Jungblut first attended the Kunstgewerbeschule Düsseldorf and later became a master student at the Kunstakademie Düsseldorf. To broaden his knowledge, he spent some time in Paris and made several trips to France, Italy and the Netherlands. Jungblut was a member of the Malkasten Artist association, of which he was a member of the board for a long time.

In the early 1930s Jungblut had moved to Düsseldorf-Oberkassel and was given a studio in the Neue Akademie in Stockum. In the 1940s Jungblut's studio was located in the house at Schanzenstrasse 115, on the site of the barrel warehouse of the factory for chemical oils and fats Dr. A. Schmitz. The homeless messenger boy and model of the art academy Peter Muckel also lived here among the barrels of the warehouse.

Jungblut had his work carried out in the Bildgießerei in Düsseldorf-Oberkassel. August Bischoff in Düsseldorf-Oberkassel. In this bronze and iron foundry, bronze statues from the surrounding area were melted down for armament purposes during the Second World War.

== Family ==
Jungblut was a son of the landscape painter Johann Jungblut (1860-1912), who came to Düsseldorf from Saarburg near Trier in 1885. His brothers Walter (1892-1941) and Hans were also painters. Walter Jungblut's wife was also a Düsseldorf painter. She was born Johanette Blum in Benrath in 1909 and died in Düsseldorf in 2003 at the age of 66.

== Work ==
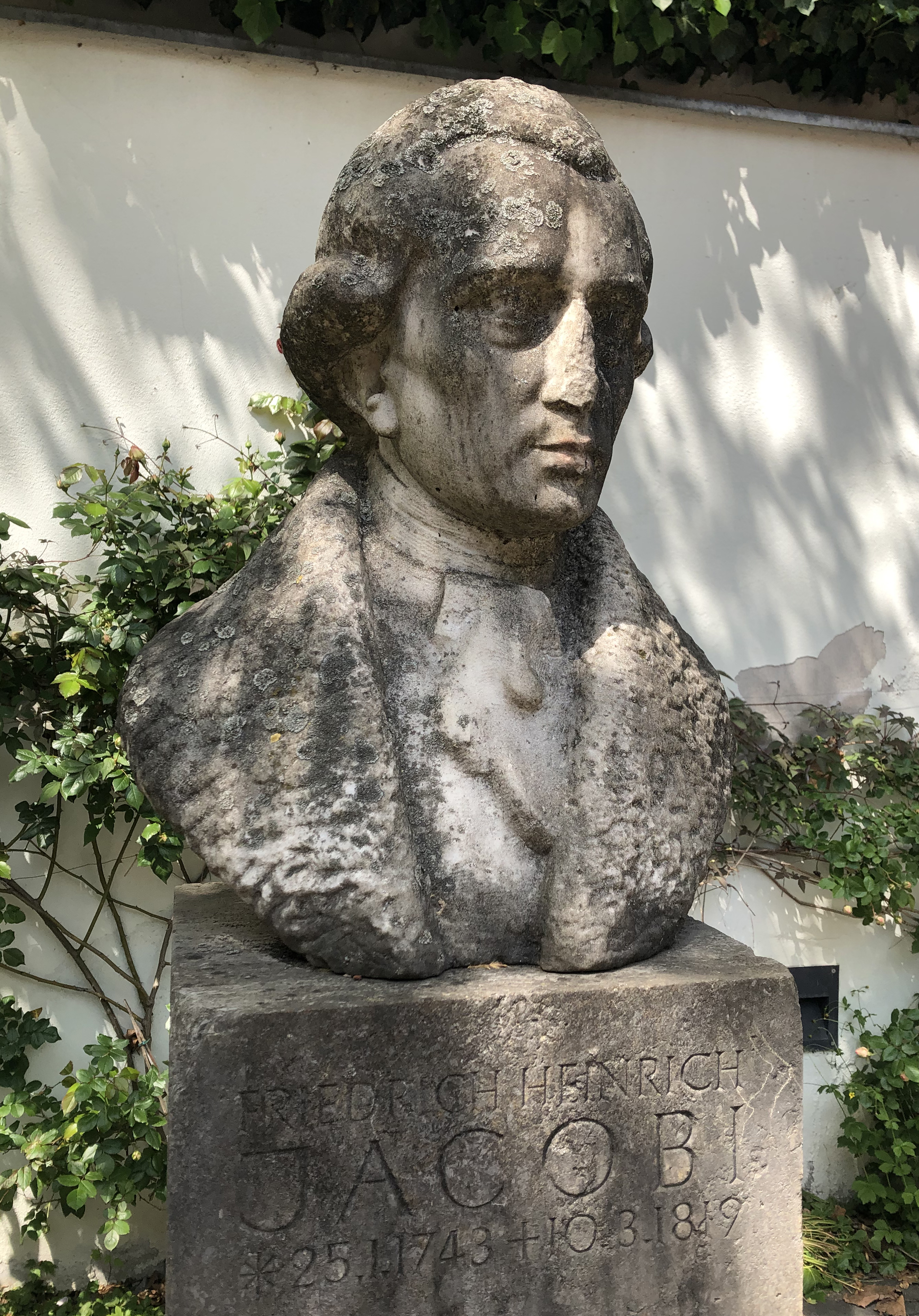
Büste Friedrich Heinrich Jacobi am Eingang zum Malkastenpark (2021)

Thematically, Jungblut devoted most of his work to portraits. However, he also created a number of animal sculptures and free figures. In 1913 and 1920, he participated in exhibitions with masks, portrait figures and sculptures of dancers and received critical acclaim. Numerous small sculptures such as Salome, Colombine, Harlequin and portraits by Jungblut, for example the bust of Reich President Paul von Hindenburg, are now privately owned. Around 1933, Jungblut made a bronze bust of Albert Leo Schlageter and in 1939 a bust of Ernst Eduard vom Rath, which is now presented in the Stadtmuseum Landeshauptstadt Düsseldorf. The 1943 marble bust of Friedrich Heinrich Jacobi now stands in the entrance to the Malkastenpark.

== Exhibitions ==
- 1913: Große Kunstausstellung Düsseldorf
- 1939: Große Deutsche Kunstausstellung, Munich.
- 1941: Große Deutsche Kunstausstellung, Munich.
- 1956: Kunstverein für die Rheinlande und Westfalen in the Alte Kunsthalle at Grabbeplatz

== Works in the open ==
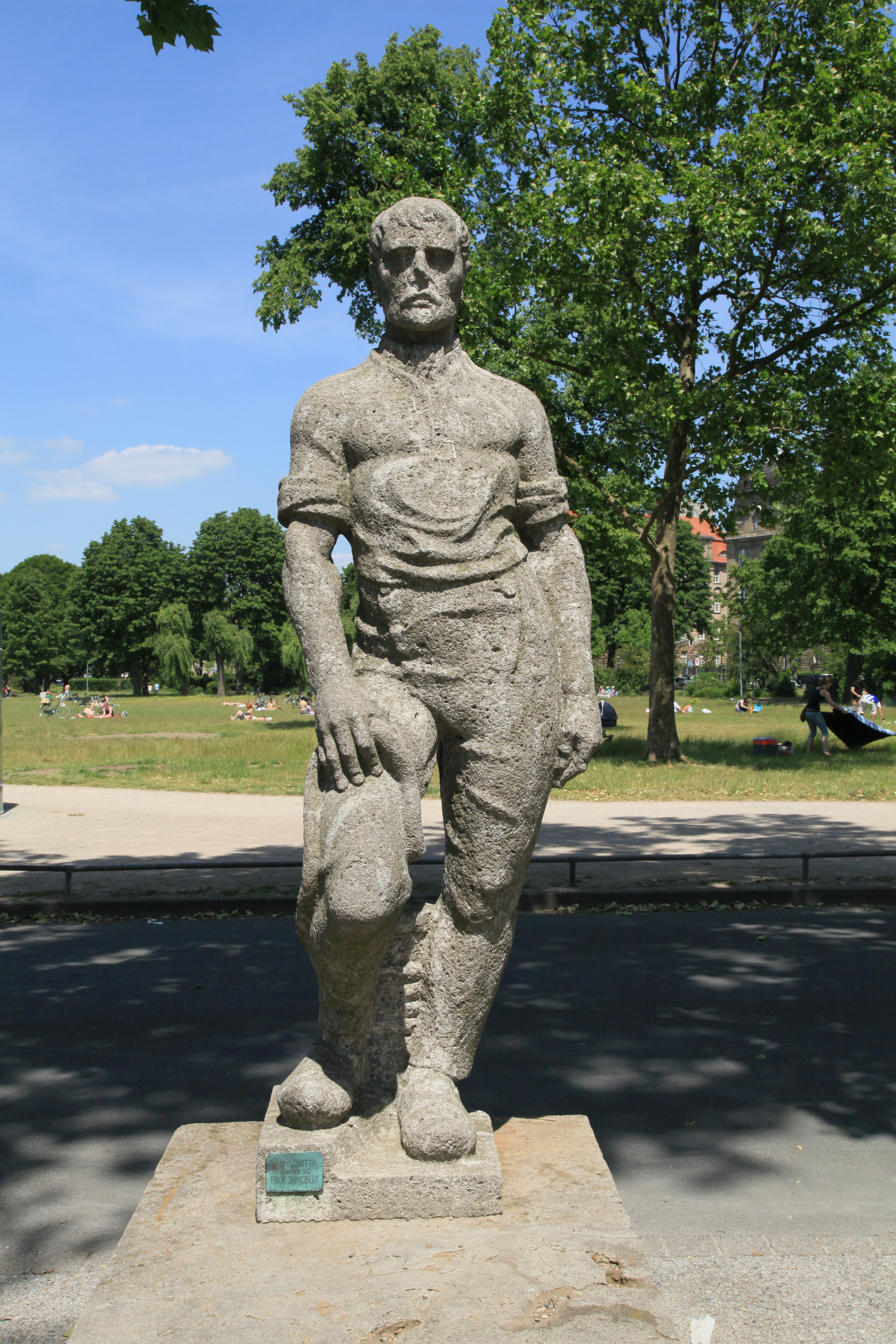
Rheinschiffer am Biergarten der Rheinterrasse with Rheinpark Golzheim im Hintergrund (2015)

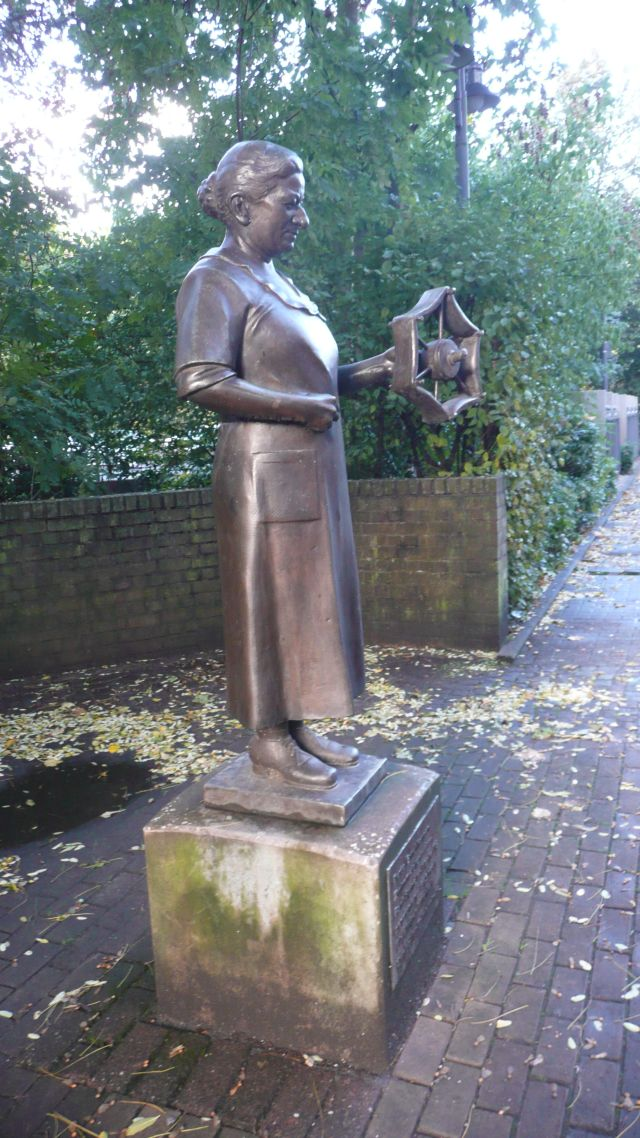
Zwirnmeisterin in Hilden (2013)

- Heinrich-Heine-Büste (1909), Marmor, Bolkerstraße, Düsseldorf
- Hartwarder Friese (1914), Rodenkirchen, Friesendenkmal zum Andenken an die Schlacht an der Hartwarder Landwehr von 1514
- Ehrendenkmal für gefallene deutsche Soldaten (1918), Thiaucourt, France
- Kiepenkerl (ca. 1920), auf dem Dach des ehemaligen Pavillons am Worringer Platz, Düsseldorf
- Muschelkalkportale mit Kinderfiguren (ca. 1926), Lutherkirche, Kopernikusstraße 9, Düsseldorf-Bilk
- Rheinschiffer um 1850 (ca. 1930), Muschelkalk auf Kalksteinplatte, am Robert-Lehr-Ufer nördlich der Rheinterrasse am Biergarten sowie am Rheinpark Golzheim, Düsseldorf.
- Friedrich Karl Henkel-Denkmal (1938) on the Henkel Factory site, Düsseldorf-Holthausen
- Eisenbahn-Gedenktafel (1938) in north tunnel of the Düsseldorf Hauptbahnhof on the 100th anniversary of the first railway line in Germany
- Zwirnmeisterin (1939) for the Kampf & Spindler company, Hilden
- Willi-Weidenhaupt-Büste (1940), Düsseldorfer Jonges Haus, Mertensgasse 1, Düsseldorf
