= Henri Boncquet =

Belgian sculptor (1868–1908)

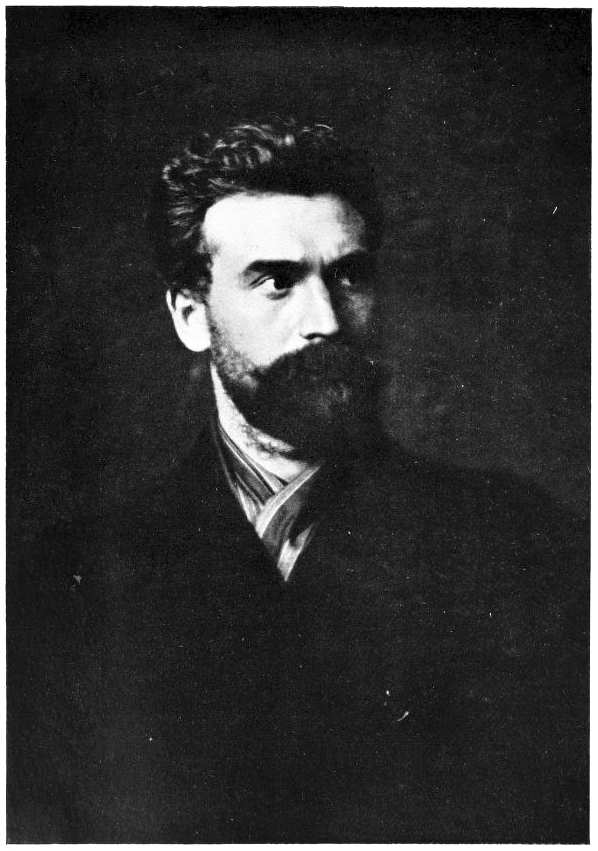
- Born: 7 April 1868; Ardooie, Flemish Community, Belgium
- Died: 10 April 1908 (aged 40); Ixelles, Belgium
- Education: Royal Academy of Fine Arts, Brussels
- Occupation: Sculptor

Henri Boncquet (7 April 1868 – 10 April 1908) was a Belgian sculptor.

== Life ==
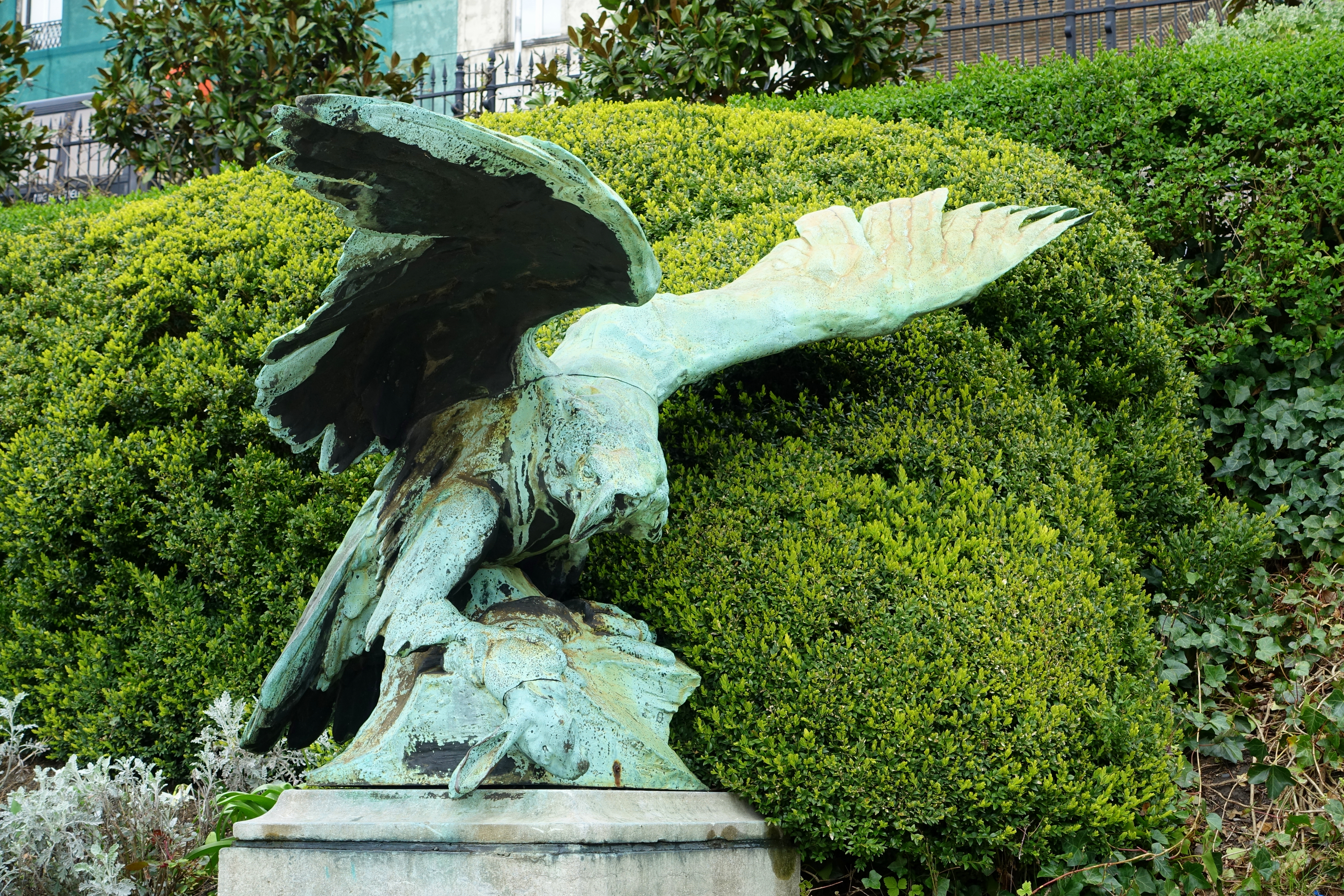
Eagle in the Botanical Garden, Brüssel (2016)

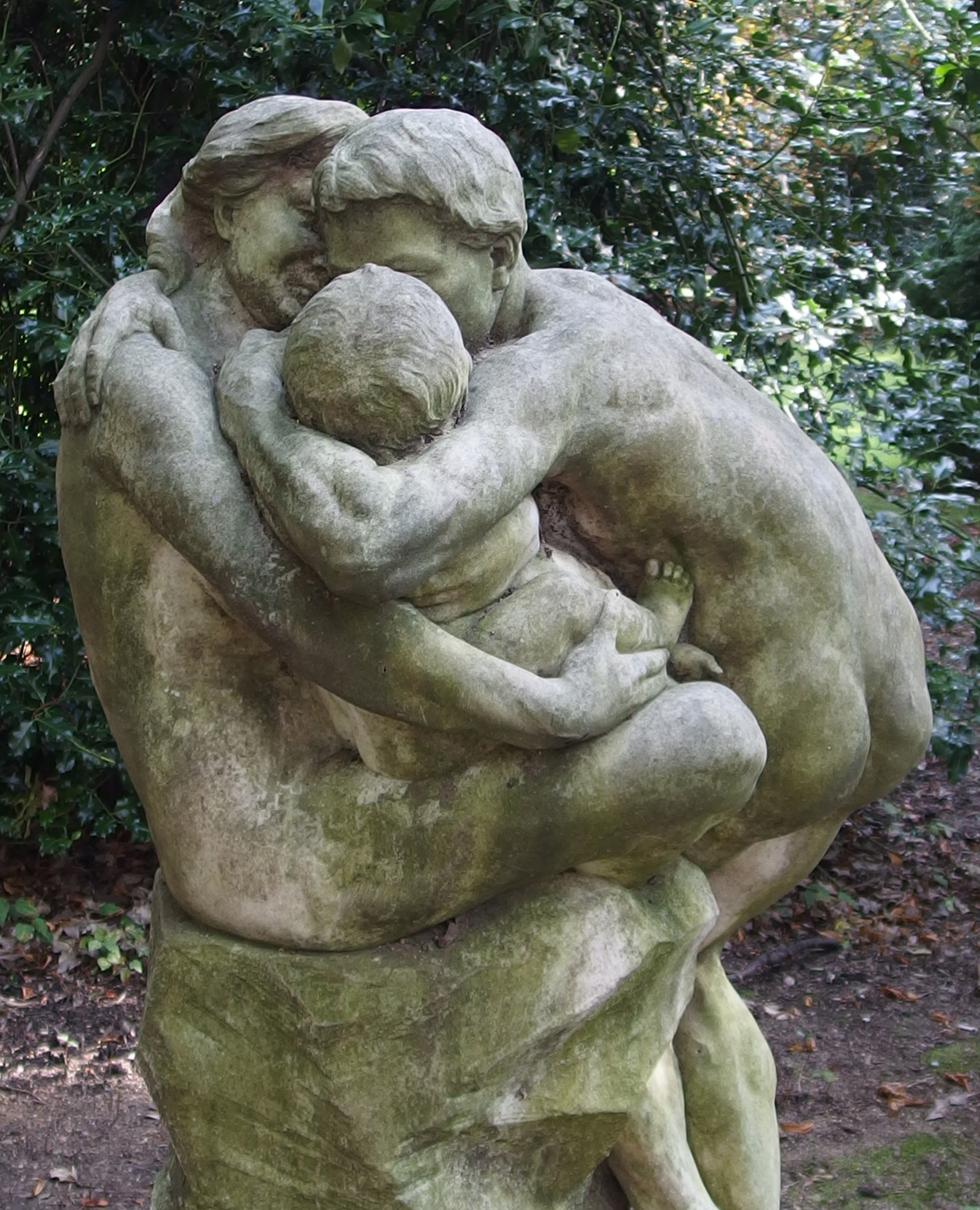
Family with children in Malkastenpark, Düsseldorf (2015)

Henri Boncquet was born in Ardooie into a large family and was orphaned at the age of seven.

In the immediate vicinity of his birthplace, he began his training in Roeselare in the studio of the sculptor Karel Dupon (1853-1907). The latter was the elder brother of the later sculptor and medallist Josuë Dupon (1864-1935). Subsequently, from 1880 to 1881, Boncquet was enrolled at the local Academy of Arts, the SASK, then moved to the Académie Royale des Beaux-Arts in Brussels for a few years. He received his first official commission in 1894: the bronze eagle in the botanical garden at the Schaarbeek Gate in Brussels.

In February 1897, Boncquet applied for the Belgian Prix de Rome at the Artesis Hogeschool Antwerpen, won first prize and went to Rome in 1898. From there, further study trips with a stay in Nuremberg in 1899. Back from Rome, he moved Brussels to the district of Ixelles. In Brussels, he worked figuratively on the town hall of Saint-Gilles on the triumphal arch in the Parc du Cinquantenaire and on three statues in the parks of Ixelles as well as on paintings in the botanical garden. In 1903, his stone sculpture Family with Children was placed in the Malkastenpark in Düsseldorf.

Boncquet died in Ixelles of stomach cancer at the age of 40.

== Works ==
- L’Aigle, Saint-Josse-ten-Noode, Le Botanique (1894)
- Solitaire, Royal Museums of Fine Arts of Belgium (1894)
- Indolence, Royal Museums of Fine Arts of Belgium (1900)
- Le Destin/Het Lot, Ixelles/Elsene, Square Léon Jacquet/Leon Jacquetsquare (1901)
- Familie mit Kind, Malkastenpark, Düsseldorf (positioned in 1903)
- Sollicitude Maternelle, Brüssel, Square de Meeûs (1903)
- L’Industrie, Hôtel de Ville de Saint-Gilles (1905)
- L’Industrie, Royal Museums of Fine Arts of Belgium (1909)
