= Malkastenpark =

German park

Coordinates: 51°13′46.6″N 6°47′20.8″E

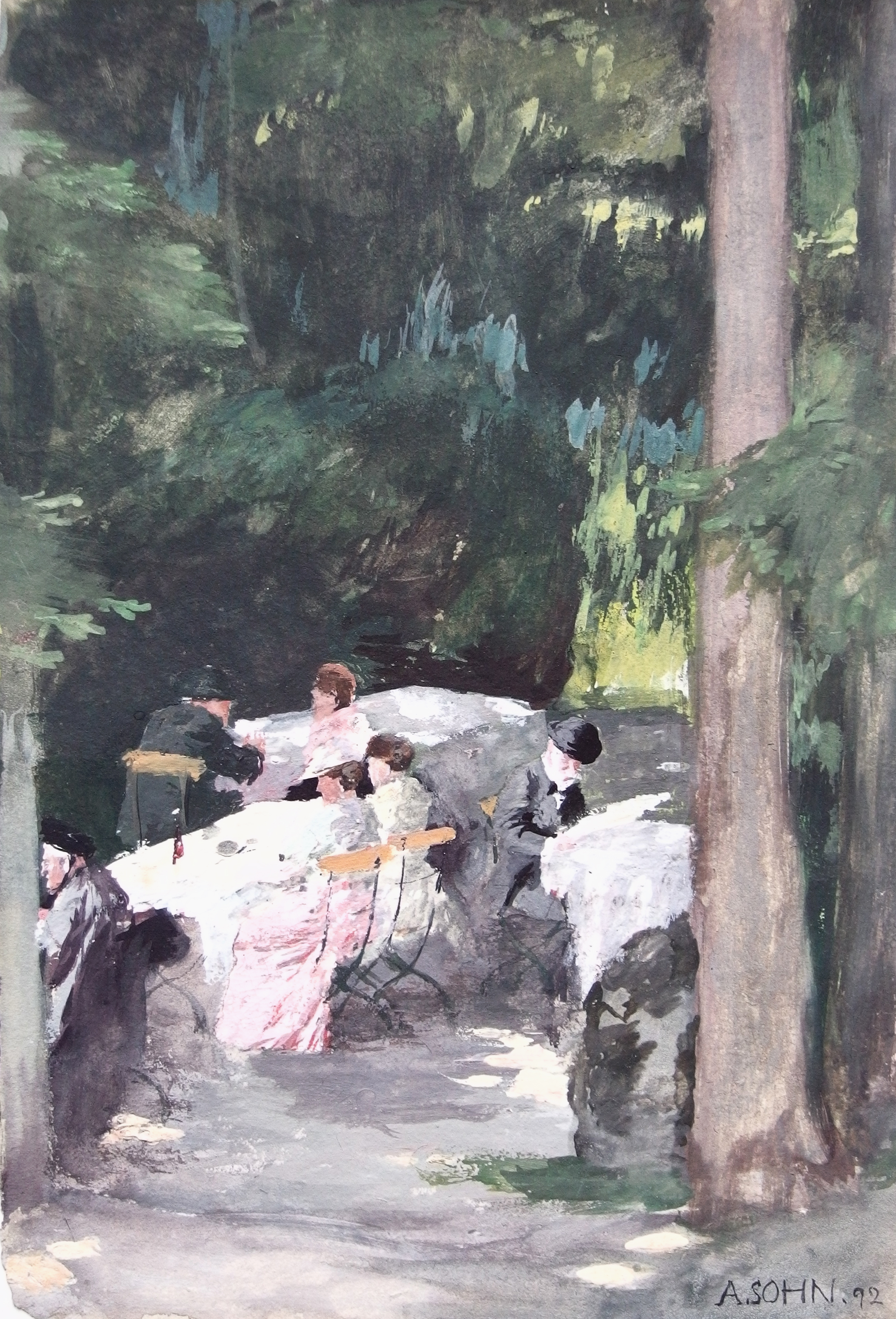
Jacobigarten im Sommer 1892, by Alfred Sohn-Rethel

The Malkastenpark (Paintbox park) is a historic private park, now in the centre of Düsseldorf, North Rhine-Westphalia, Germany. The name refers to a group of artists, Malkasten, founded in 1848. The park is also known as the Jacobigarten, after the original owners who created a Baroque garden. It is now a public garden with both Baroque features and English landscape garden elements, and a listed historic monument.

== Location ==
The park is located next to the Hofgarten, between Malkastenstraße, Jacobistraße, Pempelforter Straße and Louise-Dumont-Straße. It is just under three hectares in size, and runs along the northern Düssel stream.

== History ==
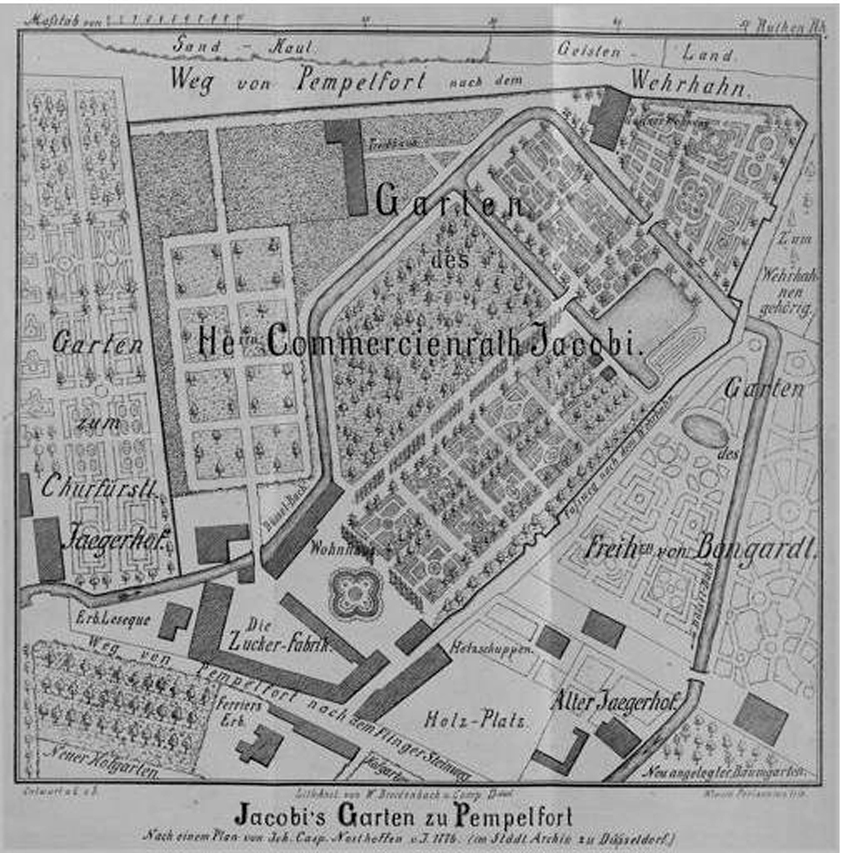
Jacobi’s Garten zu Pempelfort, 1776

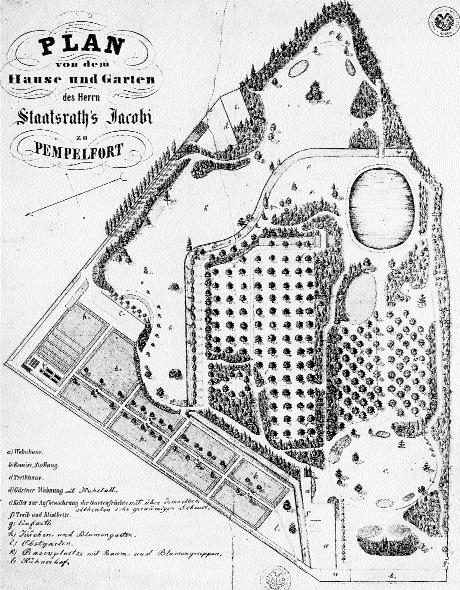
Jacobi’s Garten und seine Baulichkeiten, 1840

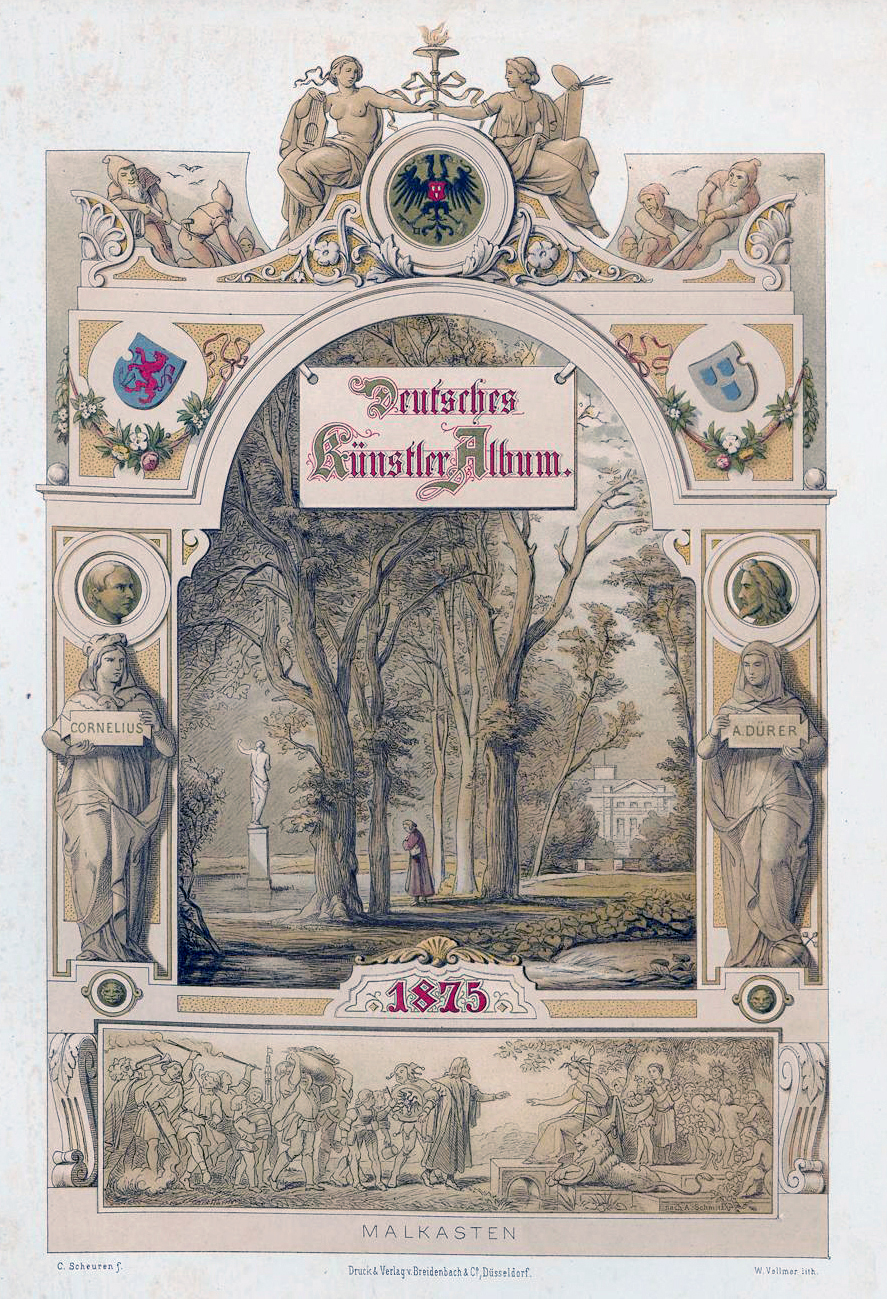
Malkasten, Titelblatt des Deutschen Künstler-Albums by Caspar Scheuren, 1875

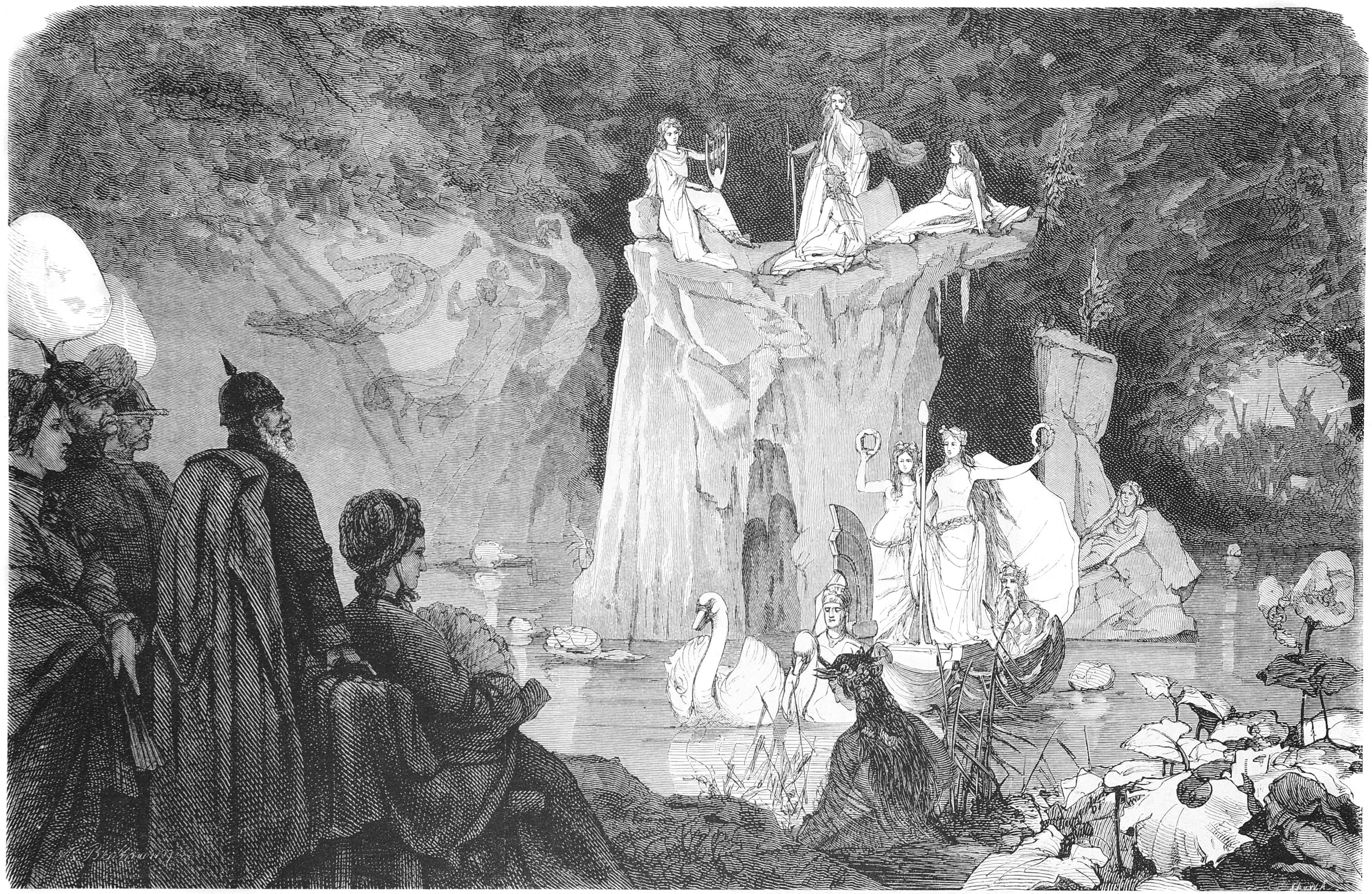
Der Nixenteich auf dem Malkastenfeste zu Düsseldorf, Illustration by Wilhelm Beckmann in der Zeitschrift Die Gartenlaube, 1877

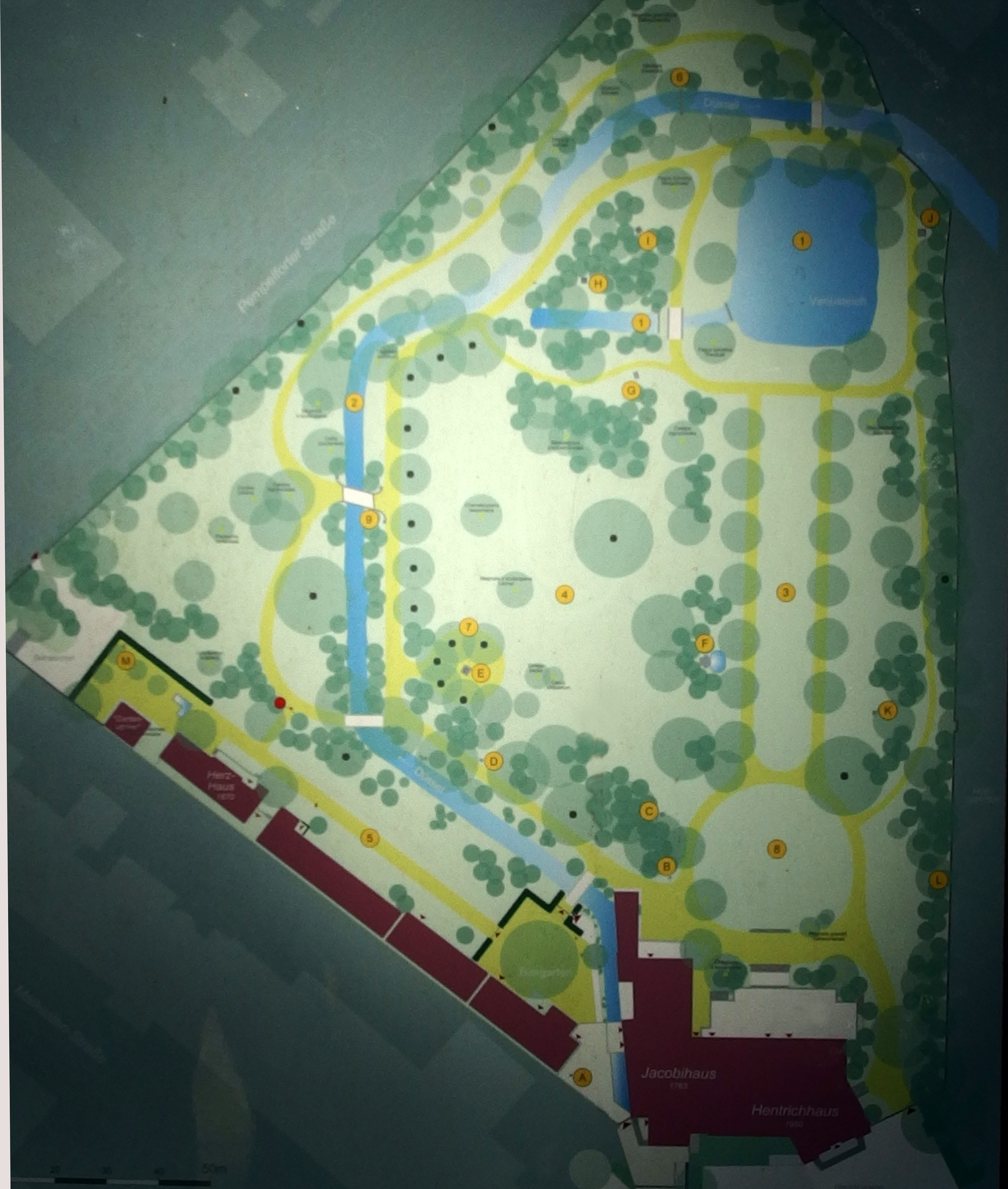
Parkanlage Künstlerverein Malkasten

In the 18th century, several country houses surrounded by gardens were near Schloss Jägerhof called Pempelfort. Johann Konrad Jacobi, a merchant and councilor of commerce, acquired a small estate there in 1742 which became a meeting place for artists and philosophers. It was enhanced by a French formal garden with parterre and avenue. In the 1770s, his son Friedrich Heinrich Jacobi transformed the Baroque garden into an English landscape garden, preserving the central avenue and a pond. The new areas featured orchards with winding paths that crossed the Düssel several times, and a pond. It included various buildings used for horticultural and agricultural purposes. The Jacobi Garden was an early example of an English landscape garden in the Düsseldorf area. For many years, Jacobi and his wife Betty née von Clermont maintained a meeting place for people interested in literature and politics, receiving, among others, Johann Wolfgang von Goethe and Wilhelm von Humboldt in their garden.

Since 1855, the Jacobi house and garden were owned by Friedrich Wilhelm Julius Brewer, the general director of the Düsseldorf gasworks. Brewer wanted to sell the property as a building site to expand housing in Düsseldorf. The mayor of Düsseldorf, Ludwig Hammers, called on Düsseldorf artists to make an effort to purchase and save "the memorable site of German classical literature". The Malkasten association of artists, founded in 1848, tried to acquire the estate, in order to save the Jacobi garden. The Düsseldorf notary Joseph Euler, a founding member of the Malkasten, and the district president Leo von Massenbach supported the efforts by bringing about the "Corporationsrecht" (right of incorporation) for the Malkasten, which finally opened the legal way for the artists' association to acquire the property. On 17 September 1857, the landscape painter Andreas Achenbach and the industrial lobbyist Alexander von Sybel bought or pre-financed the Jacobi'schen Garten "with residential buildings, sheds, stables, barn, sheds, park with orangery house, meadow, vegetable garden and orchard, a total of 11 acres 117 Ruthen for 22,000 Thaler" with the intention of later transferring it to the Malkasten. The purchase was ultimately financed by a worldwide lottery of paintings, to which artists of the Düsseldorf school of painting contributed.

The redesign of a new English landscape garden was the responsibility of the Royal garden director Joseph Clemens Weyhe. The Malkasten ceremoniously moved into the garden on 14 July 1860. The gardens with the Düsselbach stream, the Venusteich pond (also known as the "Nixenteich") and historic and new buildings, provided space and a backdrop for imaginative artists' festivals that were famous beyond the borders of Düsseldorf. The Kaiserfest (Emperor's feast) was held in 1877 in honour of Emperor Wilhelms I and Empress Augusta, beginning a tradition of legendary festival productions in the Malkastenpark.

After the Second World War, the destroyed part of the Malkasten-Haus and its terrace needed rebuilding. In the process, Roland Weber, one of the most important landscape architects of the 20th century, redesigned the garden.

In the summer of 1997, the artists Jost Wischnewski, Gregor Russ, and curator Karl Heinz Rummeny founded the Parkhaus, a building in the area of the utility garden and former garden houses, serving as an experimental exhibition space intended primarily intended for young international artists.

The park has been a listed monument since 2001. In 2014, it was severely damaged by Storm Ela, which felled 40 trees and affected 200 others, damaged walls, threw sculptures from their pedestals and displaced stones. Repair, especially to recreate the background of tulip trees and magnolia trees behind the pond, was supported by sponsors and the city's departments for gardens, culture, historic monuments, and the treasury. The park was extensively restored over three years, after plans by landscape architect Achim Röthig. It was reopened to the public in September 2015.

== Description ==
The park includes the northern Düssel stream, with a small waterfall in place from 1840. A pond, Venus Pond, with rounded corners is still in forms of the Baroque period, with a sculpture of Venus in its centre, modelled after the Venus of Capua, an earlier version of the Venus de Milo. When the fountain was installed in the pond, a historic water pipe was found, which is now being reused.

The entrance area to the Malkastenpark is on the left hand side next to the Jacobihaus. With an entrance fee of two euros, which the Künstlerverein Malkasten uses for the maintenance of the park, visitors contribute to the park's nature and art.

On the nationwide Tag des offenen Denkmals in September, the park is usually open to the public for free.

== Works of art ==
The park features several works of art, including:

- Friedrich Heinrich Jacobi, Bust of the sculptor Emil Jungblut, erected in 1943 in the entrance area of the Malkasten-Haus to the Malkastenpark.
- Andreas Achenbach, bust in stone by Clemens Buscher, 1905.
- Mother with Child, sculpture by Franz Dorrenbach (1870–1943), before 1913.
- Memorial to members and friends of the Malkasten, stone monument created by the sculptor Carl Geiling (1874–1924) and erected on 24 July 1921 at the Lindenrondell.
- Düsselnixe, limestone sculpture by Gustav Rutz, created 1895–1896, since 1897 in the park
- Family with Child, stone sculpture by Henri Boncquet (1868–1908), since 1903 in the park
- Sitting Youth, shell limestone sculpture by Richard Langer, in the park since 1925
- Goethe bust on stele, by Gustav Rutz in 1899
- Mother Ey by Gerda Kratz, c. 1983/85
- Laozi, bronze sculpture by Yungang Chen (born 1956), a gift from the China National Academy of Painting in Beijing, installed in the park in June 2015
- Column, from the classicist portico of the Alte Tonhalle, as a reminder of the traditional place of Düsseldorf music, erected in 1951
- Music-making children, by an unknown artist
- Lion's Head, fragment of one of the lions of the baroque coat of arms of Jägerhof Palace, placed on a pedestal. Location: end point of the kitchen garden.
- Gate of Faces, by Horst Gläsker, installation at the park gate, inaugurated in November 2009
- Cast of a relief panel of the singer's pulpit by Luca della Robbia from the cathedral in Florence, in the area of the former garden houses
