= Gerda Kratz =

German sculptor

Gerda Kratz (6 July 1926 – 13 March 2011) was a German sculptor.

== Life ==
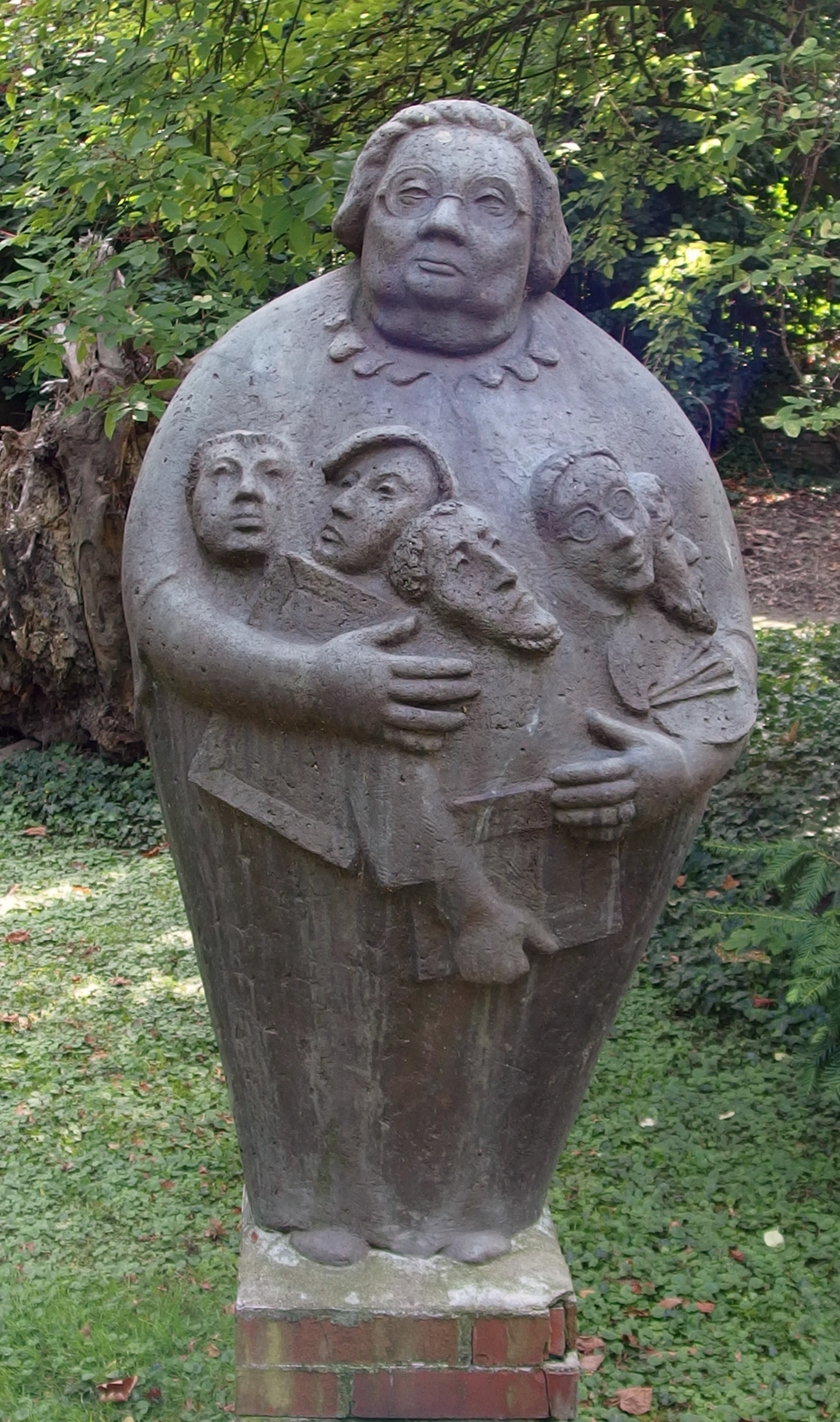
Mutter Ey, in Malkastenpark, Düsseldorf

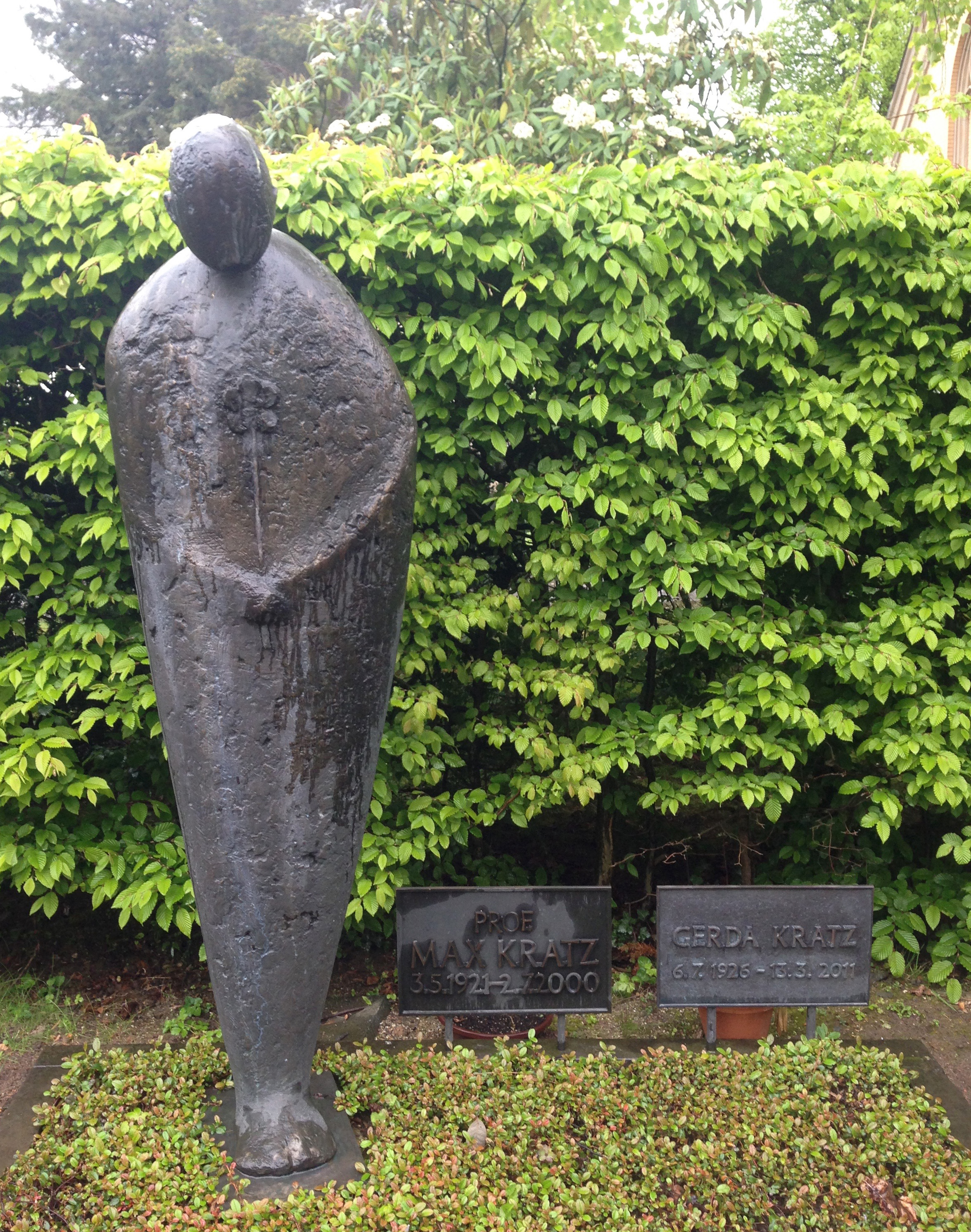
Grave sites of Gerda and Max at Kratz Nordfriedhof Düsseldorf

Born in Pirmasens as the daughter of the shoe manufacturer Gustav Rheinberger, Gerda Rheinberger studied at the Meisterschule für das gestaltende Handwerk in Düsseldorf from 1946 to 1947 and was a private student of the sculptor Willi Hoselmann. From 1948 to 1949, she attended the sculpture class of Adolf Wamper at the Essen Folkwang University of the Arts and from 1950 to 1952, Gerda studied at the Kunstakademie Düsseldorf with Bruno Goller and Joseph Enseling. In 1951, she married the sculptor Max Kratz, and in 1953 their son Thomas was born. The couple had a long-standing working relationship in their studio in Grafenberg and several of her husband's assistants worked alongside her at this time, with hard work during the day and happy parties at night. Small-format bronzes and terracottas were created during this period. There were also numerous journeys around the world. Since 1980, Kratz had her own studio in Gerresheim. She participated in exhibitions and competitions. Museum acquisitions and commissions for works in public spaces followed. Gerda Kratz had been a member of the Düsseldorf Women Artists' Association and the Künstlerverein Malkasten since 1984. When her husband died in 2000, she set up a foundation to care for his work and gave this foundation to Solingen, where her husband carried out several commissions and chaired the art advisory board for many years. On 13 March 2011, Kratz died in Düsseldorf at the age of 84. Kratz was buried at her husband's side in the Nordfriedhof in Düsseldorf.

== Work ==
Kratz war eine Gerresheimer Künstlerin, die hohes handwerkliches Können mit Ideen und Humor verbinden konnte. Ihre Arbeiten, beispielsweise Im Eimer, Im Café, Lovers and Big Egg Band, sind geprägt durch runde und knubbelige Figuren. Sie arbeitete in Stein, Bronze, Keramik, Holz und auch Kunststoff (Leguval).

== Works ==
- 1983: Mutter Ey, Polyester for bronze, h. 50 cm
- 1985: Ende der Freiheit, h. 49 cm
- 1989: Endstation, Leguval, h. 145 cm.
- 1996: Black Pieta, Leguval, h. 48 cm
- 1997: Auf dem Korb, bronze, h. 25 cm
- Das Fenster, bronze, 33 × 36 cm
- Das Instrument, bronze 81 cm
- Heilige Ursula, ceramic, h. 100 cm
- Lesendes Paar, Bronze, Solingen.

== Exhibitions ==
- 1962 until 1989: Wuppertal and Solingen B.K.G.
- from 1984: VDK in Düsseldorf, Stadtmuseum, Kunstpalast, Zollhalle, Kaarst, Mettmann, Welver, Bonn Frauenmuseum
- from 1984: KVM Düsseldorf, Berlin, Moskau, Luzern
- 1986: Angermund
- 1989: Groningen, Castorp, Freinsheim
- 1990: Pirmasens
- 1996, 1999, 2002: Hilden
- 2002: Melanchthon Gemeinde, Düsseldorf-Rath

== Awards ==
Kratz was awarded the Order of Merit of North Rhine-Westphalia on 2 September 1987.
