= Cartwheel (gymnastics) =

Sideways rotary movement of the body

Cartwheel animation

A cartwheel is a sideways rotary movement of the body. It is performed by bringing the hands to the floor one at a time while the body inverts. The legs travel over the body trunk while one or both hands are on the floor, and then the feet return to the floor one at a time, ending with the athlete standing upright. It is called a cartwheel because the performer's arms and legs move in a fashion similar to the spokes of a turning (cart) wheel.

Cartwheels are commonly performed in gymnastics in the floor exercise and on the balance beam. On the floor, a gymnast may precede a cartwheel with other movements, as in a chasse cartwheel, which begins with side-step "gallops". Besides gymnastics, cartwheels are performed in certain dances, cheer, and in the martial art of capoeira. In classical Indian Karana dance, it is called talavilasitam.

== History ==
Cartwheels date back to antiquity and were used for play by the ancient Greeks and Romans. An early documented case of cartwheels occurred in Düsseldorf after the Battle of Worringen in which Adolf VIII, Count of Berg, defeated the Archbishop of Cologne in 1288. As a result of the victory, Düsseldorf received city rights and children celebrated in the streets by doing cartwheels.

== Technique ==
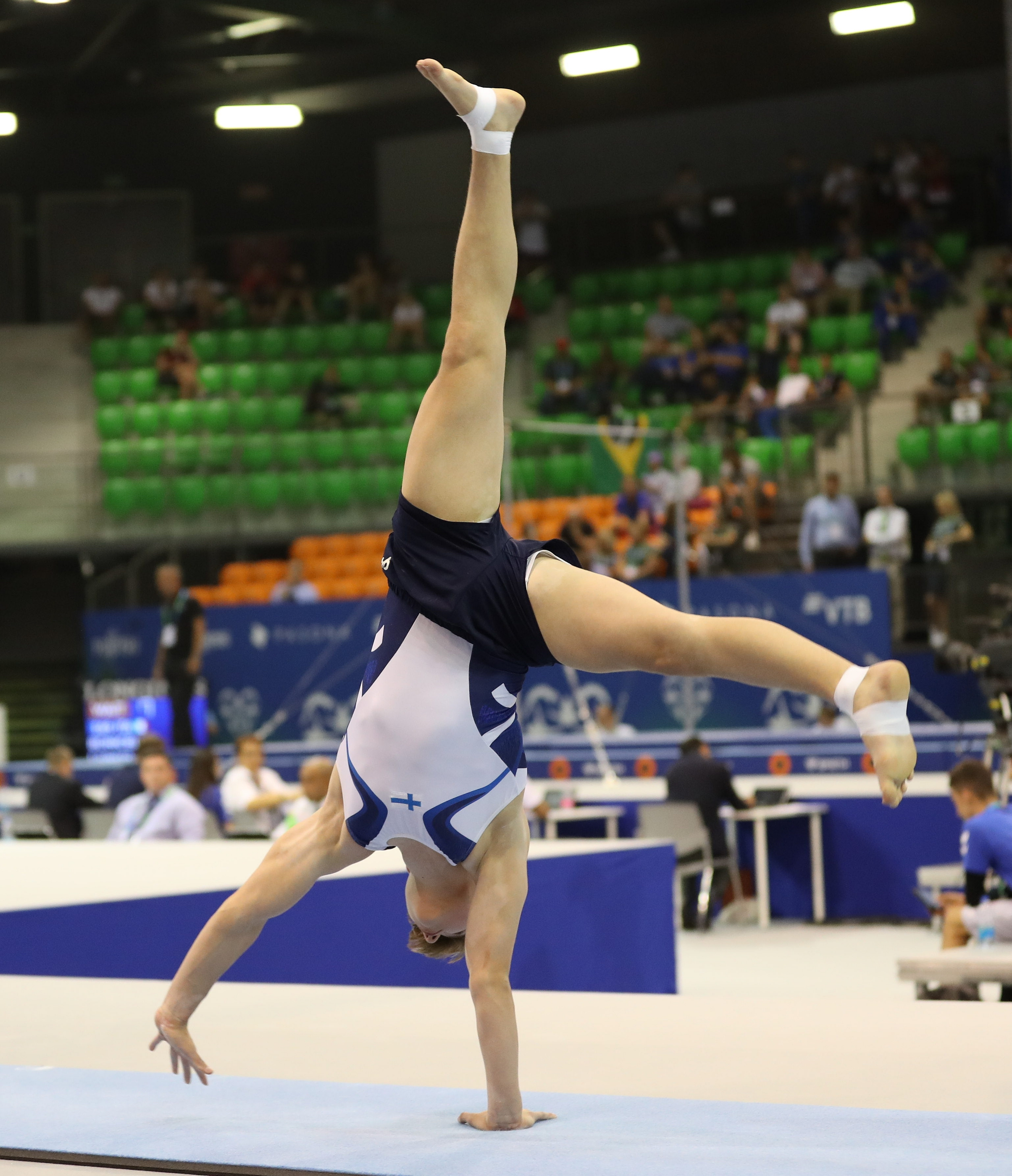
A cartwheel performed by a gymnast at the 2019 Junior World Championships.

To perform a cartwheel, one moves sideways in a straight line, keeping the back straight, butt and core tight and head in; places the hand of the same side on the ground, followed by the other hand; kicks the legs over the body and brings them down as the hands and body come up to a standing position.

A classic cartwheel performed with proper gymnastics form always starts with a forward lunge: the lead leg (stronger leg) in front and the weaker leg in the back. During the lunge, the gymnast has their arms high in the air and straight, with hips square and belly button facing forward. The gymnast then pushes off the front leg and places their hands side by side on the ground in front of them. As they do this, they kick their legs up and over their torso and head as their body becomes inverted. During the rotation, the legs stay apart in a large, wide straddle (as far apart as the gymnast can get them). The legs are straight, and the toes and feet are pointed. In United States competitions, the legs must reach at least 90 degrees of motion in a competition in order for the gymnast to receive the maximum number of points. Finally, the gymnast sets their first foot on the ground, followed by the second foot, landing in a lunge with the weaker leg in front and the lead leg in back. The gymnast lands facing the opposite direction from the one they started in, hands and arms straight and high, then salutes.

A cartwheel with legs bent rather than outstretched when the body is inverted can be a useful interim training technique for gymnastic pupils attempting to learn the full cartwheel, as the smaller body area is easier to control.

== See also ==
- Aerial cartwheel, a hands-free cartwheel
- Aú, a cartwheel in capoeira
- Düsseldorf's cartwheeler
