= Gustav Rutz =

German sculptor

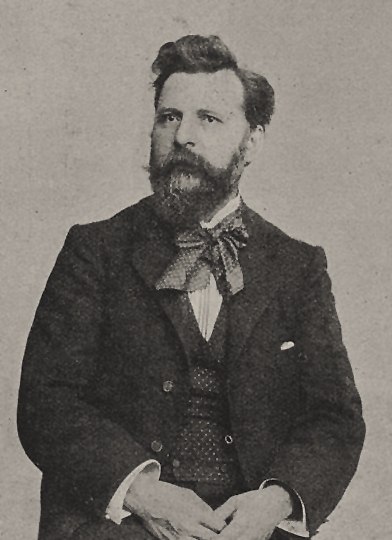
Gustav Rutz, 1904

Karl Gustav Rutz (14 December 1857 – 9 August 1949) was a German sculptor.

== Life and work ==
Born in Cologne, Rutz was first a painting student of Julius Geertz in Düsseldorf. With his fellow students from the Geertz studio, Franz Thöne and August Flinker, Gustav Rutz undertook study trips within Germany. In Munich he then trained in sculpture under Anton Hess. From 1879, Rutz settled in Düsseldorf. His studio was located in 1888 directly opposite the south side of the Kunstakademie in the house Hafenwall 7 (today Eiskellerstraße). He became known for cemetery and monument sculptures as well as numerous fountains in German cities. His sculptures, partly in the neobaroque style, earned nationwide fame at the time. Around 1899 he was a member of the I. Kunstgenossenschaft in Düsseldorf.

Beim Besuch des Kaiserpaares Wilhelm II. und Viktoria Ende Oktober 1900 in (Wuppertal-) Vohwinkel wurde dort der „Siegesbrunnen mit Germania“ feierlich enthüllt. Wilhelm II. lobte Rutz als dessen Schöpfer, und am 27. Januar 1901, an des Kaisers Geburtstag, wurde der Siegesbrunnen ins Eigentum der Stadt Vohwinkel übernommen.

In 1902, Rutz was awarded 1st prize in the competition for a Kaiser-Friedrich statue in Mönchengladbach, and was entrusted with its realisation. The statue was to be placed in the vestibule of the new city hall, the Kaiser-Friedrich-Halle, which was inaugurated in 1903.

Rutz was a member of the Malkasten. The Goethe-Herme made of stone was created by him on the occasion of the Düsseldorf Goethe Festival of 1899 and erected in 1903 in the Malkastenpark, the former "Jacobigarten".

The architect Richard Hultsch built a two-storey villa for Gustav Rutz on the Achenbachstraße 24 plot in Düsseldorf-Düsseltal in 1905–1906.

Rutz died at the age of 91 in the senior citizens' residence of the Riehler Heimstätten.

== Work ==
- Graves in the Nordfriedhof (Düsseldorf): Family Hermes, Jean Louis Piedbœuf, Family Schlote, Family Schütte.
- 1892: Gravesite of the piano maker Family Peter Adolph Rudolph Ibach at the Unterbarmer Friedhof in (Wuppertal-) Barmen.
- 1897: Standbild Kaiser Wilhelms I. in Burgsteinfurt, Markt (Melted down as a metal donation in 1942).
- 1895–1896: Düsselnixe-Brunnen im Malkastenpark in Düsseldorf (Donated to the Artists' Association founded in 1848 for the upcoming 50th anniversary and erected in the park in 1897)
- 1899: Hohenzollernbrunnen in Rheydt, Marktplatz. (The fountain was already quietly dismantled after World War I.)
- 1899: Kaiser-Friedrich-Brunnen in Krefeld-Uerdingen, Marktplatz (1938/1939 demolished during the construction of a deep bunker under the square).
- 1900: Victory Fountain with Germania figure in front of the former district hall in (Wuppertal-) Vohwinkel, Gräfrather Straße (destroyed in World War II).
- 1900: Kaiser Wilhelm I statue in Montabaur (dismantled and melted down in 1944)
- 1903: Monument to Count Arnold III, Count of Bentheim-Steinfurt-Tecklenburg-Limburg in Schloss Burgsteinfurt.
- 1903/1904: Fountain figure "Wasserträgerin" (Water Bearer) in bronze for the grotto by the garden architect Martin Reinhardt (1876–1935) at the Internationalen Kunst-Ausstellung und Großen Gartenbau-Ausstellung 1904 in Düsseldorf.
- 1904: Bronze plaque of the psychiatrist Carl Pelman (made on the occasion of his retirement from the service, later attached to his tomb at the Alter Friedhof Bonn)
- 1905: Ludwig Friedrich Seyffardt monument in Krefeld, Ostwall.
- 1905/1906: Monument for Gottfried Kinkel in (Bonn-) Oberkassel
- 1907: Allegorical figure "The Music" in front of the Stadthalle Wuppertal Elberfeld, on the Johannisberg (destroyed in the Second World War).
- 1907: Gravestone for Christine Becker in Wiesbaden, at the Nordfriedhof.
- 1911: Sculptures on gravesite of the Piekenbrock family in Carrara marble, at the Ostfriedhof Essen.
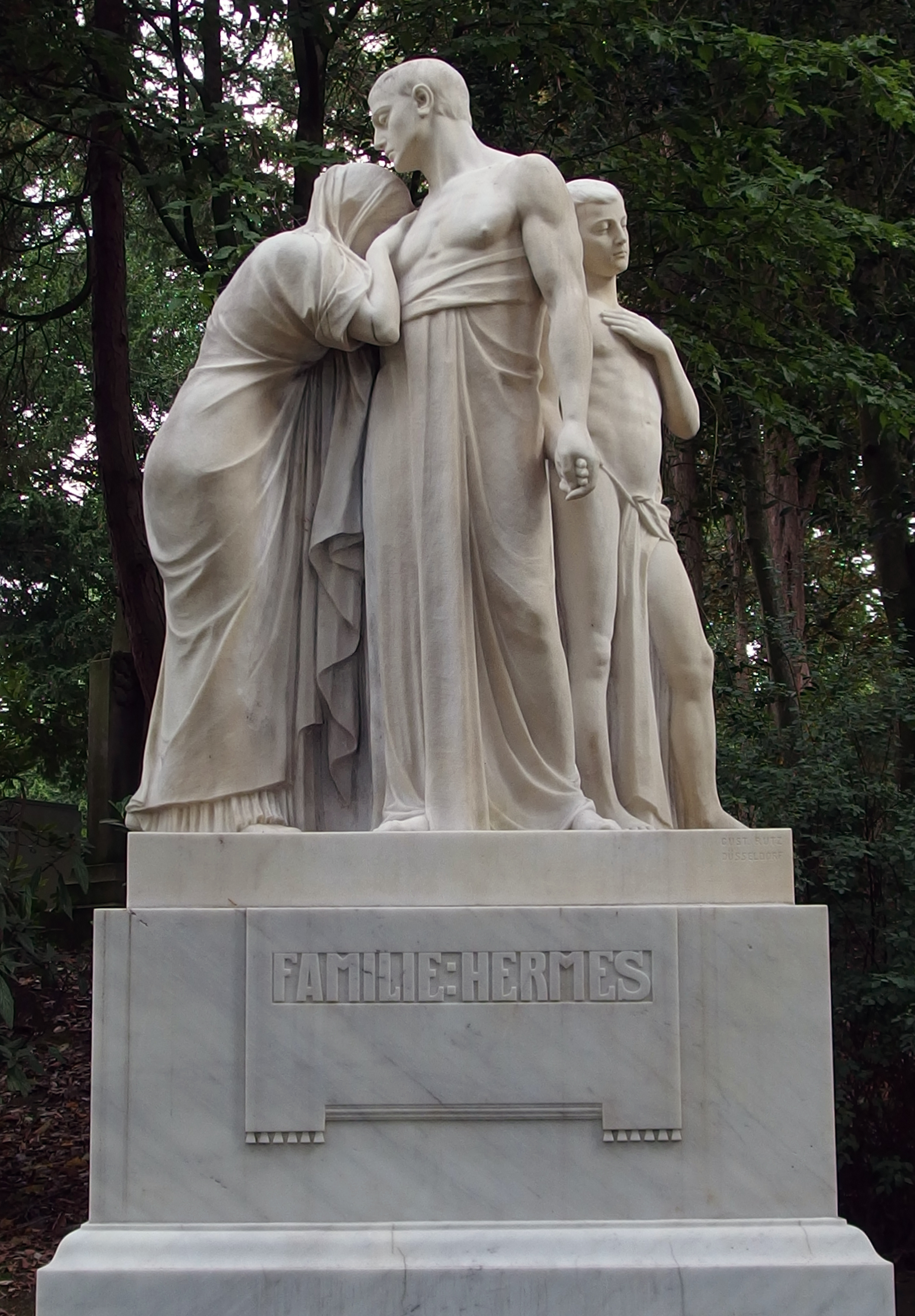
Gravestone of the Hermes family at Düsseldorf North Cemetery

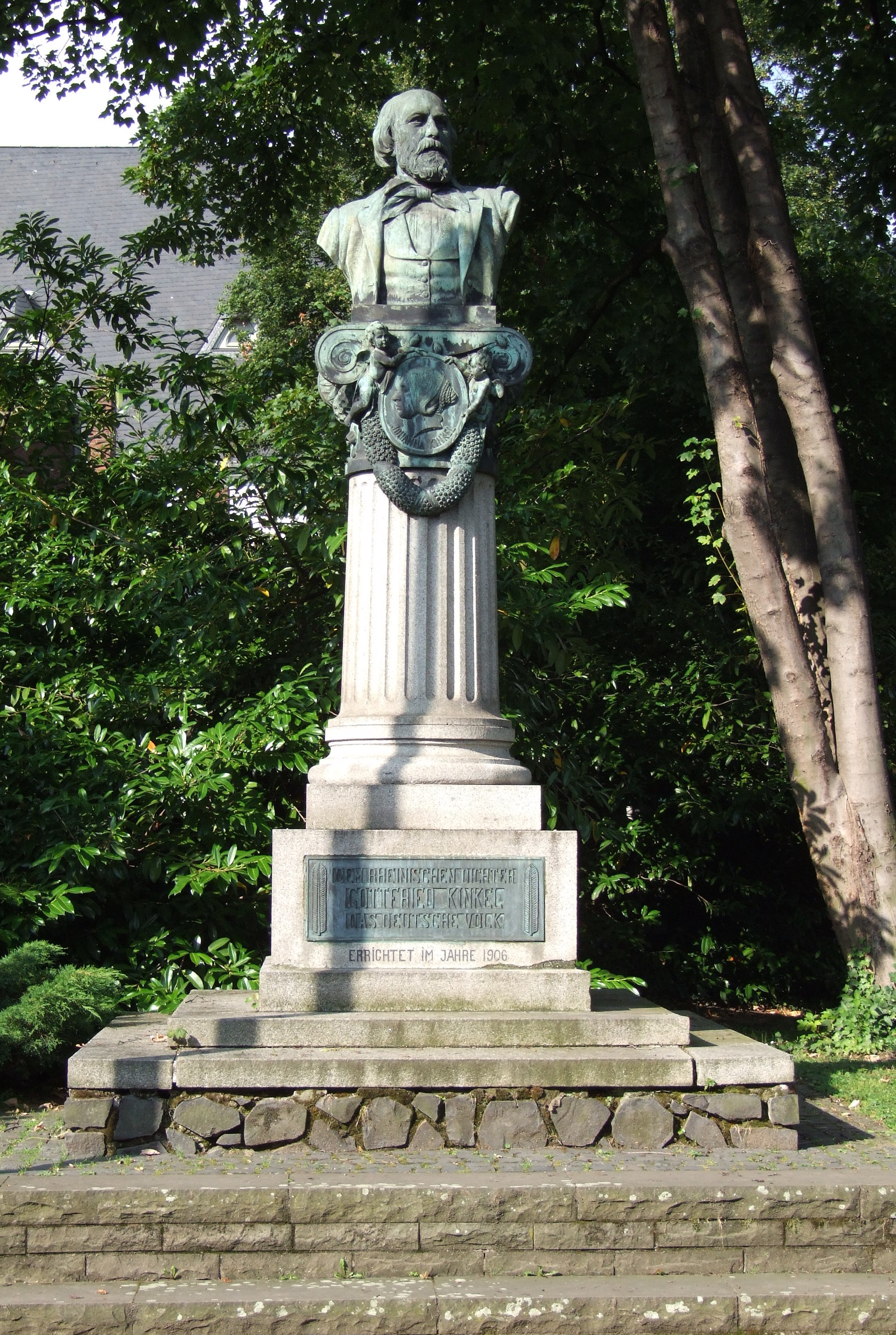
Gottfried Kinkel Monument in Bonn-Oberkassel

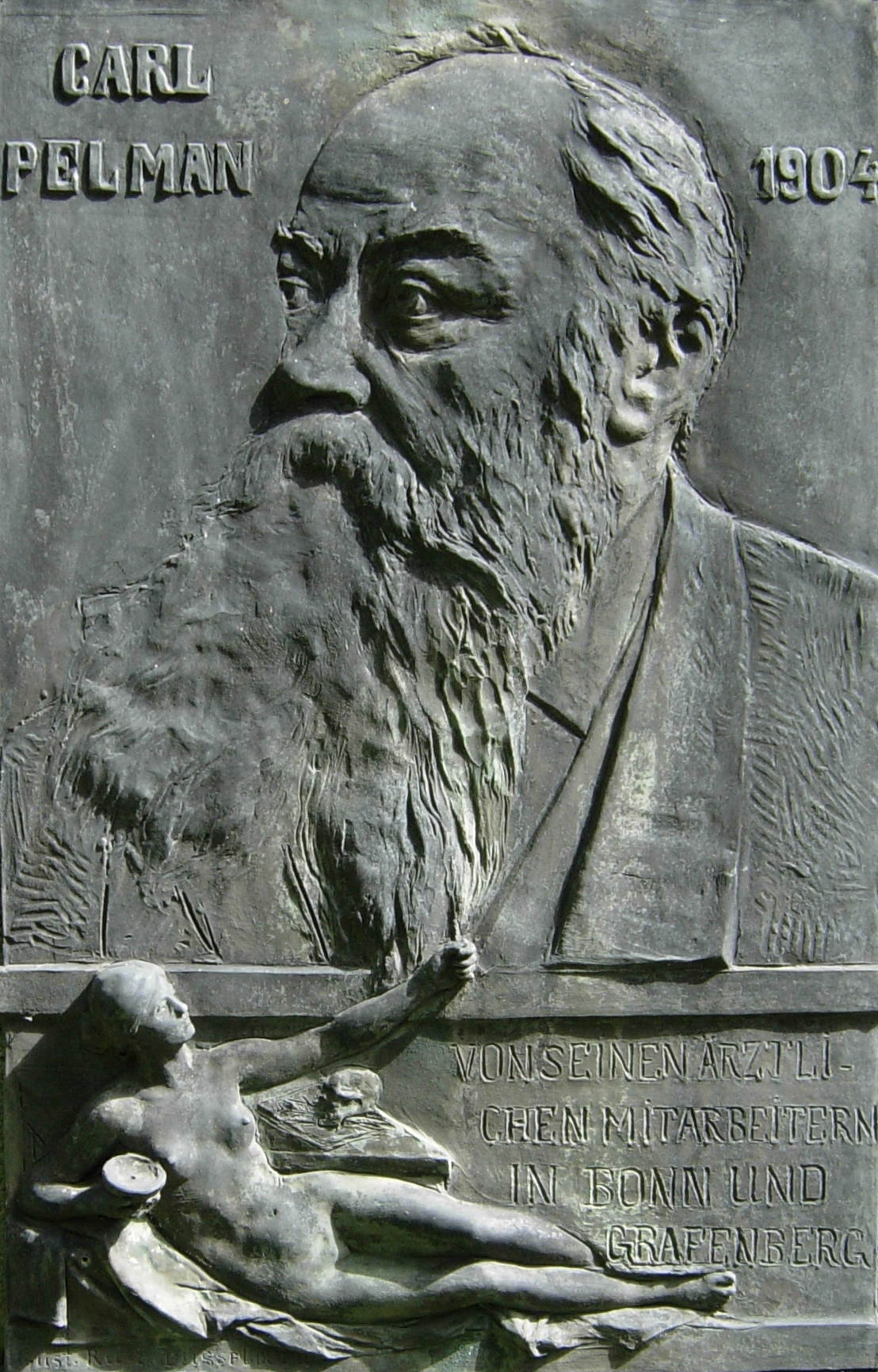
Gravestone for Carl Pelman at the Old Cemetery in Bonn

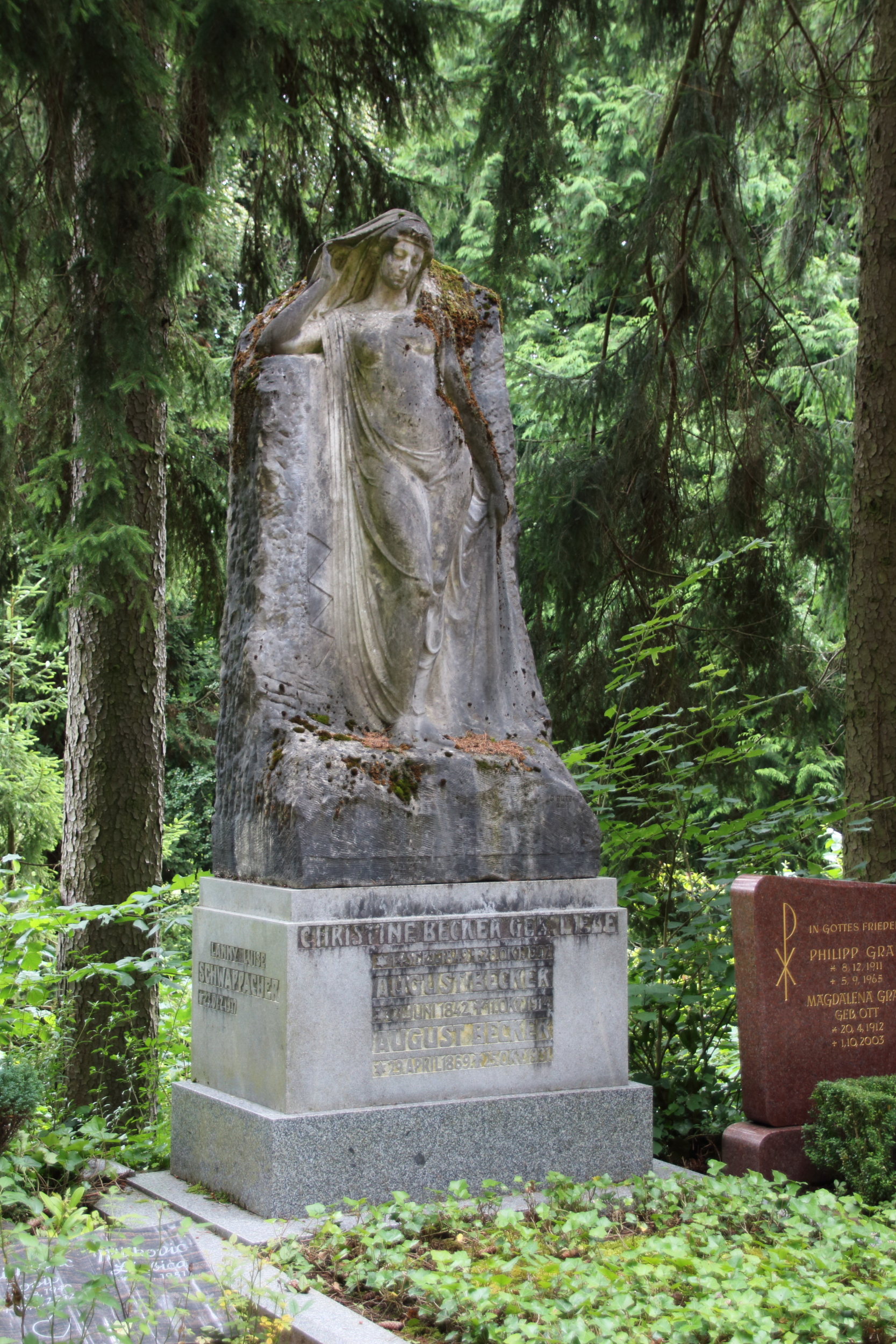
Gravestone for Christine Becker at the North Cemetery in Wiesbaden

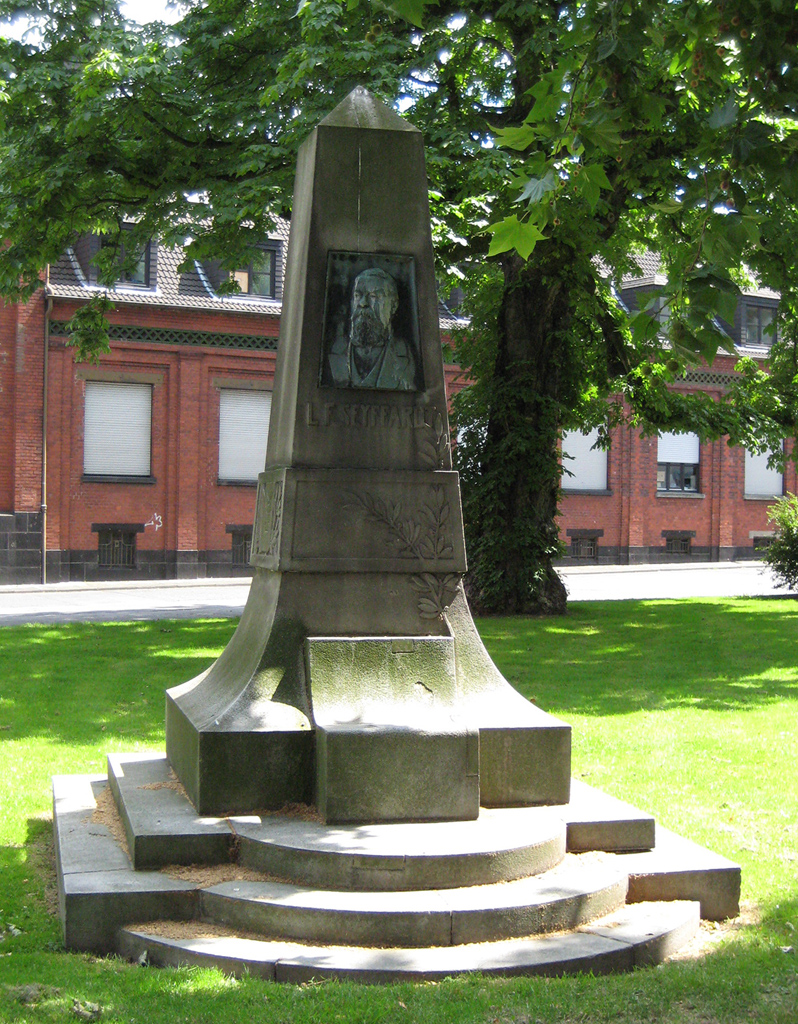
Seyffardt Monument on the Ostwall in Krefeld

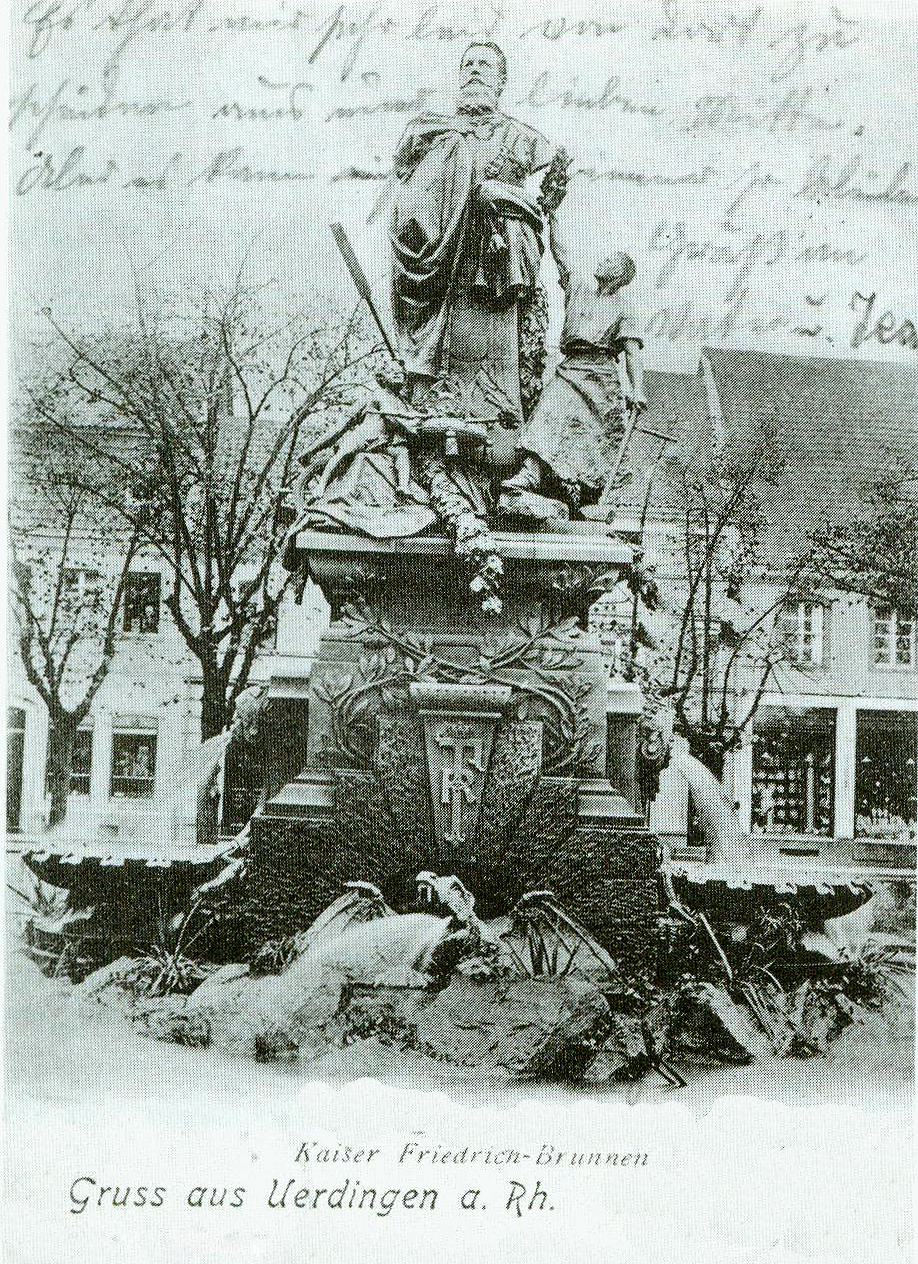
Emperor Friedrich Fountain in (Krefeld-) Uerdingen

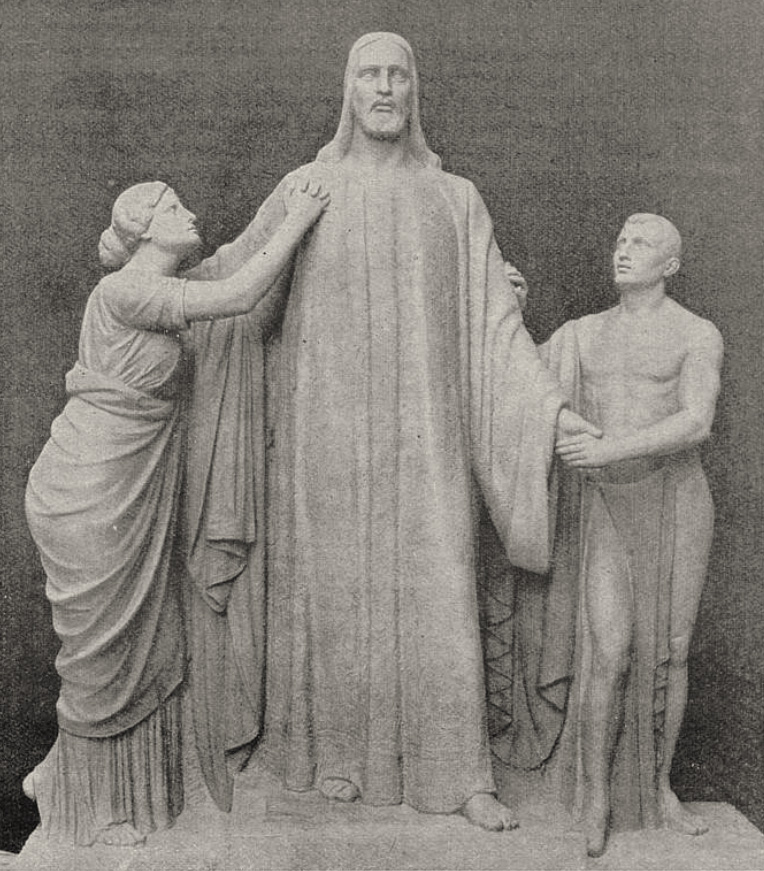
Main piece of the grave monument for the Piekenbrock family in Essen
