= Düsseldorf's cartwheeler =

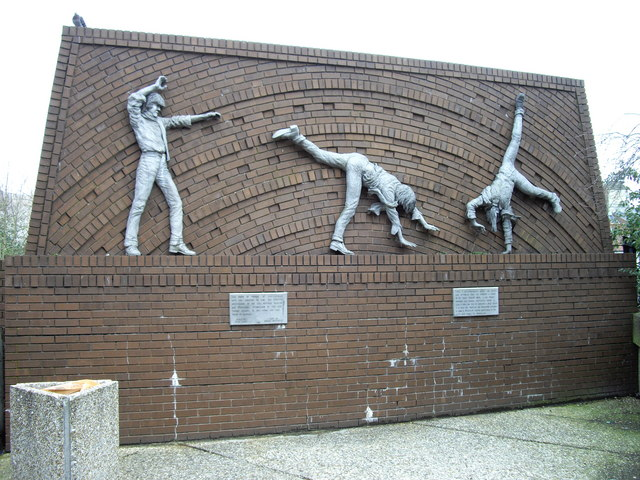
Sculpture of Cartwheeling Boys.

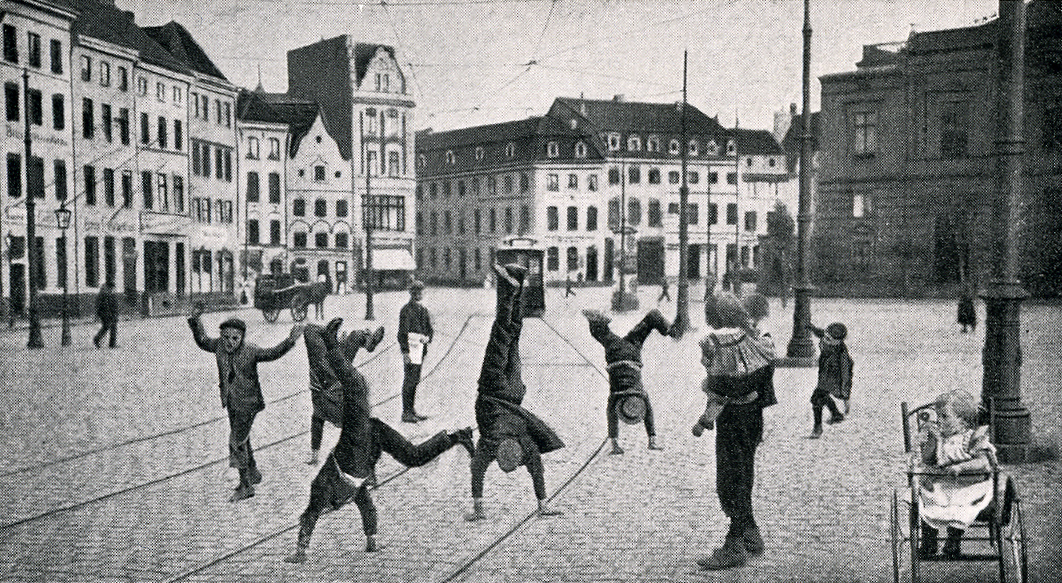
Boys and girls cartwheeling in Düsseldorf around 1906.

The Düsseldorf's cartwheeler (Radschläger in German) is the oldest tradition of Düsseldorf and became one of their famous landmarks. This tradition was honoured in 1954 by the erection of a fountain, called Cartwheeler's Fountain, in Düsseldorf's Burgplatz.

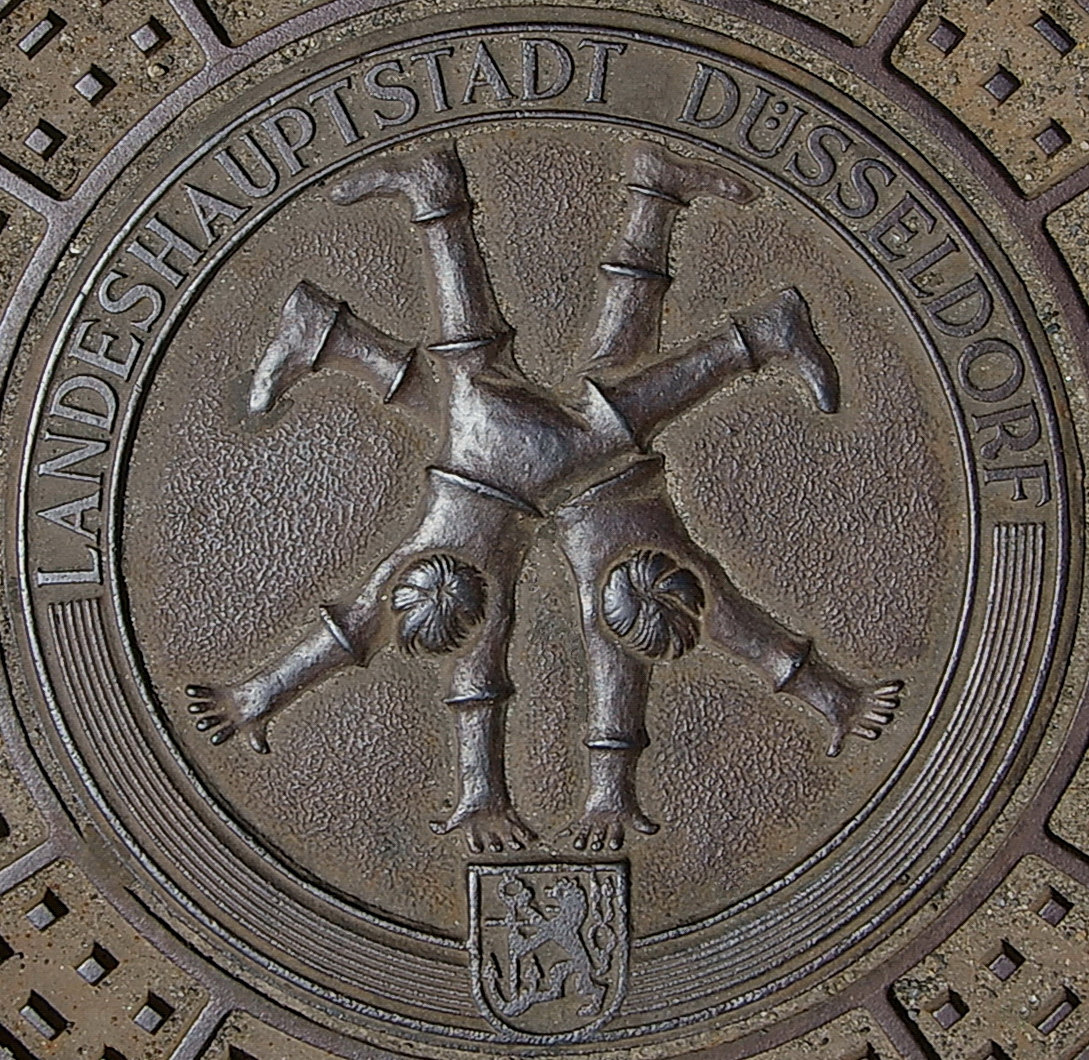
Street maintenance hole cover in Düsseldorf, featuring two cartwheeling children.

== Origin of the legend and history ==
The origin of the custom cannot be pinned down to a single historic event, but several stories have appeared around it.

The best known version is the battle of Worringen. Adolf VIII, Count of Berg, defeated the Archbishop of Cologne in this battle in 1288. As a result of the victory, Düsseldorf received city rights. According to the story, the custom stems from the population and especially the children running for joy and making cartwheels on the streets .

Another narrative style is about a wedding procession, in which the wedding carriage's wheel broke. To ward off the impending disaster, a boy jumped into a coach, and held the wheel. Whether the wedding was that of Jan Wellem and Anna Maria Luisa de' Medici or of the Margravine Jakobea of Baden and Johann Wilhelm of Jülich-Cleves-Berg, is controversial. In the story around the latter wedding, the bride is supposed to have been very unhappy with her marriage, but the cartwheelers and their coach's skills reportedly made her laugh.

In the late 19th century and early 20th century, many travelers came to the city for major exhibitions—the forerunners of today's fairs. The children discovered that cartwheels was a lucrative source of income, as the incoming bourgeois paid them up to a penny for what they thought was a "local and patriotic" symbol.

In 1945, after the war-evacuated Jan-Wellem monument was brought back to the city, not only torches and fanfare accompanied it, but also cartwheeling boys.

== Cartwheels in Düsseldorf's cityscape ==
Cartwheelers are found in several fountains in the city. The best known is Radschlägerbrunnen (Cartwheeler Fountain) in the Burgplatz, created in 1954 by Alfred Zschorsch, with Hans Müller-Schlösser's inscription "Radschläger wolle mer blieve, wie jeck et de Minschen och drieve" ("We want to keep being cartwheelers, no matter how crazy the world might be").

Friedrich Becker's Design from the late 1950s is the best known. His "Radschläger cube" from 1995 is now on Klosterstrasse in Düsseldorf.

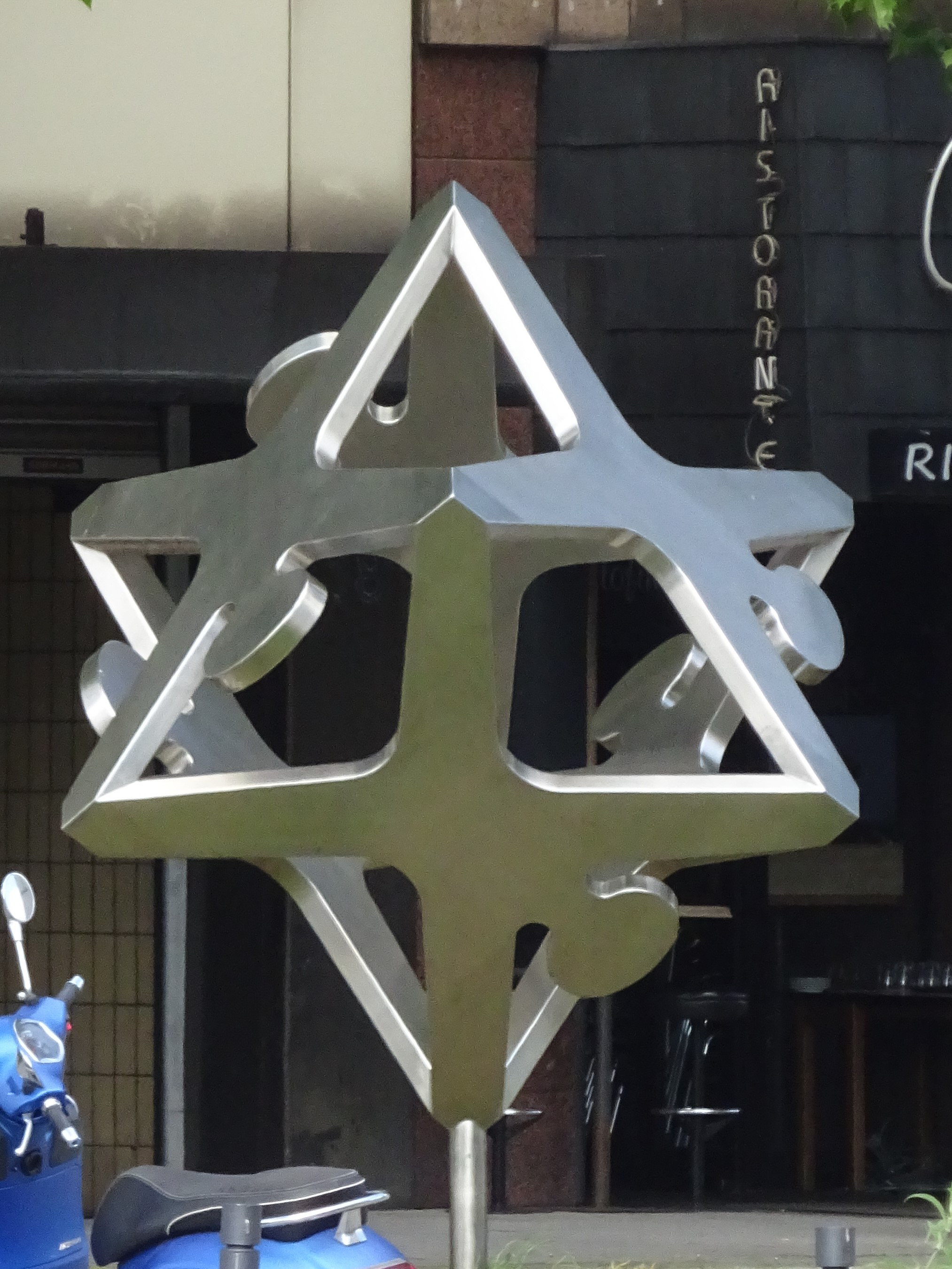
Radschlägerwürfel, Skulptur von Friedrich Becker, 1995

In 2022, a sculpture based on his design was erected at the Düsseldorf University of Applied Sciences (HSD).

The tradition is notably kept alive by the Alde Düsseldorf civil society of 1920, who conducted the first cartwheeler competition on 17 October 1937. Since 1971, it was held annually by boys and girls in June on the Königsallee, and since 2006 on the Rheinwerft below the old town and has become an integral part in the Düsseldorf event program. More than 500 boys and girls participate each year.

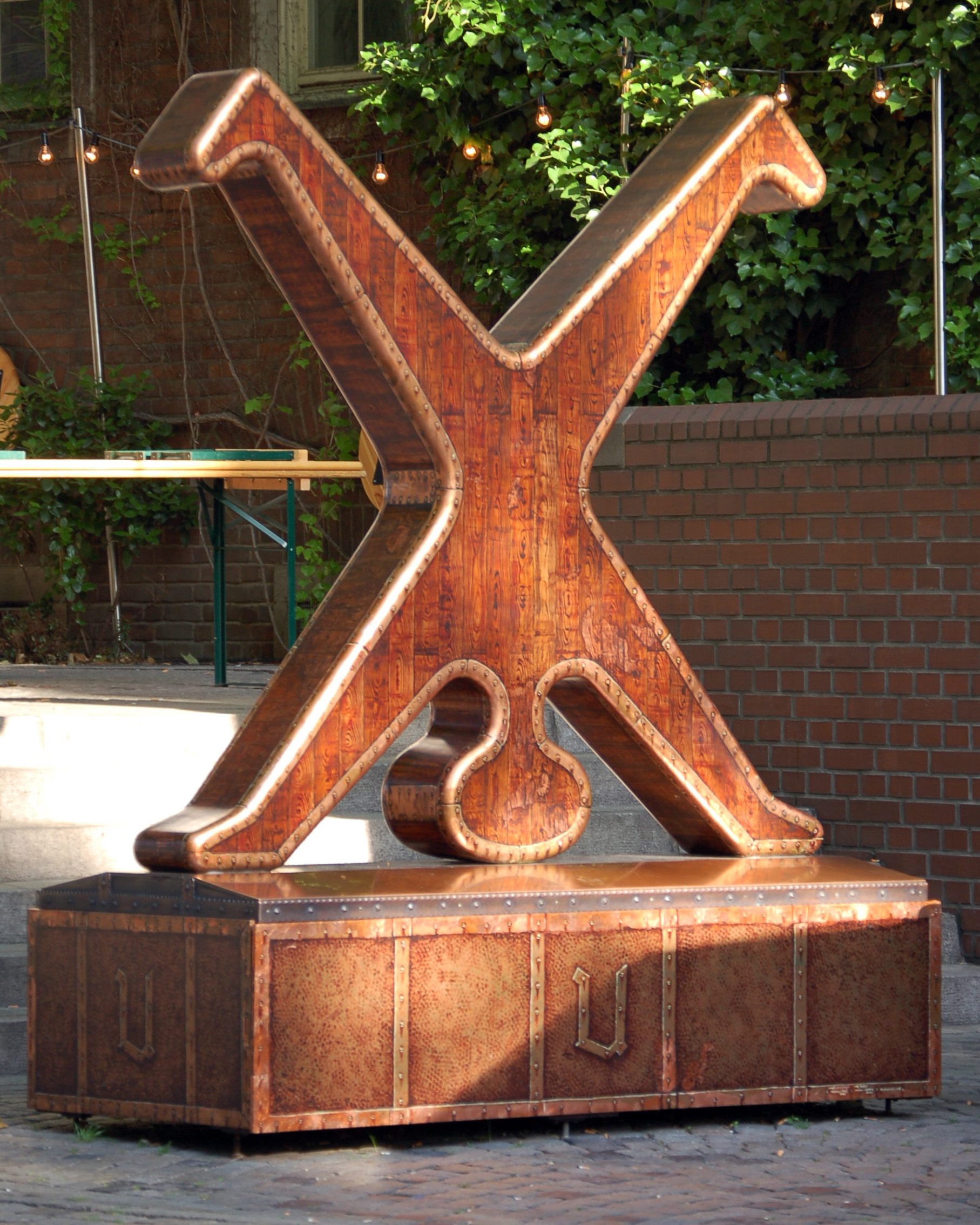
One of the sculptures of the Radschläger-Kunst project.

In 2001, the project Radschläger-Kunst (Cartwheeler-Art) started, consisting in the creation of over 100 cartwheeler sculptures by professional and amateur artists. The sculptures, which used Saint Lambertus Church door knockers as a starting model, are two meters high and wide and have a depth of 30 centimeters. They were distributed in the urban area and only a part was purchased at the end of the year from private individuals or companies.
