= 2015 in animation =

2015 in animation is an overview of notable events, including notable awards, list of films released, television show debuts and endings, and notable deaths.

== Events ==
=== January ===
- January 8: The Steven Universe episode "Warp Tour" premiered on Cartoon Network, which marks the debut of the beloved character Peridot (who initially started off as an antagonist, but later became a reformed supporting character on the show).
- January 18: The first episode of Star vs. the Forces of Evil airs on Disney Channel as a sneak peek (it later made its series premiere on March 30 on Disney XD).
- January 19: Boomerang was rebranded as part of a global rebranding effort, offering original programming for the first time. It continues to emphasize its archival programming, but with a greatly increased emphasis on the archive's most popular brands and an explicitly family-friendly approach. The main aim of the rebranding is for Boomerang to become a "second flagship" on par with Cartoon Network.
- January 22: Pacific Data Images closes down.
- January 31: The 42nd Annie Awards are held.

=== February ===
- February 3: The Scooby-Doo direct-to-video film Scooby-Doo! Moon Monster Madness releases on Digital services; later released on DVD on February 17.
- February 6: The second SpongeBob SquarePants movie, Sponge Out of Water, premieres in theaters.
- February 27: 87th Academy Awards:
  - Big Hero 6, by Don Hall, Chris Williams, and Roy Conli, wins the Academy Award for Best Animated Feature.
  - Feast, by Patrick Osborne and Kristina Reed, wins the Academy Award for Best Animated Short Film.
  - Hayao Miyazaki receives an Honorary Academy Award.

=== March ===
- March 8: The Family Guy episode "Stewie Is Enceinte" premieres on Fox. This episode was negatively received by fans due to them finding it as disturbingly gross, poorly written, and uncharacteristically sentimental.
- March 9: The Gravity Falls episode "Not What He Seems" premieres on Disney XD, the author of the journals is finally revealed in this episode, with it being Stan's lost long brother Ford. The episode brought in a total of 1.58 million viewers at its premiere.
- March 12: The Steven Universe two-part episodes "The Return/Jail Break" premiere on Cartoon Network, it is revealed that the character Garnet was actually a fusion composing of two gems named Ruby and Sapphire (who are in a relationship with each other) all this time. Despite this being the season finale, 4 remaining episodes from Season 1 still continued to air.
- March 13: Season 2 of Steven Universe begins on Cartoon Network with the premiere of the episode "Full Disclosure".
- March 28: Harvey Beaks premieres on Nickelodeon.

=== April ===
- April 2: The Steven Universe episode "Say Uncle" premieres on Cartoon Network, it is a non-canon crossover with Uncle Grandpa presented as an April Fools' Day joke (despite it airing a day after the actual holiday).
- April 16: Steven Universe finally concludes its first season with the episode "Shirt Club".
- April 27: The fifth and final season of The Garfield Show airs, which only consists of the four-part episode "Rodent Rebellion" while consequently ceasing production of the show.

=== May ===
- May 17:
  - The Simpsons concludes its 26th season on Fox with the episode "Mathlete's Feat", which features characters Rick Sanchez & Morty Smith from Adult Swim's Rick and Morty in the episode's couch gag. The season's finale was seen by over 2.8 million viewers that night.
  - Bob's Burgers concludes its fifth season on Fox with the following episodes:
    - "Hawk & Chick" (viewership: 1.95m)
    - "The Oeder Games" (viewership: 2.44m)
  - Family Guy concludes its 13th season on Fox with the episode "Take My Wife", guest starring Mae Whitman as Quagmire's girlfriend Kimi. The season's finale was seen by over 2.8 million viewers that night.

=== June ===
- June 1: American Dad! concludes its 12th season on TBS with the episode "Seizures Suit Stanny". The season's finale was seen by over 1.1 million viewers that night.
- June 12: The Phineas and Ferb hour-long Season 4 finale "Last Day of Summer" premiered simultaneously on Disney Channel and Disney XD, this was the original series finale of the show before it was greenlit for a 2-season revival in January 2023.
- June 19: Disney and Pixar's Inside Out premieres, becoming one of the most popular CG animated films ever made.

=== July ===
- July 3: Teen Titans Go!'s 100th episode "And the Award for Sound Design Goes to Rob" premieres on Cartoon Network.
- July 7: Cartoon Network announces the following season renewals for their shows in honor of there arrival to San Diego Comic-Con:
  - Adventure Time & Regular Show (Season 8)
  - Uncle Grandpa & Steven Universe (Season 3)
  - Clarence (Season 2)
- July 10: The Scooby-Doo direct-to-video film Scooby-Doo! and Kiss: Rock and Roll Mystery releases on Digital services; later released on DVD & Blu-ray on July 21. The movie is a crossover with the real-life band KISS.
- July 16: Pig Goat Banana Cricket premieres on Nickelodeon.
- July 17: Season 2 of BoJack Horseman premieres on Netflix.
- July 27: The first episode of We Bare Bears debuts on Cartoon Network.
- July 30: Teen Titans Go! concludes its second season on Cartoon Network with the episode "Some of Their Parts".
- July 31: Season 3 of Teen Titans Go! begins on Cartoon Network with the premiere of the episode "Cat's Fancy".

=== August ===
- August 27: Illumination's Minions becomes the first non-Disney animated film to gross over $1 billion.
- August 30: Aqua Teen Hunger Force, the longest-running Adult Swim show, airs its final episode.

=== September ===
- September 7: Total Drama Presents: The Ridonculous Race, the first spin-off of Total Drama, premieres. It was broadcast for its home country in the beginning of the following year. Tom McGillis confirmed in 2018 that further plans for anymore seasons of Total Drama would be delayed by focusing on spin-offs at the time.
- September 16:
  - Season 19 of South Park begins on Comedy Central with the premiere of the episode "Stunning and Brave".
  - Paw Patrol concludes its second season on TVO in Canada with the half-hour special "Pups Bark with Dinosaurs".
- September 21:
  - Star vs. the Forces of Evil concludes its first season on Disney XD with the half-hour finale "Storm the Castle".
  - New Looney Tunes premieres on Cartoon Network.
- September 23: The South Park episode "Where My Country Gone?" premieres, in which Mr. Garrison starts a presidential campaign, directly satirizing Donald Trump. Though intended as a one-shot joke, Garrison and his presidential career are continued in later seasons of the show, when Trump is elected president in 2016.
- September 26: The Mixels special "A Quest For the Lost Mixamajig" premiered on Cartoon Network.
- September 27:
  - Season 6 of Bob's Burgers begins on Fox with the premiere of the episode "Sliding Bobs". The season's premiere was seen by just over 2.5 million viewers that night.
  - Season 27 of The Simpsons begins on Fox with the premiere of the episode "Every Man's Dream", guest starring the following actors: Adam Driver, Lena Dunham, Laura Ingraham, Jemima Kirke, Zosia Mamet, and Allison Williams. The season's premiere was seen by over 3.2 million viewers that night.
  - Season 14 of Family Guy begins on Fox with the premiere of the episode "Pilling Them Softly". The season's premiere was seen by over 2.8 million viewers that night.
  - Teenage Mutant Ninja Turtles concludes its third season on Nickelodeon with the two-part special "Annihilation: Earth!". The season's finale was seen by only 1.43 million viewers that night.
- September 28: Danger Mouse 2015 TV series premiered on CBBC.

=== October ===
- October 5: "The '90s Are All That", a late-night program block featuring Nickelodeon live-action and animated series from the 1990s that has aired on TeenNick since 2011, relaunches as "The Splat" and expands from four hours to eight (running from 10:00 pm to 6:00 am.).
- October 10: The My Little Pony: Friendship Is Magic episode "Crusaders of the Lost Mark" premieres on Discovery Family, in which the Cutie Mark Crusaders finally get their cutie marks.
- October 12: The Gravity Falls episode "Dipper and Mabel vs. the Future" premieres on Disney XD, it serves as the prologue to the "Weirdmaggedon" arc.
- October 17: Richard Williams' Prologue premieres, which was his final project before his death in 2019.
- October 19: Miraculous: Tales of Ladybug and Cat Noir premieres.
- October 26: The first part in the Gravity Falls "Weirdmaggedon" arc premieres on Disney XD.
- October 27: Clarence concludes its first season on Cartoon Network with the Halloween episode "Spooky Boo".

=== November ===
- November 9: The stand-alone Phineas and Ferb hour-long special "O.W.C.A. Files" premieres on Disney XD, premiered on Disney Channel 2 months later.
- November 12: Music video for "Lone Digger", by Caravan Palace, was released on YouTube.
- November 20: Season 3 of Paw Patrol begins on Nickelodeon in the US with the episodes "Pups Find a Genie/Pups Save a Tightrope Walker". Season later premiered on TVO in Canada on November 28.
- November 23: The second part in the Gravity Falls "Weirdmaggedon" arc, titled "Escape from Reality", premieres on Disney XD.

=== December ===
- December 1: Pango Comptines was released on YouTube.
- December 4: Paw Patrol concludes its second season on Nickelodeon in the US with the episodes "Pups Save a Snowboard Competition/Pups Save a Chicken of the Sea".
- December 7: The first episode of Supernoobs airs on Cartoon Network.
- December 9: South Park concludes its 19th season on Comedy Central with the episode "PC Principal Final Justice". It was seen by over 1.8 million viewers that night.
- December 16: John Henry and the Inky-Poo, The Old Mill, and The Story of Menstruation are added to the National Film Registry.
- December 18: F is for Family debuts as the first Netflix original adult animated series.
- December 19: The final episodes of The Penguins of Madagascar premiere on Nicktoons.

=== Specific date unknown ===
- In the Flemish TV show, De Ideale Wereld on channel VIER, animated sequences titled Sociaal Incapabele Michiel are broadcast, created by Tom Borremans. These become very popular with viewers.

== Awards ==
- Academy Award for Best Animated Feature: Big Hero 6
- Academy Award for Best Animated Short Film: Feast
- Animation Kobe Feature Film Award: TBD
- Annecy International Animated Film Festival Cristal du long métrage: TBD
- Annie Award for Best Animated Feature: Inside Out
- Annie Award for Best Animated Feature — Independent: Boy and the World
- Asia Pacific Screen Award for Best Animated Feature Film: Miss Hokusai
- BAFTA Award for Best Animated Film: Inside Out
- César Award for Best Animated Film: The Little Prince
- European Film Award for Best Animated Film: Song of the Sea
- Golden Globe Award for Best Animated Feature Film: Inside Out
- Goya Award for Best Animated Film: Capture the Flag
- Japan Academy Prize for Animation of the Year: Stand by Me Doraemon
- Japan Media Arts Festival Animation Grand Prize: TBD
- Mainichi Film Awards - Animation Grand Award: Miss Hokusai

== Television series debuts ==
Date	Title	Channel	Year
January 12	Little Charmers	Nickelodeon, Nick Jr.	2015–2016
January 16	The Adventures of Puss in Boots	Netflix	2015–2018
January 18	Star vs. the Forces of Evil	Disney XD, Disney Channel	2015–2019
January 29	Like, Share, Die	Fusion TV	2015
February 6	Miles from Tomorrowland	Disney Junior	2015–2018
February 6	Wishenpoof!	Amazon Video	2015–2019
February 7	Pokémon the Series: XY Kalos Quest	Cartoon Network	2015
March 14	Transformers: Robots in Disguise	Cartoon Network	2015–2017
March 27	Inspector Gadget (2015)	Netflix, Universal Kids (Note: Known as Sprout until September 9, 2017.)	2015–2018
March 28	Harvey Beaks	Nickelodeon	2015–2017
April 16	Major Lazer	FXX	2015
April 30	Talking Tom and Friends	YouTube	2015–2021
May 22	H_{2}O: Mermaid Adventures	Netflix	2015
May 28	Chick Figures	Fusion Mondo YouTube	2015–2016
June 15	Fresh Beat Band of Spies	Nick Jr.	2015–2016
July 6	Lego Star Wars: Droid Tales	Disney XD	2015
July 16	Pig Goat Banana Cricket	Nickelodeon	2015–2018
July 27	We Bare Bears	Cartoon Network	2015–2020
August 1	Guardians of the Galaxy	Disney XD	2015–2019
August 3	ALVINNN!!! and the Chipmunks	Nickelodeon	2015–2023
August 10	Two More Eggs	Disney XD	2015–2017
August 14	Dinotrux	Netflix	2015–2018
August 24	Shimmer and Shine	Nickelodeon	2015–2020
August 25	Vixen	CW Seed	2015–2016
August 31	Da Jammies	Netflix	2015–present
September 2	Pickle and Peanut	Disney XD	2015–2018
September 7	Total Drama Presents: The Ridonculous Race	Cartoon Network	2015
September 9	Nina's World	Universal Kids (Note: Known as Sprout until September 9, 2017.)	2015–2016
September 12	Goldie & Bear	Disney Junior	2015–2018
September 16	Moonbeam City	Comedy Central	2015
September 18	PJ Masks	Disney Channel, Disney Junior, France 5, TF1	2015–2024
September 18	Descendants: Wicked World	Disney Channel	2015–2017
September 21	New Looney Tunes	Cartoon Network, Boomerang	2015–2020
October 1	DC Super Hero Girls	YouTube	2015–2018
October 5	Be Cool, Scooby-Doo!	Cartoon Network, Boomerang	2015–2018
October 8	SuperMansion	Sony Crackle	2015–2019
October 9	The Mr. Peabody & Sherman Show	Netflix	2015–2017
October 19	Miraculous: Tales of Ladybug & Cat Noir	TF1, Nickelodeon, Netflix, KidsClick, Disney Channel	2015–present
October 30	Popples	Netflix	2015–2016
November 2	Supernoobs	Cartoon Network, Teletoon	2015–2019
November 6	Care Bears & Cousins	Netflix	2015–2016
November 13	Blazing Team: Masters of Yo Kwon Do	Discovery Family	2015–2017
November 14	Bob the Builder (2015)	PBS Kids	2015–2018
November 22	The Lion Guard	Disney Junior	2015–2019
November 25	Nature Cat	PBS Kids	2015–2024
November 30	Long Live the Royals	Cartoon Network	2015
December 13	Nexo Knights	Cartoon Network	2015–2017
December 18	F Is for Family	Netflix	2015–2021
December 24	Dawn of the Croods	Netflix	2015–2017

== Television series endings ==
Date	Title	Channel	Year	Notes
January 10	Black Dynamite	Adult Swim	2012–2015	Ended
February 12	Wild Grinders	Nicktoons	2012–2015	Ended
February 14	Robot and Monster	Nicktoons	2012–2015	Ended
February 14	Astroblast!	Sprout	2014–2015	Ended
April 1	Curious George	PBS Kids	2006–2015	Ended, until revived by Peacock in 2020.
April 4	T.U.F.F. Puppy	Nicktoons	2010–2015	Ended
April 10	Fishtronaut	Discovery Kids (Latin America)	2009–2015	Ended
April 14	Brickleberry	Comedy Central	2012–2015	Ended
April 24	Team Umizoomi	Nick Jr.	2010–2015	Ended
June 12	Phineas and Ferb	Disney Channel, Disney XD,	2007-2015	Ended, until revived in 2025.
June 14	China, IL	Adult Swim	2011–2015	Ended
June 25	Major Lazer	FXX	2015	Cancelled
June 28	Hulk and the Agents of S.M.A.S.H.	Disney XD	2013–2015	Ended
July 3	Stone Quackers	FXX	2014–2015	Ended
July 15	H_{2}O: Mermaid Adventures	Netflix	2015	Ended
July 27	Randy Cunningham: 9th Grade Ninja	Disney XD	2012–2015	Ended
August 7	WordGirl	PBS Kids	2007–2015	Ended
August 9	Julius Jr.	Nick Jr.	2013–2015	Ended
August 30	Aqua Teen Hunger Force	Adult Swim	2001–2015	Ended
September 12	Strawberry Shortcake's Berry Bitty Adventures	Discovery Family	2010–2015	Ended
October 9	Total Drama Presents: The Ridonculous Race	Cartoon Network	2015	Ended
November 2	Lego Star Wars: Droid Tales	Disney XD	2015	Ended
November 8	Dick Figures	Mondo, YouTube	2010–2015	Ended
November 12	Yo Gabba Gabba!	Nickelodeon	2007–2015	Ended
November 30	Henry Hugglemonster	Disney Junior	2013–2015	Ended
December 3	Long Live the Royals	Cartoon Network	2015	Ended
December 9	Moonbeam City	Comedy Central	2015	Ended
December 19	The Penguins of Madagascar	Nicktoons	2008–2015	Ended
December 19	Pokémon the Series: XY Kalos Quest	Cartoon Network	2015	Ended

== Television season premieres ==
Date	Title	Season	Channel
March 5	Uncle Grandpa	2	Cartoon Network
March 13	Steven Universe	2	Cartoon Network
April 4	My Little Pony: Friendship Is Magic	5	Discovery Family
April 5	Breadwinners	2	Nickelodeon
June 26	Regular Show	7	Cartoon Network
July 7	The Amazing World of Gumball	4	Cartoon Network
July 17	BoJack Horseman	2	Netflix
July 17	Mickey Mouse	3	Disney Channel
July 26	Rick and Morty	2	Adult Swim (Cartoon Network)
July 31	Teen Titans Go!	3	Cartoon Network
August 3	Wander Over Yonder	2	Disney XD
September 7	Sanjay and Craig	3	Nickelodeon
September 16	South Park	19	Comedy Central
September 27	Bob's Burgers	6	Fox
September 27	Family Guy	14	Fox
September 27	The Simpsons	27	Fox
November 2	Adventure Time	7	Cartoon Network
November 20	Paw Patrol	3	Nickelodeon (Note: Season later premiered in Canada on TVO on November 28th.)
December 16	Uncle Grandpa	3	Cartoon Network

== Television season finales ==
Date	Title	Season	Channel
February 26	Uncle Grandpa	1	Cartoon Network
March 28	The Fairly OddParents	9	Nickelodeon
April 16	Steven Universe	1	Cartoon Network
April 26	Breadwinners	1	Nickelodeon
May 17	Bob's Burgers	5	Fox
May 17	Family Guy	13	Fox
May 17	The Simpsons	26	Fox
June 1	American Dad!	12	TBS
June 5	Adventure Time	6	Cartoon Network
June 9	Mickey Mouse	2	Disney Channel
June 12	Phineas and Ferb	4 (Note: Was originally the final season of the show before it got greenlit for 2 extra seasons in January 2023. Which the first season premiered just nearly 10 years later.)	Disney Channel/Disney XD
June 25	Regular Show	6	Cartoon Network
July 17	BoJack Horseman	2	Netflix
July 30	Teen Titans Go!	2	Cartoon Network
August 6	The Amazing World of Gumball	3	Cartoon Network
September 16	Paw Patrol	2	TVO (Note: Season later concluded in the US on Nickelodeon on December 4th.)
September 21	Star vs. the Forces of Evil	1	Disney XD
October 4	Rick and Morty	2	Adult Swim (Cartoon Network)
October 9	Sanjay and Craig	2	Nickelodeon
October 27	Clarence	1	Cartoon Network
December 9	South Park	19	Comedy Central
December 15	Uncle Grandpa	2	Cartoon Network
December 18	F Is for Family	1	Netflix

== Deaths ==
=== January ===
- January 6: Lance Percival, English actor, comedian and singer (voice of Paul McCartney and Ringo Starr in The Beatles, Old Fred in Yellow Submarine), dies at age 81.
- January 7: Rod Taylor, American actor (voice of Pongo in 101 Dalmatians), dies at age 84.
- January 10: Taylor Negron, American actor (voice of Starfinger in the Legion of Super Heroes episode "The Substitutes"), dies at age 57.
- January 13: José Luis Moro, Spanish animator and comics artist (La Familia Telérín), dies at age 88.
- January 15: Chikao Ohtsuka, Japanese voice actor (voice of Goemon Ishikawa XIII in Lupin III), dies at age 85.
- January 16:
  - Yao Beina, Chinese actress, comedian, singer, and songwriter (pop version of Let It Go), dies at age 33.
  - Walt Peregoy, American artist (The Walt Disney Company, Format Films, Hanna-Barbera), dies at age 89.
- January 22:
  - René Jodoin, Canadian animation director and producer (founder of French Animation Studio), dies at age 94.
  - Norman Henry Mamey, American composer, conductor, music arranger, musician and orchestrator (The Angry Beavers), dies at age 66.
- January 23: Barrie Ingham, English actor (voice of Basil in The Great Mouse Detective), dies at age 82.
- January 26: Stephen R. Johnson, American animator, painter, television director and music video director (Sledgehammer), dies at age 62.
- January 28: Phil Robinson, American animator (Hanna-Barbera, The Dreamstone), storyboard artist (Heathcliff, Alvin and the Chipmunks, The Electric Piper), writer, director (The Twisted Tales of Felix the Cat) and producer (co-founder of WildBrain), dies from pancreatic cancer at an unknown age.

=== February ===
- February 1: Monty Oum, American animator, animation director and voice actor (Rooster Teeth, Red vs. Blue), dies at age 33 after an allergic reaction.
- February 4: Carl Ritchie, American actor (voice of Bert the Turtle in Duck and Cover), dies at age 91.
- February 12: Gary Owens, American actor (voice of Space Ghost in Space Ghost, Blue Falcon in Dynomutt, Dog Wonder, the title character of Roger Ramjet, Powdered Toast Man in The Ren & Stimpy Show, Opening Narration in Buzz Lightyear of Star Command, Commander Ulysses Feral in SWAT Kats: The Radical Squadron, Announcer and Instructor in Garfield and Friends, Narrator in Adventures of Sonic the Hedgehog, Clown and Broadcaster #2 in Aaahh!!! Real Monsters, TV Announcer in 101 Dalmatians: The Series, Blue Falcon in Johnny Bravo), dies at age 80.
- February 20: Gérard Calvi, French composer (Astérix), dies at age 92.
- February 27:
  - Richard Bakalyan, Armenian-American actor (voice of M.C. Bird in It's Tough to be a Bird, Dinky in The Fox and the Hound), dies at age 84.
  - Tod Dockstader, American composer (Terrytoons, Kim Deitch) and sound effects artist (Tom and Jerry), dies at age 82.
  - Leonard Nimoy, American actor (voice of Spock in Star Trek: The Animated Series, Galvatron in The Transformers: The Movie, Mr. Moundshroud in The Halloween Tree, King Kashekim Nedakh in Atlantis: The Lost Empire, voiced himself in The Simpsons episodes "Marge vs. the Monorail" and "The Springfield Files", and the Futurama episodes "Space Pilot 3000" and "Where No Fan Has Gone Before"), dies at age 83.

=== March ===
- March 5: Gordon Kent, American animator (Fangface), storyboard artist (Ruby-Spears Enterprises, The Scooby and Scrappy-Doo Puppy Hour, Mork & Mindy/Laverne & Shirley/Fonz Hour, Tom and Jerry: The Fast and the Furry, Ben 10: Destroy All Aliens), sheet timer (Bureau of Alien Detectors, Life with Louie, X-Men: The Animated Series, Disney Television Animation, All Dogs Go to Heaven: The Series, Courage the Cowardly Dog, CatDog, Warner Bros. Animation, Stripperella, Codename: Kids Next Door, Holly Hobbie & Friends, Family Guy, Film Roman, The Land Before Time, Chowder, Adventure Time, Allen Gregory, Bob's Burgers, Brickleberry), lip sync artist (Dead Space: Aftermath), recording director (Scooby-Doo! in Arabian Nights, A Flintstones Christmas Carol), writer (Ruby-Spears Enterprises, Hanna-Barbera, Marvel Productions, Star Wars: Droids, Garbage Pail Kids, Tiny Toon Adventures, Beetlejuice, Mother Goose and Grimm, Disney Television Animation, Taz-Mania, The Real Shlemiel, Spider-Man, Pocket Dragon Adventures), producer (Hanna-Barbera, Bonkers) and director (Teen Wolf, The Prince of Atlantis, Disney Television Animation, The Grim Adventures of Billy & Mandy), dies at age 61.
- March 8: Sam Simon, American television director, producer, designer and writer (The Simpsons), dies at age 59.
- March 10: Allan Lurie, American actor (voice of Mezmaron in Pac-Man, Uglor the Alien in Space Stars), dies at age 91.
- March 12: Matt Landers, American actor (voice of Frankie in Batman: The Animated Series, Captain Logan in Bill & Ted's Excellent Adventures, Louie in the Batman Beyond episode "Terry's Friend Dates A Robot", Gang Leader in The New Batman Adventures episode "Growing Pains", Robber in the Superman: The Animated Series episode "Heavy Metal"), dies at age 62.
- March 30: Roger Slifer, American comic book writer, screenwriter, and television producer (Sunbow Entertainment), dies at age 60.

=== April ===
- April 1: Robert Walker, Canadian-American animator (Atkinson Film-Arts, The Raccoons, Walt Disney Animation Studios), storyboard artist (Dennis the Menace), background artist (COPS) and director (Brother Bear), dies from a heart attack at age 54.
- April 6: Cliff Voorhees, American comic book artist and background artist (Filmation, Hanna-Barbera, Marvel Productions, Garfield and Friends, Bobby's World, Mother Goose and Grimm, Tom and Jerry: The Movie, The Simpsons, The Critic, The Twisted Tales of Felix the Cat, The Shnookums & Meat Funny Cartoon Show, Timon & Pumbaa, The Story of Santa Claus, The Brave Little Toaster to the Rescue, King of the Hill, The Angry Beavers, The Brave Little Toaster Goes to Mars, Mad Jack the Pirate, The Grim Adventures of Billy & Mandy, Evil Con Carne), dies at age 85.
- April 7: Stan Freberg, American comedian and actor (voice of the beaver in Lady and the Tramp, Junior Bear and Pete Puma in Looney Tunes, Mo-Ron in Freakazoid!, Dr. Whipple in The Garfield Show), dies at age 88.
- April 9: Al Pabian, American animator (Chuck Jones, Peanuts specials), dies at age 97.

=== May ===
- May 4: Ellen Albertini Dow, American actress and drama coach (voice of See's Candies Box in Eight Crazy Nights, Helen Washburn and Old Woman #2 in American Dad!, Elderly Woman and Aunt Helen in Family Guy, Azma in The Emperor's New School episode "The Bride of Kuzco"), dies from pneumonia at age 101.
- May 10: Anita Gordon, American singer and actress (voice of the Harp in Fun and Fancy Free), dies at age 85.
- May 15: John Stephenson, American actor (voice of Mr. Slate in The Flintstones, Dr. Benton Quest in the first 5 episodes of Jonny Quest, various characters in the Scooby-Doo franchise, Fancy-Fancy in Top Cat, Doctor Doom and Magneto in The New Fantastic Four, X the Eliminator in Birdman and the Galaxy Trio, Colossus, Doctor Strange, and Loki in Spider-Man and His Amazing Friends, Huffer, Windcharger, Thundercracker, Alpha Trion, and Kup in The Transformers, continued voice of Doggie Daddy, John Arable in Charlotte's Web), dies at age 91–92.

=== June ===
- June 7: Christopher Lee, English actor (voice of King Haggard in The Last Unicorn, Pastor Galswells in Corpse Bride, Count Dooku in Star Wars: The Clone Wars), dies at age 93.
- June 11: Ron Moody, English actor, singer and composer (voice of Badger and Toad in The Animals of Farthing Wood, Noah the polar bear, Rocco the gorilla, Reg the mandrill, Squadron Leader the vulture in Noah's Island), dies at age 91.
- June 21: Roland Dupree, American actor, dancer, and choreographer (live-action model for the title character in Peter Pan), dies at age 89.
- June 22: James Horner, American composer and conductor (An American Tail, The Land Before Time, An American Tail: Fievel Goes West, Once Upon a Forest, We're Back! A Dinosaur's Story, The Pagemaster, and Balto), dies at age 61 in a plane crash.
- June 27: Jane Aaron, American illustrator and animator (Between the Lions, Sesame Street), dies at age 67 from cancer.
- June 28: Jack Carter, American comedian, actor and television presenter (voice of Wilbur Cobb in The Ren & Stimpy Show, Irwin Linker in King of the Hill, Harry in the Superman: The Animated Series episode "Warrior Queen", Tiresias in the Hercules episode "Hercules and the Griffin", Ziff Twyman in the Pinky, Elmyra & the Brain episode "That's Edutainment", Frieda's Grandfather in the Static Shock episode "Frozen Out", Old Man in the Family Guy episode "Grumpy Old Man", Sid in the Justice League Unlimited episode "This Little Piggy"), dies at age 93.
- June 30: Paolo Piffarerio, Italian comics artist and animator (La Lunga Calza Verde) and film producer (Gamma Film), dies at age 90.

=== July ===
- July 4: Valerio Ruggeri, Italian actor (Italian dub voice of Rabbit in Winnie the Pooh), dies at age 81.
- July 10: Roger Rees, Welsh actor and director (voice of Rathburn and Lord Theobine in The Legend of Prince Valiant, Prince Malcolm in Gargoyles, Betty in P.J. Sparkles, Edward in Return to Never Land, Ikon in the Phantom 2040 episode "The Sins of the Fathers: Part One", the Piper in the Extreme Ghostbusters episode "The Pied Piper of Manhattan"), dies at age 71.
- July 17: Alan Kupperberg, American comics artist and animator (Don Bluth), dies of thymus cancer at age 62.
- July 18:
  - Alex Rocco, American actor (voice of Roger Meyers Jr. in The Simpsons, Thorny in A Bug's Life, Larry in Pepper Ann, Bea Arthur and Soccer Mom in Family Guy, Carmine Falcone in Batman: Year One, Mr. Malone in the Bonkers episode "Frame That Toon", Lucky Rabbit in The Angry Beavers episode "Big Fun", Old Caddie in The Life & Times of Tim episode "The Caddy's Shack", additional voices in Lloyd in Space), dies from pancreatic cancer at age 79.
  - George Coe, American actor (voice of Arthur Woodhouse in Archer, Tee Watt Kaa in Star Wars: The Clone Wars, Toza in The Legend of Korra episode "A Leaf in the Wind", Albert Einstein in Celebrity Deathmatch, Miguel in Wrinkles), dies at age 86.
- July 24: Irvin S. Bauer, American playwright, educator and television writer (Bonkers, Courage the Cowardly Dog), dies from lymphoma at an unknown age.
- July 31: Roddy Piper, Canadian professional wrestler and actor (portrayed himself in Hulk Hogan's Rock 'n' Wrestling, voice of Bolphunga in Green Lantern: Emerald Knights, Don John in the Adventure Time episode "The Red Throne", himself in the Robot Chicken episode "Metal Militia"), dies at age 61.

=== August ===
- August 9: Susan Sheridan, English actress (voice of Princess Eilonwy in The Black Cauldron, Noddy in Noddy's Toyland Adventures), dies at age 68.
- August 13: Richard Manginsay, Filipino-born American animator (Anastasia, Bartok the Magnificent, Futurama, King of the Hill, The Simpsons, The Simpsons Movie), storyboard artist (Family Guy), character designer (The Simpsons, Dead Space: Downfall) and prop designer (The Simpsons), dies at age 43.
- August 17: Yvonne Craig, American actress (voice of Grandma Pig in Olivia), dies from cancer at age 78.
- August 22: Merl Reagle, American crossword constructor (voiced himself and provided the crossword puzzles in The Simpsons episode "Homer and Lisa Exchange Cross Words"), dies from acute pancreatitis at age 65.

=== September ===
- September 1: Dean Jones, American actor (voice of George Newton in Beethoven, Dean Arbagast in Batman & Mr. Freeze: SubZero, Ahasuerus in The Greatest Adventure: Stories from the Bible episode "Queen Esther", Dr. Karel in The Real Adventures of Jonny Quest episode "DNA Doomsday", Abraham Lincoln in the Nightmare Ned episode "Monster Ned", Sam Lane in the Superman: The Animated Series episode "Monkey Fun", Chauncey in the Adventures from the Book of Virtues episode "Trushworthiness"), dies at age 84.
- September 21: Yoram Gross, Polish-born Australian producer (Dot and the Kangaroo and its sequels), dies at age 88.

=== October ===
- October 6: Kevin Corcoran, American child actor (voice of the title character in Goliath II, Goofy Jr. in Aquamania), dies at age 66.
- October 21: Marty Ingels, American actor and comedian (voice of the title character in Pac-Man, Hathi in The Jungle Book: Mowgli's Story, Beegle Beagle in The Great Grape Ape Show, Autocat in Cattanooga Cats), dies from a stroke at age 79.
- October 27: Miyu Matsuki, Japanese actress (voice of Anna Nishikinomiya in Shimoneta, Choppy in Futari wa Pretty Cure Splash Star, Isumi Saginomiya in Hayate the Combat Butler, Kuko in Nyaruko: Crawling with Love), dies from lymphoma at age 38.

=== November ===
- November 2: Frank Budgen, English commercial director and co-founder of Gorgeous Enterprises (directed the NSPCC advert "Cartoon"), dies from cancer at age 61.
- November 3: Victor Wilson, American television writer (Nickelodeon Animation Studio), producer (The Adventures of Jimmy Neutron, Boy Genius) and actor (voice of Phuepal in Aaahh!!! Real Monsters, Bing in The Angry Beavers, Announcer in Rocket Power, Mr. Ward in As Told by Ginger), dies at age 51.
- November 16: Michael C. Gross, American artist, designer, and film producer (The Real Ghostbusters, Beethoven, Inspector Gadget Saves Christmas, Heavy Metal), dies at age 70.

=== December ===
- December 4: Robert Loggia, American actor (voice of Bill Sykes in Oliver & Company, Grandpa Jehan in The Dog of Flanders, Lew Peterson in the Tom Goes to the Mayor episode "Saxman", himself in the Family Guy episodes "Brothers & Sisters" and "Call Girl"), dies from Alzheimer's disease at age 85.
- December 28: Lemmy Kilmister, British singer and member of Motörhead (performed the song "You Better Swim" in The SpongeBob SquarePants Movie), dies at age 70.
- December 31:
  - Beth Howland, American actress (voice of Singer in the Batman Beyond episode "Out of the Past", Dr. Leventhal in the As Told by Ginger episode "And She Was Gone"), dies from lung cancer at age 76.
  - Natalie Cole, American singer, songwriter, and actress (singing voice of Sawyer in Cats Don't Dance, sang "Rise and Shine" in The Care Bears Adventure in Wonderland), dies at age 65.

=== Specific date unknown ===
- David Anderson, English film director (Dreamland Express), dies at age 62 or 63.
- Peg Dixon, Canadian actress (voice of Mrs. Claus in Rudolph the Red-Nosed Reindeer, Betty Brant in Spider-Man), dies at age 92.

== See also ==
- 2015 in anime
