= Speakeasy Rider =

- Bob's Burgers episode
- Episode no.: Season 5 Episode 9
- Directed by: Jennifer Coyle
- Written by: Rich Rinaldi
- Production code: 4ASA20
- Original air date: January 11, 2015

Guest appearances
- Kevin Kline as Mr. Fischoeder; Jon Daly as Sasha; Ron Lynch as Ron; Sam Seder as Hugo; Robert Ben Garant as Critter; Wendi McLendon-Covey as Mudflap; Joe Lo Truglio as Bryce

Episode chronology
← Previous "Midday Run"	Next → "Late Afternoon in the Garden of Bob and Louise"
- Bob's Burgers season 5

"Speakeasy Rider" is the ninth episode of the fifth season of the animated comedy series Bob's Burgers and the overall 76th episode, and is written by Rich Rinaldi and directed by Jennifer Coyle. It aired on Fox in the United States on January 11, 2015.

== Plot ==
The Belcher children join the go-kart racing league, enrolling as "Team Belcher" in the novice B-League using a remodeled bumper car. Louise designates herself the go-kart driver, much to Tina's irritation. Meanwhile, Gene learns the art of waving racing flags from Old Gus. Louise turns out to be a poor driver, while Tina demonstrates surprising adeptness at it. When Louise reasserts herself as the team driver anyway, Tina decides to join another team, feeling that Louise cares more about being the driver than doing what is best for the team. Tina's driving skills get her scouted into one of the top teams in the A-League, Team KIS, led by Sasha. Their aim is to beat fellow A-League driver Bryce, who always takes first place and frequently bullies the other league racers, earning him the moniker "Not Nice Bryce". Tina leaving Team Belcher causes friction between her and Louise, leading Louise to swear that she will ascend through B-League to earn a spot in the final race of the season and beat both Tina and Bryce. Indeed, Louise manages to improve her racing enough to win B-League and earn a spot in the final race.

On the big day, Team Belcher's go-kart suffers a last-minute breakdown that requires a quick patch-up from Critter. As the race narrows to Louise, Tina, and Bryce (in the lead), Bryce rams Louise's go-kart, causing its patch-up to fall away. In retaliation for the attack on her sister, Tina rams Bryce's go-kart, causing him to fall behind. With the race now down to Tina and Louise, Louise's damaged go-kart begins to break down right before the finish line, eventually spinning out to a full stop. Though Sasha urges her to ignore her sister and claim victory, Tina declares her allegiance to Team Belcher and pulls her go-kart right behind Louise's, pushing her the rest of the way. The two reconcile and say the other deserves to win, though Louise is pushed through the finish line during their reconciliation, thus winning the race. Tina and Louise share their first-place trophy by sleeping in the same bed with it between them.

Meanwhile, Bob and Linda find that Teddy's home-brewed beer pairs excellently with their burgers and begin selling it in their restaurant. Knowing that selling home-brewed beer in an eating establishment is illegal, they try to deceive Hugo when he comes to give his health inspection. After numerous ruses, Hugo finally tells Bob that he knows what he is doing, but has been ordered by his boss not to waste any more department time investigating.

== Reception ==
Alasdair Wilkins of The A.V. Club gave the episode an A−, praising the writers' continued examinations of the relationship between Tina and Louise, calling it "the defining relationship for this season." However, Wilkins felt that Gene's relationship to his sisters remained unexplored in the show, stating, "...[I]t’d be great to see Bob’s Burgers dig further into Gene and how he relates to his fellow Belchers, particularly when the results with Tina and Louise have been so great." Robert Ham of Paste gave the episode a 9.3 out of 10, stating, "At some point everyone around is going to own up to the fact that Bob’s Burgers is not just the best animated series on TV, but the best sitcom on network TV. If the fact that it was just picked up by FOX for a sixth season wasn’t enough, this sturdy, funny, and heartfelt episode should offer up ample proof of its greatness."

The episode received a 1.6 rating and was watched by a total of 3.34 million people, which made it the third-most-watched show on Fox that night, behind Family Guy and The Simpsons, but ahead of Mulaney and Brooklyn Nine-Nine.
