= Late Afternoon in the Garden of Bob and Louise =

- Bob's Burgers episode
- Episode no.: Season 5 Episode 10
- Directed by: Boohwan Lim; Kyounghee Lim
- Written by: Jon Schroeder
- Production code: 4ASA19
- Original air date: January 25, 2015

Guest appearances
- Kurt Braunohler as Logan; Tim Meadows as Mike; Lindsey Stoddart as Cynthia

Episode chronology
← Previous "Speakeasy Rider"	Next → "Can't Buy Me Math"
- Bob's Burgers season 5

"Late Afternoon in the Garden of Bob and Louise" is the tenth episode of the fifth season of the animated comedy series Bob's Burgers and the overall 77th episode, and is written by Jon Schroeder and directed by Boohwan Lim and Kyounghee Lim. It aired on Fox in the United States on January 25, 2015.

== Plot ==
Bob receives a rejection letter after applying for a plot at the local community garden. He goes to see the garden master, Cynthia Bush, who does not get along with Linda, and who is the mother to Logan, Louise's enemy. Bob learns from Cynthia that Logan is working there to write an entrance essay on terrible jobs that build character for a summer college prep program. Bob offers to hire Logan as an unpaid intern and Cynthia grants him a plot at the garden.

Louise is not happy with the decision at first, but agrees when Bob tells her that having the garden plot will be good for all of them and that she must accept it for the "greater good". Gene gets along well with Logan, as there is now another boy in the restaurant, and Tina continually asks him about teenage boys. However, Logan continues to antagonize Louise and denigrate his job.

Cynthia begins to frequent the restaurant to write Logan's essay. This irritates Linda, as she is condescending and critical of the restaurant while she is there. After a while, Linda and Louise finally snap with Linda threatening to destroy Cynthia's laptop and Louise threatening to slap Logan. This results in Cynthia revoking Bob's plot and leaving with Logan. Bob pleads with her and he agrees to make Logan employee of the month in order to keep the plot. This causes Louise to quit, as Bob has effectively chosen Logan over her, his own daughter.

Louise stays up in the apartment while Logan is in the restaurant. She fires spitballs at Logan through the crawl space and taunts him. Bob tells Louise to stop, but while he berates her through the crawl space vent and tells her once again to support the "greater good", Louise takes Bob's hedge clippers and heads off to the garden to destroy Bob's plot. Bob chases her, but cannot crawl through the locked fence to stop her. While trying to talk Louise out of it, he refers to his plants as his babies in front of her and he realizes that he cared more for his plant "children" than his actual children. Louise spares Bob's plants and forgives him on the condition that she get to fire Logan herself. She does so and Cynthia again revokes Bob's plot, but Bob has already safely transported his plants to his home. The episode ends with Bob and Louise planting them in a window box, which falls to the ground under the weight of the plants and soil.

== Reception ==
Alasdair Wilkins of The A.V. Club gave the episode a B, saying "'Late Afternoon In The Garden Of Bob And Louise' is another very solid episode for Bob’s Burgers, albeit one that doesn’t end up finding as much to say about its title characters as one might hope. The father-daughter relationship between Bob and Louise is one of the show’s most stealthily sweet relationship—there may be no more heartwarming moment in the show’s entire five-year run than the end of “Carpe Museum”—but this episode ends up being far more about the conflict between them than any real moments of bonding."

Robert Ham of Paste gave the episode a 9.5 out of 10, saying "Bob’s Burgers has often achieved that nice balance of injecting little graceful, heartfelt moments into the mix without overshadowing the absurdity. This episode was a perfect example of that, with Bob and Louise coming to an understanding about their respective desires, and each realizing how ridiculous they were acting in the midst of the chaos. It was a tender moment but undercut just so by the fact that Bob was squeezed into the small opening of a locked fence gate while he was opening up to his daughter."

The episode received a 1.2 rating and was watched by a total of 2.49 million people. This made it the fourth most watched show on Fox that night, behind Brooklyn Nine-Nine, The Simpsons and Family Guy, but ahead of Mulaney.
