= Friends with Burger-fits =

- Bob's Burgers episode
- Episode no.: Season 5 Episode 3
- Directed by: Tyree Dillihay
- Written by: Dan Fybel
- Production code: 4ASA11
- Original air date: November 16, 2014

Guest appearances
- Keegan-Michael Key as Darnell; Brian Huskey as Regular Sized Rudy; Tim Meadows as Mike; Tim Heidecker as Kevin

Episode chronology
← Previous "Tina and the Real Ghost"	Next → "Dawn of the Peck"
- Bob's Burgers season 5

"Friends with Burger-fits" is the third episode of the fifth season of the animated comedy series Bob's Burgers and the overall 70th episode, and is written by Dan Fybel and directed by Tyree Dillihay. It aired on Fox in the United States on November 16, 2014.

== Plot ==
After Teddy tells Bob that his recent physical exam revealed his health to be incredibly poor and that he must make drastic changes to his eating habits, Bob decides to cut him off from his burgers, believing that serving him burgers every day was partially responsible for Teddy's health problems. Teddy desperately resolves to get better through exercise so he can continue eating burgers, and Bob agrees to join him out of guilt. Teddy, through a misunderstanding, also believes that this means Bob considers him his best friend, a sentiment Teddy also feels for Bob. In reality, Bob doesn't consider Teddy to be his best friend so much as his best customer who he sees every day, but doesn't wish to hurt Teddy's feelings or stymie his fitness attempts by telling him the truth. Excited, Teddy signs them both up for an intensive "stunt man" boot camp. The experience is nightmarish for Bob. During a hellish exercise routine, Bob explains to the boot camp counselors that Teddy isn't even his friend, but just his customer and that he lied about their friendship to him so that he would have an exercise buddy and get healthy. Unfortunately, Teddy overhears everything.

Furious, Teddy asks Bob how he could lie to him about their relationship, and Bob says that he lied because he cares about him. Teddy states that from now on, he is going to hang out at a different burger joint, called Dusty's Feedbag, ignoring Bob's attempts to apologize and his pleas that he still keep his health in mind. Bob is dejected, but is horrified when he learns that Dusty's Feedbag has a food challenge called the "Belt Buckle Belly Buster," where the patron is served a five-pound burger and will get their meal for free and their picture on the wall if they manage to eat it within thirty minutes. Bob races to the restaurant to stop Teddy, knowing he will order it. Indeed, Teddy ordered the food challenge, but Bob pleaded with the restaurant owner not to serve it to him because it could kill him. The manager takes the stance that regardless of Teddy's health, Teddy still paid for it and he will serve him anyway. Bob's increasing protestation escalates into a fight between him and the owner, resulting in the owner violently throwing him through the window and out into the street. Teddy helps Bob up outside and states that what Bob tried to do was the nicest thing anyone had ever done for him. Teddy takes him home and tells him it's okay that Bob doesn't consider him his best friend. Bob apologizes and tells him that he does consider Teddy his best friend after all.

Meanwhile, the Belcher kids create a makeshift ice rink out of the freezer storage room in the restaurant's basement and invite their schoolmates to play a game they invented, where they try to make one another slip and fall on the ice. Upon discovering what they're doing, Linda is delighted. She revamps it as a cage match-style tournament called "Freezerdome" (à la Mad Max Beyond Thunderdome), with herself as the referee, the kids in flamboyant costumes, and the prize being an elaborate championship belt. Through a series of sly tactics, Louise prevails as the champion.

== Reception ==
Alasdair Wilkins of The A.V. Club gave the episode a B, citing the relatively weak main plot and sub-plot, stating,"'Friends With Burger-Fits' isn’t the episode you show people to convince them that Bob’s Burgers is one of the best shows on television, but it’s still a damn funny episode." Robert Ham of Paste gave the episode an 8.8 out of 10, describing the main story to be a perfect example of the series' ability to perfectly balance the absurd and the emotional.

The episode received a 1.7 rating and was watched by a total of 3.35 million people. This made it the fourth most watched show on Fox that night, losing to Brooklyn Nine-Nine, Family Guy, and The Simpsons.
