= Adventures in Chinchilla-sitting =

- Bob's Burgers episode
- Episode no.: Season 5 Episode 15
- Directed by: Cecilia Aranovich
- Written by: Mike Benner
- Production code: 5ASA03
- Original air date: March 15, 2015

Guest appearances
- Doug Benson as Dave; Andy Richter as Wayne; Paul Rust as Jonas; Jenny Slate as Tammy; Eddie Pepitone as Reggie

Episode chronology
← Previous "L'il Hard Dad"	Next → "The Runway Club"
- Bob's Burgers season 5

"Adventures in Chinchilla-sitting" is the 15th episode of the fifth season of the animated comedy series Bob's Burgers and the overall 82nd episode, and is written by Mike Benner and directed by Cecilia Aranovich. It aired on Fox in the United States on March 15, 2015.

== Plot ==
Linda is singing about the date night she and Bob are having that night. The kids come home, with Louise carrying Princess Little Piddles, the class chinchilla. Tina successfully negotiates $3/hour for babysitting.

As Louise is playing with the chinchilla, Wayne, who usually takes care of the chinchilla, barges into the house and begins arguing with Louise. As Wayne left the door open, the chinchilla escapes, and Jonas takes him after finding him on the sidewalk.

Trying to find the chinchilla, the kids and Wayne go to Reggie's sub shop, which turns out to be closed. They go to his house, an Reggie doesn't know where he is. Jonas and his friend's mothers both think their children are doing homework at the other child's house. To find them, they go to Tammy.

After being asked, Tammy finds out that Jonas is at a high school party via social media. They proceed to sneak into the party, and discover that Jonas gave the chinchilla to Vanessa, a girl he has a crush on. They find out that Vanessa and her friends are at the roller rink.

They are able to convince Jonas to come with them to the roller rink, where they find that Vanessa sold the chinchilla to a security guard for $40. He accepts the offer for them to buy him back, but the chinchilla has escaped. After finding him on the roller rink, the strobe lights give the chinchilla a seizure. They manage to get the chinchilla and get home uncaught.

Once home, Louise and Wayne proceed to argue again over who should get the chinchilla. They put the chinchilla in between them, and it goes to Louise.

Meanwhile, Bob reveals that the date is bar trivia, which they quickly prove to be terrible at. After Linda steals the answer sheet, they soar into first place before being caught. After being kicked out for cheating, they start making out.

Bob and Linda go home to find Wayne running out the door crying. Feeling bad, Louise goes to his house and gives him back the chinchilla.

== Reception ==
Alasdair Wilkins of The A.V. Club gave the episode a B−, saying, "As it is, “Adventures In Chinchilla-Sitting” has lots of little moments that work, but its story never coheres into something bigger, and its jokes just aren’t hilarious enough to make that fact not matter. Still, as lowlights go, Bob’s Burgers’ remain pretty damn good." The episode received a 1.0 rating and was watched by a total of 2.24 million people. This made it the fifth most watched show on Fox that night, behind Brooklyn Nine-Nine, Family Guy, The Simpsons, and The Last Man on Earth.
