= The Gayle Tales =

- Bob's Burgers episode
- Episode no.: Season 5 Episode 13
- Directed by: Ian Hamilton
- Written by: Lizzie Molyneux; Wendy Molyneux
- Production code: 5ASA01
- Original air date: March 1, 2015

Guest appearances
- Megan Mullally as Gayle; Rich Fulcher as Stacy

Episode chronology
← Previous "The Millie-churian Candidate"	Next → "L'il Hard Dad"
- Bob's Burgers season 5

"The Gayle Tales" is the 13th episode of the fifth season of the animated comedy series Bob's Burgers and the overall 80th episode, and is written by Lizzie Molyneux and Wendy Molyneux and directed by Ian Hamilton. It aired on Fox in the United States on March 1, 2015.

== Plot ==
Gayle arrives at Bob's Burgers in tears because her date for the evening Stacy canceled and she had theater tickets to see “Yarnival”. Desperate to get out of the house after being grounded, the kids compete to be Aunt Gayle's "date" for the evening via an essay contest.

=== The Ballad of Gayle and Jo-Gene ===
Gene writes a story about him and Linda being a country western duo called Lindette and Jo-Gene. They are playing a show where Lou Belchera (Louise), a Hollywood singing agent, is in attendance. After the show, Lou offers to manage Lindette as a solo artist. Frustrated, Jo-Gene leaves and goes to a Soda Bar.

He encounters Gayle singing while working as a waitress and Jo-Gene, realizing her vocal potential, teams up with her to form a new duo as Gayle and Jo-Gene. They win the competition (Despite Lindette sabotaging their performance) with a song loosely based on the song "We'll Get Ahead Someday" by Dolly Parton and Porter Wagoner, and Belchera takes them on and takes them to Hollywood to see the Hollywood sign and meet Scott Bakula. Lindette ends up marrying the drunk in the Soda Bar (Bob).

=== Lady Chatter-teeth’s Lover ===
Tina writes a romantic story in a Regency era-style setting reminiscent of Pride and Prejudice. Said story is about the Chatter-teeth sisters Gayle, Tina, Eugenia (Gene) and Louisa (Louise). Tina longs to marry Lord Jimmy, Jr. but according to the law of the land, she cannot do so until Gayle marries first. Tina attempts to find Gayle a match but can only think of Theodore the blacksmith (Teddy).

Then Sir Bob Belcher, Lord and heir of the Belcher Burger fortune shows up and the sisters offer Gayle up to him. Linda briefly interrupts the story not wanting Gayle to be married off to Bob.

The night of the ball arrives and everyone from the town is there, Bob and Gayle dance all evening but Linda appears as Sir Bob’s loud, rude, American wife-to-be that he is only marrying for money. This causes Gayle to fall deathly ill with pooping cough. They call the vicar around to give her the last rites who happens to be Scott Bakula. This makes Gayle all better and they Quantum Leap into the future to the day of the double wedding of Gayle and Scott Bakula and Tina and Lord Jimmy, Jr.. Bob and Linda also have a baby but it was born with a tail because they were cousins. This leads to Linda to iterate that she and Bob are not cousins, or at least that they know of.

=== Gayle of Thrones ===
Louise writes a story based on the TV series Game of Thrones set in “Catsteros” (a parody of Westeros). Gayle is Queen of Catsteros who is receiving an official visit from Litter-boxia on behalf of her sister Lindaryen (Linda). Tina presents her with Gene from the House of the Unfarting, a Warlock with disappearing powers which he uses to steal her cat dragons (Jean Pawed Van Damme, Pinkeye and Mr. Business).

Gayle sets out on a quest with the bravest knight, Knight Louise to find the cat dragons. Along the way they get held prisoner three times. Eventually they arrive at Litter-Boxia where there are white talkers everywhere (Multiple Teddy’s telling stories). They arrive at the castle and challenge Lindaryen to a duel to the death. Lindaryen unleashes the Mort-ain (Mort) to fight in the duel but Louise succeeds by slapping him with her Burgarean Slapper Sword and making him fall into the pit of ravenous porcelain babies.

Bobdor (Bob), who is Lindaryen’s fool, is insulted when Lindaryen mentions that she should get a new fool as he is not skinny or hot. This causes him to throw Lindaryen into the pit. The cats are rescued and they fly home on them. Scott Bakula suddenly appears and Gayle falls for him. Bobdor realizes he is a third wheel in all this and throws himself off the cat dragon.

=== Epilogue ===
Gayle is impressed with all three of the kids’ stories. They make her feel that she is talented and wonderful and that she does not need Stacy. Then Stacy walks in offering to go on the date as his emergency canceled, they go out on the date. The kids are frustrated that they are still grounded.

It’s then revealed that the kids were grounded for pulling a prank on Linda at the supermarket where Tina and Louise got her to open the ice cream freezer while Gene grabbed her legs. This caused her to fall over into a pile of maxi-pads and fart. Linda does not see the funny side of things as she had to buy all the maxi-pads and farted again when she had her bags handed back.

Linda eventually agrees that it was funny and that they are grounded for the evening while Linda watches over them in the apartment. They leave the restaurant to do so and Bob is upset that they all left before closing time. Bob says that he “should’ve gone with Gayle”.

== Reception ==
Alasdair Wilkins of The A.V. Club gave the episode a B−, saying, "As a whole, “The Gayle Tales” has ambition and jokes to spare, and that proves to be a good thing, as it’s enough to make up for the fact that it’s just a tad too complicated for its own good." The episode received a 1.4 rating and was watched by a total of 3.03 million people. This made it the fourth most watched show on Fox that night, behind Brooklyn Nine-Nine, The Simpsons and The Last Man on Earth.
