= Itty Bitty Ditty Committee =

- Bob's Burgers episode
- Episode no.: Season 5 Episode 17
- Directed by: Bernard Derriman
- Written by: Holly Schlesinger
- Production code: 5ASA05
- Original air date: April 26, 2015

Guest appearances
- Aziz Ansari as Darryl; Brian Huskey as Regular Sized Rudy; David Herman as Trev; Ron Lynch as Ron; Sam Seder as Hugo

Episode chronology
← Previous "The Runway Club"	Next → "Eat, Spray, Linda"
- Bob's Burgers season 5

"Itty Bitty Ditty Committee" is the 17th episode of the fifth season of the animated comedy series Bob's Burgers and the overall 84th episode, and is written by Holly Schlesinger and directed by Bernard Derriman. It aired on Fox in the United States on April 26, 2015.

== Plot ==
The episodes starts with Linda talking on the phone about a rash that has developed underneath her armpits. Meanwhile, outside the restaurant, Gene is playing his keyboard in the burger suit to help drum up business outside Bob's Burgers. He is accompanied by Tina and Louise who are sliding straws through lids of to-go cups. Then Regular Sized Rudy and Peter Pescadero see them as they are returning from orchestra practice with their instruments. They jam successfully and the band Itty Bitty Ditty Committee is born. They later recruit Darryl after hearing him sing the Hall & Oates song "Maneater" in the computer lab. They try to recruit him and are able convince him to join the band. While the children practice, they begin to harmonize and are noticed by Lenny DeStefano who asks them to play at his birthday party. The children continue to practice but Darryl starts talking about creating a practice schedule, while Gene on the other hand is apathetic as he thinks it's waste of time to practice.

Meanwhile, the band begins to have conflicting differences between Darryl and Gene's styles of music as Darryl wants to play music that would go beyond a single beat. Gene becomes disturbed when Darryl demonstrated his point on Gene's keyboard. The final straw happens as Darryl, Peter, and Rudy are practicing without Gene. They tell Gene that they have decided to kick him and his sisters out of the band due to their conflicting ideals. Gene is upset by these events and has become convinced he shouldn't be playing music anymore and gives up his keyboard. His sisters try to get Gene to rediscover his love for music by pretending to destroy his keyboard. The gang decides to play outside like earlier in the episode. As the kids play they start to attract a crowd who are amazed by the children's abilities. Gene regains his confidence and is soon sought out by Darryl, Peter, and Rudy who realized that they missed Gene and were bored without him. Gene soon rejoins the band and leads the band and the crowd to Lenny's birthday party.

Meanwhile, Linda is ordered by her doctor not to shave for a while until the rash clears up. This leads to some unfortunate events as Linda's pit hair grow at a large rate and becomes uncomfortable for the rest of the customers. Linda tries to avoid people by hiding in the kitchen, but Hugo and Ron show up for an inspection and force Linda to wear hair nets on her arm pits. After this she decides to shave her armpits but Bob convinces her to follow through with the doctors orders and try alternative cures to heal the rash. Linda's rash eventually clears up and Bob informs her that she can finally shave until she realizes she likes her pit hair.

== Reception ==
Alasdair Wilkins of The A.V. Club gave the episode a B+, saying, "After a lengthy hiatus, 'Itty Bitty Ditty Committee' feels like Bob's Burgers just sort of easing back into things. It's a reliably funny, charming episode that builds to a terrific crescendo, with the kids' storefront concert actually bringing together usual Belcher nemeses like Edith and Jimmy Pesto's lackey Trev in support of the kids. Taken with the reprise of 'Burgers And Fries' over the closing credits, it all adds up to a fine reaffirmation that Bob's Burgers just doing what comes naturally represents one of the most enjoyable half-hours on TV." The episode received a 0.9 rating and was watched by a total of 2.04 million people. This made it the fifth most watched show on Fox that night, behind Brooklyn Nine-Nine, Family Guy, The Simpsons, and The Last Man on Earth.
