= Housetrap =

- Bob's Burgers episode
- Episode no.: Season 5 Episode 19
- Directed by: Jennifer Coyle; Bernard Derriman
- Written by: Dan Fybel
- Production code: 5ASA07
- Original air date: May 10, 2015

Guest appearance
- Kaitlin Olson as Helen

Episode chronology
← Previous "Eat, Spray, Linda"	Next → "Hawk & Chick"
- Bob's Burgers season 5

"Housetrap" is the 19th episode of the fifth season of the animated comedy series Bob's Burgers and the overall 86th episode. It was written by Dan Fybel and directed by Jennifer Coyle and Bernard Derriman. It aired on Fox in the United States on May 10, 2015. In this episode, the family gets stuck in a terrible storm while helping Teddy secure a beach house in Craggy Neck. The storm is the least of their worries, however, when they are forced to take shelter with the mysterious owner of the home.

The episode received a loose follow-up in Season 9's "The Helen Hunt", which sees the return of Helen, the mysterious homeowner introduced in this episode. This episode won the Writers Guild of America Award for Outstanding Writing in Animation at the 68th Writers Guild of America Awards.

== Plot ==
Teddy reveals that for extra income, he sometimes aids in the maintenance of a beach house in Craggy Neck owned by a widow named Helen. To help him out, Linda offers to drive over to move the patio furniture inside so it will not be ruined in the upcoming storm. Bob and the kids join her.

Once there, the family is impressed by the view and leaves Bob to drag in the furniture alone. Meanwhile, Louise and Linda enter the unlocked house and soon the entire family is exploring. Through pictures Linda and Louise begin to snoop around the house, discovering that the owner of the house was a man named Larry Goodwin by reading the mail in the home office. They open the drawers at the desk and discover that all the pictures in the house are of the second wife when they find a wedding picture depicting a younger Larry with a different woman.

Teddy arrives to check up on the Belchers and is shocked to see them inside the home. When Linda accuses Larry of dumping his first wife for a younger, prettier model, Teddy reveals that Larry died before he started working there by falling off of the widow's walk onto the decorative boulders below. When Linda makes the connection that the boulders were picked by the second wife, Helen, and that she had murdered Larry for his clock fortune, Teddy defends her saying that her husband fell off the widow's walk on the roof and that, though the railing was loose, it was impossible that Helen loosened it as she has no tools and thus has hired Teddy. Teddy also believes that Helen may have hired him because she was lonely, indicating that he has a crush on her. Linda decides to reenact what she thinks happened: Helen pushing Larry off the widow's walk. With Bob in Larry's place and Linda in Helen's she pushed Bob onto the floor, injuring his back in the process.

A storm begins and Helen unexpectedly arrives at the beach house. Helen has a strange way of joking, saying cruel or acerbic things, and then laughing it off. Bob finds her charming, especially after she gives him pain relievers to aid his bad back, while Linda and Louise become paranoid and fear for the safety of their family. Knowing Teddy has a crush on Helen, Bob asks Linda to stop interfering between them, saying Linda's going to ruin his chances. Later, drugged on pain relievers, Bob tells Helen she is nice and reveals to her that Linda thinks she is a murderer.

Helen takes Linda up to the widow's walk and tells her that she never killed her husband. When Linda backs away from her she slips and falls over the railing, but is pulled up by Helen. The rest of the family arrives, and Louise attacks Helen, trying to save her mother. However, Linda reveals that she no longer believes Helen is a murderer after she pulled her to safety. Teddy, meanwhile, does fall off the roof but is saved when he lands on mud instead of the rocks. As the rest of the family gathers around Teddy and helps him up, Bob reaches into the mud and discovers a box filled with a hammer and pulled-out nails, indicating that Helen really did murder her husband. In his still-drugged state, Bob takes the box to mean that Helen, despite knowing how to do basic maintenance, hides this fact in order to continue to keep Teddy around. He promises to keep Helen's secret.

The episode ends as the family is leaving the next morning, as well as Teddy. Linda tells Helen to drop by their restaurant anytime with Teddy, and they drive off. In the last shot, the family faces the camera, and through the back window, the camera shows Helen with a serious expression on her face as dramatic music plays.

== Reception ==
Caroline Framke of The A.V. Club gave the episode an A−, saying, "Housetrap" is a solid episode that manages to balance some more surreal material with grounded punchlines. This is especially noteworthy if only because it's a destination episode that takes place entirely outside the restaurant, which has either made for some of the strongest episodes or the most uncontrollably zany ones." The episode received a 1.2 rating and was watched by a total of 2.47 million people. This made it the fourth most watched show on Fox that night, behind Brooklyn Nine-Nine, Family Guy and The Simpsons.

Dan Fybel won the Writers Guild of America Award for Outstanding Writing in Animation at the 68th Writers Guild of America Awards for his script to this episode.
