= Father of the Bob =

- Bob's Burgers episode
- Episode no.: Season 5 Episode 6
- Directed by: Chris Song
- Written by: Steven Davis; Kelvin Yu
- Production code: 4ASA18
- Original air date: December 7, 2014

Guest appearances
- Bill Hader as Big Bob; Nick Offerman as Pete; Carl Reiner as Henry; Jordan Peele as Max

Episode chronology
| ← Previous "Best Burger" | Next → "Tina Tailor Soldier Spy" |
- Bob's Burgers season 5

"Father of the Bob" is the sixth episode of the fifth season of the animated comedy series Bob's Burgers and the overall 73rd episode, and is written by Steven Davis and Kelvin Yu and directed by Chris Song. It aired on Fox in the United States on December 7, 2014.

== Plot ==
Bob's father, Big Bob, is throwing his annual Christmas party at his restaurant, Big Bob's Diner. Linda urges them all to go, though Bob and his father do not get along. Bob institutes a "15 Minute Rule", which represents his father's ability to say something offensive enough to him within 15 minutes that Bob cannot stand to be around him and must leave. Since he was a child working in Big Bob's Diner, his father has not understood nor respected his son's desire to make creative burgers. As a boy, the first time he made one (called the "Baby, You Can Chive My Car" Burger) for his father's regular, Henry, Big Bob threw it away and made Henry "the usual", a tuna melt, before Henry could have a taste.

At the party, Big Bob is cooking for his customers. The kids greet their grandfather, then head to his basement to build Bob a last minute Christmas present out of Big Bob's basement junk. Meanwhile, Linda and Bob meet Big Bob's regulars: Henry, Max, and Pete, who owns the gay bar, The Junk Yard, next door. Learning that Big Bob is short staffed that night, Linda suggests that Bob help him in the kitchen in an attempt to get them to reconcile. Bob reluctantly does so, setting the 15 minute timer. The two trade awkward small talk. 20 years earlier, Big Bob's Christmas gift to "Little Bob", then a young man, was to reveal his plan to change the diner to "Big Bob & Son's Diner" and make Little Bob his business partner in front of all his friends and customers. However, Little Bob snaps, saying that he doesn't want to work with his father because he is rigid and puts down all his creative ideas. Humiliated in front of his friends, Big Bob angrily tells Little Bob to leave, which he does, storming out and saying he will start his own restaurant with creative, interesting burgers.

Down in the basement of Big Bob's Diner, the kids' makeshift presents all fail, and with nothing else to give, they hastily wrap a snow globe with a newspaper in Big Bob's desk. Upstairs, Big Bob gruffly criticizes Bob's ability to make a simple grilled cheese just as the timer goes off. Linda then submits Henry's order: the usual. Seeing this as his chance to prove himself, Bob announces that he'll make Henry exactly the same burger he never got to try 20 years ago and that Henry can decide which of their food tastes better. The two men race to make their food and despite Big Bob's pleas, Henry ultimately gives in and eats Bob's burger, announcing how irresistibly delicious it is. Bob triumphantly gloats and Big Bob, humiliated once again, sadly tells Bob he won and leaves. Bob is immediately ashamed and when the kids give him their present, he sees that the newspaper has the first review of Bob's Burgers ever written. Realizing that his father saved it all these years, he goes with Pete next door to The Junk Yard, where Big Bob is sulking.

The bar is having its Country Line Dance Night, and Bob is surprised to learn that his father has since taken up line dancing. The two talk it over during the line dance, with Bob expressing his frustrations, but recognizing that his father always loved him and even secretly supported him, and that it was wrong of him to embarrass him in front of his friends tonight and 20 years ago, even if he isn't sorry that he struck out on his own. His father admits that he understands why he had to leave and knows he is hard to work with, saying that things were hard after Bob's mother was no longer around. The two later stand outside the diner and see Linda and the kids running the restaurant in their absence. Big Bob tells Bob that he has a great family, happy kids, and is a good father, and the two rejoin the party to the customers' cheers. Big Bob wishes everyone a Merry Christmas.

== Reception ==
Alasdair Wilkins of The A.V. Club gave the episode a B+, stating that "'Father Of The Bob' then is a good example of why a show doesn't need to be surprising to be successful. It's entirely possible for an episode to be predictable and still good just as long as the episode finds satisfying ways to give us what we expect." Robert Ham of Paste gave the episode a 9.2 out of 10, stating, "No show does heartwarming quite like Bob's Burgers. Even when they're hitting on the well-worn holiday themes of forgiveness and family togetherness, they balance that out with hilarious bits of weirdness..."

The episode received a 1.6 rating and was watched by a total of 3.18 million people. This made it the fourth most watched show on Fox that night, behind Brooklyn Nine-Nine, Family Guy, and The Simpsons.
