= Tina Tailor Soldier Spy =

- Bob's Burgers episode
- Episode no.: Season 5 Episode 7
- Directed by: Don MacKinnon
- Written by: Holly Schlesinger
- Production code: 4ASA15
- Original air date: December 14, 2014

Guest appearances
- Brooke Dillman as Ginny; Rachel Dratch as Jodi; Sarah Baker as Rena; Melissa Galsky as Julie; Betsy Sodaro as Patty

Episode chronology
← Previous "Father of the Bob"	Next → "Midday Run"
- Bob's Burgers season 5

"Tina Tailor Soldier Spy" is the seventh episode of the fifth season of the animated comedy series Bob's Burgers and the overall 74th episode, and is written by Holly Schlesinger and directed by Don MacKinnon. It aired on Fox in the United States on December 14, 2014.

== Plot ==
Tina decides to quit her Thundergirls troop, Troop 119, after feeling that her troop does not care for her adherence to the older Thundergirl manual. However, her former troop leader, Ginny, recruits her to return to the troop as a spy. She needs Tina to help her figure out which girl in the troop is a mole for their rivals, Troop 257. Every year, Troop 119's Thundergirl cookie sales are terrible and Ginny has learned that it is due to someone giving Troop 257 all of their planned cookie sale locations ahead of time. She is certain now, because she told Troop 119 that her new workplace would be perfect, only to have Troop 257 appear and sell all her coworkers cookies before Troop 119 was able to arrive. Ginny spoke to all the girls in the troop—Katie, Julie, Rena, Jodi, and Molly—and cannot determine which one is the mole; she knows it cannot be Tina, because Tina quit before the sabotage at her workplace happened. Tina agrees to help her.

Louise learns about Tina's mission and tells Tina she will need her help if she wants to solve the case. When Tina refuses, Louise surprises her by joining Troop 119. Louise dubs her and Tina the "Mole Patrol". Tina's plan is to gain the mole's trust slowly and carefully, but Louise thinks a better idea would be to spread rumors to turn the girls against one another until the mole is revealed. Louise's plan sends the troop into chaos and when she threatens Jodi for a confession, Tina has enough and tells Louise that Mole Patrol is over and that she should leave the troop. Louise is angered and joins Troop 257 on her own under the name "Alanis" to determine who the mole is from the other end. She finds that Troop 257 is made up of extreme and hard edged girls who use a secret handshake involving farting noises when their finger is pulled.

Meanwhile, in a subplot, Gretchen convinces Linda to dye her hair blonde. At first, Linda is enamored with her new look and aspires to play the "dumb, sexy blonde", but begins to fear that she truly is losing her intelligence because of her hair color. After seeing Gretchen dye her hair brunette, Linda changes her hair color back and feels secure that her intelligence has returned.

Being no closer to solving the mystery, Tina loses hope and concludes that perhaps her adherence to the old manual indeed makes her too dated for the Thundergirls. However, looking into her old manual, she gets an idea. Meanwhile, Louise is forced to go with Troop 257 to sell cookies at their latest lead and sees that they have arrived at Bob's Burgers. Bob and Linda inadvertently reveal Louise's identity to Troop 257 just as Troop 119 enter, as summoned by Tina. Tina reveals that she used a Thundergirl survival trapping strategy of setting multiple traps for prey: she privately told each of the girls in her troop a different cookie lead location and waited to see which location Troop 257 went to, allowing her to know which girl was the mole based on the lead she gave her. She reveals that she gave Rena the restaurant location, and that Rena is the mole. Rena counters that the mole could be Tina since she also knew the location, but Louise pulls on Rena's finger and she reflexively makes the telltale Troop 257 farting noise handshake, confirming her as the mole. Rena coldly explains that she joined Troop 257 first and was selected after her first year to infiltrate their rival Troop 119 as a mole. She and Troop 257 then leave.

Afterward, Tina states that she has decided to stay with Troop 119, and Louise is unimpressed, calling it a waste of time. Linda suggests that Louise only helped Tina and created the Mole Patrol because she wanted to spend time with her big sister and felt jealous that the Thundergirls monopolized her time. Louise reluctantly admits this to be the case. Tina invites her to join Troop 119, but Louise tells her she is not interested. Regardless, Tina gives her a friendship bracelet she made in Thundergirls and Louise quickly takes it and tells her that she will wear it forever.

== Reception ==
Alasdair Wilkins of The A.V. Club gave the episode an A−, praising the character development for Tina from an initially weird and awkward teenager into a weird, but outgoing girl. However, Wilkins also noted that the episode specifically allowed more emotional insight into Louise as a character, stating, "Yes, this is a Thundergirl espionage story, but it’s also, as the once-again dark-haired Linda recognizes at episode’s end, a sweet little story about a little sister who is jealous of the organization that monopolizes so much of her big sister’s time. Throw in that bit of business about Linda going blonde and Troop 257 being the single most evil assortment of cookie sellers ever assembled, and you’ve got a special episode on your hands." Robert Ham of Paste gave the episode an 8.2 out of 10, calling it the least funny episode of the season. However, he noted that, "What tonight’s edition lost in spit-take inducing gags and one-liners, it made up for with a nicely silly plot, and an opportunity to see Tina doing something other than rhapsodizing about boys and horses."

The episode received a 1.3 rating and was watched by a total of 2.54 million people. This made it the fourth most watched show on Fox that night, behind Brooklyn Nine-Nine, Family Guy, and The Simpsons.
