= Best Burger =

- Bob's Burgers episode
- Episode no.: Season 5 Episode 5
- Directed by: Don MacKinnon
- Written by: Mike Benner
- Production code: 4ASA12
- Original air date: November 30, 2014

Guest appearances
- Andy Daly as Ray; Thomas Lennon as Chuck; Ron Lynch as Ron; Kumail Nanjiani as Skip; Bill Hader as Mickey

Episode chronology
| ← Previous "Dawn of the Peck" | Next → "Father of the Bob" |
- Bob's Burgers season 5

"Best Burger" is the fifth episode of the fifth season of the animated comedy series Bob's Burgers and the overall 72nd episode. It was written by Mike Benner and directed by Don MacKinnon. It aired on Fox in the United States on November 30, 2014.

== Plot ==
Bob enters the first annual Best Burger competition at Wonder Wharf, hosted by Chuck Charles, where he competes against Jimmy Pesto and charismatic celebrity chef Skip Marooch. The chefs have 20 minutes to cook their burger entries before they are judged by a panel. Skip's entry is the Pomegranate Green Chili Chutney Burger, Jimmy Pesto's is the Oregano Burger, and Bob's is the Bet It All On Black Garlic Burger, which uses an expensive, specialty ingredient: Korean black garlic.

Bob is wracked with anxiety, questioning why he entered a competition he knows he will likely lose, and has to deal with constant jabs from Chuck, who still holds a grudge against him for getting him fired from his job as a morning talk show host. Things become worse when Bob realizes that the black garlic is not in their cooler. Bob entrusted Gene to pack it, but Gene became distracted and forgot it on the kitchen counter.

Bob sends Gene to retrieve it in time to prepare, but Linda sends Louise and Tina to ensure he does not mess up. At the restaurant, Gene smashes the black garlic into his shirt in a moment of distraction, rendering it unusable. They call Bob, who instructs the kids to go buy some at the specialty food store, Fig Jam, which is the only store that carries it. The kids are reluctant because an earlier argument with the store owner, Ray, resulted in him banning them.

Ray is willing to sell them the black garlic, but they cannot pay because Gene foolishly gave their money to a grifter. With no other options, Louise steals the black garlic and Ray chases them. The kids run into Mickey driving a pedicab, and jump into his coach with Ron, his passenger. As they ride to the wharf, Gene is shocked to learn from his sisters that everyone in the family views him as a screw-up, to the point that his name is a common verb for losing focus and messing up: "Gene-ing out".

Back at the competition, Bob is pessimistic about their chances of winning, but Linda points out that Bob may be subconsciously sabotaging himself by assigning the most crucial task to their least responsible child, Gene, all as a way to have an excuse for failure. Bob realizes she is right and they get a text from the kids saying they got the garlic and are on their way. The kids are being chased by Ray in a pedicab behind them. Gene elects to make the final run to bring the garlic to Bob, despite knowing that Wonder Wharf is full of distractions, feeling that he must prove himself as reliable.

Ron, Louise, and Tina stall Ray, ultimately getting rid of him by pointing out that Fig Jam is unstaffed with him gone and a likely target for looters. Gene runs through Wonder Wharf, and despite encountering numerous delicious food attractions, manages to reach Bob. As Gene attempts to apologize for being a screw-up, Bob grabs the black garlic and finishes his burgers in the nick of time. His burger is excellently reviewed by the judges, but Skip's burger ultimately wins.

Walking home, Bob decides he is proud of what they all accomplished even though he lost, and tells Gene that despite sometimes getting distracted, he loves Gene for who he is and appreciates how hard he worked today. The family arrives to find a line of eager customers at their restaurant, including Skip, who all want to try Bob's black garlic burger. Bob asks Gene if he wants to help him fire up the grill, but Gene decides to take the day off and finally enjoy the Wonder Wharf food spectacles.

== Reception ==
Alasdair Wilkins of The A.V. Club gave the episode a B+, stating that the show could face difficulty creating a good story for Gene, and managed to do so quite well: "Bob’s Burgers has long struggled to know quite what to do with Gene as a character—he’s an asset as a ready source of one-liners and farts, but that isn’t quite the same thing as emotional depth—but “Best Burger” unexpectedly pulls out one hell of a story for the Belcher boy, as he faces up to just how much of a colossal screw-up he is and strives to get things right, just this once...Gene and Bob’s story strikes just the right balance between being funny and being poignant; about the worst you can say about it is that 'Best Burger' takes a little while to wind its way to that specific story." Robert Ham of Paste gave the episode a 9.1 out of 10, praising the episode delivering a true victory for The Belchers, compared to the half-victories they usually encounter: "Bob doesn’t win the titular contest for Best Burger, but what does come out of his efforts is a little bit of personal growth and a way to express his affection for his strange and easily distracted son Gene."

The episode received a 1.0 rating and was watched by a total of 2.23 million people. This made it the fourth most watched show on Fox that night, losing to Brooklyn Nine-Nine, Family Guy, and The Simpsons.
