= The Runway Club =

- Bob's Burgers episode
- Episode no.: Season 5 Episode 16
- Directed by: Jennifer Coyle
- Written by: Steven Davis; Kelvin Yu
- Production code: 5ASA04
- Original air date: March 22, 2015

Guest appearances
- Brooke Dillman as Trish; David Herman as Mr. Frond; Jay Johnston as Jimmy Pesto; Sarah Silverman as Ms. Schnur; Jenny Slate as Tammy and Sally; Bobby Tisdale as Zeke

Episode chronology
← Previous "Adventures in Chinchilla-sitting"	Next → "Itty Bitty Ditty Committee"
- Bob's Burgers season 5

"The Runway Club" is the 16th episode of the fifth season of the animated comedy series Bob's Burgers and the overall 83rd episode, and is written by Steven Davis and Kelvin Yu and directed by Jennifer Coyle. It aired on Fox in the United States on March 22, 2015.

== Plot ==
Tina, Gene, and Louise arrive at school for a Saturday detention session, upset that they were missing out on the Cotton Candy festival which would be over by the time the detention ended. Jimmy Jr., Tammy, Jocelyn, and Zeke were also at detention. A flashback revealed the punishments were handed out after Tina and Tammy wore the same sparkly jelly bracelet to school and caused an argument and a fight where the younger Belcher kids tried to pull them apart, Zeke jumped into the fight for fun, Jocelyn pulled the fire alarm to try and call for help, and Jimmy Jr. sprayed the fire extinguisher over everyone trying to make a "foam party".

While serving their detention, Mr. Frond decided to hold a fashion contest (since fashion was responsible for the melee) à la Project Runway called Scared Fabulous. The students are reluctant to participate until he told them that the winners could leave detention 3 hours early. The three teams were Tammy and Jocelyn, Zeke and Jimmy Jr, and the three Belcher children. Tammy and Tina make a side bet where the winner gets to keep wearing their sparkly jelly bracelet and the loser had to throw their bracelet away. There were three challenges and three judges (Coach Blevins, Secretary Schnur, and Custodian Branca) who were chosen because they were the only ones in the school on Saturday.

The first challenge involved designing an outfit for Ms. Schnur to wear over a three-day weekend on the couch using materials from her supply closet (like folders, construction paper, and staples). Tammy and Jocelyn won that challenge and didn't have to compete in the second round. The second challenge involved designing an outfit for Coach Blevins that's good for three different activities using wrestling mats and old jerseys. The coach didn't know much about fashion and after being told he couldn't call it a tie, he had the team's models (Zeke and Gene) wrestle to determine the winner.

During the wrestling match, Principal Spoors just called Mr. Frond, to say he despised the idea of Scared Fabulous which put an end to the contest. Mr. Frond told the kids to go back to class and finish their detention, clearly disappointed, seeing himself as exceptionally experienced with fashion. The kids protested and Louise challenged Mr. Frond to compete against all of them. If Mr. Frond wins, the kids would all talk up the Scared Fabulous fashion program to the principal. But if the kids win, they all get to leave early. The final challenge was judged by Mr. Branca who wanted something fit for a presidential speech made out of trash.

Despite arguing and fighting, Tina and Tammy gave up their jelly bracelets (though Tammy needed a bit more "persuading") to help finish their team's outfit, earning them the victory over Mr. Frond. Though initially upset, Mr. Frond noticed the jelly bracelets and took it as a sign they set aside their differences and were rehabilitated thanks to his fashion program. After the kids leave, Principal Spoors made a surprise visit, forcing Mr. Frond to set off the fire alarm as a distraction.

Meanwhile, Bob and Linda were visited by a neighborhood girl named Sally who was offering magazine subscriptions as part of a fundraiser. Bob suspected someone was scamming Sally, and that no magazines would be delivered after receiving the money. They told Sally she was part of a scam fundraiser and she left, flustered, but soon returned with Trish, the angry head of the fundraiser. Trish pressured/threatened them into buying 20 magazines by nearly ripping up their serving counter. Jimmy Pesto stopped by to jeer at Bob but Bob managed to use reverse psychology to trick Jimmy Pesto into ordering and paying for 40 magazines, which had Bob and Linda overall pleased (they may have gotten scammed but Jimmy Pesto got scammed twice as hard).

== Reception ==
Alasdair Wilkins of The A.V. Club gave the episode an A.

The episode received a 1.0 rating and was watched by a total of 2.21 million people. This made it the fourth most watched show on Fox that night, behind The Simpsons, Family Guy, and The Last Man on Earth.
