= Fort Night =

- Bob's Burgers episode
- Episode no.: Season 4 Episode 2
- Directed by: Boohwan Lim; Kyounghee Lim
- Written by: Mike Olsen
- Production code: 3ASA13
- Original air date: October 6, 2013

Guest appearances
- Aziz Ansari as Darryl; Andy Kindler as Mort; Sam Seder as Harold; Molly Shannon as Millie Frock; Laura Silverman as Andy; Sarah Silverman as Ollie

Episode chronology
| ← Previous "A River Runs Through Bob" | Next → "Seaplane!" |
- Bob's Burgers season 4

"Fort Night" is the second episode of the fourth season of the American animated comedy series Bob's Burgers. The episode, written by Mike Olsen, is the series' second Halloween special, and features guest appearances from comedians Aziz Ansari and Molly Shannon. Its plot centers around the Belcher siblings – Tina (Dan Mintz), Gene (Eugene Mirman), and Louise (Kristen Schaal) – getting trapped in their makeshift fort on Halloween with their friends Darryl (Ansari), Andy (Laura Silverman), and Ollie (Sarah Silverman), all the while being tormented by Millie (Shannon), a psychotic classmate of Louise's who refuses to send any help. The children must try to escape the fort before trick-or-treating commences at night.

"Fort Night" originally aired on October 6, 2013 on Fox and drew an audience of 4.21 million viewers. After its airing, the series took a month-long hiatus to make way for the network's Major League Baseball coverage. The episode received positive reviews from critics, who were complimentary towards its main plot.

== Plot ==
For Halloween, Tina, Gene, and Louise plan to team up with Andy and Ollie Pesto and collectively wear a Chinese dragon costume, which they have gotten Bob and Linda to construct, in a ploy to get twice the usual amount of candy. Tina plans not to go trick-or-treating again, believing that as a teen she has outgrown the activity. Before they go back to the family restaurant to claim their costume, the five, accompanied by their friend Darryl, decide to make a stopover at the Belcher siblings' makeshift cardboard fort, located in a neighboring alley, so Gene can grab the dragon eyes. However, a truck backs up and blocks the fort's entrance and roof, with the driver unaware that the children are inside. Once they realize that he will be leaving the truck parked in the alley for the night, they begin to scream for help. Only Millie Frock, a psychotic classmate of Louise's, overhears them and comes to their rescue. Louise, however, becomes increasingly annoyed by Millie's talkativeness and eventually lashes out at her, causing Millie to keep them stuck in the fort. As the day continues, Millie continues to torment her trapped schoolmates, first by dropping plastic spiders through the fort's walls. Louise rips through some soggy cardboard, which reveals a passageway into an adjacent dumpster. Ollie is sent through first, but Millie closes the dumpster on him before he can escape and get help. It emerges that Darryl told Millie of their escape plan in exchange for candy and a trip to the bathroom, only for her to betray him. Night falls and Bob and Linda, noticing that their kids have not yet arrived to pick up their costume, decide to investigate the fort. Millie, however, deceives them into believing that the children have already gone trick-or-treating.

Darryl discovers that he can use a bent wire hanger to press a button on the truck which will lift up its loading ramp off the roof, allowing them to escape. However, he presses the wrong button, which causes the ramp to instead move downward onto the fort. They stack up bricks and paint cans from the dumpster to stop themselves from being crushed to death and the force begins to tear the fort's doors, allowing the kids to crawl free. However, they are disappointed to find that the lights have been turned off in every house.

Tina, Gene, and Louise go home and decide to eat the candy obtained by Bob and Linda, who went trick-or-treating in the dragon costume. Tina says that she will continue to trick-or-treat after all. Millie later passes by the alley with plans to taunt everyone by eating her candy haul where they can hear her, but sees the pesto twin's abandoned shoes amidst the crushed remains of the fort and panics believing that she has killed her schoolmates. The Belcher siblings, hiding in the truck, pretend to be enraged spirits and trick Millie into forfeiting her candy and running off screaming. As the credits roll, Tina, Gene, Louise, Andy, Ollie, and Darryl are seen happily eating Millie's candy.

== Production ==
"Fort Night" was written by Mike Olsen and directed by Boohwan and Kyounghee Lim. In an interview with Rolling Stone, Bob's Burgers creator Loren Bouchard cited "Fort Night" as one of his favorite episodes of the series, stating: "I love that they're trapped in a cardboard box for the entire episode. It was a high-concept, what I call a 'submarine' episode, but it didn't feel claustrophobic in a bad way. We didn't do an actual bottle episode, but it's fun to try to do our take on that." Bouchard revealed that the fort's design, which features multiple rooms, floors and decor, was inspired by film director Wes Anderson's work. Darryl's costume is based on the trademark outfits of American rock band Devo.

Comedian Aziz Ansari guest stars in the episode, reprising his role as Darryl, a video game enthusiast and friend of the Belcher children. "Fort Night" also introduces the character Millie Frock, a psychotic classmate of Louise's, guest voiced by comedian Molly Shannon. Shannon's and Ansari's guest appearances were first revealed by Fox in September 2013. An official poster for the episode was designed and later posted on the official Bob's Burgers writers' blog on October 8.

== Reception ==
"Fort Night" first aired in the United States on October 6, 2013 on Fox, as a part of the Animation Domination programming block. The episode was watched by 4.21 million viewers and received a 1.9/5 Nielsen rating in the 18–49 demographic, becoming the fourth most-watched program of the Animation Domination block for the night. Its ratings marked a minor decrease over the previous week's season premiere, "A River Runs Through Bob", which attained 4.48 million viewers. "Fort Night" was the final episode of Bob's Burgers to air before a temporary month-long hiatus, during which Fox's coverage of Major League Baseball took over its time slot. The series resumed on November 3 with the episode "Seaplane!"

Alasdair Wilkins of The A.V. Club assigned "Fort Night" an A grade, writing that the episode "admirably pushes the boundaries of what a Bob's Burgers episode can be, but the fact that it has far more to offer than mere shock value is what makes it a classic." Wilkins stated that the episode's venture into psychological horror was an ideal fit for the series, as Louise "already displays more than her fair share of possibly psychotic tendencies", and noted what he felt was the episode's "clever trick" of "introducing Millie, who displays all of Louise's craziest traits without even the vague sense of right and wrong that keeps Louise at least loosely tethered to sanity."

Robert Ham of Paste gave the episode an 8.8 out of 10, comparing it to "A River Runs Through Bob" in the sense that "there's no big lesson learned, and no heartfelt moment of family togetherness." He stated that the "fun of this episode lies in watching the kids struggle with their fate", praising the elements of suspense in the main plot, though writing that "Bob and Linda, unfortunately, get stuck in the background of this story."
