= Can't Buy Me Math =

- Bob's Burgers episode
- Episode no.: Season 5 Episode 11
- Directed by: Tyree Dillihay
- Written by: Dan Fybel
- Production code: 4ASA22
- Original air date: February 8, 2015

Guest appearances
- Aziz Ansari as Darryl; Bobby Tisdale as Zeke; Kurt Braunohler as DJ; Jenny Slate as Tammy and Rosa

Episode chronology
← Previous "Late Afternoon in the Garden of Bob and Louise"	Next → "The Millie-churian Candidate"
- Bob's Burgers season 5

"Can't Buy Me Math" is the 11th episode of the fifth season of the animated comedy series Bob's Burgers and the overall 78th episode. It was written by Dan Fybel and directed by Tyree Dillihay. It aired on Fox in the United States on February 8, 2015.

== Plot ==
Darryl approaches Tina to be his fake girlfriend in exchange for tutoring her in her classes so she won't fail and be sent to remedial math. Tina is reluctant until Darryl explains that by being each other's fake partners, they can attract the attention of their unrequited love interests: Jimmy Jr. for Tina, and Rosa, an upperclassman whose skills in video games rival Darryl's own. Tina teams up with Darryl to win the Cupid's Couple contest at the school dance so that each of them will become popular enough to attract the attention of Jimmy Jr. and Rosa. The two publicly promote each other as perfect and desirable partners, and then stage a dramatic, public breakup.

The ploy is successful and Darryl begins dating a sympathetic Rosa while Tina has attracted the interest of Jimmy Jr. However, Tina finds that she has developed feelings for Darryl due to his exemplary staged acts of love, despite knowing they were fake. While they all go on a group date, Tina loses her composure watching Rosa and Darryl flirt and publicly exposes their ruse in an attempt to win Darryl back. Rosa is disgusted and breaks up with Darryl, and Tina immediately regrets what she has done. She speaks with Rosa and tells her that Darryl put on the ruse because he felt he was out of Rosa's league, but genuinely liked her. Rosa is unsure, but relents when she and Darryl bond over an arcade game. Dejected, and having failed math anyway, Tina arrives at remedial math class, but finds that Jimmy Jr. is also in the class and sits next to him.

Meanwhile, Linda plans a week of Valentine's Day activities for herself and Bob. Her goal is to take the pressure off of a large celebration on Valentine's Day by having them celebrate small romantic gestures during the entire week. However, each of her plans go awry, culminating in Bob doing a disastrous striptease without realizing that he is visible to the entire street. When the residents of the neighborhood heckle him, he decides to continue anyway to make Linda happy.

== Reception ==
Alasdair Wilkins of The A.V. Club gave the episode an A−, saying, "'Can’t Buy Me Math' is a classic Bob’s Burgers episode, one in which I don’t even need to mention Bob’s climactic striptease to get across its general brilliance. But still: Bob’s striptease! Once again, chaos reigns over the show, as the admittedly limited sexiness of Bob’s dancing is enough to revolt the patrons at Jimmy Pesto’s and the assorted passersby (which of course includes Edith). That scene nails down the general brilliance of the Bob’s Burgers approach, as the situation once again spirals out of control, to the point that even a simple act as closing the curtains feels like a cosmic impossibility."

Robert Ham of Paste gave the episode a 9.0 out of 10, saying "If you watch nothing else from this episode, I would recommend seeking out the final scenes where Bob attempts to do a striptease for his wife. It’s the perfect mix of over-the-top silliness, with Bob’s inability to do anything more but swivel his hips around, embarrassment due to the curtains getting stuck open, and some genuine affection between the couple. There’s something to be said about how willing Bob was to do this for his wife. His enthusiasm was definitely something to be admired, as was his choice of AC/DC’s “The Jack” for his stripper song."

The episode received a 1.0 rating and was watched by a total of 1.94 million people. This made it the fourth most watched show on Fox that night, behind Brooklyn Nine-Nine, The Simpsons and Family Guy, but ahead of Mulaney.
