= The Millie-churian Candidate =

- Bob's Burgers episode
- Episode no.: Season 5 Episode 12
- Directed by: Don MacKinnon
- Written by: Greg Thompson
- Production code: 4ASA21
- Original air date: February 15, 2015

Guest appearance
- Molly Shannon as Millie

Episode chronology
← Previous "Can't Buy Me Math"	Next → "The Gayle Tales"
- Bob's Burgers season 5

"The Millie-churian Candidate" is the 12th episode of the fifth season of the animated comedy series Bob's Burgers and the overall 79th episode, and is written by Greg Thompson and directed by Don MacKinnon. It aired on Fox in the United States on February 15, 2015.

== Plot ==
At Wagstaff elementary Tina tries to convince Louise and Gene to help her in Jimmy Jr.'s run for student body president. Louise mocks the process and refuses to help but Jimmy Jr. is unconcerned as his polling numbers show he has a 95-point lead over the only other candidate, Henry Haber. In the cafeteria, Henry hands a campaign flyer to Millie who promptly crumples it. He explains that though Jimmy Jr. wants to be everyone's friend, Henry wants to be president so he can have power over people to help them. Struck with the idea of power Millie decides to run for president so she can control Louise.

Initially mocking the idea of Millie running, Louise becomes concerned when she has a nightmare where Millie wins the election and forces Louise to be her friend. Louise decides to run Jimmy Jr.'s campaign to ensure he wins over Millie. Louise creates a pro-Jimmy Jr. ad which the students find lame. She then changes tactics and creates an attack ad on Millie which backfires by making Millie sympathetic. Deciding that a negative attack ad will create sympathy for Jimmy Jr., Louise films one attacking Jimmy Jr, which causes him to slide even further in the polls. Jimmy Jr. decides to quit his campaign as Millie has offered to let him pick the songs for school dances which was his sole reason for running in the first place. Unwilling to let Millie win, Louise decides to run for office herself. She fails horribly at gaining traction for her campaign and during a debate Louise is horrified to learn Millie plans to institute an alphabetical "besties system", making it so Louise and Millie would be paired up as besties.

The day of the election Louise receives an anonymous note that encourages her to look in Abby's permanent record file. Louise forces Gene and Tina to help her break into Mr. Frond's office. They are caught by Mr. Frond, but only after Louise has already located what's inside Abby's permanent record. Louise escapes to the gym, where voting is going on, and reveals that Abby's real first name is Mabel and that, since her name comes before Millie's she will be Louise's bestie. Enraged, Millie tells Louise that they will becomes besties no matter what even if she has to take out Abby and briefly chokes Abby with her own braid. Mr. Frond disqualifies both Millie and Louise in the race and then announces since there are no more candidates, there will be no president. Henry reminds Mr. Frond that he is still in the race and thus becomes the de facto president. Louise tells Henry that he is lucky to have won but Henry reveals that he orchestrated both Jimmy Jr.'s downfall and was the one who sent the tip off to Louise ensuring that she would take out Millie and be disqualified herself. Louise is shocked but ultimately congratulates Henry believing he will be an amazing president.

Meanwhile, Bob buys a handcrafted $300 Japanese knife and obsesses over how well it performs. Teddy brings in his own favorite hammer to compare, and the two quickly argue over which tool is better. Linda settles the argument by having them do an "Olympics" style competition. The first round (pounding 10 nails vs slicing 10 tomatoes) ends in a tie, and so do the subsequent four rounds. The competition is settled by pitting the tools against each other and see which one causes the most damage. Bob tries to stab the hammer but doesn't make so much as a dent, and Teddy hammers the knife until it's crumpled and unusable. Though Bob is upset, he's impressed by Teddy's hammer and wishes to get one himself.

== Reception ==
Alasdair Wilkins of The A.V. Club gave the episode a B+, saying, "There’s some wonderfully insightful character work on display in “The Millie-churian Candidate,” so perhaps it's not such a bad thing that the episode closes by so proudly tipping its own cap. The reveal that Henry Haber engineered all this allows the episode to underline the point it's already made about Louise and Millie, and I'll admit I didn't find the reveal of Henry's own Machiavellian brilliance quite amusing enough to justify the huge amount of exposition needed to get us there."

The episode received a 0.9 rating and was watched by a total of 2.01 million people. This made it the fourth most watched show on Fox that night, behind Brooklyn Nine-Nine, The Simpsons and Family Guy, but ahead of Mulaney.
