= Eat, Spray, Linda =

- Bob's Burgers episode
- Episode no.: Season 5 Episode 18
- Directed by: Tyree Dillihay
- Written by: Jon Schroeder
- Production code: 5ASA06
- Original air date: May 3, 2015

Guest appearances
- Drew Droege as Deidre; Todd Barry as Checker; Seth Morris as Baker; Jordan Peele as Hotel Security Guard

Episode chronology
← Previous "Itty Bitty Ditty Committee"	Next → "Housetrap"
- Bob's Burgers season 5

"Eat, Spray, Linda" is the 18th episode of the fifth season of the animated comedy series Bob's Burgers and the overall 85th episode, and is written by Jon Schroeder and directed by Tyree Dillihay. It aired on Fox in the United States on May 3, 2015.

== Plot ==
It's Linda's birthday, and Bob needs more time to plan her birthday surprise. As Linda grows more impatient with how long it's taking Bob and the kids to put together her surprise, she volunteers to go to the store for groceries. On her way to buy groceries, she runs across the "Chalk of the Town" Chalk Festival, and once at the grocery store, she finds herself cut in line and then stuck behind a woman who proceeds to take forever with purchasing cups for "Chalk of the Town". Already despondent over her birthday and the many irritations she has had to endure, Linda returns to her car only to find it stuck between two larger vehicles. Having little room for maneuvering, she makes her way to the car door, opens it up enough to get her purse and keys in it, and unfortunately splits her pants trying to get into the car. Her pants splitting causes her to move forward in surprise, closing the car door behind her with the both her cell phone and keys inside.

The grocery store won't allow Linda to make a call to Bob to tell him what has happened. Putting a plastic grocery bag over her pants to cover up the split, Linda decides to try and take the bus back to Wonder Wharf, but gets on the wrong bus and has to get off to walk back. Meanwhile, Bob and the kids realize that Linda hasn't returned yet, and decide to call Teddy to drive them to the store to go look for her. Not finding her at the store, Gene suggests a bakery that he and Linda go to frequently as a place to look for her. They go to the bakery, but Bob finds that Linda was banned for taking too many free samples. Tina then suggests that they go to the Royal Oyster Hotel where Linda enjoys going to the bathroom. Although Linda is not at the hotel, Bob does find out that Linda has been coming to the hotel for years to go to the bathroom and that the staff all like her. Running out of places to look, Louise suggests a local pet shop where she and Linda enjoy cuddling with the puppies. Realizing that Linda doesn't have her keys to get back into the apartment, Bob and the kids head home to see if she has made her way back.

As this is going on, Linda gets sprayed by a skunk twice while walking back home, breaks her glasses, and is forced to hitchhike and eventually get in a horse trailer to make her way back. She finds her way blocked by the "Chalk of the Town" festival and quickly gets into an argument with the woman who previously held her up at the grocery store. Without a ticket to get in, Linda decides to run through the festival of sidewalk chalk displays, all the while pursued by the woman who is wrecking the displays right and left. Linda finally loses the woman when she leaps over a display crafted to look like a chasm and the woman refuses to jump. Linda arrives back at the apartment, and breaks in when she can't get in any other way.

Linda finds out that Bob and the kids have prepared a homemade "spa day" at the apartment for her. Bob tells Linda that he learned a lot about her today and that he's happy to find that he is still finding out new things about his wife after being married all these years. Bob tells her he's sorry her birthday was terrible, but Linda replies that it was the best birthday ever, showing her that she still has spunk even while getting older. Linda even says she wants this to be a new tradition on her birthday: every year on her birthday Bob and the kids would have to blindfold her and drop her somewhere with no cellphone or money and she would find a way home herself.

== Reception ==
Genevieve Valentine of The A.V. Club gave the episode a B, saying, "Being structured so similarly to previous episodes offers a lot of opportunity for character continuity, but it also means that this isn’t an episode that’s going to deliver a lot of unexpected beats. It’s a heartwarmer, and that’s all it wants to be. Even Linda’s thrilled with how things turn out: she “kicked this day’s butt,” getting back the confidence we never really figured she'd lost, and ends up a hero to her kids (the survivalist streak rings Louise's bells, and her encounter with horses is exciting enough it might qualify as a birthday present to Tina all by itself). It's one of those episodes that shows the warm, gooey family center of Bob’s Burgers, focusing on relationships and even letting the Belchers score a win or two—or six, depending on how happy we are for Gene getting a go at all that pumpernickel."

The episode received a 1.0 rating and was watched by a total of 2.24 million people. This made it the fifth most watched show on Fox that night, behind Brooklyn Nine-Nine, The Simpsons, The Last Man on Earth and Family Guy.
