= Dawn of the Peck =

- Bob's Burgers episode
- Episode no.: Season 5 Episode 4
- Directed by: Tyree Dillihay
- Written by: Lizzie Molyneux; Wendy Molyneux
- Production code: 4ASA16
- Original air date: November 23, 2014

Guest appearances
- Kevin Kline as Calvin Fischoeder; Zach Galifianakis as Felix Fischoeder; Bill Hader as Mickey; Laura Silverman as Andy; Sarah Silverman as Ollie; Pamela Adlon as Olsen Benner; Brian Huskey as Regular Sized Rudy; Brendon Small as Animal Control Guy

Episode chronology
| ← Previous "Friends with Burger-fits" | Next → "Best Burger" |
- Bob's Burgers season 5

"Dawn of the Peck" is the fourth episode of the fifth season of the animated comedy series Bob's Burgers and the overall 71st episode. It was written by Lizzie and Wendy Molyneux and directed by Tyree Dillihay. It aired on Fox in the United States on November 23, 2014.

== Plot ==
While the Wharf is preparing for the town festival, a carny accidentally gets his hand stuck with the caged birds meant for the festival, causing the birds to start biting on it, which results in the carny losing a few fingers.

Linda and the kids decide that they would prefer to spend Thanksgiving at the Wonder Wharf pier for the first annual "Turk-tacular Turkey Town Festival," leaving Bob hurt and spitefully swearing off Thanksgiving completely this year, despite it being his favorite holiday. Linda plans to attend the festival's "Turkey Trot," a marathon where the runners run alongside turkeys, à la the Running of the Bulls. Teddy joins her for the run while the Belcher siblings ride the spinning teacups ride along with the Pesto twins and Regular Size Rudy, overseen by Wonder Wharf staff member, Mickey. The festival is sponsored by Calvin Fischoeder and his brother Felix, who has incompetently failed to get enough turkeys for the run, and substituted by mixing the turkeys with an assortment of other farm animal birds.

At the start of the race, the turkeys, geese, ducks, and chickens are released, but they are unnaturally aggressive and begin attacking the runners and anyone nearby. They soon overrun the Wonder Wharf as Calvin and Felix quickly leave, and Linda is knocked unconscious by a one-eyed turkey dubbed "Cyclops." She wakes up inside the Wonder Wharf's Fun House with Teddy, who dragged her to safety. He explains that as a boy, he spent a summer on a turkey farm and learned a lot about them. The birds' aggressiveness is due to their pecking order being thrown into chaos after being mixed together with different bird species and humans. He explains that normally, a head bird would establish dominance by pecking the others, but without a clear pecking order, they are running amok and pecking everything around them. Linda realizes that her kids are still riding the rides and she and Teddy encounter Mickey, who admits that he left her kids and their friends on the still-running teacup ride and fled after being attacked by birds. The three of them go to rescue the kids. Calvin and Felix discuss the disaster outside Wonder Wharf but are caught arguing during a news broadcast, exposing the disaster as their fault.

Meanwhile, Bob, unaware of the chaos, stays in the apartment singing and dancing along to an old Donna Summer CD and getting drunk. He rationalizes that skipping Thanksgiving is great, but succumbs to his desire to cook Thanksgiving dinner upon seeing his favorite turkey baster in the drawer. He leaves Linda a note and drunkenly and hastily runs to the grocery store, unaware of the danger around him. Linda, Teddy, and Mickey find the five kids still trapped on the teacups with Andy, Ollie, and Rudy and try to shut the ride down using its fail-safe. They succeed after several tries and return to the apartment with everyone to seek shelter. Linda finds Bob's note and they hurry to the store. They find Bob being attacked by Cyclops and the group is quickly surrounded by the birds. Recalling Teddy's words, Linda realizes that she can establish dominance and "pecks" everyone in the group with head butts, then pecks Cyclops, who starts a pecking order among the other birds. The order is restored, and they fall in line, viewing Linda as the alpha "turkey" and the group is able to safely leave. Back at the Belcher residence, the entire family sits down to enjoy Bob's dinner along with Teddy, Mickey, and Rudy as their guests, but lose their appetites upon seeing the cooked turkey; meanwhile, at the Fischoeder residence, Calvin and Felix enjoy dinner before being attacked by turkeys crashing through their window.

== Reception ==
Alasdair Wilkins of The A.V. Club gave the episode an A−, stating that the outlandish plot requiring hundreds of aggressive turkeys interacting with the main characters was well-served by the animated nature of the show, commenting that such a feat would be difficult if not impossible to achieve on a live-action show. He called the episode a "triumph" and likewise praised the guest starring returns of Kline, Galifianakis, and Hader in a single episode. Robert Ham of Paste gave the episode an 8.5 out of 10, praising the homage to Alfred Hitchcock's The Birds and the use of Donna Summer's "Dim All the Lights" for the soundtrack to key scenes: "Just as The Simpsons have cornered the market on Halloween-themed episodes with their annual "Treehouse of Horror," so too has Bob’s Burgers become the most reliable source for Thanksgiving-themed hilarity. And this year, writers Wendy and Lizzie Molyneux have upped the ante by adding a Hitchcock-style bird attack, and one of the best uses of Donna Summer’s music to soundtrack a scene."

The episode received a .9 rating and was watched by a total of 1.9 million people. This made it the fifth most watched show on Fox that night, losing to Brooklyn Nine-Nine, Family Guy, and The Simpsons.
