= L'il Hard Dad =

- Bob's Burgers episode
- Episode no.: Season 5 Episode 14
- Directed by: Chris Song
- Written by: Nora Smith
- Production code: 5ASA02
- Original air date: March 8, 2015

Guest appearances
- Brian Huskey as Terry; Dana Snyder as Sheldon

Episode chronology
← Previous "The Gayle Tales"	Next → "Adventures in Chinchilla-sitting"
- Bob's Burgers season 5

"L'il Hard Dad" is the 14th episode of the fifth season of the animated comedy series Bob's Burgers and the overall 81st episode, and is written by Nora Smith and directed by Chris Song. It aired on Fox in the United States on March 8, 2015.

== Plot ==
Bob buys a model of the helicopter from the movie True Lies and test-flies it in the alley behind the restaurant. Upon landing, however, the helicopter instantly falls apart. Bob calls the person from whom he bought the helicopter, a man named Sheldon Felds. Upon finding that Sheldon doesn't do refunds for “crash landings,” Bob takes it upon himself to ask for a refund in person. Gene, who had been previously horrified by his own inaction when Tina was about to get hit by a pair of falling shoes, goes with his father to prove to himself he has the ability to take action in bad situations.

Bob arrives at Sheldon's apartment and is again refused to be given a refund. When Bob refuses to leave, Sheldon attacks him with a drone outfitted with a long metal rod for poking. Bob and Gene “regroup” in a dumpster and return to find Sheldon waiting for them with several fish-shaped drones, which shoot B.B. pellets at Bob.

Bob, still insistent on fighting Sheldon, goes to local hobby shop The Hobby Hole to buy a new helicopter with which to combat Sheldon's machines. He meets an employee named Terry, who informs him Sheldon used to work at the Hobby Hole before he was fired for stealing food from out of the fridge in the break room that didn't belong to him and for attacking his co-workers with helicopters – including Terry, who still has a BB pellet lodged in his knee. Terry initially warns Bob not to go up against Sheldon but, realizing he can make a buck off Bob, sells him a $300 “Vanquisher” helicopter.

Bob arrives at Sheldon's apartment, climbs onto a roof across the street, and declares an air battle. Sheldon responds by sending out a “Vanquisher-er", a Vanquisher customized to destroy other Vanquishers. Bob loses his balance on the roof and is trapped hanging off a ledge, from where Sheldon shoots Bob's posterior full of darts. Terry and two other Hobby Hole employees arrive with their own combat copters and take on Sheldon. The intense air battle rages as Bob hangs off the building in pain. Realizing the futility and ridiculousness of the situation, Gene encourages everyone to “let it the freak go.” The Hobby Hole employees and Sheldon make amends, and Bob and Gene return home.

Meanwhile, Tina must do a report on The Call Of The Wild but is struggling to get through the book. Linda admits she never did her assigned readings in school, instead using “pizzazz” to impress her teachers. Linda dresses Tina up like a dog, ties a wheelbarrow to her back in lieu of a sled, and choreographs an elaborate musical number that Tina can neither sing nor remember. When Tina does the presentation, she tears off her dog outfit and wheelbarrow in a fit of frustration. The teacher and class are both impressed, believing she embodied the “savage” themes of the book with her performance.

== Reception ==
Alasdair Wilkins of The A.V. Club gave the episode a B+, saying, "Lil’ Hard Dad" is a fine episode that keeps a particular focus on the Belcher family, with only the helicopter hobbyists and the cameos from Jocelyn and Teddy at the end distracting from the dedicated exploration of the Belchers’ own unique brand of crazy. This isn't the kind of hugely ambitious episode that redefines what Bob’s Burgers can be, but it doesn't need to be. This episode succeeds because it identifies unusual ways to combine the five core characters, and those interactions are just unfamiliar enough to add that extra zip to the gags." The episode received a 1.2 rating and was watched by a total of 2.56 million people. This made it the fifth most watched show on Fox that night, behind Brooklyn Nine-Nine, The Simpsons, Family Guy and The Last Man on Earth.
