= Midday Run =

- Bob's Burgers episode
- Episode no.: Season 5 Episode 8
- Directed by: Ian Hamilton
- Written by: Scott Jacobson
- Production code: 4ASA17
- Original air date: January 4, 2015

Guest appearances
- David Herman as Mr. Frond; Brian Huskey as Regular Sized Rudy; Sarah Silverman as Ms. Schnur; Bobby Tisdale as Zeke; Sarah Baker as Ms. Selbo

Episode chronology
← Previous "Tina Tailor Soldier Spy"	Next → "Speakeasy Rider"
- Bob's Burgers season 5

"Midday Run" is the eighth episode of the fifth season of the animated comedy series Bob's Burgers and the overall 75th episode, and is written by Scott Jacobson and directed by Ian Hamilton. It aired on Fox in the United States on January 4, 2015.

== Plot ==
Tina is up for a promotion in her hall monitoring duties to its highest rank. Regular Sized Rudy, a low ranking hall monitor, admires Tina for her stringent adherence to the rules, even writing up Gene and Louise for horsing around. Mr. Frond tasks Tina with delivering Zeke to the principal's office for his immediate suspension after breaking into the Coach Blevin's office. Rudy wants to join, but Tina tells him she will do it alone and tells him to finish his duties. Zeke begs her to let him go and tells her he did it for his grandmother, but Tina refuses to listen. He then asks if he can at least go to the bathroom and she allows him to. After some time passes, she realizes that Zeke has escaped out the bathroom window. She searches for him, unaware that Rudy has seen everything. Realizing that finding Zeke will be almost impossible when lunchtime rolls around, Tina turns to Gene and Louise for help in finding Zeke, offering them "permanent hall passes" in exchange for help in finding him. After getting help from Gene and Louise, Tina questions Jimmy Jr. about Zeke's whereabouts, who says that although he doesn't know for sure, he knows a hiding place he goes to sometimes.

Tina manages to find Zeke, escorting him to the principal's office again. On the way, Rudy confronts her, claiming that she was his hero, but has broken the rules and "gone dirty". He demands to take Zeke to the principal's office himself to expose her. As students flood the halls, Tina uses the distraction to lead Zeke through another path to the principal's office, hoping to get there before Rudy. On the way, Zeke pleads with Tina once again to let him go. He reveals that his grandmother is fond of mascots and scheduled for surgery and that he wanted to take the mascot from Coach Blevin's office and wear it for her at the retirement home to cheer her up. Tina is sympathetic, but says he should have asked permission. Zeke says that he did seek permission from Coach Blevins, who still said no. After barely evading Ms. LaBonz, Tina makes her way back inside the school through another entrance. Upon entering school however, they are intercepted by Rudy, who alerts Mr. Frond, who cancels Tina's promotion and takes Zeke to the principal's office.

Disgraced, Tina goes to the administrative office and overhears a phone conversation from Zeke's grandmother asking if he will visit her at the retirement home. Realizing that Zeke was telling the truth, she steals the mascot suit. She apologizes to Gene and Louise, and they help her bust Zeke out of the principal's office. She gives him the mascot suit and tells him to go. Mr. Frond confronts her and she protests that the law is too stringent and that people and their situations are complicated, and that ultimately, she believes Zeke. Frond insists that Zeke is a liar and that the story and phone call are a ruse Zeke concocted. He wagers her that if Zeke's story turns out to be fake, Tina will be punished with one month's detention and stripped of her hall monitor privileges. Tina states that if she wins, she only wants that Zeke's suspension be overturned, though Frond also sarcastically adds that he will also buy everyone ice cream. They, including Rudy, arrive at the retirement home and find Zeke's grandmother, but no sign of Zeke. Rudy sympathizes with Tina while Mr. Frond gloats and taunts her until Zeke comes out dancing in the mascot suit. Frond loses the wager and begrudgingly leaves to buy everyone ice cream.

Meanwhile, in a subplot, Bob is vexed when Linda begins hanging customers' napkin doodles as restaurant art, but his own drawings are deemed too terrible by Linda to hang on the wall, with Teddy siding with her. With no other options, he swallows his pride and reluctantly asks the elderly Edith Cranwinkle and her husband Harold, the antagonistic owners of the local art store Reflections, for drawing lessons. Edith begrudgingly accepts him as a student and gives him a crash course that involves him buying art supplies and finally drawing her naked form. Bob triumphantly returns with his drawing of nude Edith, and Linda and the kids celebrate his newfound skill by hanging the picture up on the wall.

== Cultural references ==
The episode's plot, based around a person of authority escorting a criminal to a final location, references several similarly plotted films. The title is an homage to the 1988 action-comedy film Midnight Run, while the plot has various references to the 1993 film The Fugitive. The early structure of the episode with Tina and Rudy also references the 2001 film Training Day.

== Reception ==
Alasdair Wilkins of The A.V. Club gave the episode a B, criticizing the main plot's lack of a clearly defined central conflict. However, Wilkins found the episode enjoyable, stating, "'Midday Run' is such a rollicking good time that it almost doesn't matter how much of a mess it is. Building a story around Tina as a hall monitor gone rogue is all sorts of genius, and there are plenty of terrific laughs to be had from the lengths Tina goes to in her quest to find Zeke, but where the story falters somewhat is in figuring out just what the actual conflict is here." By contrast, Robert Ham of Paste gave the episode a 9.2 out of 10, stating, "The return of Bob's Burgers after a far-too-long hiatus was welcome this week, but it felt even more so with a half-hour that managed to get funnier and funnier as it went along, and was capped off by a great closing moment with the family. And any episode that focuses on the travails of Tina tends to be a near-classic."

The episode received a 2.0 rating and was watched by a total of 3.95 million people. This made it the fourth most watched show on Fox that night, behind Brooklyn Nine-Nine, Family Guy, and The Simpsons, but also the most watched episode of the season thus far.
