= Seaplane! =

- Bob's Burgers episode
- Episode no.: Season 4 Episode 3
- Directed by: Jennifer Coyle
- Written by: Dan Fybel; Rich Rinaldi
- Production code: 3ASA14
- Original air date: November 3, 2013

Guest appearances
- Will Forte as Upskirt Kurt; Kevin Kline as Calvin Fischoeder

Episode chronology
← Previous "Fort Night"	Next → "My Big Fat Greek Bob"
- Bob's Burgers season 4

"Seaplane!" is the third episode of the fourth season of the animated comedy series Bob's Burgers and the overall 48th episode, and is written by Dan Fybel and Rich Rinaldi and directed by Jennifer Coyle. It aired on Fox in the United States on November 3, 2013.

== Plot ==
Linda is dissatisfied by her and Bob's lackluster date nights and proposes that they take seaplane flying lessons. Bob refuses to go, so Linda elects to go by herself. Her instructor, Kurt, listens to her disappointment about Bob not joining her and they begin the lesson. At the restaurant, Teddy and Mr. Fischoeder alarm Bob to Kurt's reputation as a seducer, called "Upskirt Kurt": Kurt seduces his often lonely housewife students, first by faking a near plane crash to up the adrenaline, "saving" them at the last minute, then taking them to the nearby "deserted" Quippiquisset Island (which Mr. Fischoeder refers to as "Quickie Kissit Island") to fix the plane, leaving the two of them alone for romance. True to form, Kurt fakes a plane crash while flying with Linda and the two end up on Quippiquisset Island.

Kurt tries to seduce Linda with a picnic (originally "for his sick, elderly mother") and by playing music, but she rejects his advances because she is happily married, even if her and Bob's love life is stagnant. Kurt accidentally reveals that the entire situation was a set up and Linda is furious. Kurt argues that he is simply giving lonely women what they want, to which Linda responds that women do not want to be tricked into having sex. Linda forces Kurt to take them back to the pier, but Kurt finds that his plane was pulled out with the tide: they are truly stranded on the island. On the pier, receiving confirmation of Kurt's reputation from nearby fishermen, Bob becomes frantic that Linda will be seduced. He and the kids take a small rowboat to the island and Bob attempts to fight Kurt, but is too exhausted from rowing the boat. Mr. Fischoeder passes by in his boat, towing Kurt's plane behind him, which he found floating in the water.

Mr. Fischoder gives them a lift, with Kurt in the boat with him, while Linda, Bob, and the kids ride behind them in the plane. However, Mr. Fischoeder and Kurt crank up the speed on the boat, not realizing that the speed is causing the plane to lift into the air while still tied to the boat. The Belchers panic when they see that the boat plans to pass under a bridge. Afraid they might die, Bob and Linda apologize for not being passionate enough and not being happy with what they had, respectively. Bob finds Kurt's pocket knife in the plane and has no choice but to climb out onto the railing and try to cut the rope. He manages to cut the rope just in time and Linda uses what she learned to pull the plane up and over the bridge. However, Linda realizes that she does not know how to land the plane: she only saw Kurt land after causing a fake nosedive. Linda tries the same and successfully lands the plane near the pier. The adrenaline of the fake plane crash has its effect on Linda and Bob, who jokingly tell the kids to jump out and swim to shore to give them privacy, which Tina does, much to their chagrin.

== Reception ==
Caroline Framke of The A.V. Club gave the episode a B+, saying "Bob's Burgers isn’t big on tricks, nor does it have to be. Instead, the team behind Bob's has created a world so richly weird that much of the fun comes from just throwing the characters together and watching them gleefully bounce off each other. "Seaplane!" cashes in on seasons of character building and therefore doesn't suffer as much from being so aggressively straightforward as other shows might." Robert Ham of Paste gave the episode 9.0 out of 10, saying "Some folks will likely point out the parallels between this plotline and that of The Simpsons episode "Life in the Fast Lane," wherein a silver-tongued bowling instructor (voiced by Albert Brooks) tries to seduce Marge. But such comparisons are unavoidable when it comes to animated sitcoms. And in Bob's Burgers, there's only the semblance of a happy ending. That is if your idea of a happy ending is Bob and Linda threatening to screw in the cabin of a seaplane after forcing their children to swim to shore. To me, this is a perfect example of how the show provides that perfect midpoint between the often-heartfelt approach of The Simpsons and the all-out assault on good taste of Seth MacFarlane's shows. There's enough of each sensibility—and a hearty push/pull between the two—to keep the show bubbly, acidic and infinitely watchable."

The episode received a 1.8 rating and was watched by a total of 3.75 million people. This made it the fourth most watched show on Animation Domination that night, losing to American Dad!, Family Guy and The Simpsons with 5.43 million.
