= Hawk & Chick =

- Bob's Burgers episode
- Episode no.: Season 5 Episode 20
- Directed by: Tyree Dillihay
- Written by: Rich Rinaldi
- Production code: 5ASA09
- Original air date: May 17, 2015

Guest appearances
- Kurt Braunohler as Dominic; Keisuke Hoashi as Kojima; Suzy Nakamura as Yuki

Episode chronology
← Previous "Housetrap"	Next → "The Oeder Games"
- Bob's Burgers season 5

"Hawk & Chick" is the 20th episode of the fifth season of the animated comedy series Bob's Burgers and the overall 87th episode, and is written by Rich Rinaldi and directed by Tyree Dillihay. It aired on Fox in the United States on May 17, 2015.

== Plot ==
While shopping at the farmer's market, Bob and Louise spot Kojima, a Japanese actor who was once the star of a father-daughter samurai series called Hawk & Chick starring himself and his real life daughter. Bob invites him back to the restaurant and plays one of his old movies and is surprised to see Kojima tearing up. Kojima reveals that he was in town to see his daughter, Yuki, who lives there now and whom he has not spoken to for 30 years. Louise decides that in order to reunite Kojima and his daughter the Belchers need to throw a Hawk & Chick film festival and invite both Kojima and Yuki.

Bob and Louise go to the local theatre and are turned down by management who refuses to loan out the theatre on such short notice. However they are approached by Dominic, a theatre employee who tells them he will allow them to use the theatre after hours. After securing the theatre, Bob and Louise go to see Yuki who now works as an accountant. Yuki is reluctant to go to the festival and Bob empathizes with her difficult working relationship with her father. However Louise is distressed by Yuki's indifference to her father and decides to con her into going to the festival, inviting her as a guest without telling her her father will be there.

The festival runs into problems when Dominic can only locate one Hawk & Chick movie in the original Japanese. The family decides to dub the movie over themselves, with Bob playing Hawk and Louise playing Chick. At the actual festival however the dubbing goes awry causing Bob and Louise to have to redub the movie live behind a curtain.

Yuki, already reluctant to take part in the festival, decides to leave. Spotting her departure Bob changes the dialogue in the movie to draw Yuki's attention and let her know that her father loves her. Meanwhile, Louise gets upset and acting as Chick insists that she should be apologizing to Hawk. Bob realizes that Louise's desire to reunite Kojima and Yuki came from a fear that she and Bob could have a rift between them when she got older. Bob promises her that they will always be in each other’s lives. Meanwhile, Kojima reveals himself to Yuki and the two happily reunite.

== Reception ==
Alasdair Wilkins of The A.V. Club gave the episode an A, saying, "'Hawk And Chick' is a very real contender for the sweetest episode in the show's history, and I really hope it doesn't get lost in the shuffle, because it's a gem."

The episode received a 0.9 rating and was watched by a total of 1.95 million people. This made it the fifth most watched show on Fox that night, behind Brooklyn Nine-Nine, a second episode of Bob's Burgers, The Simpsons and Family Guy.
