= The Oeder Games =

- Bob's Burgers episode
- Episode no.: Season 5 Episode 21
- Directed by: Don MacKinnon
- Written by: Scott Jacobson
- Production code: 5ASA08
- Original air date: May 17, 2015

Guest appearances
- Kevin Kline as Mr. Fischoeder; Jay Johnston as Jimmy Pesto; Sarah Silverman as Ollie; Laura Silverman as Andy; Zach Galifianakis as Felix; Bobby Tisdale as Zeke; Andy Kindler as Mort; Fred Stoller as Sal; Melissa Bardin Galsky as Charlotte; Eddie Pepitone as Reggie; Sam Seder as Harold

Episode chronology
← Previous "Hawk & Chick"	Next → "Sliding Bobs"
- Bob's Burgers season 5

"The Oeder Games" is the 21st episode and season finale of the fifth season of the animated comedy series Bob's Burgers. Written by Scott Jacobson and directed by Don MacKinnon, it is also the overall 88th episode, and was aired on Fox in the United States on May 17, 2015.

== Plot ==
The tenants of Ocean Avenue meet in Bob's restaurant to talk about Mr. Fischoeder's latest rent increase, which none of them can afford. Bob rallies the other tenants to join him in a rent strike if Fischoeder will not price their rent more reasonably. Together, all the tenants go to Fischoeder's place to deliver their demand. In response, Fischoeder proposes a water balloon fight on his entire property saying that, though the losers will suffer the rent increase, the winner will have their rent cut in half. Though Bob tries to convince the other tenants not to participate, they quickly fold, grabbing balloons and going into hiding. Louise and the rest of the family conspire to protect Bob, who refuses to attack anyone.

While Gene and Louise leave to acquire more water balloons, Bob convinces Sal, the owner of the porn shop, to quit playing and join him. However Jimmy Pesto gives him a water balloon and convinces him to betray Bob. Sal lobs the water balloon but Linda takes the hit for Bob. Before she leaves for the "porch of losers", she tells Bob to forget about rallying the tenants and focus on winning, handing him her bra to use as a balloon launcher.

After taking out Mort, Bob gives Linda's bra to Gene and Louise who use it to take out the competition and climb a ladder to an ostentatious tree fort located on Fischoeder's grounds. Inside they find Fischoeder's brother, Felix, who uses the treehouse as a guest home, and a bucket of balloons.

Eventually, only Bob, Tina, Jimmy Pesto and his twins, Andy and Ollie, who he is using as human shields, are left. Jimmy knocks out Tina but Louise and Gene, with help from Felix's catapult, take out Andy and Ollie from the tree house. Instead of eliminating Jimmy right away, Bob goes on a rant to the spectators about their playing Fischoeder's game. Annoyed, Fischoeder tells the crowd that he will provide them with balloons and a new game; each time a person hits Bob they will have $50 removed from their rent and Bob will have that amount added to his with the game lasting till sundown.

The children and Linda create diversions so that Bob can escape and seek refuge in an abandoned ferris wheel. Shortly before sundown the crowd finds Bob. Linda tells them to go ahead and attack Bob and says that all the rent increases will destroy their business when all Bob ever wanted to do was help everyone. When Fischoeder arrives to witness Bob being hit, the tenants turn and instead of ballooning Bob, smash their balloons on the ground in protest. After Bob apologizes to Fischoeder for not speaking to him about the rent hike man-to-man before organizing the strike, Fischoeder decides to postpone the rent hike.

The tenants, along with Mr. Fischoeder, engage in a water balloon fight to celebrate.

== Reception ==
Alasdair Wilkins of The A.V. Club ranked the episode as an A, calling the it a triumph as it was able to keep finding new ways to wring jokes and pathos alike from well-established relationships. Tonight’s story isn’t quite as obvious a season finale as last year’s epic two-parter, but it does feel like a conscious effort to expand what we know about the characters and, with it, the storytelling possibilities of the show’s universe." Amber Dowling of IGN gave the episode an 8.0 out of 10, saying, "The fifth season wrapped with an episode that was one part Hunger Games, one part Community paintball and all parts parody. It served to bring all of the supporting characters together in a cohesive storyline while still placing strong emphasis on the central Belcher family, but wrapped with a nice little win for Bob and Linda to hold everyone over until Season 6 returns this fall."

The episode received a 1.1 rating and was watched by a total of 2.44 million people. This made it the third most watched show on Fox that night, behind The Simpsons and Family Guy but ahead of another episode of Bob's Burgers and Brooklyn Nine-Nine.
