= Bob's Burgers season 5 =

Bob's Burgers
- Season 5
- DVD Cover
- No. of episodes: 21

Release
- Original network: Fox
- Original release: October 5, 2014 – May 17, 2015

Season chronology
- ← Previous; Season 4 Next → Season 6

The fifth season of the animated comedy series Bob's Burgers began airing on Fox in the United States on October 5, 2014, and concluded on May 17, 2015.

== Production ==
On September 26, 2013, the series was renewed for a fifth production cycle.

This season featured guest appearances from Kumail Nanjiani, Rachel Dratch, Zach Galifianakis, Bill Hader, Carl Reiner, Molly Shannon, Nick Offerman, Joe Lo Truglio, Jordan Peele, Carly Simon and Keegan-Michael Key.

== Episodes ==
No. overall	No. in season	Title	Directed by	Written by	Original release date	Prod. code	U.S. viewers (millions)
68	1	"Work Hard or Die Trying, Girl"	Jennifer Coyle	Nora Smith	October 5, 2014	4ASA14	3.14
Gene's musical based on Die Hard isn't selected as the school's fall play, so he, with help from Louise, stages a production to run on the same night as Wagstaff Middle School's performance of a Working Girl-inspired musical that features Tina.
69	2	"Tina and the Real Ghost"	Boohwan Lim & Kyounghee Lim	Steven Davis & Kelvin Yu	November 2, 2014	4ASA13	2.89
Tina begins a romance with a ghost after it is believed to be living in the Belchers' basement.
70	3	"Friends with Burger-fits"	Tyree Dillihay	Dan Fybel	November 16, 2014	4ASA11	3.35
Bob and Teddy become workout buddies when Bob finds out that Teddy's bad health is from his burgers. Their friendship is put to the test when they enroll in a stuntman boot camp. Meanwhile, Linda and the kids run an ice wrestling league in their freezer.
71	4	"Dawn of the Peck"	Tyree Dillihay	Lizzie Molyneux & Wendy Molyneux	November 23, 2014	4ASA16	1.90
A wild bird attack causes chaos at the First Annual Fischoeder Turk-tacular Turkey Town Festival when Linda and the kids go there for Thanksgiving. Meanwhile, Bob is boycotting the holiday.
72	5	"Best Burger"	Don MacKinnon	Mike Benner	November 30, 2014	4ASA12	2.23
Bob and the kids attempt to find a missing black garlic ingredient when Bob participates in a burger-tasting contest.
73	6	"Father of the Bob"	Chris Song	Steven Davis & Kelvin Yu	December 7, 2014	4ASA18	3.18
Bob and his father, "Big Bob," try to outdo each other in the kitchen when they rehash an old argument at Big Bob's Christmas party. Meanwhile, the kids compete to get the best present for Bob.
74	7	"Tina Tailor Soldier Spy"	Don MacKinnon	Holly Schlesinger	December 14, 2014	4ASA15	2.54
To find who is leaking their cookie sales leads, Tina starts to spy on her old Thundergirls troop. Meanwhile, Linda dyes her hair blonde.
75	8	"Midday Run"	Ian Hamilton	Scott Jacobson	January 4, 2015	4ASA17	3.95
When Tina gets elected for a big hall monitor promotion, she is determined to do whatever it takes to nab the powerful job, so she enlists the help of Gene and Louise.
76	9	"Speakeasy Rider"	Jennifer Coyle	Rich Rinaldi	January 11, 2015	4ASA20	3.34
Tina, Gene and Louise are ready to put the pedal to the metal when they join a go-kart league. Meanwhile, at the restaurant, Bob and Teddy partner up to serve Teddy's home-brewed beer.
77	10	"Late Afternoon in the Garden of Bob and Louise"	Boohwan Lim & Kyounghee Lim	Jon Schroeder	January 25, 2015	4ASA19	2.49
In order to become an accepted member of the Community Garden, Bob must make a deal that results in giving Logan a job at the restaurant.
78	11	"Can't Buy Me Math"	Tyree Dillihay	Dan Fybel	February 8, 2015	4ASA22	1.94
Tina teams up with Darryl to win the Cupid's Couple contest at the school dance. Meanwhile, Linda plans a week of Valentine's Day activities for her and Bob.
79	12	"The Millie-churian Candidate"	Don MacKinnon	Greg Thompson	February 15, 2015	4ASA21	2.01
Tina and Louise volunteer to run Jimmy, Jr.'s class president campaign in order to prevent Millie from winning, and ruining the school. Meanwhile, Bob becomes obsessed with a $300 knife.
80	13	"The Gayle Tales"	Ian Hamilton	Lizzie Molyneux & Wendy Molyneux	March 1, 2015	5ASA01	3.03
Desperate to get out of the house after being grounded, the kids compete to be Aunt Gayle's "date" for the evening via an essay contest.
81	14	"L'il Hard Dad"	Chris Song	Nora Smith	March 8, 2015	5ASA02	2.56
Bob becomes obsessed with his new automatic helicopter. When it falls apart for no reason, he enters into a battle with the manufacturer in order to receive a refund. Gene assists Bob in his quest, but things quickly get out of hand and end in a crazy helicopter battle. Meanwhile, Louise and Linda help Tina prepare for her oral book report on The Call of the Wild.
82	15	"Adventures in Chinchilla-sitting"	Cecilia Aranovich	Mike Benner	March 15, 2015	5ASA03	2.24
Bob and Linda head out on the town for a date - but to Linda's dismay, Bob's idea of romance proves "trivial". Meanwhile, a wild chinchilla chase ensues after the school pet that Louise was charged with watching escapes out the front door.
83	16	"The Runway Club"	Jennifer Coyle	Steven Davis & Kelvin Yu	March 22, 2015	5ASA04	2.21
The kids are sentenced to Saturday detention, and will do anything it takes to leave early so they can attend the Cotton Candy Festival. Meanwhile, Bob and Linda believe they are being scammed by a young girl at the restaurant.
84	17	"Itty Bitty Ditty Committee"	Bernard Derriman	Holly Schlesinger	April 26, 2015	5ASA05	2.04
Gene starts a band with Tina, Louise, Rudy, Peter and Daryl, only to be kicked out and left on his own. After declaring that he will never play his Casio again, Tina and Louise join forces to help Gene rediscover his love of music. Meanwhile, Linda deals with an armpit rash.
85	18	"Eat, Spray, Linda"	Tyree Dillihay	Jon Schroeder	May 3, 2015	5ASA06	2.24
It's Linda's birthday, and Bob needs more time to plan her birthday surprise. But when he sends her out of the house as a distraction, she goes missing. Mayhem ensues as Bob and the kids must work together to find Linda.
86	19	"Housetrap"	Jennifer Coyle & Bernard Derriman	Dan Fybel	May 10, 2015	5ASA07	2.47
In true Belcher fashion, the family gets stuck in a terrible storm while vacationing at a beach house in Craggy Neck. The storm is the least of their worries, however, when they are forced to take shelter with the mysterious owner of the home.
87	20	"Hawk & Chick"	Tyree Dillihay	Rich Rinaldi	May 17, 2015	5ASA09	1.95
Bob and Louise are thrilled when they meet Hawk, the star of their favorite martial arts series, and are quick to offer help upon learning about his family troubles.
88	21	"The Oeder Games"	Don MacKinnon	Scott Jacobson	May 17, 2015	5ASA08	2.44
With the threat of a rent increase on Ocean Avenue, Bob and the other tenants rebel. After approaching Fischoeder, the tenants find out that they will have to compete in order to convince him to keep their rents reasonable.
