= Sliding Bobs =

- Bob's Burgers episode
- Episode no.: Season 6 Episode 1
- Directed by: Don MacKinnon
- Written by: Greg Thompson
- Production code: 5ASA10
- Original air date: September 27, 2015

Episode chronology
← Previous "The Oeder Games"	Next → "The Land Ship"
- Bob's Burgers season 6

"Sliding Bobs" is the first episode and season premiere of the sixth season of the animated comedy series Bob's Burgers and the overall 89th episode; it is written by Greg Thompson and directed by Don MacKinnon. It aired on Fox in the United States on September 27, 2015. In the episode, Bob begins to notice that he is losing hair from his moustache, and Linda tells how important his moustache was in their meeting. The kids then tell their own versions of how Bob and Linda would have met, if Bob didn't have a moustache at that time.

== Plot ==
=== Prologue ===
Bob is working out on a stationary bike picked up from the trash, but while taking a shower, notices that he's losing hair in his mustache. The discussion of his facial hair leads Linda to tell the story of how she and Bob met: when she was engaged to Hugo, she was at a bar with her friend Ginger and her ring got stuck in Bob's mustache. The encounter led to her leaving Hugo for Bob. With the possibility of Bob losing his mustache, Tina, Gene, and Louise speculate about what life would be like if Bob hadn't had his mustache when he met Linda.

=== Gene's story ===
Gene's story has Bob and Linda at the bar, where Linda accidentally hits Bob on his lip telling a story, and without his mustache, he starts bleeding from a cut on the lip. While at the hospital, Sergeant Bosco comes in and makes Bob faint. Later, Bob wakes up having no memory of what happened, and given a robotic mustache to search for crime. While nitpicking minor and non-existent crimes, he meets Linda on the streets singing about Hugo. When Linda and Bob try to kiss, Bob's mustache electrocutes both of them and shocks back parts of his memory. While trying to confront Bosco about this, it is revealed that the cops are owned by Mr. Fischoeder, who also wishes to tear down the town and replace it with an amusement park city, and that Bosco is Fischoeder under a mask with a robotic eye. A battle ensues in which RoboBob is killed, with Linda putting his robot mustache on a cactus.

=== Louise's story ===
Louise's story has Bob and Linda meet in the bar, where Bob falls in love with Linda at first sight, but Linda does not care as she sarcastically tells him he needs to grow a mustache to win her heart. Determined to win Linda, Bob tries to grow a mustache with various medications and methods. After failing with all of them, Bob goes to an automated carnival attraction, The Swami, only to find it under repair, and instead asks the repairman (Teddy) for a mustache. Although at first he is able to grow a mustache and win Linda, he soon develops uncontrollable hair growth and after being unable to join society, is forced to become a freak show act at the Wonder Wharf, while Linda becomes a nun before being kicked out, and ends up in jail.

=== Tina's story ===
Tina's story tries to make her parents end up together but no scenario works at first, and soon she imagines that Linda would have married Hugo, had three Hugo-versions of the children, and run a hot dog restaurant in the manner of Bob's Burgers, while Bob has become a bitter health inspector like Hugo in the real world. In a parody of the pilot episode, the restaurant is investigated for having real wiener dogs in the hot dog meat, and when Linda tries to cheer him up with a chocolate milkshake, he gains a milkshake mustache but soon leaves. The family is disturbed by this story, and Tina accepts that if Bob hadn't had his mustache, Linda would not have canceled her engagement to Hugo and she would have married him, and also that there is no such thing as fate, just randomness and chaos.

=== Ending ===
While their parents are trying to comfort Tina, Gene sits on the exercise bike but hurts his testicles, and Bob realizes that the bike was responsible for Bob losing his hair by causing testicular failure. Meanwhile, as Ron and Hugo are having lunch in their van, Ron asks Hugo if they were meant to be together, causing Hugo to yell "not this again!"

== Reception ==
Alasdair Wilkins of The A.V. Club gave the episode an A, saying, "Sliding Bobs" manages to have the best of all possible worlds. On the one hand, it's another of the show's increasingly common crazy trilogy episodes, in which we see a common theme developed through each of the Belcher children's uniquely fractured perspectives. This is an episode that gets in goofiest possible Robocop pastiche, a tragically hairy romance, and a deeply self-referential callback to the show's very first episode. That's more than enough material for a fantastic episode! Molly Freeman of Screen Rant praised the episode by saying, "Bob’s Burgers is at its best in episodes like ‘Sliding Bobs’ when the show mixes a serious subject with its own brand of quirky humor that fans have come to know and love."

The episode received a 1.2 rating and was watched by a total of 2.51 million people. This made it the fifth most watched show on Fox that night.
