= List of awards and nominations received by Bob's Burgers =

Bob's Burgers awards and nominations
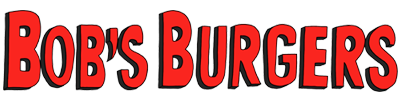
Awards and nominations
Award	Wins	Nominations
ACE Eddie Awards	1	2
Annie Awards	6	17
Artios Awards	1	6
Critics' Choice Television Awards	0	6
Dorian TV Awards	0	1
Environmental Media Awards	0	1
Hollywood Critics Association TV Awards	0	2
People's Choice Awards	0	3
Primetime Emmy Awards	2	14
Teen Choice Awards	0	4
Writers Guild of America Awards	1	11

Totals (Note: Certain award groups do not simply award one winner. They acknowledge several different recipients, have runners-up, and have third place. Since this is a specific recognition and is different from losing an award, runner-up mentions are considered wins in this award tally. For simplification and to avoid errors, each award in this list has been presumed to have had a prior nomination.)
- Wins: 11
- Nominations: 67

Bob's Burgers is an American animated sitcom created by Loren Bouchard for the Fox Broadcasting Company. The series centers on the Belcher family—parents Bob and Linda, and their children Tina, Gene, and Louise—who run a hamburger restaurant. A production between Bento Box Entertainment and 20th Television, the show has aired over 300 episodes and has been renewed for four more seasons.

Throughout its run, the series has received fifteen Annie Award nominations, eleven Writers Guild of America Award nominations under the Television: Animation category, a total of six Critics' Choice Television Award nominations for Best Animated Series, and four Teen Choice Award nominations for Choice TV: Animated Show.

Additionally, the show has received fourteen Primetime Emmy Award nominations for Outstanding Animated Program, winning in 2014 for the episode "Mazel-Tina" and in 2017 for "Bob Actually". For their performances on Bob's Burgers, John Roberts and Kevin Kline both received nominations for the Emmy award for Outstanding Character Voice-Over Performance, losing respectively to Hank Azaria from The Simpsons and Seth MacFarlane from Family Guy.

== Awards and nominations ==
Awards and nominations received by Bob's Burgers
Award	Year (Note: The listed year refers to the date of the ceremony, not necessarily the year in which the corresponding season or episode aired.)	Category	Nominee(s)	Result	Ref.
ACE Eddie Awards	2021	Best Edited Animation (Non-Theatrical)	Jeremy Reuben (for "Bob Belcher and the Terrible, Horrible, No Good, Very Bad Kids")	Nominated	
ACE Eddie Awards	2022	Best Edited Animation (Non-Theatrical)	Jeremy Reuben (for "Vampire Disco Death Dance")	Won	
Annie Awards	2013	Best General Audience Animated Television Production	Bob's Burgers (for "Ear-sy Rider")	Nominated	
Annie Awards	2014	Best General Audience Animated Television/Broadcast Production	Bob's Burgers	Nominated	
Annie Awards	2015	Best General Audience Animated Television/Broadcast Production	Bob's Burgers	Nominated	
Annie Awards	2015	Outstanding Achievement, Directing in an Animated Television/Broadcast Production	Jennifer Coyle and Bernard Derriman	Nominated	
Annie Awards	2016	Best General Audience Animated Television/Broadcast Production	Bob's Burgers (for "Can't Buy Me Math")	Nominated	
Annie Awards	2016	Outstanding Achievement, Voice Acting in an Animated Television/Broadcast Production	Kristen Schaal (for "Hawk & Chick")	Won	
Annie Awards	2016	Outstanding Achievement, Writing in an Animated Television/Broadcast Production	Steven Davis and Kelvin Yu (for "The Hauntening")	Won	
Annie Awards	2017	Best General Audience Animated Television/Broadcast Production	Bob's Burgers (for "Glued, Where's My Bob?")	Won	
Annie Awards	2017	Outstanding Achievement, Music in an Animated Television/Broadcast Production	Bob's Burgers (for "Glued, Where's My Bob?")	Nominated	
Annie Awards	2017	Outstanding Achievement, Writing in an Animated Television/Broadcast Production	Lizzie and Wendy Molyneux (for "The Hormone-iums")	Won	
Annie Awards	2017	Outstanding Achievement, Editorial in an Animated Television/Broadcast Production	Mark Seymour, Chuck Smith, and Eric Davidson (for "Sea Me Now")	Nominated	
Annie Awards	2018	Outstanding Achievement for Editorial in an Animated Television/Broadcast Production	Mark Seymour, Chuck Smith, and Eric Davidson (for "Bob Actually")	Nominated	
Annie Awards	2019	Best General Audience Animated Television/Broadcast Production	Bob's Burgers (for "The Bleakening")	Nominated	
Annie Awards	2020	Outstanding Achievement for Voice Acting in an Animated Television/Broadcast Production	H. Jon Benjamin (for "Roamin' Bob-iday")	Won	
Annie Awards	2022	Best General Audience Animated Television Production	Bob's Burgers (for "Fingers-loose")	Nominated	
Annie Awards	2023	Best Mature Audience Animated Television/Broadcast Production	Bob's Burgers (for "Some Like it Bot Part 1: Eighth Grade Runner")	Won	
Annie Awards	2024	Best Mature Audience Animated Television/Broadcast Production	Bob's Burgers (for "Amelia")	Nominated	
Annie Awards	2025	Best Mature Audience Animated Television/Broadcast Production	Bob's Burgers (for "They Slug Horses, Don't They?")	Won	
Artios Awards	2013	Outstanding Achievement in Casting – Television Animation	Julie Ashton-Barson	Nominated	
Artios Awards	2015	Outstanding Achievement in Casting – Television Animation	Julie Ashton-Barson	Nominated	
Artios Awards	2016	Outstanding Achievement in Casting – Television Animation	Julie Ashton-Barson	Won	
Artios Awards	2020	Outstanding Achievement in Casting – Television Animation	Julie Ashton-Barson	Nominated	
Artios Awards	2021	Outstanding Achievement in Casting – Television Animation	Julie Ashton-Barson	Nominated	
Artios Awards	2022	Outstanding Achievement in Casting – Television Animation	Julie Ashton-Barson	Nominated	
Critics' Choice Television Awards	2012	Best Animated Series	Bob's Burgers	Nominated	
Critics' Choice Television Awards	2014	Best Animated Series	Bob's Burgers	Nominated	
Critics' Choice Television Awards	2015	Best Animated Series	Bob's Burgers	Nominated	
Critics' Choice Television Awards	2016	Best Animated Series	Bob's Burgers	Nominated	
Critics' Choice Television Awards	2016	Best Animated Series	Bob's Burgers	Nominated	
Critics' Choice Television Awards	2018	Best Animated Series	Bob's Burgers	Nominated	
Dorian TV Awards	2021	Best Animated Show	Bob's Burgers	Nominated	
Environmental Media Awards	2015	Television Episodic Comedy	Bob's Burgers (for "Late Afternoon in the Garden of Bob and Louise")	Nominated	
Hollywood Critics Association TV Awards	2021	Best Animated Series or Animated Television Movie	Bob's Burgers	Nominated	
Hollywood Critics Association TV Awards	2022	Best Broadcast Network or Cable Animated Series or TV Movie	Bob's Burgers	Nominated	
Peabody Awards	2022	Entertainment	Bob's Burgers	Nominated	
People's Choice Awards	2015	Favorite Animated TV Show	Bob's Burgers	Nominated	
People's Choice Awards	2016	Favorite Animated TV Show	Bob's Burgers	Nominated	
People's Choice Awards	2017	Favorite Animated TV Show	Bob's Burgers	Nominated	
Primetime Emmy Awards	2012	Outstanding Animated Program	Bob's Burgers (for "Burgerboss")	Nominated	
Primetime Emmy Awards	2013	Outstanding Animated Program	Bob's Burgers (for "O.T.: The Outside Toilet")	Nominated	
Primetime Emmy Awards	2014	Outstanding Animated Program	Bob's Burgers (for "Mazel-Tina")	Won	
Primetime Emmy Awards	2015	Outstanding Animated Program	Bob's Burgers (for "Can't Buy Me Math")	Nominated	
Primetime Emmy Awards	2015	Outstanding Character Voice-Over Performance	John Roberts (for "Eat, Spray, Linda")	Nominated	
Primetime Emmy Awards	2016	Outstanding Animated Program	Bob's Burgers (for "The Horse Rider-er")	Nominated	
Primetime Emmy Awards	2017	Outstanding Animated Program	Bob's Burgers (for "Bob Actually")	Won	
Primetime Emmy Awards	2017	Outstanding Character Voice-Over Performance	Kevin Kline (for "The Last Gingerbread House on the Left")	Nominated	
Primetime Emmy Awards	2018	Outstanding Animated Program	Bob's Burgers (for "V for Valentine-detta")	Nominated	
Primetime Emmy Awards	2019	Outstanding Animated Program	Bob's Burgers (for "Just One of the Boyz 4 Now for Now")	Nominated	
Primetime Emmy Awards	2020	Outstanding Animated Program	Bob's Burgers (for "Pig Trouble in Little Tina")	Nominated	
Primetime Emmy Awards	2021	Outstanding Animated Program	Bob's Burgers (for "Worms of In-Rear-Ment")	Nominated	
Primetime Emmy Awards	2022	Outstanding Animated Program	Bob's Burgers (for "Some Like It Bot Part 1: Eighth Grade Runner")	Nominated	
Primetime Emmy Awards	2023	Outstanding Animated Program	Bob's Burgers (for "The Plight Before Christmas")	Nominated	
Primetime Emmy Awards	2024	Outstanding Animated Program	Bob's Burgers (for "The Amazing Rudy")	Nominated	
Primetime Emmy Awards	2025	Outstanding Animated Program	Bob's Burgers (for "They Slug Horses, Don’t They?")	Nominated	
Teen Choice Awards	2011	Choice TV: Animated Show	Bob's Burgers	Nominated	
Teen Choice Awards	2012	Choice TV: Animated Show	Bob's Burgers	Nominated	
Teen Choice Awards	2013	Choice TV: Animated Show	Bob's Burgers	Nominated	
Teen Choice Awards	2017	Choice TV: Animated Show	Bob's Burgers	Nominated	
Writers Guild of America Awards	2015	Television: Animation	Gregory Thompson (for "Bob and Deliver")	Nominated	
Writers Guild of America Awards	2015	Television: Animation	Nora Smith (for "Work Hard or Die Trying, Girl")	Nominated	
Writers Guild of America Awards	2016	Television: Animation	Dan Fybel (for "Housetrap")	Won	
Writers Guild of America Awards	2016	Television: Animation	Lizzie and Wendy Molyneux (for "Gayle Makin' Bob Sled")	Nominated	
Writers Guild of America Awards	2018	Television: Animation	Lizzie and Wendy Molyneux (for "Brunchsquatch")	Nominated	
Writers Guild of America Awards	2019	Television: Animation	Rich Rinaldi (for "Boywatch")	Nominated	
Writers Guild of America Awards	2019	Television: Animation	Lizzie and Wendy Molyneux (for "Just One of the Boyz 4 Now for Now")	Nominated	
Writers Guild of America Awards	2019	Television: Animation	Steven Davis (for "Mo Mommy, Mo Problems")	Nominated	
Writers Guild of America Awards	2020	Television: Animation	Kelvin Yu (for "Bed, Bob & Beyond")	Nominated	
Writers Guild of America Awards	2020	Television: Animation	Steven Davis (for "The Gene Mile")	Nominated	
Writers Guild of America Awards	2021	Television: Animation	Katie Crown (for "Prank You for Being A Friend")	Nominated	
