= Bob's Burgers season 10 =

Season of television series

Bob's Burgers
- Season 10
- DVD cover
- No. of episodes: 22

Release
- Original network: Fox
- Original release: September 29, 2019 – May 17, 2020

Season chronology
- ← Previous; Season 9 Next → Season 11

The tenth season of the animated comedy series Bob's Burgers premiered on Fox on September 29, 2019, and concluded on May 17, 2020.

== Production ==
In April 2020, the show joined the rest of Fox's Animation Domination lineup in a partnership with Caffeine for the AniDom Beyond Show, a recap show hosted by Andy Richter. The hour-long program featured interviews with guests and live interactivity with fans online, with recaps for the episodes that aired through April and May. The Bob's Burgers episode aired on May 3, 2020, featuring Loren Bouchard, Wendy Molyneux, Steven Davis, Lizzie Molyneux, and H. Jon Benjamin. On May 18, 2020, Holly Schlesinger joined the show with other writers from the Fox Animation Domination lineup.

The DVD for season 10 was released on June 23, 2020.

== Episodes ==
No. overall	No. in season	Title	Directed by	Written by	Original release date	Prod. code	U.S. viewers (millions)
173	1	"The Ring (But Not Scary)"	Mario D'Anna	Lizzie Molyneux & Wendy Molyneux	September 29, 2019	9ASA01	1.82
When Gene loses Bob's expensive (by Belcher standards) anniversary/engagement ring in a water park, with the help of Nat the Limo Driver, the family sans Linda sneak in at night to find it. Meanwhile, Gayle wants Linda to help her treat pink eye from her cat but flinches every time the eyedrops come near her.
174	2	"Boys Just Wanna Have Fungus"	Ryan Mattos	Dan Fybel	October 6, 2019	9ASA02	2.34
To make a new burger of the day, Bob and Gene head to the forest to find some truffle mushrooms, but get cornered by some thieves in the process. Meanwhile, Tina gets new glasses and Louise convinces her that they must be super spy prescription glasses sent to her by accident.
175	3	"Motor, She Boat"	Tom Riggin	Holly Schlesinger	October 13, 2019	9ASA03	1.64
Tina and Bob go to a Thunder Girls event to build boats together, but Tina gets upset at Bob when he messes up their father-daughter boat. Also, the other Thunder Girls are attempting to cheat in the competition. Meanwhile, Linda takes Gene and Louise to the fire station, but Louise says it's boring because they aren't toddlers anymore.
176	4	"Pig Trouble in Little Tina"	Chris Song	Nora Smith	October 20, 2019	9ASA04	2.45
After attempting to dissect a pig in science class, then insulting it with her classmates, Tina has nightmares in which the dead pig's ghost haunts her. Meanwhile, Linda tries to help Bob get some earwax out of his ears.
177	5	"Legends of the Mall"	Matthew Long	Greg Thompson	November 3, 2019	9ASA05	1.51
After stumbling upon a sleeping boy at the mall, Tina pretends to be his girlfriend, impressing the boy's friends as well as the mall security guard, Tammy, and Jocelyn. Meanwhile, Gene and Louise ride motorized animal cars, Bob goes shopping for pants, and Linda goes to a book reading by her favorite author.
178	6	"The Hawkening: Look Who's Hawking Now!"	Mario D'Anna	Rich Rinaldi	November 10, 2019	9ASA06	2.06
Bob and Louise plan a movie night with the help of Dominic from the movie theater, who gets them never-before-seen footage of Hawk and Chick. Louise forges Bob's signature to get the $1000 security deposit to rent the film. She invites the whole school to see the movie at the restaurant as well as Shinji Kojima, (the actor who plays Hawk). However, during the movie screening, the second reel to the film is stolen.
179	7	"Land of the Loft"	Tom Riggin	Steven Davis	November 17, 2019	9ASA08	1.88
Bob and Linda are invited to a late night loft party and Jen babysits Tina, Gene and Louise while they are out. Jen arrives in an ice cream truck, and the kids convince her to go for a ride around town.
180	8	"Now We're Not Cooking with Gas"	Ryan Mattos	Katie Crown	November 24, 2019	9ASA07	2.29
Bob has been on the waiting list for 5 years for a very rare turkey from Riverbrook Lake Farms. On his way home, he drives slowly in order to keep the turkey safe. However, before he is able to cook the turkey, a gas leak leaves him unable to use the oven. Bob does anything he can to cook his precious turkey and slowly loses his grip on reality.
181	9	"All That Gene"	Matthew Long	Kelvin Yu	December 1, 2019	9ASA10	1.60
Teddy gets asked to help out at a local theater called The Happy Mask. The resident troupe, the "Sad Mask Players" need assistance with their latest play. One of the kids in the show drops out and Gene auditions to replace him. Linda makes a deal with the director of the play to ensure Gene gets the part, without telling Gene.
182	10	"Have Yourself a Maily Linda Christmas"	Chris Song	Scott Jacobson	December 15, 2019	9ASA09	2.41
Linda gets a temp job at the post office to help sort gifts. A late delivery ends up not being sent so Linda attempts to make sure it gets delivered for Christmas. Meanwhile, Linda's parents and Gayle come over and Bob is scrambling to mediate between all of them. Gene and Louise worry what they are going to get Tina for their kid only gift exchange.
183	11	"Drumforgiven"	Mario D'Anna	Jon Schroeder	January 12, 2020	9ASA11	5.76
Gene's abiding love for an electronic drum kit at a pawn store leads to his banishment by sour store owner Dino, (Voiced by returning guest Bobcat Goldthwait) so Louise decides to seek revenge against his wishes. Bob is mildly annoyed but indifferent when Teddy rants at him about doing some work at Jimmy Pesto's, but Linda tries to convince Bob that Teddy wants him to be upset so he'll know Bob cares about him.
184	12	"A Fish Called Tina"	Ryan Mattos	Dan Fybel	February 16, 2020	9ASA12	1.51
The 8th graders get assigned to mentor the 4th graders, but Tina's efforts to bond with her "little fish" are an unceasing disaster, so she goes to her former "big fish" for advice. Meanwhile, Bob and Linda work out at the new gym which moved into the Store Next Door and wants to quickly find a way to get out of their membership.
185	13	"Three Girls and a Little Wharfy"	Tom Riggin	Holly Schlesinger	February 23, 2020	9ASA13	1.58
Jessica and her friend Megan are on the search for a sea monster, Louise finds out and ends up joining in on their plan. Meanwhile, it's spirit week at school and Bob takes classes from someone who supposedly is a master chef.
186	14	"Wag the Song"	Chris Song	Greg Thompson	March 1, 2020	9ASA14	1.43
Wagstaff School needs a new school song, and Mr. Frond is very wary about the idea that the students will not only write competing tunes but have the final say on which one is picked. Gene and Louise's entry is a tad scatalogical. Meanwhile, Bob and Linda have a fresh hassle in the form of Jimmy Pesto's new metal shop awning, which reflects blinding sunlight into the burger store. Teddy tries to help with cardboard.
187	15	"Yurty Rotten Scoundrels"	Tom Riggin	Katie Crown	March 8, 2020	9ASA16	1.28
Linda and Tina agree to help Gayle bulk up the numbers (to make three people) for her new creative workshop, "Art Up Your Engines". It's held in the woods inside a large yurt. The workshop is weird and horrible, but the only genuine attendee is not who she seems. Meanwhile, Gene and Louise pretend to bus tables for an overworked Bob while overseeing a scheme to find a lost cat.
188	16	"Flat-Top o' the Morning to Ya"	Ryan Mattos	Rich Rinaldi	March 15, 2020	9ASA15	1.44
It's Saint Patrick's Day, and Linda and Teddy decide to get into the spirit of the occasion by dyeing all of the food and drink in the restaurant green. Meanwhile, Bob and the kids attend a liquidation auction of a barbecue joint to get some tasty crockery bargains. Soon enough, they become involved in a stupid conspiracy to steal a flat-top grill from under the eyes of the auctioneer, on behalf of the defunct store's former owner.
189	17	"Just the Trip"	Chris Song	Lizzie Molyneux & Wendy Molyneux	March 22, 2020	9ASA17	1.31
Bob has to close the restaurant due to a leaky ceiling, and he reluctantly accompanies his family and Natalie the limo driver on a road trip. The mission? To deliver a depressed snake to Nat's ex-girlfriend's animal sanctuary. The voyage swiftly goes wrong, and an ordeal of vomit, terrible overpriced exit ramp attractions, forged teen steam diaries, paralyzing phobias and reptile escape attempts ensues. Meanwhile, Teddy is alone in the closed restaurant, and abandons his repair work after two minutes to don Bob's apron, cook himself a 'Tedder Cheddar' cheeseburger and go a little bit I Am Legend-style insane.
190	18	"Tappy Tappy Tappy Tap Tap Tap"	Ryan Mattos	Jon Schroeder	April 19, 2020	9ASA18	1.36
Tina attends her friend Josh's tap dance recital dress rehearsal, figuring he wants to win her back, so she plans to tell him she'd rather just be friends, but she turns detective when Josh meets with a suspicious knee-injury "accident" mid-performance. Meanwhile, Gene and Louise compete for the chance to get their own self-crafted Burger of the Day on the menu.
191	19	"The Handyman Can"	Tom Riggin	Kelvin Yu	April 26, 2020	9ASA19	1.29
After a fan he installed causes a fire and burns down Reggy's gazebo, Teddy loses confidence in his handyman skills and refuses to repair the burger store's walk-in. When Bob plans to hire a different contractor using money earmarked for a trip to the trampoline park, the kids tell Teddy three stories in which he saves the day, in an attempt to restore his mojo.
192	20	"Poops!... I Didn't Do It Again"	Chris Song	Steven Davis	May 3, 2020	9ASA20	1.17
Louise and her class go on a sleep-over trip to the aquarium; however, she fears she will not be able to go to the restroom there, since she has a phobia about using bathrooms outside her home. Meanwhile, Linda insists that Bob and the kids must get involved with a video for her parents' anniversary - so they dress up as giant pickles.
193	21	"Local She-ro"	Ryan Mattos	Scott Jacobson	May 10, 2020	9ASA21	1.04
Linda and Tina embark on the trail of a legendary and now 'has-been' local singer, and stumble on a strange cover-up about her fate. Meanwhile, Teddy turns to Bob and the other kids for help getting one over on the host of a sports radio show, with whom the handyman frequently argues.
194	22	"Prank You for Being a Friend"	Tom Riggin	Katie Crown	May 17, 2020	9ASA22	1.28
Kaylee from "A Fish Called Tina" wants Louise to teach her how to get in trouble so she'll get expelled and can be home-schooled, and Louise is a triple agent between Kaylee and Mr. Frond until she decides to genuinely help Kaylee instead. Elsewhere, Bob disgustedly delivers Jimmy Pesto's medicine because no one else wants to help Jimmy, but Bob then becomes enamored by the arcade games and fun gadgets Jimmy has in his bachelor apartment.
