= Bob's Burgers season 14 =

Bob's Burgers
- Season 14
- Promotional poster for the fourteenth season
- No. of episodes: 16

Release
- Original network: Fox
- Original release: October 1, 2023 – September 22, 2024

Season chronology
- ← Previous; Season 13 Next → Season 15

The fourteenth season of the American animated television series Bob's Burgers aired on Fox from October 1, 2023 to September 22, 2024.

Due to the 2023 Writers Guild of America and SAG-AFTRA strikes, the season had fewer episodes than usual, with 16 rather than the originally planned 22.

== Production ==
Despite being the fourteenth broadcast season, the season has to-date been composed mostly of episodes from the thirteenth production cycle of the show (which are noted by the production codes DASAxx) which was ordered in September 2020.

Various roles were formally recast during the season. Black, trans actress Jari Jones replaced David Herman in voicing the character Marshmallow in the season's first episode, "Fight at the Not Okay Chore-al". Bouchard signaled that they were working to recast Marshmallow in 2020 after addressing controversy over the casting of white actress Kristen Bell as the mixed-race character Molly in Bouchard's other show Central Park. After Bouchard announced on Twitter that Molly would be recast in Season 2 to be played by a Black voice actress, another user requested that they do the same for Marshmallow on Bob's Burgers, to which Bouchard responded, "On it." Veteran voice actor Eric Bauza replaced Jay Johnston in the role of Jimmy Pesto Sr. in the fifth episode of the season "Bully-ieve It or Not", following Johnston's 2023 arrest by the FBI for his involvement in the January 6 United States Capitol attack in 2021. His involvement resulted in reports of Johnston being fired and the show cutting ties with him in late 2021. He pleaded guilty to a felony charge for his actions in 2024. Johnston's last episode voicing Jimmy Pesto Sr. was in the Season 11 episode "Bridge Over Troubled Rudy".

== Episodes ==
No. overall	No. in season	Title	Directed by	Written by	Original release date	Prod. code	U.S. viewers (millions)
261	1	"Fight at the Not Okay Chore-ral"	Bernard Derriman	Nora Smith	October 1, 2023	CASA22	1.23
The Belchers are at odds when Bob and Linda ask the kids to take on more chores. In an attempt to understand one another's positions, they tell a bedtime story to each other where Bob and Linda are the sheriffs of a Western town at odds with the kids, who are townsfolk. Their storytelling reveals the deeper issues affecting each side — Linda and Bob believing additional responsibility will help the kids grow into better adults, and Louise in particular working through her anger at overreach by other adults in her life. After seeing Linda frustrated to tears, Louise apologizes and Linda explains that she felt pressured after a call with their grandmother Gloria to raise them according to Gloria's advice. They both finish the story by concluding that their town is fine as it is and that Linda will run the town her way. Note: This episode marks the debut of actress Jari Jones as Marshmallow, taking over the role from David Herman.
262	2	"The Amazing Rudy"	Ryan Mattos	Lizzie Molyneux-Logelin & Wendy Molyneux	October 8, 2023	DASA01	0.82
Rudy emotionally prepares for another awkward monthly dinner with his divorced parents and their new partners by preparing a new magic trick to perform at the dinner table. When the trick goes wrong, Rudy runs away from the restaurant and eventually wanders by the Belcher residence. The Belchers eventually realize, as Rudy joins them for dinner, that Rudy ran away. They call his parents and Bob prepares to drive him back. However, seeing how distraught Rudy is, Louise offers to join Rudy at the restaurant to keep him company. Bob and Linda admire the kind daughter they've raised. Rudy and Louise join Rudy's family at dinner.
263	3	"The Pickleorette"	Chris Song	Steven Davis	October 22, 2023	DASA02	0.78
Gretchen screws up her sister Jestain's bachelorette party: she forgets to invite Jestain's friends and forgets to book a limo and the party is tonight. She pressures Linda to help her. They borrow Nat's limo, which Bob drives, and invite Gayle and Jestain's former school teacher to fill in for Jestain's friends. When the strip club Pickles turns out to be closed for fumigation, Linda rigs the restaurant up to look like a club while Bob tries calling some strippers to come last minute. When it seems that the strippers aren't coming, Gretchen tearfully apologizes to Jestain, ashamed for messing up everything and being a failure of an older sister. Jestain tells her she still looks up to Gretchen, in spite of the way the evening has gone. The strippers arrive, having received Bob's voicemails. They perform the routine, saving the night. Meanwhile, Tina pressures Gene and Louise into playing a board game she found, but finds the game to be miserable. Instead, they sneak down to the restaurant in the crawlspace to watch the strippers, but find their view blocked by the grate.
264	4	"Running Down a Gene"	Matthew Long	Holly Schlesinger	October 29, 2023	DASA03	0.91
Gene writes the perfect song in a dream and is desperate to remember it in time to enter it for a songwriting contest. He learns about lucid dreaming from Mr. Ambrose and begins recording his dreams to allow him to recall his original dream. But upon reenacting it, he finds that the song isn't anywhere as good as he remembered. He is despondent, but Bob advises him that great things come from hard work. This inspires Gene to write an insightful song about the danger of missing the bigger picture when chasing dreams. The family praises the new song, and Gene likes it so much he decides to save the song for his future album, rather than sign it away to the contest. Meanwhile, a cricket inside the house drives Linda mad with its chirping. She offers Louise and Tina ten dollars to find it and trap it. After several failed attempts and many traps, the girls succeed and earn their reward.
265	5	"Bully-ieve It or Not"	Brian Loschiavo	Jon Schroeder	November 5, 2023	DASA04	1.56
New student Will arrives at Wagstaff, unnerving Zeke, who knows him from years ago. The others conclude that Zeke must have been bullied by Will, but are shocked when Zeke reveals that he was the bully, something he is deeply ashamed of. Jimmy Jr. urges Zeke to confront his past by apologizing to Will, but when he does, Will reveals that the worst thing Zeke did to him was make fun of his speech impediment. This devastates Jimmy Jr. because of his own speech impediment and Zeke swears he knew how wrong it was and offers to lick a wall covered in boogers to demonstrate his remorse is genuine. When Zeke is about to lick it, Will and Jimmy Jr. stop him and forgive him. Zeke is so grateful, he licks the wall and playfully chases after all of them. Meanwhile, Bob comes up with a recipe idea that Jimmy Pesto Sr. promptly steals, to great success. Furious, Bob confronts Jimmy, but advice from Linda, Teddy, and Mort help him recognize that he is better than Jimmy, and that Jimmy's success with a stolen idea is fleeting compared to his own ability to generate more good ideas on his own. Note: This episode marks the recasting of Jimmy Pesto Sr. with Eric Bauza following Jay Johnston's termination as a result of his arrest for involvement in the 2021 January 6 United States Capitol attack.
266	6	"Escape from Which Island?"	Chris Song	Rich Rinaldi	November 12, 2023	DASA06	1.43
As a severe storm approaches, Mr. Fischoeder hires Bob as his private chef on a secret island for eccentric, wealthy, influential gentlemen. The weekend event soon turns into a drug-fueled rave, then murderous brawl, with Bob the only sober voice of reason. Mr. Fischoeder comes to his senses and surprisingly assists Bob with executing a plan to get everyone safely back to the mainland. Meanwhile back at home, Linda and the kids throw a mocktail party for Tina to teach her social skills. Though the complexities of social interaction overwhelm her, Tina manages to recall all the detailed etiquette thrown at her.
267	7	"The (Raccoon) King and I"	Ryan Mattos	Scott Jacobson	November 19, 2023	DASA05	0.86
A live concert is set up in front of the Belcher's restaurant but they can't see the stage, which complicates Louise's plan to let friends watch it from her bedroom window in exchange for candy. Linda takes to caring for an injured raccoon behind their dumpster. After she calls Animal Control she regrets it when Teddy tells her they might kill the raccoon. The band's road manager makes small talk with Bob, telling him the band is actually miserable, broke, and regret their careers, which makes Bob question his own career. In resolution, although the view from upstairs is lousy, Louise and Gene manage to fool their school friends into enjoying it; Linda manages to help the raccoon escape from Animal Control; and Bob's fears are quelled when he learns that the band still has moments when they love their jobs, in spite of the downsides.
268	8	"Wharf, Me Worry?"	Matthew Long	Katie Crown	November 26, 2023	DASA07	0.87
Big Bob picks up his grandkids for a day at the wharf, though Bob worries that his father's constant pessimistic comments about the world's future will eventually affect the kids negatively. At the wharf, the kids sneak into a booth that controls Clamstradamus, a talking clam attraction that speaks to passersby, but later get accidentally locked inside. Worried when he hasn't heard from the kids, Bob goes to the wharf, leading Big Bob to suspect that he doesn't trust him with the kids. Bob finds the kids, and uses the booth to express his concerns anonymously to Big Bob, who responds to the clam that he is actually optimistic that his grandkids will one day solve the problems he tells them about. Bob is touched and has the kids meet up with their grandpa, now comfortable leaving them with him. Meanwhile, Linda struggles to help Teddy, who is unable to take a friendly photo of himself for a handyman services website. Linda finds success when she discovers that Teddy looks happiest and friendliest when he's eating a burger.
269	9	"Fraud of the Dead: Zombie-docu-pocalypse"	Brian Loschiavo	Jameel Saleem	December 3, 2023	DASA08	1.30
Presented as a home movie being filmed by the Belcher kids, the episode begins as a documentary about Louise's (alleged) superhuman archery skills. The documentary is interrupted when an off-looking Teddy starts banging on the front door while moaning incomprehensibly. When he attacks Mort the Belchers realize he's a zombie. More zombified neighbors appear and try to get in, so the Belchers barricade themselves in, along with Rudy, Ollie and Andy. When the zombies break through the barricade Louise discovers the zombies' weakness is mustard. Bob and Linda sacrifice themselves to hold back the zombies while their kids escape. The zombies grab Rudy but Louise fails to use her archery to save him, revealing she faked her skills for internet fame - her arms aren't strong enough to draw back the bowstring. The Belcher kids stock up on mustard and hide in Louise's bedroom. When the zombies break in, Louise discovers she can use her legs to draw back the bowstring. She manages to kill the intruding zombies (including her parents) but when her arrows run out the zombies overpower them. The kids ultimately survive because they're covered in mustard. The home movie ends and Belcher family, all watching from the couch, are proud of their kids' movie.
270	10	"The Nightmare 2 Days Before Christmas"	Ryan Mattos	Lindsey Stoddart	December 17, 2023	DASA09	1.50
Two days before Christmas, the Belchers' electricity goes out due to an electrical overload while doing laundry. Their electrician tells them their home's shoddy wiring will take several days to fix. Their landlord, Mr. Fischoeder, agrees to let the Belchers spend Christmas at his unused hunting lodge in the mountains. The Belchers take their Christmas tree with them, strapped to their car's roof, but lose it some time during the steep drive up the mountain. At the lodge, a disturbing painting in the kitchen bothers Bob. In the morning, Linda drives to town for groceries and spots their lost Christmas tree down a snowy ravine and attempts to retrieve it. The Belcher kids, using various objects, write their family's name in the snow so Santa knows where to deliver their presents. As the sun sets Linda gives up on trying to pull their tree out of the ravine and returns home. The kids surprise their parents with their own homemade tree and by covering up the disturbing painting.
271	11	"Mission Impossi-Bob"	Chris Song	Steven Davis	January 7, 2024	DASA10	0.98
Bob gets a call from Teddy, who has accidentally got himself stuck inside a client's walk-in safe. He needs Bob to come rescue him, so the client won't find out and fire him. However, because the eccentric client blindfolded him during the car ride to his house, Teddy doesn't know where he is. Despite initially feeling inadequate to the task, Bob uses deductive problem solving and what little information Teddy can provide about the journey to locate and rescue the trapped handyman. Meanwhile, Linda and the kids are visited by a victorious basketball team and decide to make them a giant celebratory hamburger, the 'Beef-hemoth'. When it is too big for them to finish eating, the Belchers to enjoy the rest of it for supper.
272	12	"Jade in the Shade"	Matthew Long	Jon Schroeder	March 10, 2024	DASA11	0.79
During a historical tour, Louise and Linda learn of the Jade Jellyfish, a lost treasure hidden somewhere in Wonder Wharf by legendary smuggler Slippery Sam a hundred years ago. Louise notices that certain clues refer to the secret Fischoeder clubhouse under the wharf that only the Belchers know about. She convinces Linda to help her find it, who doesn't believe it is true, but wishes to spend time with Louise and support her ambitions. Sneaking below the wharf, Louise's suspicions are proven correct when she successfully manages, despite some danger, to find the statue in a hidden wall panel. However, they are intercepted by Mr. Fischoeder, who confiscates it, as it was hidden on his property. He later informs them that the appraisal determined that the statue was only made of cheap dyed quartz, which he sold for $100. He gives Louise a portion for finding it, which she proudly displays above her bed commemorating her first treasure-finding. Meanwhile, Bob, Gene, Teddy, and Tina are asked to judge which impressive street performer deserves the spot previously occupied by a now-deceased performer. They are ultimately moved by the final performer, a man who humbly plays PVC pipes as an instrument, but he opts to split the space with the other three.
273	13	"Butt Sweat and Fears"	Brian Loschiavo	Holly Schlesinger	May 19, 2024	DASA12	0.59
Tina attends a house party, with the goal of slow dancing later with Jimmy Jr. and touching "upper butts". However, her butt sweat from the fast-paced dancing causes her to soak through her skirt. She sneaks to the laundry room to dry it, but the dryer door becomes stuck with her skirt inside. A fellow student, Sam, hides in the laundry room, expressing severe anxiety about slow dancing and being at the party at all. Sam helps Tina recover her skirt, and opts to stay behind out of fear, while Tina leaves to dance with Jimmy Jr. Reflecting on the joy of dancing, she instead goes back to get Sam and encourages him to relax and to have fun with her, a friend, and the two slow dance together. Meanwhile, Teddy uses some left over wooden pallets to build a bar and seating in the Belchers' basement. It inadvertently becomes a hit with Dalton and his influencer friends, helping the restaurant get good business. However, the pallets contain wood beetles and they quickly dispose of the pallets after everyone leaves.
274	14	"The Big Stieblitzki"	Ryan Mattos	Scott Jacobson	September 8, 2024	DASA13	1.91
Rudy's father, Sylvester, invites the Belchers to his bowling birthday party. Rudy is anxious that his mom's charismatic boyfriend Paul will upstage his father and harm his self esteem. Rudy enlists the Belcher children to make Sylvester look cool by sneaking into the back of the bowling lanes with a plan to knock over pins so Sylvester can beat Paul. However, Louise overhears Rudy's mom confronting Sylvester, and learns that Sylvester is intentionally losing to make Paul look good. Louise convinces Rudy to abandon the plan, realizing that Rudy is the one who is uncomfortable, not his dad. Rudy talks with his dad after the party, and Sylvester admits that he lost on purpose because Paul is important to Rudy's mom and now a part of their lives. Despite the divorce, he is optimistic about his life, and reassures Rudy that the two of them will be fine. Meanwhile, Linda tries on attractive bowling shoes, while Bob tries to remember the details of the first time she said "I love you" to him.
275	15	"The Right Tough Stuff"	Chris Song	Rich Rinaldi	September 15, 2024	DASA14	0.77
When Gayle asks Linda to help her shoot an audition tape for a reality TV show featuring grueling physical tasks, Linda is skeptical given their aging bodies and waning physical abilities. To prevent Gayle from being featured on the show's humiliating rejection segment, she sets out to shoot a mundane video that will at least leave her safe from mockery when she is inevitably rejected. Gayle attempts to climb an abandoned bascule bridge and jump into the canal, like she did when she was a teen. She succeeds and Linda realizes that her skepticism about Gayle—and by extension herself—was her own insecurity about aging. She cheers Gayle on as she records her for the tape. Gayle ultimately doesn't make the cut, but is featured in the show's opening. Meanwhile, Bob purchases an automated meat grinder, but decides to return it when he feels the meat doesn't have the same taste as his hand-ground meat.
276	16	"To Catch a Beef"	Matthew Long	Jameel Saleem	September 22, 2024	DASA15	0.99
Sergeant Bosco asks Bob to teach him how to be a burger chef as part of an undercover assignment to apply to work in a burger restaurant front owned by dangerous jewel thief, Vincent. Bob reluctantly agrees, concerned that his family could be in danger. Bosco is distracted by the Belcher children's latest game—hiding a pickle throughout the restaurant—and learns nothing. After his interview, Bosco returns, but they are all surprised when Vincent also arrives. Bosco admits to Bob that he accidentally named Bob's Burgers as a former employer when pressed by Vincent. Teddy arrives seeking a burger, but the Belchers insist he take it to go to prevent him from blowing Bosco's cover. Vincent decides to test Bosco by having him cook for him. Knowing Bosco has learned nothing, Linda has Teddy meet her out back and swaps in the to-go burger. Vincent is pleased by his meal, hires Bosco, and leaves. Bosco receives a call saying that the police mistook Vincent for another suspect and are dropping their pursuit of him. Louise believes that Vincent is still the thief and is further convinced when the pickle disappears. Vincent, walking away, relishes in having stolen the pickle.

== Reception ==
"The Amazing Rudy" received overwhelmingly positive critical reception, with many citing it as one of the series' best episodes. Meredith Loftus of Collider called the episode "emotionally impactful", saying, "With just the second episode of this new season, 'The Amazing Rudy' champions experimentation through the perspective of a side character we've come to love. Through the new depth we discover about Rudy, this episode serves to highlight why the Belchers remain one of the most wholesome families on television. If and when this series comes to an end, don't be surprised when you see 'The Amazing Rudy' in the conversation as one of the best episodes of its run."

David Kaldor of BubbleBlabber gave the episode a 9/10, saying, "Getting a perspective episode on a character who isn't one of the Belchers is rare enough already, but giving all of the episode to Regular Sized Rudy is a big swing that I think really pays off...this episode has certainly set a high bar for the episodes to follow."

Tara Mccayley of Comic Book Resources praised the episode, saying in her article, "Though Bob's Burgers has expanded its ensemble exponentially over its 14-season run, 'The Amazing Rudy' offered a fresh deep-dive into another member of the Seymour's Bay community. The trope of highlighting a slice-of-life perspective from a minor or background character is a tried and true television tradition. However, it is not something Bob's Burgers has dealt too heavily with despite its sprawling ensemble. 'The Amazing Rudy' thus allowed a unique and welcomed deviation from the show's comfortable formulas while still commenting on the central themes of family, community, and parenthood that rest at the series' core."
