= Bob's Burgers season 12 =

Bob's Burgers
- Season 12
- Promotional poster for the twelfth season
- No. of episodes: 22

Release
- Original network: Fox
- Original release: September 26, 2021 – May 22, 2022

Season chronology
- ← Previous; Season 11 Next → Season 13

The twelfth season of the American animated television series Bob's Burgers debuted on Fox on September 26, 2021, and ended on May 22, 2022. Despite being the twelfth broadcast season of the show, production codes indicate that aside from one episode, the entire season consists of episodes from the eleventh production cycle ordered in May 2020.

== Production ==
Despite being the twelfth broadcast season, the season consists almost mostly of episodes from the eleventh production cycle - with one episode being held over from the tenth production cycle. Production of these episodes was minimally affected by lockdowns during the COVID-19 pandemic as some voice actors recorded parts from their homes in April 2020.

In December 2021, it was reported that Jay Johnston had been "banned" from his recurring role as Jimmy Pesto due to his alleged participation in the January 6 United States Capitol attack.

=== Critical reception ===
Caleb from Bubbleblabber.com gave Season 12 a positive review, praising the season premiere and first half of the season, but criticized the latter half.

== Episodes ==
No. overall	No. in season	Title	Directed by	Written by	Original release date	Prod. code	U.S. viewers (millions)
217	1	"Manic Pixie Crap Show"	Ryan Mattos	Nora Smith	September 26, 2021	AASA22	1.60
Millie blackmails Louise into getting her a bunch of collectible fairy wands from the annual Pixie Princess Promenade, an event Millie is banned from. Meanwhile, a dog-shaped floral bouquet forces Linda to confront her past.
218	2	"Crystal Mess"	Tom Riggin	Holly Schlesinger	October 3, 2021	BASA01	1.14
Mr. Frond lends Tina a crystal which his girlfriend claims has special powers. Incredibly, it seems to work, and she soon becomes a human good luck charm around the school. Meanwhile, Bob and Linda have trouble getting rid of a large amount of misshapen fruit and vegetables they bought from a farmers' market.
219	3	"The Pumpkinening"	Chris Song	Kelvin Yu	October 10, 2021	BASA02	1.77
It's Halloween season once more, and a ghost from Linda and Gayle's past resurfaces to make the holiday even spookier. Meanwhile, the kids forgo trick or treating in a vain attempt to guard the limited supply of sour candy that Bob bought at the store.
220	4	"Driving Big Dummy"	Matthew Long	Jon Schroeder	October 17, 2021	BASA03	1.17
Bob and Teddy go on a road trip to pick up a new sink for the restaurant....and drop off a gigantic ventriloquist dummy head for a collector of mini-golf sculptures. Frequent stops for food and other items show that Teddy seems to know everyone in the state. Meanwhile, Linda and the kids compete hard on a busy shift to win Employee of the Day, which carries a big ice cream prize.
221	5	"Seven-tween Again"	Simon Chong	Rich Rinaldi	October 24, 2021	BASA04	1.20
Gene is feeling the weight of his 11 years, but he finds his youthful spark at an afterschool club for kids at the community center - the fact that the other kids are all much younger than him is not a big issue. Meanwhile, Linda wants to try the fancy new hair salon that opened next door, but she's nervous of how her long-time hit-and-miss barber Gretchen may react.
222	6	"Beach, Please"	Ryan Mattos	Scott Jacobson	November 7, 2021	BASA05	1.48
The Wagstaff kids are assigned cleanup duty on the beach near Wonder Wharf by Mr. Frond, and soon rebel against this unpaid labor. Louise forges a "food and park rides for work" deal with Mr. Fischoeder over the garbage issue, but will he keep his side of the bargain? Meanwhile, Teddy has grown a mustache eerily similar to Bob's.
223	7	"Loft in Bedslation"	Matthew Long	Jameel Saleem	November 14, 2021	BASA08	1.16
A combination of an old photo that brings up unhappy memories of her condescending mom and a Tina-Louise conflict over desk access leads Linda to enlist them in a loft-bed building effort. Meanwhile, Bob's Burgers plays host to a seemingly endless "Mages and Monsters" gaming event, and Bob's unhappiness over customers' scorning his "Burger of the Day" efforts leads to him sympathizing with the uncertain, new-idea having game host.
224	8	"Stuck in the Kitchen with You"	Tom Riggin	Dan Fybel	November 21, 2021	BASA06	1.84
Bob gets roped into doing all the cooking for an old folks home Thanksgiving dinner, while the kids have to hastily improvise a holiday parade for the residents.
225	9	"FOMO You Didn't"	Simon Chong	Holly Schlesinger	November 28, 2021	BASA09	1.62
Tina is torn between doing well in a photography class and cutting class to join her friends in getting slushies and hanging out in a nearby half-demolished house. Meanwhile, Linda invites a former resident of the Belcher's home to visit and slowly comes to regret it. Also meanwhile, Louise and Gene notice that Mr. Branca is acting very oddly, and try to figure out why.
226	10	"Gene's Christmas Break"	Chris Song	Katie Crown	December 19, 2021	BASA07	1.60
Gene is upset when he accidentally breaks his favorite very rare Christmas album, so his family goes all out to save the season for him. Meanwhile, Teddy's idea for a compact neighborhood Secret Santa becomes a bit of a mess.
227	11	"Touch of Eval(uations)"	Ryan Mattos	Greg Thompson	January 9, 2022	BASA10	1.42
The teachers at Wagstaff are desperate to be nice to the students, because they are being officially evaluated by the kids. Louise swiftly gleans that this can work to the students' advantage. Meanwhile, Bob and Linda tussle with existential issues over their lack of a formal will.
228	12	"Ferry on My Wayward Bob and Linda"	Matthew Long	Scott Jacobson	February 27, 2022	BASA13	1.18
Bob and Linda's Valentine's Day gets a boost when they are invited to a swanky dinner on Kingshead Island. Meanwhile, Jen is babysitting the kids again, and Louise hatches one of her trademark plans to take candy-related advantage of their jittery carer.
229	13	"Frigate Me Knot"	Chris Song	Rich Rinaldi	March 6, 2022	BASA12	1.15
The warship Teddy served on is being decommissioned, but an embarrassing incident during his tour of duty makes him reluctant to attend the farewell ceremony. The Belchers decide to accompany him as moral support; once aboard, Bob makes a horrifying discovery - he's truly awful at tying naval knots.
230	14	"Video Killed the Gene-io Star"	Tom Riggin	Jon Schroeder	March 13, 2022	BASA11	0.95
Courtney enlists the help of Tina and Louise to convince Gene to appear in the music video of Courtney's song "Locker Love". Meanwhile, a locked briefcase left in the diner by a customer has Linda and Teddy consumed with curiosity.
231	15	"Ancient Misbehavin"	Simon Chong	Dan Fybel	March 20, 2022	BASA14	1.01
Louise, Rudy, and Millie keep missing out on clay coins given as prize tokens at their Ancient Greek History class, so they concoct a scheme to counterfeit a whole mass of them. Meanwhile, Bob finds that sleeping on the living room couch instead of in his bed is vastly better for getting a good night's rest.
232	16	"Interview with a Pop-pop-pire"	Ryan Mattos	Katie Crown	March 27, 2022	BASA15	1.05
Bob's father is coming over for dinner, and while the family wait for him to arrive they weave three fantastic tales about a key event in Bob Snr's life.
233	17	"The Spider House Rules"	Tom Riggin & Ryan Mattos	Jameel Saleem	April 10, 2022	BASA16	0.88
Louise adopts a spider, and soon discovers that keeping it around the Belcher home is a complicated matter. Meanwhile, Bob reconnects with old friends via cellphone, but finds he really doesn't care too much about the whole deal.
234	18	"Clear and Present Ginger"	Chris Song	Lizzie Molyneux-Logelin & Wendy Molyneux	April 24, 2022	BASA17	0.89
Nat recruits the Belchers for a limo racing contest, which triggers Tina's anxieties about attending prom in the future. Meanwhile, Linda plans a one-on-one girls night with her best friend, Ginger, but is conflicted when Gayle and Gretchen unexpectedly show up.
235	19	"A-Sprout a Boy"	Matthew Long	Holly Schlesinger	May 1, 2022	BASA18	1.02
Gene becomes obsessed with an old handheld game, so Bob offers to help him with a school project having to do with growing vegetables. Teddy has a salmon delivered to the restaurant and talks Linda into waiting for it. Meanwhile, Tina and Louise are sent to the grocery store, where they promptly take over a kiddie ride.
236	20	"Sauce Side Story"	Simon Chong & Tom Riggin	Steven Davis	May 8, 2022	BASA21	0.92
A deep and long-standing feud on Linda's side of the family is brought to light again on Mother's Day. To get her the ultimate present, the kids join forces with Gayle to steal back one of the things continuing to divide the relatives - a cherished family pasta sauce recipe. Meanwhile, Teddy agonises over what tattoo-related gift to get his mother.
237	21	"Some Like It Bot Part 1: Eighth Grade Runner"	Simon Chong	Loren Bouchard & Nora Smith	May 15, 2022	BASA19	1.01
When Tina's new shirt is ridiculed by Tammy and Jocelyn in a new Wagstaff News segment called "Wow or Weird," she turns to her erotic friend-fiction and writes about a futuristic world in which she is a robot on the run. Meanwhile, the family has their own conflicts; Bob and Teddy obsess over a bathroom vandal, Gene and Louise try to get boba tea, and Linda tries to figure out what to get for a depressed Tina's upcoming birthday.
238	22	"Some Like It Bot Part 2: Judge-bot Day"	Ryan Mattos	Loren Bouchard & Nora Smith	May 22, 2022	BASA20	0.93
Driven over the edge by the news segment, Tina breaks into the school to destroy the Wagstaff News touchscreen. When the family realizes what she's about to do (and how much trouble she could get in), they race to stop her. Note: This was the last episode to air before The Bob's Burgers Movie was released to theaters.

== Release ==
This season aired on Fox on Sundays as part of its Animation Domination block along with The Simpsons, The Great North, Duncanville, and Family Guy. Starting with this season, the series runs on Disney+'s Star segment in Canada, UK and Australia, where episodes premiere weekly on Wednesdays.
