= Bob's Burgers season 13 =

Bob's Burgers
- Season 13
- Promotional poster for the thirteenth season
- No. of episodes: 22

Release
- Original network: Fox
- Original release: September 25, 2022 – May 21, 2023

Season chronology
- ← Previous; Season 12 Next → Season 14

The thirteenth season of the American animated television series Bob's Burgers aired on Fox from September 25, 2022 to May 21, 2023. It is the first season to air after the movie.

== Production ==
On September 23, 2020, Bob's Burgers was renewed for its twelfth and thirteenth seasons by Fox. Beginning with this season, the opening sequence now features a sinkhole and a "grand re-re-re-re-opening" banner, referencing the events of The Bob's Burgers Movie. Despite being the thirteenth broadcast season, the season is composed mostly of episodes from the twelfth production cycle which are denoted with the production code CASAxx, with one episode being held over from the eleventh production cycle.

== Episodes ==
No. overall	No. in season	Title	Directed by	Written by	Original release date	Prod. code	U.S. viewers (millions)
239	1	"To Bob, or Not to Bob"	Chris Song	Lizzie Molyneux-Logelin & Wendy Molyneux	September 25, 2022	BASA22	1.67
Mr. Fischoeder wants his brother Felix to admit he stole a trophy from him many years ago, and enlists the Belchers to put on an adaptation of William Shakespeare's Hamlet, so as to "catch the conscience of the kin". Predictably, it's not exactly Broadway material. Meanwhile, Louise goes all out to convince her Dad that she is old enough to sharpen the diner's knives, which is currently Tina's responsibility.
240	2	"The Reeky Lake Show"	Matthew Long	Rich Rinaldi	October 2, 2022	CASA01	1.06
Linda books the Belchers for a summer vacation in a lakeside cabin, hoping to get them to forge some lasting family memories. The vacation is an immediate disaster - the lake is tainted with giardia and gigantic swarms of biting bugs fill the air. There is no water, no toilets, and sweltering heat. Bob and the kids avoid cabin fever by secretly watching a portable TV, and when Linda finds out about it she storms out of the cabin - into great peril.
241	3	"What About Job?"	Tom Riggin	Lizzie Molyneux-Logelin & Wendy Molyneux	October 9, 2022	CASA02	1.68
Louise can't decide what to pick for her preferred future job for Career Day, so her family suggests some ideas in a series of exciting and wacky stories.
242	4	"Comet-y of Errors"	Brian Loschiavo	Dan Fybel	October 16, 2022	CASA03	0.92
Teddy is deeply uncertain about his love life and destiny in general, and hopes that the return of Kirby's Comet to the skies will give him a sign from the Universe. He and the Belchers go to an official comet-watching event, where Tina goes on an apology spree, Linda searches for kettle corn, and Bob finds himself in the unlikely role of spiritual counsellor to his friend. Meanwhile, Gene and Louise stockpile huge amounts of combustible wish paper.
243	5	"So You Stink You Can Dance"	Ryan Mattos	Jon Schroeder	October 23, 2022	CASA04	1.49
Bob joins Teddy in trying to catch home run balls on his boat floating outside Wonder Wharf Stadium while Linda is left alone to manage the restaurant. Jimmy Jr takes modern dance lessons at the rec center with Spencer Blankenship, an overbearing dance instructor, and Tina and Zeke go to watch. When Bob gives up trying to catch home run balls, Linda takes his place and has much more luck.
244	6	"Apple Gore-chard! (But Not Gory)"	Chris Song	Scott Jacobson	October 30, 2022	CASA05	1.66
A school field trip to a Halloween-themed event at a local apple orchard results in Louise both suspecting sinister machinations afoot amidst the trees...and experiencing a heady brush with popularity. Meanwhile, Linda tries to keep tabs on Gene and Tina's costumes when they prove to be high-maintenance, and Bob pursues beekeeping at the orchard.
245	7	"Ready Player Gene"	Matthew Long	Jameel Saleem	November 13, 2022	CASA06	1.65
Gene's decision to spend all his savings on trying a new VR gaming arcade comes with disappointment. The games are horrible, and refunds are not on the agenda. Bob journeys into cyberspace with his son to help him cope with the letdown. Meanwhile, Louise and Tina build a towering house-of-cards out of store menus, but fear of completion becomes a problem as the structure nears the diner ceiling.
246	8	"Putts-giving"	Tom Riggin	Katie Crown	November 20, 2022	CASA07	1.09
The Belchers decide to spend Thanksgiving morning playing mini-golf. The empty course becomes a battlefield of emotions for the family, with Linda vainly chasing the thrill of a fluke hole in one, Gene and Louise trying to "hack" a mechanical Yeti hole sculpture, and Tina agonizing over how to ask her parents about an event she wishes to attend.
247	9	"Show Mama from the Grave"	Brian Loschiavo	Holly Schlesinger	November 27, 2022	CASA08	1.22
The Belchers head off to go 'snoobing', but Bob decides to make a side trip to see his mother's grave first. This leads to problems - the grave map Bob is given is impossible to read, the sun is setting fast, and the markers are buried in snow. Linda, meanwhile, remains outside the graveyard, stricken by coimetrophobia. Also meanwhile, Teddy accidentally eats forbidden meatloaf from the Belchers' fridge while doing light repairs to the house, and panics a bit.
248	10	"The Plight Before Christmas"	Chris Song	Teleplay by : Loren Bouchard; Story by : Kelvin Yu	December 11, 2022	CASA10	1.46
It's a Christmas crisis, as Bob and Linda try to do the seemingly impossible - attend all three of their kids' end-of-year talent shows, which are all happening at the same time in widely-spread locations. Can the Belcher parents pull off a Yuletide miracle?
249	11	"Cheaty Cheaty Bang Bang"	Ryan Mattos	Steven Davis	January 8, 2023	CASA09	1.35
After she believes another student has accused her of cheating during a test, Tina attempts to clear her name, but a massive snow storm traps the Belchers at home. With no working heat, Bob struggles to contact (and not accidentally insult) a repair-man, while warmth-seeking Gene and Louise perfect the art of the living room blanket fort.
250	12	"Oh Row You Didn't"	Matthew Long	Rich Rinaldi	February 19, 2023	CASA11	1.01
Quincy Cox, a man trying to row from New Zealand to Nova Scotia, visits the restaurant and has a burger that tastes so good he wants to quit his mission. When the coast guard find that his rowboat is parked illegally, Bob and Gene go to move it, but since they lack rowing experience they almost get swept out to sea.
251	13	"Stop! Or My Mom Will Sleuth!"	Tom Riggin	Dan Fybel	February 26, 2023	CASA12	0.87
When Louise is suspected by school staff of stealing a toy from a fellow student, Linda attempts to figure out the truth. Meanwhile, Bob helps Teddy design a new business card.
252	14	"These Boots Are Made for Stalking"	Brian Loschiavo	Lindsey Stoddart	March 5, 2023	CASA13	0.78
While Tina tries desperately to connect with cool teenagers who occasionally visit the restaurant, Gene and Louise face off in a strange duel - who can wear the most stinky socks as neckties at the same time?
253	15	"The Show (and Tell) Must Go On"	Ryan Mattos	Jon Schroeder	March 12, 2023	CASA14	0.84
Louise takes a risk for her last show and tell by attempting to recover a War of 1812 era cannonball from a beach cave as high tide approaches. Meanwhile, Teddy goes to great lengths to find common ground with his girlfriend by pretending to like hurling, and Gene struggles with cheese-induced constipation.
254	16	"What a (April) Fool Believes"	Matthew Long	Greg Thompson	March 19, 2023	CASA16	0.75
It's April Fools' Day and after years of pranking Bob, Mr. Fischoeder challenges Bob to prank him back (under threat of eviction if he refuses). When Bob's prank goes wrong he grows suspicious of who exactly is pranking whom. Tina, meanwhile, gets invited on a frozen yogurt date with Jimmy Jr. and wonders whether a prank awaits her.
255	17	"Crows Encounters of the Bird Kind"	Chris Song	Scott Jacobson	March 19, 2023	CASA15	0.81
Tina attempts to get a birdwatching badge for her Thundergirls sash, but runs afoul of Ranger Matthew Danko when her shortcut endangers the local birdlife. Meanwhile, Gene and Louise cajole Linda into a series of escalating dares while working at the restaurant.
256	18	"Gift Card or Buy Trying"	Tom Riggin	Jameel Saleem	April 16, 2023	CASA17	0.67
The family decides to split a $100 gift card five ways at The More Store, but have trouble deciding what to get. While there, Gene tries to avoid an annoying former friend whom he ghosted.
257	19	"Crab-solutely Fabulous"	Brian Loschiavo	Katie Crown	April 23, 2023	CASA18	0.80
When the Belcher kids put together a costumed wrestling act for the Crustacean Nation Wrestling Federation, they recruit Teddy to join them as their on-stage nemesis. But wrestling the kids turns out to be more difficult than Teddy bargained for.
258	20	"Radio No You Didn't"	Ryan Mattos	Holly Schlesinger	April 30, 2023	CASA19	0.82
The unearthing of an old radio in Bob and Linda's bedroom cupboard leads Bob to tell his family an exciting story of World War II espionage involving his grandmother.
259	21	"Mother Author Laser Pointer"	Chris Song	Lindsey Stoddart	May 14, 2023	CASA20	0.72
As the kids try to help lure Mr. Frond's cat out of a tree, Linda's anxieties over the kids one day growing up causes her to obsessively harass a famous children's book author to the point of terror.
260	22	"Amelia"	Matthew Long & Brian Loschiavo	Loren Bouchard	May 21, 2023	CASA21	0.72
Louise chooses Amelia Earhart for a multimedia project on a personal hero. Motivated by Wayne's obnoxious dismissal of Earhart's achievements, Louise grapples with what Earhart's final failed flight means for her report, for young women, and for herself. Meanwhile, Linda finds herself gifted with a surprise Mother's Day gift, but finds a deeper gift in helping Louise with her project. Note: This episode was dedicated to Paul Reubens in the re-aired syndication.
