= Bob's Burgers season 9 =

Bob's Burgers
- Season 9
- DVD cover
- No. of episodes: 22

Release
- Original network: Fox
- Original release: September 30, 2018 – May 12, 2019

Season chronology
- ← Previous; Season 8 Next → Season 10

The ninth season of the animated comedy series Bob's Burgers began airing on Fox in the United States on September 30, 2018, and concluded on May 11, 2019.

== Episodes ==
No. overall	No. in season	Title	Directed by	Written by	Original release date	Prod. code	U.S. viewers (millions)
151	1	"Just One of the Boyz 4 Now for Now"	Ian Hamilton	Lizzie Molyneux & Wendy Molyneux	September 30, 2018	8ASA06	2.47
Tina goes undercover at an audition in order to find the love of her life. Meanwhile, Teddy asks the rest of the family to look after his baby rat.
152	2	"The Taking of Funtime One Two Three"	Chris Song	Justin Hook	October 7, 2018	7ASA13	3.08
Louise and her siblings want to win a prize at the local arcade. Meanwhile, Teddy asks Bob and Linda if they could watch a chicken.
153	3	"Tweentrepreneurs"	Ryan Mattos	Greg Thompson	October 14, 2018	8ASA09	2.14
Louise and her siblings join the Tweentrepreneurs club at school. Meanwhile, Bob and Linda have to deal with a dine-and-dasher.
154	4	"Nightmare on Ocean Avenue Street"	Tyree Dillihay	Dan Fybel	October 21, 2018	8ASA07	2.80
The kids investigate a Halloween candy thief. Meanwhile, Teddy goes to war with another handyman.
155	5	"Live and Let Fly"	Chris Song	Rich Rinaldi	November 4, 2018	8ASA11	3.16
The kids learn a lesson about revenge when they want to get Mr. Frond back for embarrassing them. Meanwhile, Linda and Bob participate in a paper airplane contest.
156	6	"Bobby Driver"	Ryan Mattos	Scott Jacobson	November 11, 2018	8ASA12	2.23
Bob becomes an unwilling getaway driver for Edith. Meanwhile, the kids attend a Gatsby-themed party, and Linda helps Teddy prepare for a big date.
157	7	"I Bob Your Pardon"	Chris Song	Nora Smith	November 18, 2018	8ASA08	2.91
The Belchers try to save a turkey from the wicked Deputy Mayor.
158	8	"Roller? I Hardly Know Her!"	Kev Wotton	Lizzie Molyneux & Wendy Molyneux	November 25, 2018	8ASA13	1.97
Gene's friend Alex ditches him to roller-dance with Courtney instead. Meanwhile, Bob, Linda and Teddy have a creepy visitor at the restaurant.
159	9	"UFO No You Didn't"	Tyree Dillihay	Steven Davis	December 2, 2018	8ASA14	2.99
Tina believes that her science fair experiment allows her to communicate with aliens, but a fearful Gene and Louise undercut her work when a classmate of Tina's convinces them that any alien visitors will destroy Earth. Meanwhile, Bob accidentally spends precious funds to buy what turn out to be five miniature coatracks, and tries fruitlessly to get anyone to buy them from him.
160	10	"Better Off Sled"	Ian Hamilton	Holly Schlesinger	December 9, 2018	8ASA10	4.35
The kids get into a turf war with Logan over their favorite sledding spot. Meanwhile, Bob helps Linda knit scarves for the kids' Christmas presents, making her jealous in the process.
161	11	"Lorenzo's Oil? No, Linda's"	Chris Song	Jon Schroeder	January 6, 2019	8ASA16	2.21
Linda develops an addiction to essential oils, prompting Gayle and the kids to intervene. Meanwhile, Bob and Teddy help Mr. Higgins with a favor.
162	12	"The Helen Hunt"	Ryan Mattos	Dan Fybel	January 13, 2019	8ASA17	4.89
The Belchers make it their mission to help Teddy get his dream girl, but Tina is convinced she's found a better match for him.
163	13	"Bed, Bob & Beyond"	Ian Hamilton	Kelvin Yu	February 10, 2019	8ASA15	1.66
After a tense argument between Bob and Linda on Valentine's Day morning, the family goes to a movie that night but leave partway. Wanting to save their parents' marriage (and subtly admit they broke Gene's bed earlier), the kids tell their own version of how the film ended.
164	14	"Every Which Way but Goose"	Kev Wotton	Holly Schlesinger	February 17, 2019	8ASA18	2.18
Tina befriends a goose. Meanwhile, Linda tries to help Gretchen to find her soulmate.
165	15	"The Fresh Princ-ipal"	Tyree Dillihay	Greg Thompson	March 3, 2019	8ASA19	1.98
Things get out of hand when Louise wins a contest to be Principal for a Day. Meanwhile, Teddy attempts to help Bob when he suddenly finds himself unable to flip burgers.
166	16	"Roamin' Bob-iday"	Ian Hamilton	Lizzie Molyneux-Logelin & Wendy Molyneux	March 10, 2019	8ASA20	2.00
Bob winds up working at a local sandwich shop when the family forces him to take a day off. Meanwhile, a last-minute baby shower is thrown for a female biker.
167	17	"What About Blob?"	Chris Song	Rich Rinaldi	March 17, 2019	8ASA21	2.08
Gene convinces Tina and Louise to help him save a misunderstood plankton blob from being destroyed by a yacht club. Meanwhile, when Jimmy Pesto goes on vacation, Trev considers making a change which Bob and Linda support.
168	18	"If You Love It So Much, Why Don't You Marionette?"	Ryan Mattos	Katie Crown	March 24, 2019	8ASA22	2.03
The kids visit a marionette theater for a school field trip, and Louise gets on the theater owner's bad side. Meanwhile, Bob takes pity on a guy who's handing out flyers in front of the restaurant.
169	19	"Long Time Listener, First Time Bob"	Ian Hamilton & Kev Wotton	Scott Jacobson	April 7, 2019	8ASA23	1.76
Bob meets his personal hero - a renegade radio DJ who now works at the local bowling alley and refuses to compromise. However, the Belchers get in over their heads when they try to help him stage a comeback. Meanwhile, after a failed attempt to convince Bob to work the new "sweet potato fry" trend into the menu, Linda tries using the sweet potato surplus to make pies.
170	20	"The Gene Mile"	Tyree Dillihay	Steven Davis	April 28, 2019	8ASA24	1.84
When the kids have to run a mandatory mile for school on the same day an ice cream store is doing a promotional giveaway, they hatch an elaborate plot to sneak away. Meanwhile, Bob and Linda frantically try to secure discount tickets to a show at the Wharf Arts Center.
171	21	"P.T.A. It Ain't So"	Ian Hamilton	Kelvin Yu	May 5, 2019	8ASA25	1.58
Linda joins the PTA at school, where she finds out there's a scandal taking place. Meanwhile, Bob tries to cheer up a store owner whose parrot flew away.
172	22	"Yes Without My Zeke"	Chris Song	Jon Schroeder	May 12, 2019	8ASA26	1.48
The kids try to help their friend Zeke learn to behave so he doesn't have to go to another school, but Tina wants Jimmy Jr. to herself. Meanwhile, Bob rents out the restaurant to Randy so he can shoot a movie.
