= Bob's Burgers season 11 =

Season of television series

Bob's Burgers
- Season 11
- Promotional poster for the eleventh season
- No. of episodes: 22

Release
- Original network: Fox
- Original release: September 27, 2020 – May 23, 2021

Season chronology
- ← Previous; Season 10 Next → Season 12

The eleventh season of Bob's Burgers premiered on Fox on September 27, 2020, and ended on May 23, 2021.

== Production ==
This season featured guest appearances from Jack McBrayer, Andy Kindler, Jenny Slate, Phil LaMarr, Ken Jeong, Megan Mullally, Renée Taylor, Kevin Kline, and Bill Hader.

=== Release ===
The season premiered September 27, 2020. The season aired on Sundays as part of Fox's Animation Domination programming block, along with The Simpsons, Bless the Harts, The Great North, and Family Guy. The season is available to stream on Disney+ in Australia under the Star Content hub.

== Episodes ==
No. overall	No. in season	Title	Directed by	Written by	Original release date	Prod. code	U.S. viewers (millions)
195	1	"Dream a Little Bob of Bob"	Simon Chong	Dan Fybel	September 27, 2020	AASA01	1.77
In an attempt to find Tina's birth certificate, Bob tries to search for the key to the safe. However, he injures his back while searching through the junk in his car and has a vision of how he undercuts his own success that improves his confidence, though he never finds the key. Meanwhile, Tina and the rest of the family help her learn a hand slap song that everyone else knows except her.
196	2	"Worms of In-Rear-ment"	Chris Song	Nora Smith	October 4, 2020	9ASA23	1.12
Gene ends up infected with pinworms which causes the whole family to worry if they have picked up the disease from him, and puts their rare plans to attend a cultural event (a music show) at risk.
197	3	"Copa-Bob-bana"	Ryan Mattos	Holly Schlesinger	October 11, 2020	AASA02	1.26
Felix opens up a nightclub in a building that Calvin bought. Both of them are looking for Bob to be the chef on opening night and Bob feels that he is "cheating" on his kitchen with the club kitchen. Meanwhile, the kids use a tub as a swimming pool.
198	4	"Heartbreak Hotel-oween"	Chris Song	Rich Rinaldi	November 1, 2020	AASA04	1.90
The kids deliver a burger to a lady who tries to conjure the spirit of her dead lover, Meanwhile Bob, Teddy, and Linda head out to donate blood but Bob is rightly worried that his fear of blood and needles will not work out well for him.
199	5	"Fast Time Capsules at Wagstaff School"	Tom Riggin	Greg Thompson	November 8, 2020	AASA03	1.41
Tammy and Tina go head to head on who can have the better time capsule for Wagstaff, Louise tries to win Boyz4Now tickets, and Bob and Linda go head to head on whether rolling "r's" or whistling is more talented.
200	6	"Bob Belcher and the Terrible, Horrible, No Good, Very Bad Kids"	Matthew Long	Steven Davis	November 15, 2020	AASA05	1.79
Bob's Burgers catches on fire the night before Oceanfest, an important sales day for the restaurant, and the flattop is damaged. However, Teddy can't locate the necessary replacement part. The kids, carrying the guilt of their contributions to the fire, do their best to solve the problem. And Hugo Habercore is both a problem and solution, the latter in a rare instance.
201	7	"Diarrhea of a Poopy Kid"	Tom Riggin	Lizzie Molyneux-Logelin & Wendy Molyneux	November 22, 2020	AASA08	1.77
When Gene becomes very sick on Thanksgiving day, Bob, Tina, and Louise tell him food-based stories (that are based on famous movies such as Predator (1987), Air Force One (1997), and Armageddon (1998)) to help him feel better and get him to possibly and briefly "hate food", while keeping him quarantined in the bathroom for preventive reasons. But in reality, Gene is suffering not from the flu or a cold but from severe food poisoning because he ate spoiled chicken parmesan.
202	8	"The Terminalator II: Terminals of Endearment"	Ryan Mattos	Kelvin Yu	November 29, 2020	AASA07	1.23
The family reluctantly heads to the airport to bring Linda's annoying parents anti-itch cream (her dad Al has eczema) during their layover on the way to Ft. Lauderdale, but then they realize that if they spend a very small amount of time with Al and Gloria they can claim that as their forced annual visit and avoid seeing Al & Gloria again for well over a year. However, Al and Gloria make the experience into an ordeal anyway, and Bob confirms both his love for Linda and an understanding of why she accepts her mom and dad's awful behavior. Meanwhile, Gene and Louise are jealous that Tina got gold "pilot wings" from a flight when she was a baby and go on a determined quest to get some of those wings for themselves.
203	9	"Mommy Boy"	Simon Chong	Jon Schroeder	December 6, 2020	AASA06	1.25
When Linda starts attending business meetings on her and Gene's home Saturday spa day, Gene becomes clingy to spend time with Linda, knowing he's losing weekend time with her. Meanwhile, Louise and Tina learn to fight, but it doesn't go well for them.
204	10	"Yachty or Nice"	Chris Song	Scott Jacobson	December 13, 2020	AASA09	1.81
When the Belchers get an unexpected invitation to cater the super-rich Glencrest Yacht Club's holiday boat parade, Bob wonders if there's a catch that has the name "Jimmy Pesto" attached to it. Meanwhile, Louise has her eye on the present-loaded Santa Schooner, but Santa Teddy gets her and her siblings to examine if they're being naughty or nice about presents.
205	11	"Romancing the Beef"	Tom Riggin	Greg Thompson	February 21, 2021	AASA13	1.24
Louise convinces Bob to rebrand the restaurant as a romantic spot named "Urge" for Valentine's Day. Tina attends an anti-Valentine's Day party that turns out to be anything but.
206	12	"Die Card, or Card Trying"	Matthew Long	Katie Crown	February 28, 2021	AASA10	1.09
Fearing the Belchers are being taken off Christmas card lists for not participating, Linda takes the family on a quest to get the perfect Christmas card family photo.
207	13	"An Incon-Wheelie-ent Truth"	Simon Chong	Dan Fybel	March 7, 2021	AASA11	1.21
Bob and Linda find their past catching up with them when Wheelie Mammoth, the gigantic pachyderm soft toy their kids thought had been given away to a charity but had in fact just been dumped, surfaces at a flea market the family are visiting. Gayle (who suspects her car may not like her) is roped into a hastily improvised cover-up operation to make the lie true before the children notice.
208	14	"Mr. Lonely Farts"	Ryan Mattos	Holly Schlesinger	March 14, 2021	AASA12	1.21
When Louise joins Bob and Teddy to buy a new grill hood from a discount seller while Linda and Tina head to the discount shoe store to find a deal on second-rate footwear, everyone forgets about Gene and he's left home alone to alternate "talk" to his imaginary friend Ken and realize he might be able to function on his own to some degree. Bob and Teddy become convinced the hood seller is a murderer. A sympathetic shoe saleswoman takes pity on Linda and Tina after watching them try on a lot of shoes they'll never be able to afford.
209	15	"Sheshank Redumption"	Chris Song	Jon Schroeder	March 21, 2021	AASA14	1.05
Linda's new and highly spiced health drink diet leads to her unintentionally committing a public indecency offence of the fecal kind. A tragicomedy of errors leads to her fine being upped to jail, and Bob goes through an ordeal trying to raise the bail money.
210	16	"Y Tu Tina También"	Matthew Long	Rich Rinaldi	March 28, 2021	AASA15	1.07
It's school fair time again, and Gene and Louise are training hard on throwing skills to at last put Mr Frond smack in the dunk tank. Meanwhile, Tina is suffering crippling ennui, but is lifted out of it by an infatuation with a teenage boy - or rather, the voice of one on a decades-old Spanish language teaching cassette.
211	17	"Fingers-loose"	Simon Chong	Lizzie Molyneux-Logelin & Wendy Molyneux	April 11, 2021	AASA16	1.19
Hall monitor Tina is tasked by Mr Frond with looking into a secret craze that has swept the school. It turns out to be a covert lunchtime finger dancing 'speakeasy', run by Gene and Louise. Should she report this, or stay true to her siblings? Meanwhile, Bob and Linda try to help Teddy with his plan to smuggle a burger into a movie screening.
212	18	"Some Kind of Fender Benderful"	Ryan Mattos	Kelvin Yu	April 18, 2021	AASA17	1.05
Bob is involved in a very minor multiple-vehicle fender bender, and nobody's sure who is to blame. Each driver could be at fault. Teddy warns that alliances will be formed among the participants and stories agreed upon, and is proved right as the crisis unfolds.
213	19	"Bridge Over Troubled Rudy"	Chris Song	Scott Jacobson	May 2, 2021	AASA19	0.95
The kids embark on a mission to transport a dangerous explosive-rigged vintage bridge-buster toy from Rudy's home to where he is spending a two week break. Louise's main motive for this hazardous quest - to see the toy blow up - is mixed up with guilt over insulting her asthmatic pal. Meanwhile, Bob finds inner peace when Mort gives him, Linda and Teddy lessons in meditation. Jimmy Pesto soon decides he will meditate too, sparking a "calm-off".
214	20	"Steal Magazine-olias"	Matthew Long	Katie Crown	May 9, 2021	AASA20	1.11
Gene steals a magazine from Dr Yap's waiting room to preserve the results of a puzzle game win over Louise. The dentist detects the theft, knows who is to blame, and will not let it go. Meanwhile, Bob and Teddy contend with a truly huge guano deposit on the restaurant's window.
215	21	"Tell Me Dumb Thing Good"	Simon Chong	Dan Fybel	May 16, 2021	AASA21	1.08
As Bob fixates on a cucumber growing blog, Linda and the kids face a dilemma over allowing a soft pretzel franchise to open in their neighbourhood, or continuing to dress up a trash can outside the proposed store site in a variety of themed costumes.
216	22	"Vampire Disco Death Dance"	Tom Riggin	Steven Davis	May 23, 2021	AASA18	0.98
As Linda, Gene and Louise prepare a pop up restaurant for the raccoons in the alley behind the diner, Bob has to deal with his much-anticipated father-daughter moment with Tina over an R-rated Rocky Horror type musical movie being impacted by the unwelcome addition to the viewing party of Zeke, Jimmy Jr., Tammy, and Jocelyn.
