= Just One of the Boyz 4 Now for Now =

- Bob's Burgers episode
- Episode no.: Season 9 Episode 1
- Directed by: Ian Hamilton
- Written by: Lizzie Molyneux; Wendy Molyneux
- Production code: 8ASA06
- Original air date: September 30, 2018

Guest appearances
- Max Greenfield as Boo Boo; Rory O'Malley as Chad; Josh Gad as Damon; Andrew Rannells as Hayden; Daveed Diggs as Jesse

Episode chronology
← Previous "Something Old, Something New, Something Bob Caters for You"	Next → "The Taking of Funtime One Two Three"
- Bob's Burgers season 9

"Just One of the Boyz 4 Now for Now" is the premiere episode of the ninth season of the American animated comedy series Bob's Burgers and the 150th episode overall. It first aired on the Fox network in the United States on September 30, 2018. It was written by Lizzie and Wendy Molyneux and directed by Ian Hamilton.

== Plot ==
A news report on the band "Boyz 4 Now" shows that they are having auditions for a fourth member after a new album sells poorly. While Tina Belcher is taking napkins out of the car, she bumps into Damon, a boy going to the tryouts, and says it is love at first sight. She decides to dress as a boy to meet him again at the tryouts since girls are not allowed to go to them. She struggles to keep focus due to other boys at the tryouts, so she hides in the bathroom, but starts fantasizing about Chad who is also hiding in the bathroom.

She makes up reasons to cut people in line, fantasizes about a boy who will not let her cut him, and runs past several people in line when people are distracted when another girl is caught. When she makes it to Damon, she starts fantasizing about his friend, then realizes that she does not love Damon because of all the boys she fantasized about. She is caught by security, and when watching the band reveal the new member after her family comes to pick her up, it is revealed that the "new" member is Boo Boo after his attempt of being a solo singer failed.

Teddy comes into the restaurant with a baby rat, asking them to watch it for a couple of hours. While watching over the rat, Hugo comes into the restaurant to buy water and hears the rat squeal. After a brief investigation and Bob hiding the rat in his underwear, they get Hugo to leave.

== Reception ==
Brianna Wellen of The A.V. Club gave this episode a B−, stating, "It's a little upsetting that the premiere would neglect so many members of the Belcher family, and yet Tina is the perfect outlet for what the show is about: the Belchers are overly confident while also questioning every move they make and ultimately find themselves in the middle of a story. That's where Tina ends up while trying to join her favorite boy band, and it's a shame that there wasn't anyone else along for the ride."

The episode was watched by 2.47 million people.

On December 6, 2018, it was announced that Lizzie and Wendy Molyneux had been nominated in the animation category for the 2019 Writer's Guild Awards for writing this episode.

On July 16, 2019, it was announced that this episode had been nominated for the Primetime Emmy Award for Outstanding Animated Program at the 71st Primetime Emmy Awards, giving the show its eighth consecutive nomination in that category. It later lost out to The Simpsons' Season 31 episode "Mad About the Toy".
