= Bob's Burgers season 8 =

Bob's Burgers
- Season 8
- DVD cover
- No. of episodes: 21

Release
- Original network: Fox
- Original release: October 1, 2017 – May 20, 2018

Season chronology
- ← Previous; Season 7 Next → Season 9

The eighth season of the animated comedy series Bob's Burgers began airing on Fox in the United States on October 1, 2017, and concluded on May 20, 2018.

On October 7, 2015, the series was renewed for an eighth production cycle, which premiered during the eighth broadcast season. The first episode "Brunchsquatch" was created with over 60 artists who are fans of the show and features a number of animation styles.

The season features guest appearances from Adam Driver, Jack McBrayer, Thomas Middleditch and Fred Savage.

== Episodes ==
No. overall	No. in season	Title	Directed by	Written by	Original release date	Prod. code	U.S. viewers (millions)
130	1	"Brunchsquatch"	Mauricio Pardo & Ian Hamilton	Lizzie Molyneux & Wendy Molyneux	October 1, 2017	7ASA14	2.93
In this episode inspired by actual fan-art of the Bob's Burgers characters, the Belcher kids want a dog, but Bob and Linda refuse. After seeing Jimmy Pesto serve brunch at his restaurant, Bob decides to do the same thing at Bob's Burgers, but Linda overdoes it with the serving of the mimosas. Meanwhile, the kids hide Felix from Mr. Fischoeder.
131	2	"The Silence of the Louise"	Chris Song	Greg Thompson	October 15, 2017	7ASA09	2.43
Louise teams up with the psychotic Millie to find out who mutilated Mr. Frond's therapy dolls. Meanwhile, Teddy attempts to make an inspirational poster.
132	3	"The Wolf of Wharf Street"	Mauricio Pardo	Lizzie Molyneux & Wendy Molyneux	October 22, 2017	7ASA07	3.02
On Halloween, Linda takes the kids out to search for a wolf that may have been scaring the townspeople. Meanwhile, an injured Bob thinks that Teddy might be a werewolf.
133	4	"Sit Me Baby One More Time"	Brian Loschiavo	Nora Smith	November 5, 2017	7ASA08	2.89
Tina's babysitting business gets derailed when her longtime nemesis, Tammy, is forced to work with her. Meanwhile, the other Belchers have dinner at a restaurant known for its burgers.
134	5	"Thanks-hoarding"	Tyree Dillihay	Jon Schroeder	November 19, 2017	7ASA15	2.37
The Belchers agree to help out Teddy after his family announces that they will be coming over for Thanksgiving. During the preparation, the Belchers discover that Teddy is secretly a hoarder.
135	6	"The Bleakening"	Brian Loschiavo	Steven Davis	December 10, 2017	7ASA16	3.17
136	7	"The Bleakening"	Chris Song	Kelvin Yu	December 10, 2017	7ASA17	3.17
In this hour-long Christmas episode, Linda decides to throw a festive party at the restaurant, but someone steals Linda's Christmas tree and her ornaments. The kids suspect it might be a character from a folk tale told to them by Teddy.
137	8	"V for Valentine-detta"	Ian Hamilton	Lizzie Molyneux & Wendy Molyneux	January 14, 2018	7ASA22	4.76
On Valentine's Day, Tina gets her heart broken, so Linda and Louise attempt to cheer her up by taking her on a girls' night out. Meanwhile, Bob and Gene become closer than ever when they attempt to perform a trapeze act.
138	9	"Y Tu Ga-Ga Tambien"	Brian Loschiavo	Scott Jacobson	March 11, 2018	7ASA12	1.84
Gene disapproves of a new playground game, which throws the school into chaos. Meanwhile, Linda develops a storyteller persona when she fills in at the local library.
139	10	"The Secret Ceramics Room of Secrets"	Tyree Dillihay	Dan Fybel	March 18, 2018	7ASA19	1.72
The kids set out to find a secret ceramics room in their school, after Linda tells them to make their own gifts for her mother's birthday. Meanwhile, Teddy moves his phone repair service into the restaurant, much to Bob's annoyance.
140	11	"Sleeping with the Frenemy"	Brian Loschiavo	Greg Thompson	March 25, 2018	7ASA20	1.74
Tina sets Tammy up with Brett, a boy from out of town, after she allows Tammy to stay with the Belchers during Spring Break. Meanwhile, Gene loses his last baby tooth, so he and Bob enlist Dr. Yap's help in finding a replacement to complete Linda's teeth collection.
141	12	"The Hurt Soccer"	Damon Wong	Rachel Hastings	April 1, 2018	7ASA23	1.54
After forgetting that they signed up Louise for a soccer league, the Belchers must help her prepare to play in the season's last game. Meanwhile, Linda and Gene seize an opportunity to turn the restaurant into a piano bar.
142	13	"Cheer Up, Sleepy Gene"	Tyree Dillihay	Teleplay by : Holly Schlesinger; Story by : H. Jon Benjamin & Holly Schlesinger	April 8, 2018	7ASA10	1.74
Gene gets invited to his first sleepover, and things do not go as planned. Meanwhile, Bob and Linda record themselves while sleeping to prove who snores more.
143	14	"The Trouble with Doubles"	Ian Hamilton	Holly Schlesinger	April 15, 2018	7ASA18	1.83
When Bob and Linda go on a double date with another couple, they all end up getting trapped in an escape room. Meanwhile, at the Belcher house, Louise hosts a zombie movie night, and Tina has to take charge when everyone else gets scared of the zombies.
144	15	"Go Tina on the Mountain"	Tyree Dillihay	Rich Rinaldi	April 22, 2018	8ASA01	1.66
The kids, at Tina's suggestion, go on a team building field trip, but, due to the rain, it does not turn out as Tina thought it would be. Meanwhile, with no kids in the house, Bob and Linda attempt to recapture their romantic spark, but end up falling asleep.
145	16	"Are You There Bob? It's Me, Birthday"	Tyree Dillihay	Kelvin Yu	April 29, 2018	8ASA04	1.91
The family forgets Bob's birthday, and attempt to make it up to him with a surprise party. Hugo and Ron distract Bob by taking him with them on their health inspection run.
146	17	"Boywatch"	Mauricio Pardo	Rich Rinaldi	May 6, 2018	7ASA11	1.56
Tina signs up to be a junior lifeguard just to meet boys. Meanwhile, Bob and Linda decide to allow their customers to use their Wi-Fi, but Sgt. Bosco does an undercover sting operation to find a hacker in their restaurant.
147	18	"As I Walk Through the Alley of the Shadow of Ramps"	Chris Song	Scott Jacobson	May 13, 2018	8ASA02	1.56
Louise starts a turf war with a crazy food truck driver. Meanwhile, Linda keeps discouraging Gayle from quitting her new job.
148	19	"Mo Mommy, Mo Problems"	Ian Hamilton	Steven Davis	May 13, 2018	8ASA03	1.88
On Mother’s Day, Linda convinces the family to attend open houses for free food, but starts to feel bad when she realizes she’s cheating the newly mothered realtor. Meanwhile, the kids discover an old woman upset about her son trying to sell her house.
149	20	"Mission Impos-slug-ble"	Chris Song	Nora Smith	May 20, 2018	7ASA21	1.65
After Tina snitches on Louise and gets her trading cards confiscated by Ms. LaBonz, the kids sneak to her house to reobtain them.
150	21	"Something Old, Something New, Something Bob Caters for You"	Chris Song	Jon Schroeder	May 20, 2018	8ASA05	1.62
A couple who met at the restaurant asks Bob to cater for their wedding, but everything goes wrong. Meanwhile, Linda is shocked the couple is marrying after only three months, and the kids have a photobombing contest.: This is the show's 150th episode.
