= The Bleakening =

- Bob's Burgers episodes
- Episode nos.: Season 8 Episodes 6 & 7
- Directed by: Part 1: Brian Loschiavo; Part 2: Chris Song
- Written by: Part 1: Steven Davis; Part 2: Kelvin Yu
- Production codes: 7ASA16 & 7ASA17
- Original air date: December 10, 2017
- Running time: 43:47

Guest appearances
- Gary Cole as Sergeant Bosco; Pamela Adlon as Olsen Benner; Adam Driver as Art; Sam Seder as Harold; Jay Johnston as Jimmy Pesto; David Herman as Marshmallow & Trev; Jack McBrayer as Marbles; John Early as Dalton Crespin; Todrick Hall as Miss Triple X-Mas; Andy Kindler as Mort; Matt Berninger as singer

Episode chronology
← Previous "Thanks-Hoarding"	Next → "V for Valentine-detta"
- Bob's Burgers season 8

"The Bleakening" is a two-part Christmas episode for the eighth season of the American animated television series Bob's Burgers. The first part is the sixth episode of the season and the 135th overall and was directed by Brian Loschiavo and written by Steven Davis. The second part is the season's seventh episode and the 136th overall and was directed by Chris Song and written by Kelvin Yu. Guest voices are Gary Cole as Sergeant Bosco, Pamela Adlon as Olsen Benner, Adam Driver as Art the artist, Sam Seder as Harold, Jay Johnston as Jimmy Pesto, David Herman as both Marshmallow and Trev, Jack McBrayer as Marbles, John Early as Dalton Crespin, Todrick Hall as Miss Triple X-Mas, Andy Kindler as Mort, and Matt Berninger as a singer. It first aired on Fox on December 10, 2017. In this episode, the Belcher family tries to find the thief of the top of their Christmas tree.

== Plot ==
Linda Belcher has a dream about a Christmas party and decides to throw one in the family restaurant together with her husband Bob. When she hears that the town's gay nightclub has been closed for legal reasons, she cuts off the top of the family's Christmas tree, puts the ornaments her children have made on it, and places it as a little tree in the restaurant for the party. During the party, Teddy tells the children about a creature named the Bleaken who is said to steal the Christmas presents from bad children and take them to his lair.

After Linda notices that her tree top was stolen, she calls the police. When Sergeant Bosco tells them that a lot of Christmas decorations have been stolen and he has no lead, Linda and Bob interrogate all the guests but cannot figure out who did it. Their daughter Louise believes that the Bleaken is the thief, so she and her siblings, Tina and Gene try to track it down. At the police station, they find a map of the town with the crime scenes of the thief marked on it. Louise takes a photo of the map with Tina's emergency cell phone. She later finds a pattern on the photo and triangulates the place she thinks is Bleaken's lair.

After Christmas Eve dinner, the kids sneak out of the apartment to go to the Bleaken's lair, which turns out to be an abandoned warehouse in a sketchy part of town. Tina, regretting sneaking out and scared by the warehouse's creepy atmosphere, calls their parents, pretending it was an accidental butt-dial, and gives them the kids' location. Outside of the warehouse, they find an ornament Gene made and some black feathers in the snow, as well as large footprints. They find a hidden door and go downstairs, where they reach a dead end. Bob and Linda arrive and the family decides to look for the thief together. Louise and Bob lift the staircase to investigate strange noises they hear coming from behind it and find another staircase hidden underneath. Despite Bob's reluctance, the family decides to go downstairs and for a brief moment, they see a creature that looks like the Bleaken. Behind a door, they discover a Christmas rave and all the stolen decorations, including the tree top. Linda confronts the ravers, bashing them for stealing other people's Christmas decorations and her Christmas spirit. The ravers, after a performance by Miss Triple X-Mas, tell her that it is the replacement location for the closed nightclub and they do not have permission for it, which is the reason for the hidden door and staircase.

Linda tells the guests that she called the police and that she now regrets it, and Art the artist confesses that he stole all the decorations for the rave. When the police arrive, Bob borrows a Bleaken costume from the man the kids had thought to be the monster earlier and lures the officers away so that the rave is not shut down. He then hides with Teddy in an inflatable Santa Claus where Teddy has been waiting all night to try and apprehend the thief. The next morning, the tree top is reattached to the family's Christmas tree and Linda's Christmas spirit returns in full force.

== Reception ==
Brianna Wellen of the A.V. Club gave the episode an "A" and wrote that it "highlights a lot of the similarities between Linda and Louise. Both are hard-headed and somewhat selfish, stopping at nothing to get what they’re looking for. In this case, the goal is the same even if the journey is different. Linda goes about finding her stoken [sic] tree and ornaments like a standard detective, searching for clues and interviewing suspects, all while keeping clever quips going. Louise embarks on a dark adventure, in total search and destroy mode." She also wrote that "the Belchers find themselves in a seriously dangerous and frightening situation. There is no reason that Bob and Linda should let the kids continue on in a dark warehouse potentially inhabited by a mystical anti-Santa. In fact, once they realize that the warehouse is actually just a location for a secret Christmas rave, there’s potentially even less reason for three middle-schoolers to stick around. But it’s having the cheesy Christmas special family moments in those settings that takes the sap out of the moment and makes the Belcher [sic] feel even more like a real family, flaws and all."
