= The Hormone-iums =

- Bob's Burgers episode
- Episode no.: Season 6 Episode 14
- Directed by: Chris Song
- Written by: Lizzie Molyneux; Wendy Molyneux
- Production code: 6ASA04
- Original air date: April 17, 2016

Guest appearances
- Aziz Ansari as Darryl; Zach Galifianakis as Felix

Episode chronology
← Previous "Wag the Hog"	Next → "Pro Tiki/Con Tiki"
- Bob's Burgers season 6

"The Hormone-iums" is the 14th episode of the sixth season of the animated comedy series Bob's Burgers and the overall 102nd episode, and is written by Lizzie Molyneux and Wendy Molyneux and directed by Chris Song. It aired on Fox in the United States on April 17, 2016. In the episode, Tina gets her chance to be soloist of the Hormone-iums in a play, but realizes the role could end up ruining her social status. Meanwhile, Linda comes up with a business plan that she thinks will make the Belchers rich.

== Plot ==
Tina is part of a student chorus called "The Hormone-iums" and she wants a chance to sing solo. After a performance in the cafeteria where lead singer, Angela, faints mid-song, Tina is temporarily given the lead singer part until Angela recovers from mononucleosis. The Hormone-iums are given a special show to perform on Friday, all about mono, and during the rehearsal Tina finds herself disagreeing with Mr. Frond's alarmist lyrics. She says kissing isn't dangerous and people don't usually die from mono but Mr. Frond refuses to listen to her.

Every student sees a clip of Tina singing about hating kissing on the Wagstaff school news channel and she's soon uninvited from Jocelyn's spin-the-bottle birthday party because they don't want someone who hates kissing there. Though Tina loves kissing and initially wants to quit The Hormone-iums, Mr. Frond bribes her with a permanent lead singer role. She is conflicted and sad until she speaks with her dad who tells her she's the one in charge of her mouth - who she kisses with it and what she says with it. In the end, she refuses to sing the song during the performance, instead advocating smart kissing and not promoting misinformation. Tina gets re-invited to the birthday party.

Meanwhile, Linda sells items from the lost and found box, managing to sell a large-sized woman's platform heel as a decorative wine bottle holder. Gretchen, the person who bought it, asks for more shoes for her hairdresser friends and after finding out how expensive that heel was, Linda gives up. Louise convinces her to pitch the wine shoe idea to Mr. Fischoeder and his brother, Felix, who pass on the Cinderella-inspired presentation. Later, Linda finds out the novelty wine shoe was already something being sold for 5 years and is consoled by the fact that her idea was marketable.

== Reception ==
Alasdair Wilkins of The A.V. Club gave the episode a B+, he explained his rating by saying, "The episode is judicious in how it has the other Belchers intersect with Tina’s story, bringing in Bob for some endearingly plausible emotional support just at the moment Tina needs it most. Beyond that, though, the episode has a lot of trust that Tina is strong enough, both in and out of universe, to carry a story all by herself. The fact that Tina can be exactly that is now the most normal thing in the world is the greatest achievement on display tonight, even if it was first accomplished long before this."

The episode received a 1.0 rating and was watched by a total of 2.18 million people.
