= The Gene Mile =

- Bob's Burgers episode
- Episode no.: Season 9 Episode 20
- Directed by: Tyree Dillihay
- Written by: Steven Davis
- Production code: 8ASA24
- Original air date: April 28, 2019

Guest appearances
- David Herman as Mr. Frond / announcer; John Michael Higgins as Doug Wheeler; David Wain as Courtney Wheeler; Brian Huskey as Regular Sized Rudy / customer; Thomas Middleditch as Alex Papasian

Episode chronology
← Previous "Long Time Listener, First Time Bob"	Next → "P.T.A. It Ain't So"
- Bob's Burgers season 9

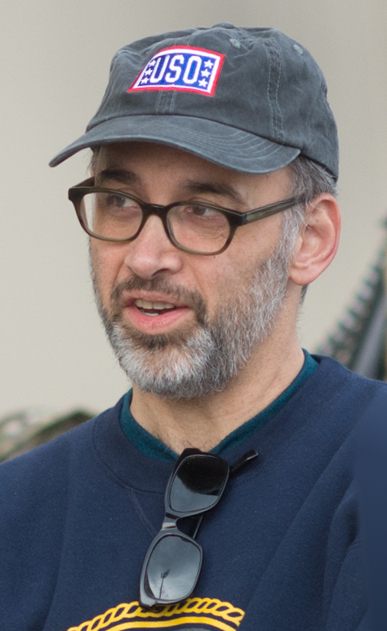
David Wain voices Courtney Wheeler

"The Gene Mile" is the 20th episode of the ninth season of the American animated comedy series Bob's Burgers and the 170th episode overall. It first aired on the Fox network in the United States on April 28, 2019. It was written by Steven Davis and directed by Tyree Dillihay; its guest voices are David Herman as Mr. Frond and an announcer, John Michael Higgins as Doug Wheeler, David Wain as Courtney Wheeler, Brian Huskey as Regular Sized Rudy and a costumer, and Thomas Middleditch as Alex Papasian. In this episode, the Wagstaff School students participate in a mandatory mile run while some of them escape from it on bicycles to get free ice cream. Meanwhile, Bob and Linda try to get discount tickets for the Wharf Art Center.

== Plot ==
At school, it is announced that all students of grades four to eight have to participate in a mile run on Friday which is also free ice cream day at a local parlor. Louise Belcher (Kristen Schaal) comes up with a plan to cut the run by bike riding to the ice cream shop. Courtney Wheeler has the idea of tracking the slowest runner – Large Tommy – by using a cat's collar with a built-in GPS tracker and an app on her cell phone. Louise, her brother Gene (Eugene Mirman), Regular Sized Rudy, Courtney and Alex Papasian agree to hide their bikes in some bushes near the school building.

On Friday, the five children bike ride to school and stash their bicycles. They put the collar in Tommy's hydration pack before starting to run. Once out of sight of the teachers, they fetch their bikes and ride to the ice cream parlor. Mr Frond spots Gene after his bike chain comes off, and makes Gene run the whole mile next to Large Tommy. Louise, Rudy, Alex and Courtney arrive at the ice cream shop and get one free cone each. Louise decides to give Gene a cone made of their leftovers and carries it while they are riding back. After she gives her brother his cone, Courtney's father Doug stops him and Tommy because he located the collar and thinks his cat is in Tommy's backpack. Courtney convinces him that the cat is at home but Mr. Frond catches the four cycling students and says that they actually have to run the full mile on Saturday while Gene and Tommy finish their run.

At the restaurant, Bob (H. Jon Benjamin) and his wife Linda (John Roberts) call the Wharf Art Center in order to buy discount tickets for a show named Cake 2. Their regular customer Teddy (Larry Murphy) tries to help them and later manages to get two tickets.

== Reception ==
Alasdair Wilkins from the A.V. Club marked the episode with a "B+", saying it works well "that Gene doesn't really make any choices once Mr. Frond catches him and forces him back into the race. He's got to run, so he runs, and he would have stopped if Large Tommy hadn't convinced him that stopping at all would spell catastrophe. He does absolutely end up deciding for himself that he wants to finish the race, but this isn't something the episode has to dig deep inside Gene to justify. Instead, he just goes with the flow long enough that he then realizes he wants to keep doing it, even if that means delaying ice cream or getting back up after Mr. Wheeler stood in his and Tommy's way or just generally trying hard at something for once." He also wrote that "one of the basic building blocks of comedy is surprise. It's not easy for Bob's Burgers to manage that so deep into its run, but this is where all the subtle tweaks to the established status quo offer great little opportunities for gags. Louise is still riding an adult's bike at long last, and she's still way too self-consciously proud of her every little accomplishment, to the point that even Rudy comments on it."

Steven Davis received a nomination for the Writers Guild of America Award for Outstanding Writing in Animation at the 72nd Writers Guild of America Awards for his script to this episode.
