= Bob's Burgers =

American animated sitcom

- Genre: Adult animation; Animated sitcom
- Created by: Loren Bouchard
- Developed by: Loren Bouchard; Jim Dauterive
- Showrunners: Loren Bouchard; Jim Dauterive (seasons 1–10); Nora Smith (season 11–present); Holly Schlesinger (season 15–present)
- Voices of: H. Jon Benjamin; Dan Mintz; Eugene Mirman; Larry Murphy; John Roberts; Kristen Schaal
- Theme music composer: Loren Bouchard
- Opening theme: "Bob's Burgers Theme"
- Composers: John Dylan Keith; Loren Bouchard; Elegant Too
- Country of origin: United States
- Original language: English
- No. of seasons: 16
- No. of episodes: 313 (list of episodes)

Production
- Executive producers: Loren Bouchard; Jim Dauterive; Nora Smith; Dan Fybel; Rich Rinaldi; Jon Schroeder; Steven Davis; Scott Jacobson; Holly Schlesinger; Lizzie Molyneux-Logelin & Wendy Molyneux; Kelvin Yu
- Producer: Bernard Derriman
- Editor: Mark Seymour
- Camera setup: Animated rendition of single-camera
- Running time: 20–23 minutes
- Production companies: 20th Television (Note: Known as 20th Century Fox Television from seasons 1–10; animation outsourced to Hanho Heung-Up.) (seasons 1–11); Wilo Productions (season 2–present); Buck & Millie Productions (seasons 2–10); 20th Television Animation (season 12–present)

Original release
- Network: Fox
- Release: January 9, 2011 – present

Related
- The Bob's Burgers Movie; Central Park; The Great North

Bob's Burgers is an American animated sitcom created by Loren Bouchard for the Fox Broadcasting Company. It is centered on the Belcher family – parents Bob and Linda and their three children, Tina, Gene, and Louise – who run a burger restaurant in New Jersey and often go on adventures of many kinds. The show premiered on January 9, 2011. The series was conceived by Bouchard after he developed Home Movies. Bob's Burgers is produced by Wilo Productions and Buck & Millie Productions in association with 20th Television Animation. The series is animated by Bento Box Entertainment.

While reviews for the first season were mixed, feedback for subsequent seasons has been more positive. The series premiere, "Human Flesh", drew in 9.39 million viewers, making it the highest-rated series premiere of the season and finishing ninth in the ratings for the week it aired. Since then, the series has grown to be a critical and cultural success. In 2013, TV Guide ranked Bob's Burgers as one of the 60 Greatest TV Cartoons of All Time. The series has been nominated for several awards, including the Emmy Award for Outstanding Animated Program fifteen consecutive times (2012–2026), winning in 2014 and 2017. Reruns began airing on Cartoon Network's programming blocks Adult Swim in June 2013, and ACME Night from 2021 to 2023, and began airing in syndication on local stations in September 2015.

A feature film was released in theaters in May 2022. A comic book series based on the series, published by Dynamite Entertainment, began in September 2014. A soundtrack album was released on Sub Pop Records in May 2017, with a second volume released in August 2021.

In April 2025, it was announced that Bob's Burgers would be renewed for four more seasons in what is considered a "mega deal" with Disney Television Studios. This renewal will take the show through the 2028–29 television season.

== Premise ==
Bob's Burgers centers around the Belcher family, a blue-collar family consisting of Bob Belcher, his wife Linda, and their three children, Tina, Gene, and Louise. The Belchers run the titular hamburger restaurant in the fictional shore town of Seymour's Bay, New Jersey.

The restaurant is located on Ocean Avenue in a slightly neon-green, two-story building sandwiched between two other commercial buildings, one of which houses a funeral home and crematorium whose owner, Mort, is one of the restaurant's regulars. Their other most loyal customer, Teddy, is a sweet-natured but somewhat dense handyman who considers Bob and Linda his closest friends. Bob's business and personal rival is Jimmy Pesto, who runs Jimmy Pesto's Pizzeria, an Italian restaurant located directly across the street. The building to the right of the restaurant is typically vacant, though the opening credits depict a different, wittily named business inhabiting the space in every episode. On very few occasions, the store has stayed part of the episode.

All three Belcher children work part-time in the restaurant – unpaid – and attend Wagstaff School, run by Principal Spoors. Thirteen-year-old Tina, in the throes of puberty, struggles with her obsession with boys, particularly Pesto's aloof son Jimmy Junior. Eleven-year-old Gene strives to be a musician, very often carrying a keyboard and noodling with it. Nine-year-old Louise is the scheming troublemaker, seeking revenge, riches, or adventure, often dragging her siblings along; she puts on a face of fearlessness but is still afraid of some things (such as the dentist or being without her pink rabbit-eared hat). Gene and Louise usually spend their free time together, while socially awkward Tina tries (often unsuccessfully) to get involved in more adult pursuits.

Episodes typically follow the family's experiences running the restaurant and interacting with the eccentric members of their community, though some episodes feature them outside of their usual setting of the restaurant. Many episodes contain musical numbers, either in fantasy sequences, as diegetic music, or over the episode's closing credits.

== Episodes ==
Season	Episodes	Originally released	
Season	Episodes	First released	Last released
1	13	January 9, 2011	May 22, 2011
2	9	March 11, 2012	May 20, 2012
3	23	September 30, 2012	May 12, 2013
4	22	September 29, 2013	May 18, 2014
5	21	October 5, 2014	May 17, 2015
6	19	September 27, 2015	May 22, 2016
7	22	September 25, 2016	June 11, 2017
8	21	October 1, 2017	May 20, 2018
9	22	September 30, 2018	May 12, 2019
10	22	September 29, 2019	May 17, 2020
11	22	September 27, 2020	May 23, 2021
12	22	September 26, 2021	May 22, 2022
13	22	September 25, 2022	May 21, 2023
14	16	October 1, 2023	September 22, 2024
15	22	September 29, 2024	August 14, 2025
16	15	September 28, 2025	May 17, 2026

== Characters ==
The Belcher family. Gene, Louise, and Tina (Left to right, front row) Linda, Bob, and Teddy (Left to right, back row).

- Bob Belcher (H. Jon Benjamin) is the owner of Bob's Burgers. He is Linda's husband and Tina, Gene, and Louise's father. He is 46 years old and has black hair with male pattern baldness and a thick mustache. Bob's youth mostly consisted of working in his father's diner after his mother died, before he left to start Bob's Burgers against his father's wishes. Bob typically serves as the straight man to the antics of his family and friends, though he is also quite stubborn and is prone to being very petty and competitive, especially against people he dislikes. Despite his pessimistic personality, Bob loves and cares for his family and his restaurant, and tries to do what is best for them. He enjoys cooking, restaurant appliances, foreign films, and Thanksgiving. In the restaurant, Bob is the cook.
- Linda Belcher (John Roberts) is Bob's wife and Tina, Gene, and Louise's mother. She is 44 years old, always wears her signature red glasses, and speaks with a thick, heavily-pronounced New Jersey/New York accent. Linda is quirky, happy-go-lucky, and enthusiastic in whatever she does, to the point of sometimes bursting into made-up songs about everyday things, serving as a foil to Bob. She is very supportive of her family and her children's schemes, and provides advice or assistance where she can, though she can be strict as well, showing less leniency when Louise does not listen to her. Linda frequently winds up in comedic situations trying to prove herself to be a loving wife and mother. In the restaurant, Linda is the cashier and clerk.
- Tina Belcher (Dan Mintz) is the eldest of the Belcher children, at 13 years old. She has myopia and relies on her distinctive large glasses for sight. Tina is socially awkward, insecure, easily influenced by peer pressure, and tends to freeze up and produce a long groaning sound when faced with decisions or conflict, but she is also capable of showing courage and taking responsibility when she has to. She is often assigned caretaker for Gene and Louise when they are home alone, though they frequently take advantage of her naivety to bring her along in their plans. Tina is going through puberty and has many crushes on many boys, primarily Jimmy Jr., one of her classmates and the son of Bob's rival Jimmy Pesto. She has some sort of fetish for butts and zombies, reflected in the fan fiction and "erotic friend-fiction" she tends to write. Tina obsesses over what others think of her and struggles to fit in with her friend group at school, consisting of Jimmy Jr., Zeke, Tammy, and Jocelyn. She is interested in horses, the fictional tv show The Equestranauts, and the popular boy band Boyz4Now. In the restaurant, Tina is a server, but is not good with customers.
- Gene Belcher (Eugene Mirman) is the middle child and only son of the Belcher family, at 11 years old. Gene is confident, laid-back, enthusiastic, and loud, like Linda, though he also resembles Bob when he was young. In many cases Gene serves as comic relief, often by making double entendres or cultural references. He is the least mature out of his siblings, being distracted often (called "Gene-ing out" within the family), exhibiting poor hygiene, and playing make believe often, though he can also show resolve and do what is right. He is open to conversation and has many friends in school, including Alex, Courtney, Lenny, and Peter. Gene is an aspiring musician and often plays with his sampling keyboard and megaphone while dabbling in writing songs and musicals on various topics. Besides music, he also enjoys fashion in which he occasionally cross-dresses without judgment from his family or neighbors. In the restaurant, Gene advertises out front in a burger costume, but often also works as a server.
- Louise Belcher (Kristen Schaal) is the youngest of the Belcher children, at 9 years old. She always wears a distinctive pink hat with long bunny ears that she has had since preschool. She is a mischievous schemer with an egotistical and cynical personality who is experienced in manipulating others to get her way, but in many cases her conscience intervenes and she becomes a reluctant antihero who ultimately does what is right, though she tries to hide her honest feelings. Amongst the siblings, she takes leadership and authority, and often challenges traditional gender roles with her assertive, intense nature. She strongly cares for her family (particularly Bob), and plans to take over the family business when she gets older, but is also willing to take advantage of her family when it suits her. Her friends at school include Regular-Sized Rudy, Darryl, Andy and Ollie, and (mostly one-sidedly) Millie. Louise enjoys Burobu, a Pokémon-like collectible card game, as well as Boyz4Now member Boo Boo, though she strongly represses her interest in the latter. In the restaurant, Louise is often a server but mostly helps her siblings with cleaning, refills, and other busywork.
- Teddy (Larry Murphy) is a bumbling but kind handyman. He is a regular at Bob's Burgers, to the point of being described as "living" in the restaurant, and views himself as having such a dedication to Bob and the restaurant that he tries to hide his patronage at other restaurants such as Jimmy Pesto's Pizzeria. Teddy regards Bob as his best friend, a sentiment Bob begrudgingly reciprocates, and is honorarily considered an uncle to Tina, Gene, and Louise. He admires the Belcher family dynamic, particularly Bob and Linda's marriage, and frequently joins the Belchers in their schemes. He is often shown to be lonely and unlucky in love, but eventually falls in love with Helen, before later starting a relationship with Kathleen. Teddy is prone to extreme emotions, somewhat socially awkward (especially around women), and frequently goes off on very long stories and tangents about mundane topics.

== Production ==
The series' initial look of the characters, including discontinued character Daniel Belcher

The first season look of the characters, including Tina Belcher, who replaced Daniel Belcher

Creator Loren Bouchard said Bob's Burgers came about because Fox's animation brand centers mostly on family, but he also wanted to dabble in workplace comedy. In his original concept, the family were cannibals, but Fox executives convinced him to drop that aspect of the series. However, the idea was referenced in the pilot episode when Louise spreads a rumor that the burgers were made of humans. Speaking of the show, President of 20th Television Animation, Marci Proietto said Bouchard had created a show that was funny but had heart. That, along with the likeable characters contributed to the show's success, referring to it as, "electric". The series has generally been viewed as a spiritual successor to King of the Hill, which carried less emphasis on shock comedy and focused more on character-driven humor. Bob's Burgers executive producer Jim Dauterive worked on King of the Hill for nearly its entire run.

=== Proof of concept ===
Before the series aired, the team created a proof of concept so Fox knew what to expect if they bought the series. Bouchard, who was living in the Mission District of San Francisco at the time, hired some local artists to work on the pilot. These included Jay Howell, the character designer, and Sirron Norris, the background designer. The test animation featured Bob forgetting about his and Linda's wedding anniversary while grinding human meat; when Linda finds a ring on a severed hand and expensive shoes on a pair of feet, she assumes Bob put the jewelry and shoes on the body parts. Fox later made a pilot episode after removing the idea of the family being cannibals. The pilot had the same synopsis as the official first episode (aired in 2011) but had substantial differences, including a different art style and the replacement of the Daniel Belcher character with Tina Belcher.

The original pilot can be seen on the DVD release of the first season, released on April 17, 2012.

=== Development ===
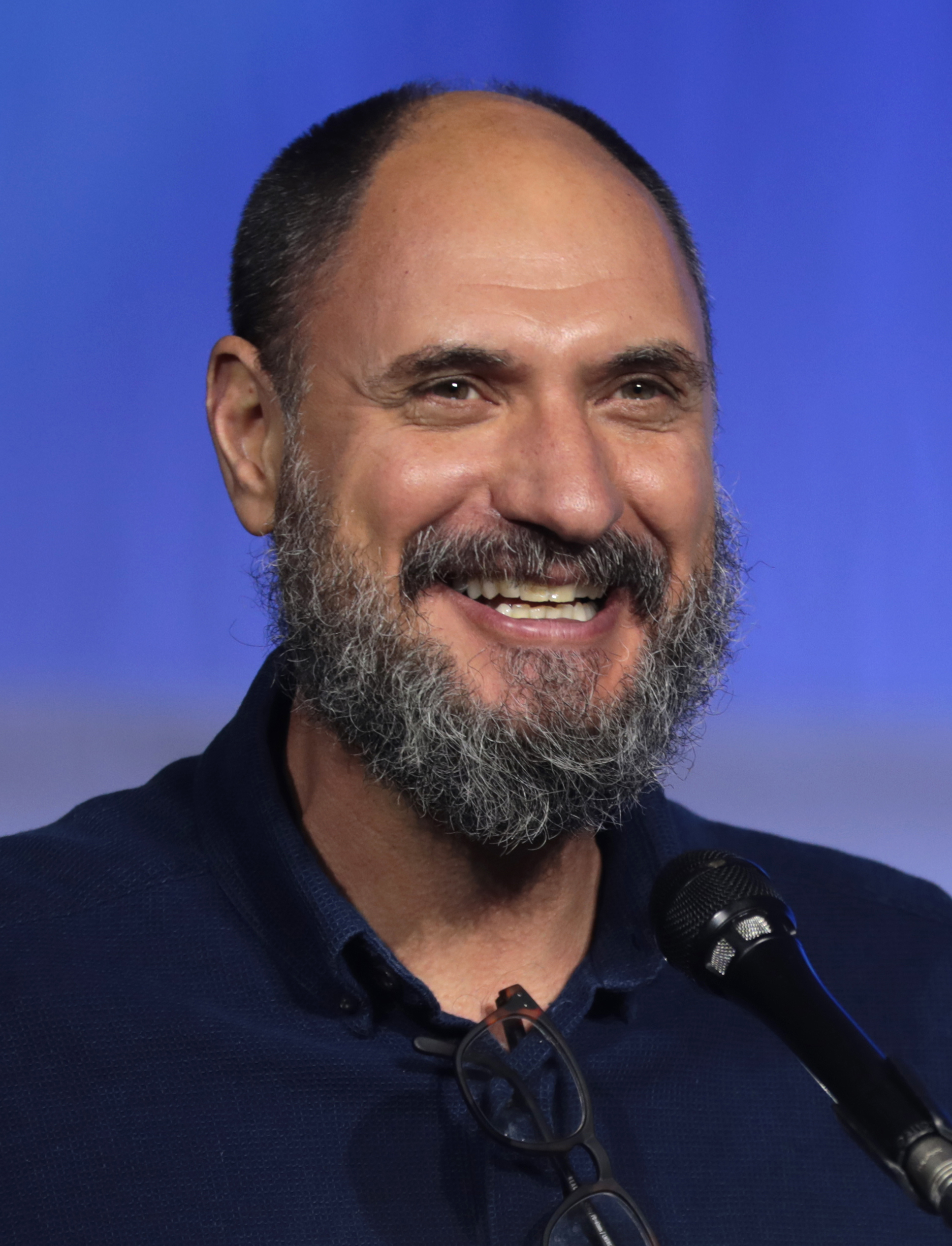
Loren Bouchard, the creator of Bob's Burgers.

Bob's Burgers first appeared on the development slate at Fox on August 6, 2009. On December 1, 2009, Fox ordered 13 episodes for the first season. On May 17, 2010, Fox placed the series on the primetime slate for the 2010–11 television season. A special preview aired on Thanksgiving on November 25, 2010.

=== Setting ===
The setting of the series is officially unnamed, though the town is referred informally among staff writers as "Seymour's Bay". Though informal, the name has appeared during the series: Bob is seen reading a newspaper titled "Seymour's Bay Times" in the season 11 episode "Y Tu Tina También", and in the season 15 episode "Dad-urday Kite Fever" Bob, who has accidentally boarded a train to Shorebridge, obtains a return ticket to Seymour's Bay. Series creator Loren Bouchard said early on that the series' location was an indeterminate Northeastern United States shore town (calling the setting a "semi-Springfield"), saying he drew inspiration from several areas (including San Francisco, whose Victorian architecture is mimicked on some of the buildings) for the town's physical appearance. As the series has proceeded, viewers and critics alike have come to a conclusion that the unnamed town is actually in southern New Jersey. The first such episode where the connection is at least attempted is the season three episode "It Snakes a Village". Additional examples include a season 8 episode where the character Tammy Larsen mentions a phone number with the area code 201, which belongs to northeastern New Jersey (although not to the Jersey Shore area). An episode of Archer that featured a crossover between the two series has also furthered the narrative: in the episode "Fugue and Riffs," Sterling Archer is discovered to have been "flipping burgers at the Shore" for several weeks due to a case of amnesia where he believes he is Bob Belcher (Archer and Belcher are both voiced by H. Jon Benjamin).

=== Executive producers ===
Creator Loren Bouchard serves as the executive producer, alongside developer Jim Dauterive. They have served as executive producers since the first season. Dan Fybel and Rich Rinaldi were promoted to executive producers during season 6. Jim Dauterive later retired after the 9th production cycle and Nora Smith replaced him as co-showrunner in the 10th production cycle.

=== Writing ===
The current team of writers include Loren Bouchard, Scott Jacobson, Lizzie Molyneux-Logelin, Wendy Molyneux, Holly Schlesinger, Nora Smith, Steven Davis, Kelvin Yu, Dan Fybel, Rich Rinaldi, Jon Schroeder, Greg Thompson, and Katie Crown. Past writers on the series include Jim Dauterive, Kit Boss, Aron Abrams, and Mike Benner. H. Jon Benjamin, Rachel Hastings, Justin Hook, Dan Mintz, and Mike Olsen have also written or co-written episodes. After the writing has been completed, the voice actors read the script as written, but later are allowed to improvise lines. The editors and writer decide what improvised lines make the final cut.

=== Character design ===
Jay Howell acted as production designer for the series, creating the designs for the main cast, and acting as the blueprint for following designers. For the first nine seasons, character designs were provided by Dave Creek, who would go on to create designs for The Great North and Central Park before his death in 2021. The original show's concept planned for the oldest of the Belcher family to be a son named Daniel. The creator of Bob's Burgers, Loren Bouchard, had cast Dan Mintz to play the part – naming Daniel's character after him. However, Kevin Reilly, the head of Fox at the time, felt as though Daniel's character was overused in media. Tina Belcher was then created in place of Daniel, which ultimately shifted the show's dynamic.

=== Voice cast ===
Cast members
H. Jon Benjamin	John Roberts	Dan Mintz	Eugene Mirman	Kristen Schaal	Larry Murphy
Bob Belcher, Jimmy Pesto Jr., various characters	Linda Belcher, Jocelyn, various characters	Tina Belcher	Gene Belcher	Louise Belcher	Teddy, various characters

Bob's Burgers has six main cast members: H. Jon Benjamin as Bob Belcher, John Roberts as Linda Belcher, Dan Mintz as Tina Belcher, Eugene Mirman as Gene Belcher, Kristen Schaal as Louise Belcher, and Larry Murphy as Teddy. John Roberts was cast as Linda based on his years of impersonating his own mother on YouTube as well as in live comedy shows. His love of music and singing only contributed to the character of Linda, who sings about any and everything.

At the Bob's Burgers Comic-Con 2018 panel, creator Loren Bouchard stated they were aware of the predominantly male gender imbalance amongst the voice actors, saying they would "strive to do better ... to have balance". He stated one of the driving factors behind this was voice actor Kristen Schaal "reprimanding" them on the issue.

In the Season 16 finale which aired May 17th 2026, there was a brief cameo from MLB baseball Player Tyler White, which marked Tyler's voice acting debut.

In response to the passing of Eric Bauza on October 25, 2026. Bauza will not return for Season 17 to continue playing as Jimmy Pesto Sr. or Big Bob. When following his reported death in 2026, the production team may need to recast both characters for Jimmy Pesto Sr. and Big Bob. Replacement voice actors have yet to be officially announced.

== Hallmarks ==
=== Opening sequence ===
The ingredients of a hamburger fall into place on a white screen, and Bob's hands appear underneath to hold it. The other family members appear around him one at a time, beginning with Linda and ending with Louise. Linda puts her arm around Bob, Tina stands expressionless, Gene plays a sound effect on his keyboard, and Louise poses for the camera. The restaurant then materializes behind them and the neighboring businesses slide into place, with a funeral parlor at screen left, and the street slides into view in front. As the family stands in front of the restaurant (with Gene bouncing in place to the beat of the theme music), a "Grand Opening" banner is placed over the door, followed by a series of mishaps: a fire, an infestation of vermin, and a car knocking down a utility pole so that it smashes the front window of the restaurant. A new banner is hung up after each event: "Grand Re-Opening," "Grand Re-Re-Opening," and finally "Grand Re-Re-Re-Opening." The camera then zooms in on the cheese on the burger Bob is holding (and the restaurant sign during Seasons 1–2), and the view fades in to the start of the episode.

As with other Fox animated series such as The Simpsons, the series employs the "changing element" running gag in its opening credits. The gag present on Bob's Burgers involves the store next to the restaurant, which has a new, humorously named occupant in every episode (such as "Betty's Machetes" in "Purple Rain-Union"). This new occupant is sometimes then used or seen in the main episode, such as in "A Fish Called Tina" (Season 10) when a plot point involved the new gym owner next door offering passes to Bob and Linda.

Additionally, beginning with Season 2, the pest control van in the sequence has the name of a different company on each episode; the van read "Rat's all Folks! Exterminators" in all episodes of Season 1. On certain episodes, an element is changed for a special night (a flash frame saying "HAPPY HALLOWEEN" was shown during the title sequence of "Fort Night").

In an article where the writers of the series rank the best 10 musical numbers of the first three seasons, series' creator and theme composer Loren Bouchard explains that the ukulele track in the theme is an edited version of the first recording he did, as well as the first take in 2008. According to Bouchard, if the EQ filter is taken off the original track, there is noise audible from the nightclub below the apartment he was living in when he recorded the theme.

Beginning in season 13, after the telephone pole crashes into the restaurant, an additional segment is added where a sinkhole opens up, referencing the events of The Bob's Burgers Movie saying "Grand Re-Re-Re-Re-Opening".

=== Credits sequence ===
The credits sequence of Bob's Burgers often features the Belcher family at work. The scene is the kitchen of Bob's Burgers drawn with a black outline over a white background and the characters in full color, with the credits off to the right hand side. The sequence consists of Bob cooking a burger and Louise and Tina doing prep. Bob places the burger on the plate for Louise to give to Linda, who takes it from the window, and a few seconds later Gene walks through the kitchen wearing his burger costume.

Although the kitchen scene is still the main closing sequence the series uses, beginning in season 2 the producers started to use different elements from the series in the credits. Other times, the scene will play out as usual, but with something from the episode going on in the background. Some episodes stray from this format entirely and use a different unique scene typically inspired by the events of the episode or a musical number from the episode, such as the credits sequence of the season 9 episode "The Gene Mile" depicting Bob watching the musical he had been trying to attend for most of the episode, or the season 13 episode "Amelia" depicting Louise and Linda working on the former's school project with the credits above the scene.

=== Daily special ===
Every episode features one or more "Today's Special" burgers on a chalkboard on the wall behind the counter. The name of the special is usually a play on words that indicates what comes on the burger (e.g. "It's Fun to Eat at the rYe M C A Burger", which comes with mustard, cheese, and avocado on rye bread). Other "Special" burgers are also mentioned by the family without being written on their chalkboard. The joke is often that the play on words is overly complex, obscure, or simply a bad pun.

=== Halloween costumes ===
Halloween was first celebrated on Bob's Burgers in Season 3 Episode 2, "Full Bars". This episode featured the first Halloween costumes on the show. The kids dressed up to go trick or treating on Kingshead Island where they would get full-sized candy bars instead of the traditional treat-sized candy normally handed out in their own neighborhood. For this occasion, Tina dressed as a "Mommy Mummy," a mummy carrying a mummy baby. Gene dressed as Queen Latifah from her U.N.I.T.Y. phase, and Louise was Edward Scissor(spoon)hands.

From then on, each season has included a Halloween episode where the Belcher Family's costumes are creative homemade masterpieces that often involve the show's affinity for puns. Past costumes include Linda dressed as a "Cher-iff," the iconic singer with a badge and handcuffs; Tina as a witch carrying two pieces of bread, or a "Sand-Witch"; Gene in a wig wearing a giant cardboard applesauce jar as "Fiona Applesauce"; and Louise as "The Bjorn Identity," dressed as Jason Bourne while wearing a Babybjörn baby carrier.

== Release ==
=== Broadcast syndication ===
Bob's Burgers currently airs on two cable networks in the United States: Adult Swim, which first began carrying the show June 23, 2013, and FXX, which started September 24, 2019. TBS, a sister station to Adult Swim, carried the show from September 26, 2016, to August 26, 2023. From 2019 to 2023, the three networks had the rights to separate seasons: Adult Swim and TBS carried the first eight seasons, while FXX carried the ninth season onward. It was initially announced in 2019 that FXX would eventually carry Bob's Burgers exclusively. However, by 2023, an alternate deal was made to keep the show on both Adult Swim and FXX (but not TBS). FXX began airing the earlier seasons on September 28, 2023, while Adult Swim began airing the later seasons on October 2, 2023. 20th Television began distributing Bob's Burgers to local stations in 2015, with new seasons being offered to local stations once Fox begins airing the next season. In September 2024, the reruns stopped being syndicated.

In the United Kingdom, Bob's Burgers airs on ITV2. In Canada, the series aired on Global from 2011 to 2015. Since 2024, Citytv and CHCH share the broadcast rights to the episodes aired on Fox due to scheduling issues. Cable channels Adult Swim Canada and FXX Canada air repeats of the show.

=== Home media and streaming ===
The first season through the current season of the series are available on the iTunes Store for download and Hulu. The first 8 seasons are available from Amazon Prime Video, and all seasons are available on Star outside of the US. Only season 1 has a brick-and-mortar release, with special features and commentaries for every episode. All other seasons are manufactured-on-demand with little-to-no extras. Bouchard has expressed embarrassment on Twitter for the quality of the official DVD-Rs when compared to some bootlegs.

Region	Set title	Episodes	Discs	Time length	Release date	Notes
1	Bob's Burgers: The Complete 1st Season	13	2	286 minutes	April 17, 2012	Special features: Audio Commentary on all episodes, "Lifting Up the Skirt of the Night" music video, Audio Outtakes for 2 episodes, Original Demo with introduction by Loren Bouchard, Louise and the Chalkboard featurette
1	Bob's Burgers: The Complete 2nd Season	9	2	198 minutes	May 7, 2013	Manufactured on demand (MOD) on DVD-R; Special feature: Table Read for Act One of An Indecent Thanksgiving Proposal
1	Bob's Burgers: The Complete 3rd Season	23	3	506 minutes	May 13, 2014	MOD on DVD-R
1	Bob's Burgers: The Complete 4th Season	22	3	484 minutes	May 12, 2015	MOD on DVD-R
1	Bob's Burgers: The Complete 5th Season	21	3	484 minutes	July 20, 2016	MOD on DVD-R
1	Bob's Burgers: The Complete 6th Season	19	3	484 minutes	October 2, 2018	MOD on DVD-R
1	Bob's Burgers: The Complete 7th Season	22	3	484 minutes	October 2, 2018	MOD on DVD-R
1	Bob's Burgers: The Complete 8th Season	21	3	484 minutes	October 2, 2018	MOD on DVD-R
1	Bob's Burgers: The Complete 9th Season	22	3	484 minutes	September 3, 2019	MOD on DVD-R
1	Bob's Burgers: The Complete 10th Season	22	3	479 minutes	June 23, 2020	MOD on DVD-R
1	The Bob's Burgers Movie	—N/a	1	102 minutes	July 19, 2022	The Blu-ray and 4K Ultra HD Blu-ray features Audio Commentary, a "Making of the Movie" Featurette, My Butt Has a Fever short film, Deleted Scenes, and Animatics and Featurettes on Animating the Movie.

== Reception ==
=== Critical reception ===
Bob's Burgers initially received mixed reviews for season 1, with a Metacritic score of 60 out of 100. Rotten Tomatoes gave the first season a 73% score based on 41 reviews with an average rating of 6.1/10. The site's critical consensus states "A modestly immature workplace cartoon, not without potential, that needs to work on finding its rhythm." The Washington Post described the series as "pointlessly vulgar and derivatively dull," while Reuters stated that "It's unwise – and unnecessary – to launch an animated sitcom on Fox that appears intent to ape the vulgarity quotient of Family Guy." USA Today stated that "Bob's Burgers isn't very tasty," describing the comedy as just "lop[ing] along, stumbling from one tasteless moment to the next." The New York Times described the series as having "a lackadaisical vibe; its humor, no matter how anarchic, slides by in a deadpan monotone."

However, as the first season progressed and concluded and the second began, critics began giving the series praise, noting its "daffy comedic momentum" and that it was "new and fresh." Rowan Kaiser of The A.V. Club has recalled, "...the show was amusing, yes, and there was certainly potential, but it took half a dozen episodes before it really began to meet that potential." Season 2 has a Metacritic score of 78 out 100, and a Rotten Tomatoes score of 100% based on 8 reviews.

Season 3 has a Rotten Tomatoes score of 88% based on 8 reviews, Season 4 has a score of 89% based on 9 reviews, season 5 has a score of 100% based on 12 reviews, and season 6 has 100% based on 10 reviews.

Entertainment Weekly gave the series an A− grade in its review, remarking that "a comedy this well done is very rare indeed." Ain't It Cool News called Bob's Burgers "perhaps the funniest half-hour currently airing on broadcast TV" in 2011. In its review, CNN called the series "wickedly funny" and said there are "too many highlights to list here." Speaking about the series during its second season, The A.V. Club reviewer Rowan Kaiser said: "After an uneven start, Bob's Burgers is becoming one of television's best comedies!" Since the debut of the second season of the series, the series' positive reception has increased.

The A.V. Club voted Bob's Burgers as the 10th best TV show of 2012, the 3rd best show of 2013, the 20th best show of 2014, and the 35th best show of 2015.

=== Ratings ===
After airing, the series became the highest-rated series premiere of the season and also finished 9th in the ratings for the week it aired. Despite this, the ratings went on a slide with ratings expert Bill Gorman of TV by the Numbers calling it a "toss up" for renewal before the series was renewed for a second season which premiered on March 11, 2012.

Viewership and ratings per season of Bob's Burgers
Season	Timeslot (ET)	Episodes	First aired		Last aired		TV season	Viewership rank	Avg. viewers (millions)
Season	Timeslot (ET)	Episodes	Date	Viewers (millions)	Date	Viewers (millions)	TV season	Viewership rank	Avg. viewers (millions)
1	Sunday 8:30 p.m.	13	January 9, 2011	9.38	May 22, 2011	4.31	2010–11	117	5.07
2	Sunday 8:30 p.m.	9	March 11, 2012	4.04	May 20, 2012	3.57	2011–12	142	4.18
3	Sunday 8:30 p.m.	23	September 30, 2012	5.46	May 12, 2013	3.38	2012–13	107	4.45
4	Sunday 8:30 p.m. (1–11); Sunday 7:00 p.m. (12–22)	22	September 29, 2013	4.48	May 18, 2014	1.95	2013–14	96	4.93
5	Sunday 7:30 p.m. (1–2, 13–18); Sunday 9:30 p.m. (3–12, 19–21)	21	October 5, 2014	3.14	May 17, 2015	2.44	2014–15	147	3.18
6	Sunday 7:30 p.m. (1–10); Sunday 8:30 p.m. (11–19)	19	September 27, 2015	2.51	May 22, 2016	2.04	2015–16	144	2.90
7	Sunday 7:30 p.m.	22	September 25, 2016	2.60	June 11, 2017	1.52	2016–17	138	2.78
8	Sunday 7:30 p.m.	21	October 1, 2017	2.93	May 20, 2018	1.62	2017–18	155	2.80
9	Sunday 8:30 p.m.	22	September 30, 2018	2.47	May 12, 2019	1.48	2018–19	TBD	TBD
10	Sunday 9:00 p.m.	22	September 29, 2019	1.82	May 17, 2020	1.28	2019–20	110	2.43
11	Sunday 9:00 p.m.	22	September 27, 2020	1.77	May 23, 2021	0.98	2020–21	127	1.74
12	Sunday 9:00 p.m.	22	September 26, 2021	1.60	May 22, 2022	0.93	2021–22	116	1.59
13	Sunday 9:00 p.m.	22	September 25, 2022	1.67	May 21, 2023	0.72	2022–23	TBD	TBD
14	Sunday 9:00 p.m. (1–11); Sunday 8:30 p.m. (12); Sunday 9:30 p.m. (13)	16	October 1, 2023	1.70	May 19, 2024	0.59	2023–24	TBD	TBD
15	Sunday 9:00 p.m. (1–10); Sunday 9:30 p.m. (11); Thursday 8:00 p.m. (12–19, 21, 22); Thursday 8:30 p.m. (20)	22	September 29, 2024	0.72	August 14, 2025	0.79	2024–25	TBD	TBD
16	Sunday 9:30 p.m.	TBA	September 28, 2025	0.63	May 17, 2026	0.78	2025–26	TBD	TBD

Bob's Burgers experienced a notable increase in viewership following its release on Hulu, gaining traction on the streaming platform. In 2017, the series was one of the top three most-watched comedies on Hulu, following South Park and Family Guy. In 2018, Hulu announced that Bob's Burgers was one of the top adult animated shows on the platform, alongside Family Guy and South Park. It also ranked as a popular choice for late-night viewers, often watched between 8 PM and midnight.

Nielsen Media Research, which records streaming viewership on certain U.S. television screens, reported that Bob's Burgers was the fourth most-streamed series of 2024, with 36.80 billion minutes of watch time. In 2025, the series ranked sixth, with 34.08 billion minutes of watch time. In December 2025, Disney announced that it was among the series to surpass one billion hours streamed on Disney+ in 2025. During the first half of 2026, Bob's Burger recorded 15.01 billion minutes of watch time, ranking sixth among the most-streamed acquired series and ninth overall, according to Nielsen Media Research. Bob's Burgers accumulated 43 billion minutes of viewing across linear television and streaming platforms between September 22, 2025, and September 20, 2026, ranking as the fifth most-watched animated series during that period.

== Other appearances ==
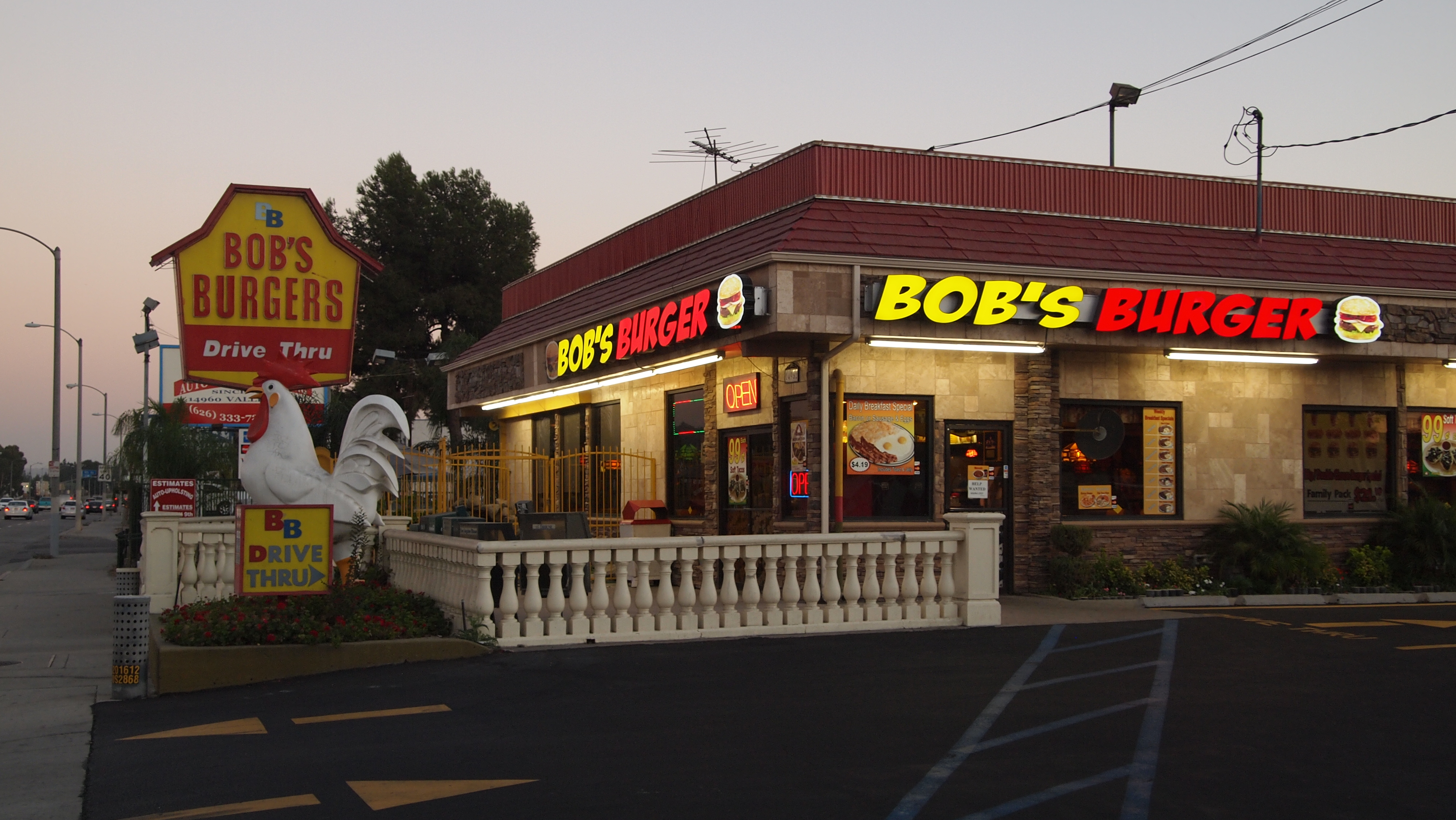
Bob's Burgers in La Puente, California, in 2016

=== Real-world ===
On January 6, 2011, some Fatburger locations were re-branded as Bob's Burgers for the day as a promotion. It also offered limited-time offers, such as a free burger giveaway, and a special, "The Thanks a Brunch Burger", on the menu until February 2011. There were also "Bob's Burgers" coupons offered for a free medium Fatburger special. Across the US, four locations were re-branded as Bob's Burgers: in California, New Jersey, Nevada, and Illinois. Two restaurant locations in California continued to use the Bob's Burgers appellation into 2016 which are located in La Puente, and Westminster, California.

=== Fictional ===
The season 4 premiere episode of Archer features a crossover where the Belcher family is shown, but Bob is revealed to be Sterling Archer (also voiced by H. Jon Benjamin) in a fugue state. Archer has taken the place of Bob Belcher, with Bob himself inexplicably missing. The menu board touts the "Thomas Elphinstone Hambledurger, with Manning Coleslaw", a play on amnesiac secret agent Tommy Hambledon, a character in a series of novels by Manning Coles.

In the Futurama episode "The Impossible Stream" a parody of the show dubbed "Blob's Burgers" is seen briefly as a thumbnail.

"Homerland", the season 25 premiere episode of The Simpsons, features a couch gag in which the Belcher family (skinned yellow according to the standard character coloring of the series) attend a 25th anniversary party in the Simpson family living room with the main characters of their fellow Animation Domination series. Bob made another cameo in the season 27 episode "The Girl Code", where a picture of him is shown, and explaining that the restaurant was boycotted by short people due to an offensive Burger of the Day. The series has also been referenced in season 30 of The Simpsons in a couch gag in the episode "My Way or the Highway to Heaven". Homer is stuck in the restaurant and the Belcher family does not understand what he wants. The original five cast members guest starred for the couch gag. Louise is seen on Cartoon Women's History poster in Lisa's bedroom in the episode "Bart vs. Itchy & Scratchy". "Simpsons World", the third segment of "Treehouse of Horror XXXIII", the sixth episode of season 34 of The Simpsons featured Linda Belcher, with John Roberts reprising his role. The segment features the fictional "Bob's Burgers Land" in a fictional amusement park. In the short film May the 12th Be with You, Linda and their children appear at the Mother's Day party in the Simpsons house along with some Hulu mothers and kids.

In the Family Guy episode "Space Cadet", the principal shows Peter and Lois a picture of Bob Belcher as a sign that Chris is doing poorly in his Advanced Art class. Peter mutters "I'm very embarrassed", and the principal replies "Well, someone should be". In "Boopa-dee Bappa-dee", Louise is one of many characters Stewie is turned into by Peter using a remote control. Bob's Burgers is also mentioned on "He's Bla-ack!" as one of the reasons why The Cleveland Show did not succeed. Bob makes a cameo appearance in the hour-long Family Guy-The Simpsons crossover "The Simpsons Guy". He appears on the same airplane as Homer and Peter in a cutaway about them being a greater team than the Air Force. Peter remarks to Homer that they have to carry Bob, and then Peter points to Cleveland's plane and says "We let that other guy try and look what happened". Cleveland, repeatedly saying "no", crashes in flames. This is a reference to the poor ratings of Bob's Burgers at the time and the cancellation of The Cleveland Show. In "Guy, Robot", Carl does an "impression" of Bob's voice. Bob's Burgers has been referenced two times in season 17. In "Trump Guy", when Peter and Lois find out that Donald Trump is about to sexually harass Meg, Chris says that Bob's Burgers is on the TV. In "Trans-Fat", the Belcher family makes a cameo appearance in the Griffin family home, but only Bob has lines. In "Hard Boiled Meg", when Seymour is revealed to be in a virtual reality experience he's offered a follow-up of Bob's Burgers. In "Adoptation", Peter goes to the restaurant to order black coffee with toast, with Bob making an appearance. In "Cabin Pressure", Bob is the new Pawtucket Brewery employee that Peter introduces (with the first reference to him as Darren). Also, Bob's Burgers is promoted during a meaningless football game between the Minnesota Vikings and the Green Bay Packers. In Season 24 during the episode "Pumpkin Spice Girls", we see the cast of Bob's Burgers at the Emmy ceremony being called onto stage to receive the award, making Peter frustrated.

In Aqua Teen Hunger Force, a character previously known as Dr. Eugene Mirman (played by himself) was renamed "Dr. Gene Belcher" in the episode "Hospice". The character's name was revealed on Aqua Teen Hunger Force's creator Dave Willis' Twitter account two hours before the episode. The character had been introduced in 2006, which was five years before Bob's Burgers aired.

Seattle rock band Sleater-Kinney collaborated with Bob's Burgers and its crew for their 2015 single "A New Wave", from the album No Cities to Love. The resultant music video featured the band, animated in the cartoon's style, performing for the Belcher children in Tina's bedroom.

In 2016, The Bob's Burgers Burger Book, edited by series creator Bouchard, was released. There are 75 burger recipes pulled from the fan-based blog "The Bob's Burger Experiment" based on the Specials of the Day that appear on the chalkboard menu in the series.

A sketch from the Robot Chicken episode "Boogie Bardstown in: No Need, I Have Coupons" has Bob Belcher compete on MasterChef Celebrity Showdown, along with SpongeBob SquarePants, Alfredo Linguini, and Jerome "Chef" McElroy. Bob has to cook with what he fears most: pigeons.

== In other media ==
=== Film ===
On October 4, 2017, Fox announced that a Bob's Burgers Movie was in the works to be released on July 17, 2020. Creator Bouchard has said the movie will "scratch every itch the fans of the show have ever had," while being appealing to new audiences. On July 18, 2018, Bouchard said that the script has been submitted and accepted by the studio. The film would be a musical comedy, involving Louise and her night light Kuchi Kopi inside her fantasy world as a minor subplot.

On November 17, 2019, it was briefly pulled from Fox's release schedule, but the following day it was back on the schedule. On April 3, 2020, Disney announced a delay to April 9, 2021, due to the COVID-19 pandemic.

On January 22, 2021, the film was delayed indefinitely, along with a few other 20th Century films.

In September 2021, the film received a new release date of May 27, 2022. Despite positive reviews from critics and audiences, the box office was below expectations, and it was released on HBO Max and Hulu on July 12, 2022.

Before the film's release, screenwriters Loren Bouchard and Nora Smith expressed interest in making a sequel film. The principal cast, including Benjamin, Schaal, Roberts, Mirman, and Mintz, have also expressed interest in a sequel on the film's commentary.

=== Comic book ===
A comic book series based on the series, published by Dynamite Entertainment, began its run in August 2014. The comic ran monthly until December of the same year. The comic was brought back for a second volume in July 2015 until October 2016.

=== Pinball ===
A virtual pinball adaptation of the series was developed and released by Zen Studios in 2015, available as an add-on for the games Zen Pinball 2, Pinball FX 2 and Pinball FX 3, as well as a standalone, paid app on iOS and Android. This table is one of four tables featured in the "Balls of Glory" pinball pack produced as a result of Zen's partnership with Fox Digital Entertainment, and features 3D animated figures of the Belcher family.

=== Video games ===
In Animation Throwdown: The Quest for Cards, the Belcher family appears as collectable cards to trade and play with among other Fox animated shows. The game also features references to the show as cards and cards with side characters on their face.

In Fortnite, Bob appears as a playable skin for players. He was added on June 14, 2025, alongside Cleveland Brown and Hank Hill. The other cosmetic items added alongside him feature a spatula and the emote "Bob's Happy Dance", first seen in "Late Afternoon in the Garden of Bob and Louise".
