= Kelvin Yu =

American actor and writer (born 1979)

- Born: 1979 (age 46–47); Santa Ana, California, U.S.
- Education: University of California, Los Angeles (BA)
- Occupations: Actor, writer
- Years active: 1992–present

Chinese name
- Traditional Chinese: 遊朝敏
- Simplified Chinese: 游朝敏
Transcriptions
Standard Mandarin
- Hanyu Pinyin: Yóu Cháomǐn

Kelvin Yu (born 1979) is an American actor and writer.

== Early life and education ==
Yu was born to Yu Ming-chuan and Lin Ling-juan. He grew up in Los Angeles, where he currently resides. He is a graduate of the University of California, Los Angeles, where he majored in film, theatre, and television. His brother, Charles Yu, is a writer.

== Career ==
=== Acting ===
Yu started acting in theater at the age of thirteen. His television credits have included guest spots on Frasier, ER, Las Vegas, Without a Trace, Studio 60 on the Sunset Strip, CSI: NY, and Bones.

Yu's first film was the 2003 comedy The Utopian Society. He later made an uncredited appearance in the 2005 film Elizabethtown. The following year, Yu had a supporting role in the comedy Grandma's Boy. Yu played a role in the Ghost Whisperer episode "Double Exposure" (3x6) as Joseph. Yu had a supporting role in the 2008 Academy Award-winning biographical political drama Milk.

Yu has starred in several short films, including 2006's My Prince, My Angel. Yu later appeared with Linda Park on the ABC series Women's Murder Club, and a lead role in the 2007 short film Fortune Hunters. In 2020, he played a role in Wonder Woman 1984.

Yu had a recurring role in the Netflix original series Master of None as the character of Brian Chang (the on-screen analogue of the show's creator Alan Yang) described as a "hottie" by Vulture magazine.

He provides the voice of a minor character on The Great North. In 2022 Yu appeared in the Apple TV+ series The Afterparty.

=== Writing ===
Yu is currently a writer and executive producer for the Fox animated series Bob's Burgers, has been nominated six times for an Emmy Award for Outstanding Animated Program, winning in 2017. In 2016, he won an Annie Award for Outstanding Achievement in Writing in an Animated TV/Broadcast Production (along with co-writer Steven Davis) for the episode "The Hauntening." Yu also is a consulting producer on Central Park and has written a few songs for that show.

In October 2021, it was announced that Disney+ had given a series order to a television adaptation of the graphic novel American Born Chinese. It will be produced by 20th Century Television with Yu and his brother Charles Yu as writers and executive producers, Marvin Mar and Jake Kasdan as executive producers, and Destin Daniel Cretton as director and executive producer.

== Filmography ==
=== Film ===
Year	Title	Role	Notes
2003	The Utopian Society	Ken	
2005	Duck	Chinese Delivery Man	
2005	Big Time	Cool Henchman	
2005	Elizabethtown	David Tan	Uncredited
2006	Grandma's Boy	Kane	
2007	If I Had Known I Was a Genius	Cost Surplus Customer	
2008	Cloverfield	Clark	
2008	Milk	Michael Wong	
2009	Timer	Nelson	
2009	Star Trek	Medical Technician	
2017	Tilt	Andy	
2020	Wonder Woman 1984	Jake	
2023	Somebody I Used to Know	Christian	

=== Television ===
Year	Title	Role	Notes
1999–2000	Popular	Freddy Gong	6 episodes
2000	Felicity	Keith Fannin	1 episode
2001	Frasier	Copy Guy	1 episode
2001	Emeril	The Camera Man	1 episode
2001	Danny	Lachardi	1 episode
2001	ER	Rondo	1 episode
2001	Any Day Now	Waiter	1 episode
2001	Men, Women & Dogs	Earl	1 episode
2001	The Tick	Tom	1 episode
2002	Gilmore Girls	Cousin David	1 episode
2002	The Shield	Sam	1 episode
2002	Life with Bonnie	Man	1 episode
2003	Judging Amy	Dr. Butler	1 episode
2003	Las Vegas	Larry	1 episode
2004	The Division		1 episode
2004	Combustion	Kit	TV movie
2005	Without a Trace	Jin Kim	1 episode
2006	Studio 60 on the Sunset Strip	Kevin Yu	2 episodes
2007	The Closer	Randy Chen	1 episode
2007	Burn Notice	Nick Lam	1 episode
2007	Dirty Sexy Money	Sam	1 episode
2007	Women's Murder Club	Fong	1 episode
2007	Ghost Whisperer	Joseph	1 episode
2008	CSI: NY	David Oka	1 episode
2008	Bad Mother's Handbook	Phil	TV movie
2009	Bones	Franklin Tung	1 episode
2009	The Forgotten	Quon Wen	1 episode
2009	NCIS: Los Angeles	Jimmy Su	1 episode
2011	Traffic Light	Brian	1 episode
2011	Hawaii Five-O	Gabriel Delgado	1 episode
2011	Torchwood	Nicolas Frumkin	1 episode
2012	Dallas	Ken	1 episode
2012	Common Law	David Paek	1 episode
2013	NCIS	Sebastian Kim	1 episode
2014	Satisfaction	Darryl	2 episodes
2015–2017	Master of None	Brian Chang	6 episodes
2016	American Dad!	Various (voice)	1 episode
2020–present	Bob's Burgers	—N/a	Executive producer
2020–2022	Central Park	Sheng	4 episodes; Also executive producer
2021	Cinema Toast	Voice	1 episode
2021–2022	The Great North	Steven Huang	6 episodes
2022	The Afterparty	Ned	8 episodes
2023	American Born Chinese		Creator, Executive Producer
2023	Clone High	Confucius (voice)	
2025	Dying for Sex	Noah	Upcoming miniseries
