= Molyneux sisters =

American screenwriters and television producers

Wendy Molyneux and Lizzie Molyneux-Logelin, known collectively as the Molyneux sisters, are American screenwriters and television producers.

== Career ==
They have written for Bob's Burgers since 2011, and won a Primetime Emmy Award for Outstanding Animated Program in 2017 and an Annie Award in 2017 for writing "The Hormone-iums". Along with Minty Lewis, the pair co-created the animated sitcom The Great North, which premiered on January 3, 2021. On November 20, 2020, it was announced that they would write the screenplay alongside returning screenwriters Rhett Reese and Paul Wernick for Deadpool & Wolverine, set in the Marvel Cinematic Universe (MCU). However, their work was not credited in the film.

The Molyneuxs are originally from Indiana, but grew up in Southern California. Wendy is a 1997 graduate of Pomona College, and is married to writer Jeff Drake, with whom she has four children. Lizzie is married to writer Matthew Logelin, with whom she has 3 children.

== Filmography ==
=== Film ===
Year	Title	Credited as		Notes
Year	Title	Writers	Producers	Notes
2022	The Bob's Burgers Movie	No	Executive	
2022	The People We Hate at the Wedding	Yes	No	

==== Uncredited writers ====
- Deadpool & Wolverine (2024) (additional literary material writers)
- The Union (2024) (additional literary material writers)

=== Television ===
Year	Title	Credited as		Notes
Year	Title	Writer(s)	Executive producer(s)	Notes
2006–2007	The Megan Mullally Show	Yes	No	Wendy only
2008	Point View Terrace	No	Yes	Wendy only
2011–present	Bob's Burgers	Yes	Yes	Wrote 30 episodes
2015	Nerd Herd	Yes	Yes	Television movie
2017	Nick Offerman & Megan Mullally: Summer of 69: No Apostrophe	Yes	No	Television special, Wendy only
2021–2025	The Great North	Yes	Yes	Co-creators, wrote 5 episodes
