= Two for Tina =

- Bob's Burgers episode
- Episode no.: Season 3 Episode 17
- Directed by: Wes Archer
- Written by: Scott Jacobson
- Production code: 3ASA04
- Original air date: March 17, 2013

Guest appearances
- Melissa Galsky as Miss Jacobson; Gabe Liedman as Douglas; Wendy Molyneux as Jen; Ben Schwartz as Josh; Bobby Tisdale as Zeke

Episode chronology
← Previous "Topsy"	Next → "It Snakes a Village"
- Bob's Burgers season 3

"Two for Tina" is the 17th episode of the third season of the animated comedy series Bob's Burgers and the overall 39th episode, and is written by Scott Jacobson and directed by Wes Archer. It aired on Fox in the United States on March 17, 2013.

== Plot ==
Tina asks Jimmy Jr. to the Wagstaff school dance and he says maybe, wanting to keep his options open. On her way home she sees her former love interest, Josh (from "Lindapendent Woman") dancing in the street with a group. After some flirty banter, Josh asks Tina to go to his school's dance and she's torn on whether to accept or to wait if Jimmy Jr. changes his mind.

Her parents both believe it's better to go with the boy who definitely wanted to go with her rather than who maybe wanted to go. When Tina tries to get a definitive response from Jimmy Jr, she gets dismissed right up until the moment she mentions someone else asked her out. Jimmy Jr. gets jealous and tries to change his answer to a yes but Tina decides to go with Josh. Meanwhile, Linda gets a call to chaperone her daughter's dance and she convinces Bob to join her to make up for the dances he never went to as a kid. Suffice to say Bob does not look forward to the dance.

Jimmy Jr. and Josh meet when he stops by after school to pick Tina up (literally) for frozen yogurt. After picking up a nervous Louise and getting an earful from a jealous Jimmy Jr (making Tina a little enthused at the possibility of two boys fighting over her) Tina and Josh leave. Zeke promises to help his friend get Tina back. At home, Bob notices how much Tina enjoys having two guys vie for her affection and doesn't like how she's seemingly stringing them along because it reminds him of the time he got dumped right outside the school dance by his date.

Zeke and Jimmy Jr. get into an impromptu wrestling match at lunch time in front of Tina, and Zeke lets his friend win to try and make him look good. Tina doesn't get swayed that easily but tells Jimmy Jr. to keep trying to impress her. Jimmy Jr. goes to Louise and Gene for help and ends up dressed as a horse reciting garbled messages via walkie talkie. Tina is firm in her decision to go with Josh and is pleased to know that her rejection just makes Jimmy Jr. want her more. While Louise and Gene stay home with a baby sitter, a dressed up Tina and Bob get ready for the dance of their lives (Linda even rented a limo hummer to take Bob to the dance in style).

School chaperoning is basically a failure in between Linda getting jealous over Bob ogling a teacher, slapping him, crying in the girl's room, revealing she faked it to give Bob a genuine taste of middle school dance drama, and sharing smuggled alcohol. Meanwhile, Jimmy Jr. crashes Josh's school dance with Zeke, Louise, Gene, and the baby-sitter in tow. Jimmy Jr. challenges Josh to a dance-off for Tina. In the end, Tina cannot choose between the two boys; she tries to make it work between the three of them, but Jimmy and Josh are put off by this and Tina ends up alone. Bob and Linda's evening ends about as well as Tina's when a drunk Linda vomits all over Bob and the two are escorted out by middle schoolers.

== Reception ==
Rowan Kaiser of The A.V. Club gave the episode an A, saying "Two For Tina" continues Bob's Burgers' winning season, which is accomplished largely by focusing on Tina. "I was skeptical of Gene and Tina as focuses for episodes initially, and while I'm still not entirely certain how often Gene can carry an episode, I'm delighted that Bob's Burgers has blasted away my Tina-based skepticism. Episodes like this one, "Tina-rannosaurus Wrecks," and "Broadcast Wagstaff School News" indicate that yes, Tina is a star. She can be the focus of the show's best episodes." Dyanamaria Leifsson of TV Equals said "There wasn't much that was surprising or particularly inventive about the plot lines in this week's Bob's Burgers, but the Belchers have always had a way of making the ordinary seem amusing, and they did just that in "Two for Tina."

The episode received a 1.7 rating and was watched by a total of 3.62 million people. This made it the third most-watched show on Animation Domination that night, beating The Cleveland Show but losing to Family Guy.
