= Boyz 4 Now =

- Bob's Burgers episode
- Episode no.: Season 3 Episode 21
- Directed by: Anthony Chun
- Written by: Lizzie Molyneux; Wendy Molyneux
- Production code: 3ASA08
- Original air date: April 28, 2013

Guest appearances
- Brooke Dillman as a judge; Max Greenfield as Boo Boo; David Herman as an announcer; Jack McBrayer as Leslie; Megan Mullally as Gayle; Tig Notaro as Jody; Laura Silverman as Andy Pesto; Sarah Silverman as Ollie Pesto; Bobby Tisdale as Zeke

Episode chronology
← Previous "The Kids Run the Restaurant"	Next → "Carpe Museum"
- Bob's Burgers season 3

"Boyz 4 Now" is the 21st episode of the third season of the American animated comedy series Bob's Burgers. Written by Lizzie and Wendy Molyneux, the episode features guest appearances from actors Max Greenfield and Jack McBrayer and comedian Tig Notaro. Its main plot sees Louise Belcher (Kristen Schaal) becoming aghast to find herself developing a crush on a member of the boy band Boyz 4 Now (Greenfield), after she reluctantly attends one of their concerts with her sister Tina (Dan Mintz). In a subplot, Gene Belcher (Eugene Mirman) qualifies for a regional competition in tablescaping, an activity involving the setting of dining tables based on a selected theme.

The series' production crew opted to make the group Boyz 4 Now a general parody of boy bands rather than base them on any specific artist, as they all had several different boy bands which "made them chuckle" while making the episode. Creator Loren Bouchard assigned several female staff members with the task of designing the physical appearances and wardrobes of Boyz 4 Now's members. The episode originally aired on April 28, 2013 on Fox, drawing an audience of 3.50 million viewers, and was met with generally positive reviews from critics, who commended its main plot for exploring the more vulnerable, feminine side of Louise's character and her sisterly relationship with Tina.

== Plot ==
Tina and Louise's aunt Gayle (Megan Mullally) has bought them tickets to an upcoming concert by the popular boy band Boyz 4 Now. Tina is excited, but Louise, who dislikes boy bands, only agrees to go at the insistence of her mother Linda (John Roberts). Gene has qualified for a regional tablescaping competition, which Bob (H. Jon Benjamin) and Linda escort him to. Louise rejoices after a pet emergency leaves Gayle unable to bring the sisters to the concert, but reluctantly agrees to help find another ride after seeing Tina's disappointment. They hitch a ride with Zeke (Bobby Tisdale) and his older cousin Leslie (Jack McBrayer), who are going to the concert to sell bootleg T-shirts and hot dogs. Bob and Linda later meet the arrogant father of a fellow competitor named Oscar Anthony, which drives them to push Gene to win.

At the concert venue, Louise scoffs at the band's obsessed female fans, warns Tina that "a lot of puberty" awaits her at the concert, and plans to wait outside. However, she is forced to bring Tina inside to prevent her from fainting. Meanwhile, Gene impresses the judges with a magic-themed table display and advances to the top four. Having not fully read the competition rule book, however, he is left unprepared to produce a second table display for the next round. The concert begins before Louise can exit, and she remains unimpressed until the band's prepubescent youngest member, Boo Boo, comes onstage. Louise is left frozen in awe by his looks, and once the band's first song starts she starts excitedly screaming out his name. Horrified at what she has done, she runs out in denial about liking Boo Boo, having never had a previous crush.

Louise runs back to the concert and starts asking Tina questions about Boo Boo, and Tina correctly deduces that she has a crush on him. Seeing Louise's panicked reaction, Tina promises to help and gets her to reveal her desire to slap Boo Boo's "hideous, beautiful face." Having been denied access to the band's backstage room, Louise and Tina sneak into their tour bus after the concert. Their cover is blown by Louise, who emerges from their hiding place desperately wanting to meet Boo Boo. The bus pulls over and the sisters debark, but not before Louise fulfills her desire to slap Boo Boo in the face. Gayle picks them up, and on the way home Louise thanks Tina for her support and says that she is over her crush. At the tablescaping competition, Gene's improvised menstruation-themed display is deemed offensive by the judges and causes him to end up in fourth place; nonetheless, the Belchers are satisfied to see Oscar's father crying over losing. That night, Louise secretly pulls out a poster of Boo Boo, slapping his face gently before going to sleep.

== Production ==
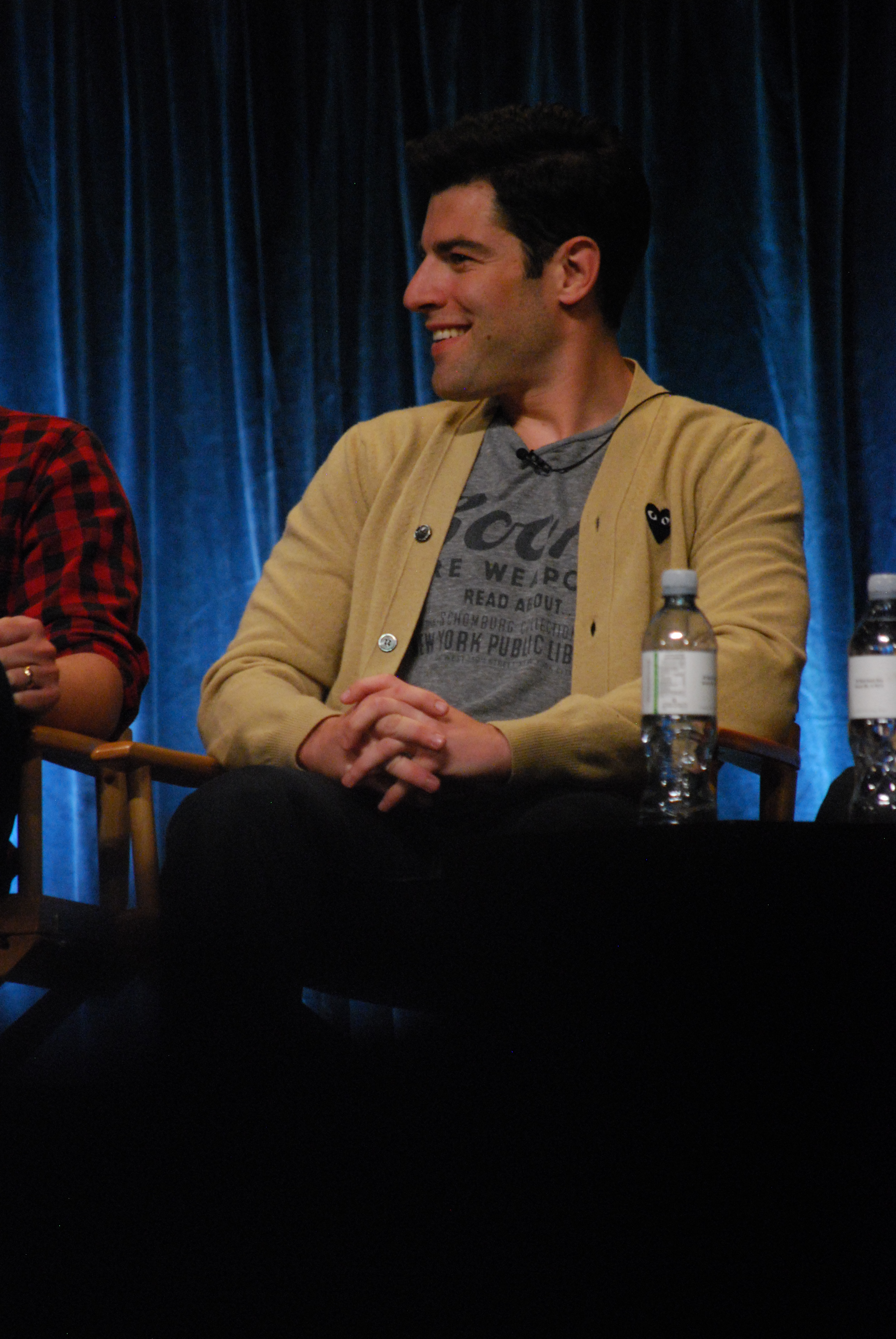
Actor Max Greenfield voiced the boy band member Boo Boo and recorded vocals for one of the episode's musical numbers.

"Boyz 4 Now" was written by Lizzie and Wendy Molyneux and directed by Anthony Chun. Upon hearing the writers' pitch of the episode, series creator Loren Bouchard found its plot to be "such an immediately appealing story" and "a great way to have Louise peek over the other side of adolescence and look into the abyss." In an interview with Rolling Stone, Bouchard cited "Boyz 4 Now" as one of his favorite episodes of the series and revealed his liking of "episodes where Louise is a little vulnerable...you don't want her to be as invulnerable as she pretends to be. If you try to keep the show grounded, then you periodically have to say, she's a nine-year-old girl." He added that while the character has "an adult sensibility about a lot of stuff," he and the writing staff try to "look for ways to bring her back down to earth," citing the episode's depiction of Louise "fighting against growing up," with Tina acting as "her strange ambassador into that world...in some ways, you couldn't ask for a better guide."

The eponymous group which "Boyz 4 Now" centers around was written as a general parody of boy bands, and not with any particular group in mind. Bouchard explained that the choice of using a non-specific type of parody was not brought about by fears that the episode would become dated, but rather because the staff all had different boy bands that "made them chuckle." He did, however, specifically research the English-Irish boy band One Direction for the episode because he "wanted to see what the state of the art was" and "hadn't been that interested in Boyz II Men or Backstreet Boys or 'N Sync." The staff had differing opinions on what Boyz 4 Now's clothes and hair would look like, choices which Bouchard ultimately left to "some of the many talented women who work on the show who had much stronger feelings about boy bands."

Actor Max Greenfield guest stars in the episode voicing Boo Boo, a member of Boyz 4 Now whom Louise develops a crush on. Series writers Steven Davis, Kelvin Yu, and Scott Jacobson composed and recorded the song "Will You Be Mine (Coal Mine)" for the episode and completed it before its table read, while Greenfield was later asked to record vocals. The Bob's Burgers writing staff later named it their fourth favorite song from the series. Other guests include stand-up comic Tig Notaro, who voices the band's tour bus driver Jody, and actor Jack McBrayer, who reprises his voice role as Zeke's older cousin Leslie.

== Reception ==
"Boyz 4 Now" first aired in the United States on April 28, 2013 on Fox, as a part of the Animation Domination programming block. The episode was watched by 3.50 million viewers and received a 1.7/5 Nielsen rating in the 18–49 demographic, becoming the fourth most-watched program of the Animation Domination block for the night. Pilot Viruet of The A.V. Club graded the episode an A−, writing that it was "full of funny moments throughout." Viruet felt that "Boyz 4 Now" was most successful at building the relationship between Tina and Louise, noting that the latter's "three-hour crush throws her for such a loop that she emerges with a newfound respect for Tina who deals with this every day." She also praised the tablescaping competition subplot, labelling it as "equally hilarious and absurd" as the main plot.

Matt Brassil of Heave Media ranked "Boyz 4 Now" as the seventh-best television episode of 2013, stating that the episode's handling of Louise's crush "cracks through that little girl surface into the inevitable woman [she] will become, and the writing starts to show how even the most maniacal girl with a bunny hat can be humanized." Phillip Maciak, writing for the Los Angeles Review of Books, named Kristen Schaal's voice acting as Louise on Bob's Burgers as his favorite television performance of the year and cited her performance in the episode: "Schaal's handling of the anger and betrayal Louise feels as she finds herself attracting to a boy for the first time is actually quite moving. But, more than that, it opens up a new register of this top-register performance as Louise’s murderous rage turns to murderous romance."
