= Bob's Burgers season 3 =

Bob's Burgers
- Season 3
- DVD cover
- No. of episodes: 23

Release
- Original network: Fox
- Original release: September 30, 2012 – May 12, 2013

Season chronology
- ← Previous; Season 2 Next → Season 4

The third season of the animated sitcom Bob's Burgers began airing on Fox in the United States on September 30, 2012, and concluded on May 12, 2013.

== Production ==
On May 14, 2012, Fox renewed Bob's Burgers for a third production cycle consisting of 13 episodes. On August 23, 2012, six additional scripts were ordered. The third season consisted of the 13 episodes from the second production cycle that did not air during the second season, and also included episodes from the third cycle.

This season featured guest stars such as Thomas Lennon, Jon Hamm, Zach Galifianakis, Jeffrey Tambor, Gary Cole, Bill Hader, and Aziz Ansari.

On May 13, 2014, Amazon.com released the season in a 3-disc-set "Burn-On-Demand" DVD-R.

== Episodes ==
No. overall	No. in season	Title	Directed by	Written by	Original release date	Prod. code	U.S. viewers (millions)
23	1	"Ear-sy Rider"	Anthony Chun	Dan Fybel & Rich Rinaldi	September 30, 2012	2ASA13	5.46
Louise gets her bunny ears stolen by a high school bully, and Bob meets the One-Eyed Snakes, a motorcycle gang, when they visit to honor their fallen leader.
24	2	"Full Bars"	Boohwan Lim & Kyounghee Lim	Steven Davis & Kelvin Yu	October 7, 2012	2ASA17	4.89
The kids skip their normal trick-or-treat route for Halloween and decide to go to a posh neighborhood, Kingshead Island, as they distribute full-sized candy bars. Meanwhile, Bob and Linda attend Teddy's annual "Black and Orange" party.
25	3	"Bob Fires the Kids"	Boohwan Lim & Kyounghee Lim	Lizzie Molyneux & Wendy Molyneux	November 4, 2012	2ASA12	3.92
When Bob feels that he is depriving the kids of any summer vacation, he decides to relieve them of duty from working the restaurant. After they get bored of their summer break, they are hired by a hippie couple to be "weed pickers". Meanwhile, Bob hires Mickey the bank robber to work at his restaurant.
26	4	"Mutiny on the Windbreaker"	John Rice	Kit Boss	November 11, 2012	2ASA08	4.89
The Belchers are shanghaied on a cruise ship when the captain requests Bob to be his personal chef. While stuck on the cruise, Gene gets a crush on a talentless ventriloquist's Mae West-inspired manatee puppet, Tina pesters a masseur to give her a massage, and Louise gets cartoonishly-long finger- and toenails at the on-board salon.
27	5	"An Indecent Thanksgiving Proposal"	Tyree Dillihay	Lizzie Molyneux & Wendy Molyneux	November 18, 2012	2ASA19	3.94
Bob's Thanksgiving traditions are interrupted when Mr. Fischoeder recruits the Belchers to pose as his family, hoping to impress an old flame.
28	6	"The Deepening"	Bernard Derriman	Greg Thompson	November 25, 2012	2ASA11	4.66
In this parody of Jaws, Mr. Fischoeder buys a mechanical shark that was used in a movie shot at Wonder Wharf. Teddy, who worked on the movie when he was young, has to battle the shark when it threatens the town's safety.
29	7	"Tinarannosaurus Wrecks"	Wes Archer	Jon Schroeder	December 2, 2012	2ASA14	3.97
When Tina accidentally totals the family car, she believes that she is jinxed when she and Bob decide to lie to the insurance agent and end up in insurance fraud.
30	8	"The Unbearable Like-Likeness of Gene"	Don MacKinnon	Holly Schlesinger	December 9, 2012	2ASA16	4.55
Gene tries to break up with his new girlfriend, Courtney (voiced by David Wain), after the family finds her annoying. When he tries to, however, he finds out that her dad writes jingles and he could possibly launch his own career. Meanwhile, Linda tries a fad diet. Note: This is the only episode that Courtney's parents have appeared together.
31	9	"God Rest Ye Merry Gentle-Mannequins"	Anthony Chun	Kit Boss	December 16, 2012	2ASA18	3.09
Bob inherits a storage unit from a dead relative, and finds a mentally-disturbed man inside who claims that he was once a clothing store mannequin whose wife went missing when he turned human.
32	10	"Mother Daughter Laser Razor"	Jennifer Coyle	Nora Smith	January 6, 2013	2ASA15	6.40
Linda fears that her bond with Louise isn't as strong as hers with Tina, so she forces Louise to attend a mother-daughter seminar. Meanwhile, Tina and Bob get their legs waxed.
33	11	"Nude Beach"	Wes Archer	Scott Jacobson	January 13, 2013	2ASA20	4.44
Darryl and the Belcher kids set up a business for kids to pay to see a good view of the nearby nude beach. Meanwhile, a new health inspector replaces Hugo and Bob disagrees with him.
34	12	"Broadcast Wagstaff School News"	Jennifer Coyle	Greg Thompson	January 27, 2013	2ASA21	4.12
Tina vows to find the "mad pooper" running rampant at the children's school. Meanwhile, Gene starts dressing and acting like Bob.
35	13	"My Fuzzy Valentine"	Boohwan Lim & Kyounghee Lim	Dan Fybel & Rich Rinaldi	February 10, 2013	3ASA01	3.45
Bob and the kids try to find the perfect Valentine's Day gift for Linda. Meanwhile, Linda opts to hold an impromptu speed-dating event at the restaurant.
36	14	"Lindapendent Woman"	Don MacKinnon	Mike Benner	February 17, 2013	2ASA22	3.93
Bob and Linda try to think of ways to cut expenses. Linda decides to go shopping at Fresh Feed, a grocery store, where after talking to the manager about the store gets a part-time job. At the same time, Tina tries to find a boy she briefly met there.
37	15	"O.T.: The Outside Toilet"	Anthony Chun	Lizzie Molyneux & Wendy Molyneux	March 3, 2013	3ASA02	3.67
In a parody of E.T. the Extra-Terrestrial, Gene finds a talking toilet (voiced by Jon Hamm), and he is determined to keep it out of the wrong hands.
38	16	"Topsy"	Tyree Dillihay	Loren Bouchard & Nora Smith	March 10, 2013	3ASA03	3.85
Louise tries to take down her Thomas Edison-obsessed science teacher by recreating the Topsy incident using Gene and Tina. Meanwhile, Bob and Linda fight over which of their spice-rack based inventions is better.
39	17	"Two for Tina"	Wes Archer	Scott Jacobson	March 17, 2013	3ASA04	3.62
Tina starts dating a ballet dancer, making Jimmy, Jr. jealous. Bob and Linda chaperone a school dance, making up for Bob having never attended one.
40	18	"It Snakes a Village"	Jennifer Coyle	Kit Boss	March 24, 2013	3ASA05	3.76
While the restaurant and the house are being fumigated, the Belchers decide to visit Linda's parents retirement community in Florida. Much to the kids' dismay, the retirement community pool is closed for cleaning and they have to find new ways to entertain themselves. Linda discovers that the community is for retirees who participate in swinging. Meanwhile, the kids get hired by a woman in the same village to hunt and take a picture of a python residing in the village forest, which she believes is responsible for the loss of her dog Bitsy.
41	19	"Family Fracas"	Don MacKinnon	Holly Schlesinger	April 14, 2013	3ASA06	3.45
The Belcher family competes against the Pesto family in a game show to win a new minivan after the family car breaks down.
42	20	"The Kids Run the Restaurant"	Boohwan Lim & Kyounghee Lim	Steven Davis & Kelvin Yu	April 21, 2013	3ASA07	3.74
After Bob goes to the hospital, the kids take over the restaurant and transform it into a casino.
43	21	"Boyz 4 Now"	Anthony Chun	Lizzie Molyneux & Wendy Molyneux	April 28, 2013	3ASA08	3.50
Tina and Louise attend a Boyz 4 Now concert, leading Louise to discover her crush on the lead singer. Meanwhile, Gene competes in a "table-scaping" competition.
44	22	"Carpe Museum"	Tyree Dillihay	Jon Schroeder	May 5, 2013	3ASA09	3.96
The kids go on a school trip to the museum and Linda signs Bob up to be a chaperone.
45	23	"The Unnatural"	Wes Archer	Greg Thompson	May 12, 2013	3ASA10	3.38
Gene joins a baseball camp that turns out to be a scam. Meanwhile, Tina gets hooked on espresso.
