= The Goode Family =

American animated television series

- The Goode family. From the left: Gerald, Helen, Bliss, Che, and Ubuntu
- Genre: Animated sitcom; Political satire
- Created by: Mike Judge; John Altschuler; Dave Krinsky
- Showrunners: John Altschuler; Dave Krinsky
- Starring: Mike Judge; Nancy Carell; David Herman; Linda Cardellini; Brian Doyle-Murray; Dee Bradley Baker
- Theme music composer: Groove Addicts
- Country of origin: United States
- Original language: English
- No. of seasons: 1
- No. of episodes: 13

Production
- Executive producers: Mike Judge; John Altschuler; David Krinsky; Tom Lassally; Michael Rotenberg
- Running time: 22 minutes
- Production companies: Ternion Pictures; 3 Arts Entertainment; Judgemental Films; Media Rights Capital; Film Roman

Original release
- Network: ABC
- Release: May 27 – August 7, 2009

The Goode Family is an American animated sitcom that originally aired on ABC from May 27 to August 7, 2009. It follows the life of an environmentally responsible but obsessive family. Mike Judge created the show along with former King of the Hill writers John Altschuler and David Krinsky. The show was cancelled after its first season on August 8, 2009.

The series was released on DVD format on January 8, 2013, by Shout! Factory.

== Premise ==
In the fictional town of Greenville, California, the Goode family struggles with the modern social and environmental responsibilities of being liberals, and the paradoxes that arise for a working-class family when trying to be politically correct all of the time about everything. Situations in the first episode included shopping at a natural foods store, not having brought reusable bags, how to refer to ethnic groups, analyzing conservative beliefs they typically despise, and raising modern teenagers. The pilot satirized both stereotypical "liberal" and "conservative" mindsets, including the ongoing derangement of the family's "vegan" dog (who has taken to eating neighborhood pets).

== Characters ==
=== Main characters ===
- Gerald Goode (voiced by Mike Judge) – An administrator at a community college. He comes from a "long line of over-educated academic liberals". He rides a bicycle for transportation to protect the environment, and his trademark clothing is a cycling uniform. He is very fastidious and easily disgusted, both by animals and people. His voice and character traits resemble those of the David Van Driessen character from Mike Judge's earlier series Beavis and Butt-Head.
- Helen Goode (voiced by Nancy Carell) – Gerald's wife. A local activist who has "daddy issues". She is concerned about her social status among the other eco-conscious people in Greenville, and often tries to impress the wealthy wife of Gerald's boss.

- Ubuntu Goode (voiced by David Herman) – The Goodes' adopted son, named after Ubuntu, a concept from African philosophy (mispronounced by the characters as /juːˈbʌntuː/ instead of /uːˈbuːntuː/). The Goodes adopted him in the name of promoting racial tolerance within the community, but due to their vagueness in filling out the adoption paperwork, the family ended up with a white South African baby instead of the black infant they wanted, but decided to keep him because it was an interesting challenge to raise a "racist born" white baby as a liberal adult. Ubuntu is often shown conflicted with a seemingly innate desire to go against his parents' lifestyle; however, rather than being an outright rebellion, this seems to reflect the nature and nurture controversy. He sleeps in footy pajamas that are decorated with big rig trucks. Despite his seemingly naive and childlike nature, he is really accomplished at both sports and machinery; he is a member of his high school's football team.
- Bliss Goode (voiced by Linda Cardellini) – Helen and Gerald's biological daughter. One of the characters with a sense of reason, she often disagrees with and mocks her parents' political stances, about which she is usually better-informed. She serves as the show's chief foil by poking holes in Gerald's and Helen's world view. In later episodes, she has tended to agree with her parents, and in some instances has helped them to achieve a common goal.
- Che (voiced by Dee Bradley Baker) – The family's dog, named after the communist revolutionary Che Guevara. The Goodes feed him vegan food which he dislikes. He craves meat and often eats neighborhood animals and pets. As a consequence, "missing" flyers of neighborhood pets blanket street poles.
- Charlie (voiced by Brian Doyle-Murray) – Helen's politically incorrect SUV-driving father who mostly likes making fun of her lifestyle. He frequently ridicules Gerald and Helen for their beliefs, although he seems to favor Ubuntu more due to him being involved in the football team, and Bliss who seems to share his opinions.

=== Other characters ===
- Kiki (voiced by Amy Hill) – The Goodes' next-door neighbor.
- Solosolo (voiced by Phil LaMarr) – Football quarterback at Greenville High School, and son of Kiki.
- Margo Jensen (voiced by Julia Sweeney) – Helen's arrogant rival who relentlessly puts down the Goodes (but mostly just Helen). She is an influential member of the Greenville community and embodies everything Helen wants to be, while at odds with Helen and vice versa. Helen seems to mostly get the best of her, and her purpose is to show the type of person who is holier-than-thou while being a faux personality who seizes on fads to increase her social standing.
- Kent Jensen (voiced by Jonathan Slavin) – Gerald's boss at Greenville Community College, and Margo's husband.
- Penny (voiced by Lori Nasso) – A neighbor who is single and childless, and makes occasional comments about her loneliness and desire to have children. Her beliefs fluctuate, and she will take liberal causes only to abandon them shortly afterwards to her personal benefit.
- Ray Johnson (voiced by Gary Anthony Williams) – An easy-going, country music-loving black neighbor of the Goodes who drives a gas-guzzling car and thinks of race as less important than the Goodes do, as an unexpected device.
- Mo (voiced by Laraine Newman) – A lesbian the Goodes are friends with, along with her partner, Trish. Mo worked on an oil rig.
- Trish (voiced by Julia Sweeney) – Trish is Mo's partner.
- Souki Lao (voiced by Cree Summer) – An affluent, snobbish lesbian who Gerald and Helen befriend in "A Tale of Two Lesbians."
- Jennifer "Jenn" Wilcox (voiced by Grey DeLisle) – Another lesbian, and Souki's partner.
- Isabelle (voiced by Laraine Newman) – Duncan's wife and part of Margo, Jenn, and Souki's elitist crowd.
- Duncan (voiced by Gary Anthony Williams) – Isabelle's husband.
- Treyvon (voiced by David Herman) – A teenage employee at One Earth, an organic supermarket frequented by the Goodes, Margo and Greenville's Liberal elite (the store is frequently seen featuring a large sign telling its shoppers what is good and what is bad; Farm-Raised Catfish constantly moving between good and bad). Treyvon is also an amateur filmmaker whom Bliss tries to befriend. He comes across as a suburbanite that thinks it is "cool" to make fun of others with illiberal beliefs.
- Mr. Heelo (voiced by Howard Kremer) – The manager of the "One Earth" supermarket.
- The Average Guy (voiced by Mike Judge or David Herman) - A newscaster that does stories from the average point of view.
- Maffew (voiced by Phil LaMarr) – Leader of a gang of thugs.
- Dawn (voiced by Tara Strong) – Female member of Maffew's gang.
- Other Two Thugs (voiced by Phil LaMarr and David Herman) – Members of Maffew's gang.
- Benny (voiced by David Herman) – Victim of the rival drug dealers.
- Principal Whitmore (voiced by Phil LaMarr) – Principal at Greenville Community College.
- Mrs. Glavin (voiced by Tara Strong) – Teacher at Greenville Community College.
- Tanya (voiced by Cree Summer) – Greenville Community College student who is in model congress.
- Professor Mead (voiced by Elvis Costello) – Teacher at Oxford University.
- Michelle (voiced by Alyson Hannigan) – Director of community service at Greeneville Community College.
- Jeff (voiced by Diedrich Bader) – Teacher at Greenville Community College.

== Crew ==
The show is created by Mike Judge, John Altschuler, and Dave Krinsky, with Altschuler and Krinsky serving as show runners. The show is directed by John Rice, Seth Kearsley, Jennifer Coyle, and Anthony Chun, with Wes Archer as supervising director. Show writers include Jonathan Collier, Jace Richdale, Gene Hong, Owen Ellickson, Dave Jeser, Franklin Hardy, Leila Strachan, Brad Pope, Howard Kremer, Shane Kosakowski, Jordana Arkin, and Matt Silverstein, in addition to Altschuler and Krinsky, and other writers.

== Episodes ==
No.	Title	Directed by	Written by	Original release date	Prod. code
1	"Pilot"	Wes Archer	John Altschuler, Mike Judge & Dave Krinsky	May 27, 2009	GFA01
Bliss takes drastic action and joins an abstinence group after hearing more than her fair share of safe sex talk from her mother. Ubuntu wants to learn to drive now that he has turned sixteen.
2	"Goodes Gone Wild"	John Rice	Jordana Arkin	June 3, 2009	GFA02
Helen adopts an uncategorized animal in an effort to get Charlie to notice her good deeds. With no way of knowing how it acts and what it eats, she has quite an undertaking. Elsewhere, Gerald gets a helping hand from Che in order to get rid of the squirrels plaguing the college.
3	"Gerald's Way or the Highway"	Seth Kearsley	Jace Richdale	August 7, 2009	GFA03
Gerald takes over a highway in order to show his kids what one man can do to change things for the better. Unfortunately, the highway is being used to traffic drugs, and Gerald unknowingly gets into a turf war with the dealers.
4	"A Tale of Two Lesbians"	Anthony Chun	Franklin Hardy & Shane Kosakowski	June 19, 2009	GFA04
Gerald and Helen offend a lesbian couple so must seek out new lesbian friends in order to prove they aren't being offensive. Meanwhile, Ubuntu discovers he is quite adept at playing bingo.
5	"Helen's Back"	Jennifer Coyle	Jonathan Collier	June 12, 2009	GFA05
When Helen loses the ability to walk through a back injury, the family turn to a Latino gardening team in order to be part of an organic garden tour. Elsewhere Bliss and Ubuntu try out the 'trading up' scheme.
6	"Pleatherheads"	John Rice	Matt Silverstein & Dave Jeser	June 3, 2009	GFA06
Ubuntu finds himself as the main man on the football team so Helen and Gerald need to learn what being a "football family" actually means. Bliss is worried she might not get into college so she goes to great lengths to give herself a better shot at getting in.
7	"Public Disturbance"	Anthony Chun	Owen Ellickson	July 24, 2009	GFA07
In an effort to bring public radio to the town, Gerald tries to get the other residents to become involved as well.
8	"Graffiti in Greenville"	Seth Kearsley	Leila Strachan	July 3, 2009	GFA08
Helen becomes a graffiti artist in order to make Bliss do some actual work, because she has been lying to her about the work she's been 'doing'. When her work begins to get noticed, Helen realizes she will need to come out of the shadows if she wants to get recognition for what she has done.
9	"A Goode Game of Chicken"	Jennifer Coyle	Gene Hong	July 10, 2009	GFA09
Gerald eats a meal that contains chicken even though it is not supposed to. He decides to take on Cranky (a chef) to protest what happened. Elsewhere, nobody can find Che so they assume he is missing.
10	"Freeganomics"	John Rice	Brad Pope & Howard Kremer	June 26, 2009	GFA10
Helen gets the support of 'Freegan' Heinrich in order to get more people to come to the Eco Festival. After realizing what sort of person he is, they have difficulty getting him to leave their home.
11	"Trouble in Store"	Seth Kearsley	Jordana Arkin	July 31, 2009	GFA11
Helen is banned from One Earth on the day of Gerald's big meal, after 'stealing' something from the store.
12	"After-School Special"	Anthony Chun	Franklin Hardy & Shane Kosakowski	July 17, 2009	GFA12
When Helen and Gerald stop paying attention to their own kids due to mentoring at-risk children, Bliss and Ubuntu start causing trouble of their own.
13	"A Goode Man is Hard to Find"	Jennifer Coyle	Dave Jeser & Matt Silverstein	August 7, 2009	GFA13
Gerald is under the impression that he is to become a sperm donor, and Charlie teaches Ubuntu about being a man after he gets his first facial hair.

== Cancellation ==
On August 8, 2009, ABC Entertainment President Steve McPherson explained that the show, along with Surviving Suburbia, had officially been canceled due to low ratings.

On November 1, 2009, Mike Judge announced that ABC was not interested in a second season of The Goode Family. In 2009, the series ended on August 7, 2009, after the season one episode "A Goode Man is Hard to Find".

In 2010, reruns of The Goode Family aired Monday nights at 10 p.m. on Comedy Central, beginning January 4. It was to be evaluated for new episodes. It departed the network's primetime schedule after four weeks, returning occasionally in low-trafficked timeslots.

== Future ideas and concepts ==
While the show is still officially canceled, Media Rights Capital ordered an additional 10 episode scripts, which is customary in prime time television in order to get a show immediately back into production in time if another season is ordered. Showrunners John Altschuler and Dave Krinsky have mentioned these ideas for possible future episodes:

- Bliss asserts her own identity further. John and Dave believe she can become funnier.
- Brian "Bri-Bri" Kennedy may return as a greedy businessman who convinces Helen and Gerald that his schemes are "for the Earth and stuff."
- More plots involving Mo and Trish, and their enemies Jen and Suki.

== Reception ==
When first airing, the show received mixed reviews. A reviewer for the Los Angeles Times said: "The Goode Family, which is nicely acted and well animated, works best when the cultural potshots give way to the more basic human needs of its characters: a mother's desire to be close to her daughter, or to her father (Brian Doyle-Murray as the resident voice of political incorrectness), in spite of 'a lifetime of crippling negative comments,' and a father's willingness to go outside his comfort zone to make his son happy, as when Ubuntu joins the football team. There's a show there." A reviewer for NJ.com said: "The Goode Family feels as if you are being dropped into a foreign land without any kind of guide, or even map."

== See also ==
- King of the Hill
- Mike Judge
