= God Rest Ye Merry Gentle-Mannequins =

- Bob's Burgers episode
- Episode no.: Season 3 Episode 9
- Directed by: Anthony Chun
- Written by: Kit Boss
- Production code: 2ASA18
- Original air date: December 16, 2012

Guest appearances
- Zach Galifianakis as Chet; Pamela Adlon as Olsen Benner; Andy Kindler as Mort; Tim Meadows as Mike; Larry Murphy as Teddy; Fred Stoller as Sex Shop Owner

Episode chronology
← Previous "The Unbearable Like-Likeness of Gene"	Next → "Mother Daughter Laser Razor"
- Bob's Burgers season 3

"God Rest Ye Merry Gentle-Mannequins" is the ninth episode of the third season of the animated comedy series Bob's Burgers and the overall 31st episode, and is written by Kit Boss and directed by Anthony Chun. It aired on Fox in the United States on December 16, 2012.

== Plot ==
When Bob inherits a storage unit around Christmas, the family hope that they will contain riches, but instead they find a squatter named Chet who claims he was previously a display mannequin. The family takes him in, only to discover that he has a talent for creating seasonal window displays out of mannequins, in which he also poses. The displays Chet put up in preparation for Christmas prove very popular with people stopping to look at the display and helps increase business for the restaurant. As Christmas approaches, Chet becomes increasingly unstable, eventually claiming he is in love with another mannequin, Nadine, whom he had been separated from after the store where he used to reside went out of business.

Chet then further claims that he met Nadine when the store, Lombard's Department Store, was at its peak in business, and his relationship with Nadine became more "casual" and that one day Nadine had an accident that ended with her right hand being destroyed and Nadine coming back with two left hands instead of a replacement right hand. Chet then claims that when Lombard's Department Store eventually went out of business because of the mall, OMG Mall, he was separated from Nadine soon after and that the pain of being separated from her "turned him into a human." Tina proclaims that Chet's story is "the greatest love story ever told" and convinces Chet they could help him find Nadine even if they have to look far and wide to find her.

Bob doesn't approve of the kids looking for her and says Chet was never a mannequin and that Nadine is probably in a dump somewhere, upsetting him. Upset with her husband, Linda storms to her bedroom and demands a snack. In his misery, Chet creates a macabre and terrifying display, and the desperate family track Nadine down to a sex store, much to the dismay and disapproval of Bob, who reluctantly joins the kids in going to the sex store and get Nadine back. Liberating the mannequin, they reunite her with Chet and convince him to create a more appropriate display in time for Christmas. The display gets a brief moment of success but is interrupted by the sudden arrival of the sex shop owner demanding they give Nadine back and wrecks the display in the process of trying take Nadine back. The kids then pay the owner $263 to buy the mannequin back so Chet can keep Nadine. Eventually, the crowd becomes fed up with the wrecked display, and everyone leaves.

The family then decides to let Chet stay until January. The family then enjoys Christmas morning with Gene getting a door exit sign, Tina getting a shoe-sizer and Louise a security tag remover. Bob then asks what Chet plans on doing after they kick him out when January arrives, and Chet reveals that he plans on staying at his apartment in Manhattan and that he plans on seeing how a renovated loft turns out, revealing that he wasn't homeless at all, much to Bob's shock and anger.

== Reception ==
Rowan Kaiser of The A.V. Club gave the episode a A−, saying "The entire episode hits that sweet spot between sweet and weird. Even the moment where Chet goes a little crazy and makes a horrifying window display is oddly endearing, thanks to the ketchup bottle squirting 'blood.' That's clever, weird, but also impressive. That’s Bob's Burgers, and I'm happy that the show is getting a chance to apply its impressive clever weirdness to the holidays." Ross Bonaime of Paste gave the episode 8.5 out of 10, saying "God Rest Ye Merry Gentle-Mannequins" is essentially everything you could want from a holiday episode of Bob's Burgers. Chet's story of finding mannequin love with Nadine is so ridiculous, yet everyone in the family except Bob finds it to be beautiful. Tina even proclaims it to be the greatest love story ever told. That may not be accurate, but it's definitely the weirdest love story you're going to find in a holiday TV special."

The episode received a 1.5 rating and was watched by a total of 3.09 million people. This made it the fourth most watched show of Fox's Animation Domination block that night, beating The Cleveland Show but losing to The Simpsons with 3.77 million.
