= Deepening =

Deepening may refer to:

- Rapid deepening
- Capital deepening
- Financial deepening

Other uses:

- Dredging
- Port Phillip Channel Deepening Project
- "The Deepening", an episode of Bob's Burgers
