= Mutiny on the Windbreaker =

- Bob's Burgers episode
- Episode no.: Season 3 Episode 4
- Directed by: John Rice
- Written by: Kit Boss
- Production code: 2ASA08
- Original air date: November 11, 2012

Guest appearances
- David Herman as Duval; Larry Murphy as Asch; Jeffrey Tambor as Captain Flarty; Paul F. Tompkins as Herman

Episode chronology
← Previous "Bob Fires the Kids"	Next → "An Indecent Thanksgiving Proposal"
- Bob's Burgers season 3

"Mutiny on the Windbreaker" is the fourth episode of the third season of the animated comedy series Bob's Burgers and the overall 26th episode, and is written by Kit Boss and directed by John Rice. It aired on Fox in the United States on November 11, 2012.

== Plot ==
Bob tries to train the kids to hand out posters advertising Bob's Burgers, but it does not go according to plan, and the kids do not hand out a lot of posters to people.

Bob is recruited to cook, on a one night basis, by Captain Flarty (Jeffrey Tambor) on his ship Windbreaker. To entice him, the rest of the Belcher family is given a VIP card and the run of the ship. Once on the ship, Bob finds the current chef's work deplorable, Linda goes crazy with the VIP card, Gene experiences confusing feelings for a manatee puppet, Tina seeks out a massage, and Louise has her nails done.

Before Bob's one night engagement ends, Windbreaker sets sail, kidnapping the Belchers, though only Bob seems disturbed by this leaving nobody available to watch the restaurant. The voyage proves to be deplorable for Bob, as the Captain's current chef Duval proves to be almost unbearable—making vegetable stew from vegetables that are not fresh, and purposely sweating into the stew to "save on salt". Bob finds this disturbing, but Duval claims that the passengers do not care, and only complain if they run out, which angers Captain Flarty, and he insists on serving rotten oysters to the passengers, despite that it could cause them to suffer food poisoning.

Can no longer stand both Flarty and Duval, Bob escapes. He attempts to signal a nearby ship for help, but Captain Flarty drowns Bob out with loud music, and the nearby ship captain proceeds to ignore Bob, thinking that Bob is just messing with him. After spending the night hiding from Captain Flarty and his crew in one of the ship's pools, Bob finds Duval drinking in a large pot, and tries to convince the chef to throw the rotten oysters overboard, but Duval locks Bob in a walk-in room on the ship still insisting on serving the oysters to the passengers attending the buffet, claiming that Captain Flarty is "complicated" but knows what is best.

Bob manages to escape the walk-in using a can of canned meat to break open an air vent and make the hole big enough for him to fit through. He eventually finds Louise who is busy experimenting with her new Wolverine-style long nails, and asks her to help distract the captain so that he can get the oysters away from the buffet. Bob arrives at the buffet too late, and the passengers attending insist on eating the oysters, unaware that they are spoiled, and think that Bob wants the oysters for himself. Louise executes the distraction plan, but accidentally leads everyone to Bob in the process. Bob tries to lead a mutiny against the captain, but does not get support from the crew until a seaman on the ship reports that people attending the buffet are suffering from food poisoning because of the rotten oysters that the captain forced Duval to serve at the buffet. Captain Flarty tries to put Bob on a dinghy as a punishment, but Duval and the rest of the crew turn against the captain, having had enough of cleaning up the captain's messes.

Bob and the rest of the family return home, and much to Bob's disappointment, the outside of the restaurant is covered in squished, splattered, and crushed meat from a Grade A beef delivery he was expecting prior to reluctantly joining the captain on his voyage, and due to his experience on the ship Bob is not in the mood to deal with it.

== Reception ==
Rowan Kaiser of The A.V. Club gave the episode a B−, saying "'Mutiny On The Windbreaker' isn't necessarily a bad episode of television, even if it's lacking as an episode of Bob's Burgers. The captain, voiced by Arrested Development's Jeffrey Tambor, mixes charm and insanity at just the right levels, and Bob's relationship with the ship's disgruntled French chef leads to the funniest lines of the evening. Even still, it's filled more with charm and chuckles than the big laughs Bob's Burgers gets at its best, which makes comparing it to a good, late-season episode of The Simpsons even more apt."

Ross Bonaime of Paste gave the episode a 7.6 out of 10, saying "This week's episode, "Mutiny on the Windbreaker," is one of the weaker episodes of the show’s third season, most likely because it splits up all five of the Belcher family members. It may seem like more fun to have all three of the Belcher kids have their own separate storylines—three times the wackiness!—but it ends up not working as well as having the kids together as a team. For the first time in a while, even Bob and Linda are separated for most of the episode." The episode received a 3.1 rating and was watched by a total of 4.89 million people. This made it the third most watched show on Animation Domination that night, losing to The Simpsons and Family Guy with 5.57 million.
