= Wes Archer =

American television animation director

- Born: Wesley Meyer Archer; 1960 or 1961 (age 64–65); Houston, Texas, U.S.
- Education: California Institute of the Arts
- Occupation: Animation director
- Years active: 1985–present
- Known for: The Simpsons; King of the Hill; Rick and Morty

Wesley Meyer Archer (born 1960 or 1961) is an American animation director. He is best known for directing on series such as The Simpsons, King of the Hill and Rick and Morty, and is a three-time Emmy Award winner.

== Early life and education ==
Wesley Meyer Archer was born in Houston, Texas. From a young age, he had regular run-ins with the law, including five arrests for such crimes as shoplifting, marijuana possession, and driving under the influence. After high school, he required permission from his probation officer to leave Texas to attend the California Institute of the Arts.

== Career ==
Archer began his career while still a student, animating a short film for HBO. In 1987, his work animating commercials for Klasky Csupo caught the eye of Gracie Films, leading to his work on The Simpsons shorts on The Tracey Ullman Show.

Archer was one of the original three animators (along with David Silverman and Bill Kopp) on the Tracey Ullman shorts, and subsequently directed a number of The Simpsons episodes (many of which had John Swartzwelder as an episode writer) before becoming supervising director at King of the Hill. A few years later he left King of the Hill to direct for Futurama, before eventually returning to King of the Hill. Wes continued to supervise the direction of King of the Hill until the final season. He acted as a consulting director for the last season of King of the Hill, as he joined The Goode Family as supervising director. When The Goode Family was not picked up for a second season he joined Bob's Burgers for its first three seasons.

In 2015 he joined Rick and Morty and directed three episodes during season two. Afterwards he served as the supervising director on Rick and Morty from seasons three through seven. Archer's college animation film, "Jac Mac and Rad Boy, Go!" has long been a cult classic after receiving repeated airplay on USA Network's Night Flight in the 1980s. He studied at the Film Graphics/Experimental Animation Program at CalArts. In 1999, he was the creator of an attempted weekend animated cartoon strip Victor, for Film Roman's Max Degree TV block, but never got off the ground due to lack of international backers. He is currently the supervising director on the revival of King of the Hill.

Archer has been nominated for seven Emmy Awards for Outstanding Animated Program, winning three: 1999, 2018, and 2020.

== Filmography ==
- One Crazy Summer (1986) (animator)
- The Simpsons (1990–1996) (director, sheet director, storyboard, storyboard artist)
- King of the Hill (1997–2009, 2025–present) (supervising director, executive animation consultant, consulting director)
- Eloise: The Animated Series (2006) (creative director)
- The Goode Family (2009) (supervising director)
- Bob's Burgers (2011–2013) (director)
- Allen Gregory (2011) (director)
- Murder Police (2013) (supervising director)
- Rick and Morty (2015–2022) (director, supervising director)
- Disenchantment (2018) (director)

=== The Simpsons episodes ===
Season 1

- "Homer's Odyssey"
- "Moaning Lisa"
- "The Call of the Simpsons"
- "The Crepes of Wrath"

Season 2

- "Treehouse of Horror"
- "Two Cars in Every Garage and Three Eyes on Every Fish"
- "Bart the Daredevil"
- "One Fish, Two Fish, Blowfish, Blue Fish"
- "Oh Brother, Where Art Thou?"
- "Three Men and a Comic Book"

Season 3

- "Mr. Lisa Goes to Washington"
- "The Otto Show"

Season 4

- "New Kid on the Block"
- "I Love Lisa"

Season 5

- "Rosebud"
- "$pringfield (Or, How I Learned to Stop Worrying and Love Legalized Gambling)"
- "Homer Loves Flanders"
- "Lady Bouvier's Lover"

Season 6

- "Itchy & Scratchy Land"
- "Grampa vs. Sexual Inadequacy"
- "Bart vs. Australia"

Season 7

- "Who Shot Mr. Burns? (Part 2)"
- "Bart Sells His Soul"
- "Two Bad Neighbors"
- "The Day the Violence Died"
- "Homerpalooza"

=== Futurama episodes ===
- "Kif Gets Knocked Up a Notch"
- "The Why of Fry"

=== King of the Hill episodes ===
- "Pilot"
- "I Remember Mono"
- "Death and Texas"
- "To Kill a Ladybird"
- "Queasy Rider"
- "The Incredible Hank"

=== The Goode Family episodes ===
- "Pilot"

=== Bob's Burgers episodes ===
- "Hamburger Dinner Theater"
- "Spaghetti Western and Meatballs"
- "Bob Day Afternoon"
- "Beefsquatch"
- "Tina-Rannosaurus Wrecks"
- "Nude Beach"
- "Two for Tina"
- "The Unnatural"

=== Allen Gregory episodes ===
- "Full Blown Maids"

=== Rick and Morty episodes ===
- "A Rickle in Time"
- "Get Schwifty"
- "The Wedding Squanchers"

=== Disenchantment episodes ===
- "The Princess of Darkness"
- "Dreamland Falls"
- "Our Bodies, Our Elves"
