= O.T.: The Outside Toilet =

- Bob's Burgers episode
- Episode no.: Season 3 Episode 15
- Directed by: Anthony Chun
- Written by: Lizzie Molyneux; Wendy Molyneux
- Production code: 3ASA02
- Original air date: March 3, 2013

Guest appearances
- Pamela Adlon as Olsen Benner; Neil Flynn as Max Flush; David Herman as Mr. Frond; Laura Silverman as Andy; Sarah Silverman as Ollie; Bobby Tisdale as Zeke; Jon Hamm as toilet (uncredited)

Episode chronology
← Previous "Lindapendent Woman"	Next → "Topsy"
- Bob's Burgers season 3

"O.T.: The Outside Toilet" is the 15th episode of the third season of the animated comedy series Bob's Burgers and the overall 37th episode, and is written by Lizzie and Wendy Molyneux and directed by Anthony Chun. It aired on Fox in the United States on March 3, 2013. This also marks the first episode that Larry Murphy was credited as Teddy in the main cast instead of a guest appearance.

== Plot ==
The episode starts with a wooden crate falling off a truck and onto a cliff, where it breaks, and its contents start to glow. Bob has to go to court to contest a parking ticket and borrows Mort's client's suit, which was left behind at the funeral home. Meanwhile, Gene, who is demoralized when already failing a health assignment, discovers a talking toilet in the woods – capable of warming the seat and telling jokes, among other things – as he is on his way home. Gene shows his siblings the toilet, where he finds out that its battery is almost drained and needs charging.

The driver of the truck finds and tracks Gene back to the restaurant, where Bob and Linda are on their way to celebrate the dismissal of his ticket, mostly due to how "rich" he looks in the said suit. The truck driver, who introduces himself as Max Flush, announces that his toilet costs $14,000 and that he's very motivated to locate it. When Gene refuses to tell him the location of the toilet, he stakes out the restaurant. The kids enlist the help of the Pesto children and Zeke to transfer the toilet to a safer place. Meanwhile, Bob and Linda go to a fancy restaurant where Bob and "his suit" are being sent free drinks by the other patrons, and get drunk to the point that they have forgotten how to order food. They find Gene and the battery-drained toilet on the road and they go to a coffee shop, where Max Flush finds them and is revealed to be a toilet thief, he then tries to escape but is foiled by the kids and arrested. The toilet is brought back to its owner in King's Head Island after a tearful goodbye with Gene, while Bob is forced to return the suit after the client's living relative catches him wearing it.

== Reception ==
Rowan Kaiser of The A.V. Club gave the episode a A−, saying "Everything worked about "O.T. the Outside Toilet." I'm not sure I want Bob's Burgers to always remind me so much of The Simpsons, but I could be persuaded if it was always this good." Ross Bonaime of Paste gave the episode an 8.4, saying "The two stories combine in a perfect way, with the drunk Belcher parents helping Gene with his toilet friend, but they're too drunk to quite comprehend what's going on, and Gene eventually has to say goodbye to his best toilet/friend. It's all insane, but kind of sweet too, especially when Bob has an awkward heart-to-heart with Gene, and the entire family rises up to help Gene in his time of need. Once again, Bob's Burgers gets some of the best voice acting on TV as well, as Hamm is great as the toilet, constantly misunderstanding Gene's commands, like when Gene tells him "I love you," and Hamm responds, "you have to throw up?" It's the perfect balance of weirdness and heart that Bob's Burgers excels at."

The episode received a 1.7 rating and was watched by a total of 3.67 million people. This made it the fourth most watched show on Animation Domination that night, beating The Cleveland Show but losing to The Simpsons.
