= The Unbearable Like-Likeness of Gene =

- Bob's Burgers episode
- Episode no.: Season 3 Episode 8
- Directed by: Don MacKinnon
- Written by: Holly Schlesinger
- Production code: 2ASA16
- Original air date: December 9, 2012

Guest appearances
- Kurt Braunohler as Doctor; Melissa Galsky as Julie; John Michael Higgins as Doug Wheeler; Andy Kindler as Mort; Larry Murphy as Gretchen; Kulap Vilaysack as Rupa; David Wain as Courtney Wheeler

Episode chronology
← Previous "Tinarannosaurus Wrecks"	Next → "God Rest Ye Merry Gentle-Mannequins"
- Bob's Burgers season 3

"The Unbearable Like-Likeness of Gene" is the eighth episode of the third season of the animated comedy series Bob's Burgers. The episode originally aired on Fox in the United States on December 9, 2012. The episode centers around Gene Belcher as he attempts to end an undesirable relationship with his irritating female classmate Courtney. However, when he learns that Courtney's father Doug is a jingle writer who owns several electronic musical instruments, he decides to stay in the relationship, hoping that Doug will be able to start Gene a music career of his own. A subplot involves Linda Belcher attempting to lose weight by following a diet consisting solely of fruit and vegetable peels.

"The Unbearable Like-Likeness of Gene" was written by Holly Schlesinger and directed by Don MacKinnon. Critics reacted positively towards the episode. On the episodes original broadcast, the Nielsen ratings reported an audience of 4.55 million viewers. In addition from the regular cast, "The Unbearable Like-Likeness of Gene" features guest stars David Wain as Courtney and John Michael Higgins as Doug. It also includes guest appearances by Kurt Braunohler, Kulap Vilaysack, Melissa Galsky, Andy Kindler, and Larry Murphy.

== Plot ==
While at school, Gene learns that a girl named Courtney, who he finds irritating, is infatuated with him. While surrounded by her and her friends, Gene is pressured into pretending that he shares her feelings. As Courtney believes they are in a relationship, she constantly spends time around Gene, which irritates him. Gene finds himself unable to end his relationship with Courtney, and when he gets home, he complains about his situation to his parents, Linda and Bob, however, they do not see the problem. Later, Gene is invited on a double date to the movies with Courtney and her friend, and Bob drives them. After Courtney repeatedly kicks Bob's seat during the drive, Bob begins to agree that Courtney is irritating and that Gene should break up with her.

After practicing terminating a relationship with his sisters Louise and Tina, Gene makes his way over to Courtney's house to talk to her. However, he is instead greeted by her father Doug, who is a jingle writer. Impressed by Doug's collection of electronic musical instruments, he decides to stay in the relationship in order to use the equipment, thinking Doug will sign him a record deal. At Courtney's birthday party, he decides to sing a jingle he wrote to impress Doug, but, when he finally performs, Courtney continuously interrupts him. Gene loses his patience and yells at Courtney to stop interrupting. After Gene finishes, she begins to stop breathing, leaving her in the hospital. Gene visits her in her room, and apologizes for shouting. He finally breaks up with her. Gene asks Doug if he can continue to visit to use his equipment, but Doug says no.

In a subplot, Linda decides to go on a diet after a visit from her stylist Gretchen, who has recently lost weight. She picks a diet that involves solely eating the skins of fruits and vegetables. She becomes increasingly sour as her diet progresses, and eventually gives up after learning she has not lost any weight.

== Production ==
"The Unbearable Like-Likeness of Gene" was written by series regular Holly Schlesinger and directed by Don MacKinnon. It is the first episode of the season to be written by Schlesinger and is also the first episode of the season to be directed by MacKinnon. The episode, produced as part of the second season production cycle, was executive produced by series creator Loren Bouchard and series developer Jim Dauterive. Jon Schroeder served as producer for "The Unbearable Like-Likeness of Gene," while Bernard Derriman served as supervising director.

The episode guest stars comedian and actor David Wain as Courtney, the student who is infatuated with Gene. Series creator Loren Bouchard praised Wain's performance as Courtney, stating that "he did such a good, funny, weird job." During the writing of the episode, the staff attempted to find a trait in Courtney that would convince people that Courtney was irritating and that Gene would have to convince himself to like her. Holly Scheslinger came up with the idea of Courtney constantly sucking on her necklace, which was used as the trait in the episode. Wain, who recorded his scenes in New York City, had to bite on a pen to replicate the sound of Courtney chewing, which Bouchard described as "a little bit of studio magic."

In addition to Wain, the episode features several other guest stars. John Michael Higgins voiced Courtney's father, Doug. On Higgins' performance, Bouchard said that "I think he did such a fantastic job with that guy. Just dorky and proud of his gear." Other guest stars include Kurt Braunohler as the doctor at the hospital, Melissa Galsky as Julie, and Kulap Vilaysack as Rupa. Recurring voice actor Larry Murphy provided the voice of Gretchen and Teddy, while recurring guest star Andy Kindler provided the voice of Mort.

== Reception ==
"The Unbearable Like-Likeness of Gene" was first broadcast on December 9, 2012, as part of Fox's Animation Domination programming block, and was preceded by the premiere of the Simpsons episode "The Day the Earth Stood Cool" and was followed by the premiere of the Family Guy episode "Friends Without Benefits." According to Nielsen ratings, "The Unbearable Like-Likeness of Gene" was watched by a total of 4.55 million U.S. viewers. It was the least watched episode to premiere that night on Animation Domination. The episode also acquired a 2.1/5 rating in the 18–49 demographic group, receiving the lowest rating of the night.

Reviews of the episode were mostly positive. Rowan Kaiser of The A.V. Club wrote of the episode, "Being "real" is also one of the episode's bigger weaknesses." She continued, "I worried a little bit last week that focusing on the kids growing up might cause them to lose some of their anarchic power, and that's certainly the case here. I found "The Unbearable Like-Likeness Of Gene" to be fairly sweet and subdued for a Bob's Burgers. This isn't a bad thing. But I'm not sure it plays to Bob's chaotic strengths, like the scene where the kids charged into the bedroom last week, or pretty much all of "Art Crawl/" She ultimately graded the episode as a B+. Ross Bonaime of Paste wrote positively about the episode, saying, "This week's Gene-centric episode isn't as great as Tina's brilliant driving mishap, but the two work well together under the theme of the children growing up and the entire family having to deal with their decisions and problems." He continued, "I like that the Belchers are calmer this week, dealing with Gene's problem and helping each other out." He also noted that the scene where Gene and Bob talk at the movie theater "might [be] one of my personal favorite moments in the show’s history." However, he criticized the subplot, saying that "it doesn't really go anywhere." He gave the episode an 8.1 out of 10.
