= My Fuzzy Valentine =

- Bob's Burgers episode
- Episode no.: Season 3 Episode 13
- Directed by: Boohwan Lim; Kyounghee Lim
- Written by: Dan Fybel; Rich Rinaldi
- Production code: 3ASA01
- Original air date: February 10, 2013

Guest appearances
- Gary Cole as Sergeant Bosco; David Herman as Bartender; Andy Kindler as Mort; Ron Lynch as Ron; Tim Meadows as Mike; Sam Seder as Hugo; Lindsey Stoddart as Gina

Episode chronology
← Previous "Broadcast Wagstaff School News"	Next → "Lindapendent Woman"
- Bob's Burgers season 3

"My Fuzzy Valentine" is the 13th episode of the third season of the animated comedy series Bob's Burgers and the overall 35th episode. It was written by Dan Fybel and Rich Rinaldi, and directed by Boohwan Lim and Kyounghee Lim. It aired on Fox in the United States on February 10, 2013.

== Plot ==
It's a rainy Valentine's Day and while Linda gushes about the love-filled holiday, Tina refuses to go to school after getting a Valentine the previous year from Jimmy Jr. signed "from" instead of "love". Despite the other kids wanting to join Tina in staying home from school, Bob cajoles them into going and offers to drive them. On the drive over, Bob gloats about the heart-shaped pancakes he made for Linda, but his kids don't think much of it, claiming he uses the same boring heart theme over and over.

The kids seem to be right as Linda sighs about the usual heart-shaped pancake to Mort and Teddy back at the diner. She tries to cheer herself up with a little song about love, but Mort and Teddy mention they don't have any valentines. That inspires Linda to set them up with dates via speed dating. Bob is at the school, ready to drop off the kids, when Louise mentions that they know what Linda would love (a specific figurine) and are willing to help him get it personally. Bob leaves the school and takes the kids to the mall to help him pick out a figurine for Linda.

At the mall, it's apparent the kids don't know exactly which fancy "Grazielda" figurine their mother would like, and Bob is upset they tricked him into letting them skip school. When he finds out the "cheapest" figurine is $250, he leaves the store. He passes a phone cover kiosk and thinks he can buy something quick and get the kids back to school, albeit late. Louise, Gene, and Tina quickly berate him on his lack of romance, and Bob relates the story of his and Linda's first Valentine's Day. He packed a picnic, but his car died on the way to their spot. While the car was being repaired, they went into a bar and used a love tester machine. The machine pinged them as "red hot", she kissed him, and that was when he knew they were in love. The kids push for him to go all the way to the bar and purchase the love tester machine, distracting him when he mentions taking them back to school.

Bob gets to the bar only to find out the love tester machine has long since been sold, but Health Inspectors Hugo and Ron pop up to inform him they know who bought the machine because they're planning to inspect the place that has it. When Hugo finds out Bob wants to buy it for Linda, Hugo refuses to tell them where the love tester is, so Bob and the kids follow him on his inspection route. They try to break into Hugo's inspection van to get his clipboard of places he's investigating, and after some bickering, Ron shows up and offers them a copy of the list. Bob drives to several restaurants and ends up at an Asian lounge. He finally finds the love tester machine, only to discover that Hugo has purchased it out from under him.

After a somewhat heartfelt plea, Hugo opts to sell the love tester to Bob for $500, five times what Hugo paid. Bob ultimately forks over the cash and starts talking about how he carved his and Linda's initials in the machine when he discovers the initials don't match. It turned out he was remembering a Valentine's Day with an old girlfriend he had dated before he met Linda. Bob desperately tries to get his money back, but Hugo laughs and declares no refunds.

Meanwhile, Linda cycles through one-minute conversations and speed hand-holding during her little Valentine event when Sergeant Bosco stops by to inform her that someone robbed a nearby jewelry store. When Linda finds out the sergeant is divorced, she drags him into the speed dating mix. However, the sergeant soon hijacks the event by having everyone say a dark secret, reasoning that if you know someone's worst stuff and can handle it, then you have a shot at staying together. Linda vehemently disagrees with all the negativity and secret spilling (something everyone is eager to do), which ultimately ends with her snatching the sergeant's gun, thinking that "symbol of authority" is the only reason her speed dating participants listened to him over her.

Bob and the kids arrive with the love tester just in time to see Linda get arrested for grabbing the sergeant's firearm. She laments her mistake but asks where Bob's been this whole time. When she hears the whole story about the kids playing hooky and Bob spending so much time and effort on something he thought she'd love, she declares it "so romantic" and the best Valentine's ever.

The sergeant gets a tip about the jewelry thief (a fake tip given by Louise) and opts to uncuff Linda and join the pursuit. Jimmy Jr. stops by the diner to give Tina the homework she missed and a Valentine's card. After much groaning and fretting, Tina finds the inside is signed with a heart (♡) instead of "from". Teddy also manages to get a phone number out of the whole thing, so overall it was a successful Valentine's Day for all.

== Reception ==
Rowan Kaiser of The A.V. Club gave the episode a B+, saying "This wasn't the funniest episode of Bob's Burgers, but it had its moments of hilarity combined with a tremendous charm. The show’s hot streak continues, holiday after holiday." The episode received a 1.8 rating and was watched by a total of 3.45 million people. This made it the fourth most watched show on Animation Domination that night, beating The Cleveland Show but losing to Family Guy.
