= Family Fracas =

- Bob's Burgers episode
- Episode no.: Season 3 Episode 19
- Directed by: Don MacKinnon
- Written by: Holly Schlesinger
- Production code: 3ASA06
- Original air date: April 14, 2013

Guest appearances
- Samantha Bee as Pam; David Herman as Announcer; Rob Huebel as Harry; Jay Johnston as Jimmy Pesto; Thomas Lennon as Chuck; Laura Silverman as Andy; Sarah Silverman as Ollie; Bobby Tisdale as Zeke

Episode chronology
← Previous "It Snakes a Village"	Next → "The Kids Run the Restaurant"
- Bob's Burgers season 3

"Family Fracas" is the 19th episode of the third season–and the 41st episode overall–of the animated comedy series Bob's Burgers. It was written by Holly Schlesinger and directed by Don MacKinnon. It aired on Fox in the United States on April 14, 2013.

== Plot ==
While the Belchers are on their way to the movie theater, their car breaks down and Jimmy Pesto takes advantage of the situation to mock Bob relentlessly. Leaving the car at the roadside, they decide instead to see the taping of a television show at the local studio. Bob runs across Chuck Charles, with whom he has a history (see "Beefsquatch"), and who is now the host of Family Fracas, a game show styled after Double Dare that offers a new minivan as its grand prize. Over Chuck's objections, and spurred on by Linda and the kids, Bob agrees to let his family compete against the reigning champions.

The Belchers win game after game, to Chuck's dismay, but receive only a 5-gallon bucket of "Fracas Foam" (an orange slimy substance dumped onto the losing family) after each victory due to Louise's spinning of the prize wheel. Jimmy and his family challenge and defeat them, winning the minivan, and the Belchers return home. Watching a viral video of the final round, Bob becomes convinced that Chuck rigged it in Jimmy's favor and confronts Harry, the producer of Family Fracas. Harry arranges for the Belchers to sue Jimmy and Chuck on Pam's Court, a court show presided over by Chuck's bitter ex-wife Pam.

Bob has no direct evidence of any cheating until Gene realizes that an overhead camera in the Family Fracas studio may have recorded it. Pam orders Chuck to bring in the videotape from that camera, but he destroys it instead, not wanting his show to be cancelled as was the one he and Pam had hosted together. Without any evidence to support Bob's claims, Pam is forced to rule in favor of Jimmy and Chuck. As the Belchers walk home from the studio, they find Jimmy trying in vain to change a flat tire on his new minivan. Bob decides to help, despite mockery from both Jimmy and the rest of the Belchers.

== Reception ==
Rowan Kaiser of The A.V. Club gave the episode a B−, saying "The inability for the Belchers to make progress renders "Family Fracas" relatively disappointing overall. Although it certainly has its funny moments, they don't coalesce into a full episode because the failures become so predictable. The Belchers may deserve fame, and fame could even be good for them in their world, but it's best for us viewers in our world that they stay unrecognized in theirs." The episode received a 1.6 rating and was watched by a total of 3.45 million people. This made it the fourth most watched show on Animation Domination that night, beating The Cleveland Show but losing to Family Guy.
