= Mother Daughter Laser Razor =

- Bob's Burgers episode
- Episode no.: Season 3 Episode 10
- Directed by: Jennifer Coyle
- Written by: Nora Smith
- Production code: 2ASA15
- Original air date: January 6, 2013

Guest appearances
- Kurt Braunohler as Logan; Brooke Dillman as Jamie Lee Curtis; Tim Heidecker as Dakota; Larry Murphy as Teddy; Lindsey Stoddart as Cynthia

Episode chronology
← Previous "God Rest Ye Merry Gentle-Mannequins"	Next → "Nude Beach"
- Bob's Burgers season 3

"Mother Daughter Laser Razor" is the tenth episode of the third season of the animated comedy series Bob's Burgers and the overall 32nd episode, and is written by Nora Smith and directed by Jennifer Coyle. It aired on Fox in the United States on January 6, 2013.

== Plot ==
After washing the dishes, Linda then sets up and prepares for a Family Game Night. The Family Game Night at the Belcher's home quickly ends with a shouting match between Linda and Louise, after Louise and her siblings claim that they're in the middle of a game they call "Stone the Witch" that Linda "mommed all up" upon entering the room. That night, the former goes to a "mommy blog", run by Dakota Applebaum, to gather some ideas as to how to get closer to her youngest child, since she realizes that Louise favors Bob over her. When a series of attempts to get closer to Louise fails, Linda tricks her into attending a Mother-Daughter seminar, which Cynthia and Logan are also attending. Louise is not willing to attend the seminar, nor make it easy for Linda, as Louise extorts money from Linda throughout the whole event, which eventually leads to yet another shouting match between Louise and Linda after they both refuse to cooperate during the mother-daughter role rehearsal, which causes Linda to become fed up with Louise's frequent extortion and refuses to pay her for role rehearsal as result. When Dakota learns that Linda has been paying Louise to attend the seminar due to it being the only way she could get her to attend, Dakota makes Linda a contender for the "Most Valuable Mommy Award" after the seminar is over. Louise and Logan also manage to anger Dakota, who locks them in a room with the movie Freaky Friday playing on loop.

Meanwhile, Tina overhears a couple of schoolmates gossip over another girl's leg hair while taking orders at the restaurant. This makes her conscious of her own, and wants to get rid of it. When Linda fails to shave Tina's legs because of her frustrations with Louise, after failing to shave her legs herself, Tina asks Bob to shave her legs instead. Bob brings her to a waxing salon but Tina's fear over the pain forces him to have his legs waxed as well. On the way back however, Gene gets jealous and the three turn around and head back to the salon to get waxed too.

Back at the seminar, Louise starts to get frustrated over her current situation and begins to lose patience with Logan when he almost succumbs to the movie's message. Louise thinks of a way to get herself and Logan out of the room and traps Dakota and the mothers in the seminar closet as well. She and the other children go to the nearby laser tag arena. Linda and the rest kick their way out of the room and get into a fight with the children in the arena, where Louise reveals that she does not really hate her mother. Blaming her for ruining his seminar, Dakota "shoots" Louise and Linda "avenges" her daughter, showing her fun side.

After getting her legs waxed, Tina realizes that she has succumbed to peer pressure and that she has "killed" her tiny leg hairs. After the day at the salon is over, Gene and Bob's legs end up getting itchy because of the procedure.

== Reception ==
Rowan Kaiser from The A.V. Club gave the episode an A, saying "In order to work as well as it does, Bob's Burgers has to have five things in place: it needs an episodic storyline that gets the two Belchers into a situation where this is plausible. It needs to have a strong enough character base for Linda that Louise can imitate her well, and also that Linda would get so caught up that she couldn't help but play along. The "songs" themselves need to be funny. The animation needs to be good enough to convey the mockery. Finally, the voice actors need to be excellent. Bob’s Burgers had all those things tonight. It’s not the first time that it’s happened. And it looks like Bob's Burgers is getting to the point where it can pull this off on a regular basis."

Ross Bonaime of Paste gave the episode an 8.9 out of 10, saying "Mother Daughter Laser Razor" is just phenomenal in how it blends its two main stories, having both parents reinforce how they care for their kids, while not making it too overwhelming. Bob’s Burgers is setting the bar for itself for 2013 pretty high, but the show has proven that just when you think it can’t get better, it most certainly will." The episode received a 3.1 rating and was watched by a total of 6.40 million people. This made it the third most watched show on Animation Domination that night, beating American Dad!, but losing to Family Guy and The Simpsons with 8.97 million.
