= Carpe Museum =

- Bob's Burgers episode
- Episode no.: Season 3 Episode 22
- Directed by: Tyree Dillihay
- Written by: Jon Schroeder
- Production code: 3ASA09
- Original air date: May 5, 2013

Guest appearances
- Brooke Dillman as Madeline Greenberg; Jim Gaffigan as Henry Haber; David Herman as Mr. Frond; Brian Huskey as Regular Sized Rudy; Andy Kindler as Mort; Laura Silverman as Andy Pesto; Sarah Silverman as Ollie Pesto; Bobby Tisdale as Zeke

Episode chronology
← Previous "Boyz 4 Now"	Next → "The Unnatural"
- Bob's Burgers season 3

"Carpe Museum" is the 22nd episode of the third season of the animated comedy series Bob's Burgers and the overall 44th episode, and is written by Jon Schroeder and directed by Tyree Dillihay. It aired on Fox in the United States on May 5, 2013.

== Plot ==
The kids go on a school trip to the museum with Counselor Frond and Linda signs Bob up to be a chaperone. The kids are assigned their buddies: Gene with Zeke, Louise with Regular-Sized Rudy, and Tina with Henry Haber, another socially awkward student from Wagstaff. Gene and Zeke bond over looking for breasts in all the displays, while Tina and Henry try to teach each other how to be cool, as they both think the other is the dorkiest student in school. Eventually, they find out what the other is doing and decide to ask their classmates which one of them is the bigger dork but find they're pretty much tied in votes. In the end, Tina tries to give a speech where many people admit they're dorks in different ways but it sort of peters out and everyone leaves.

Louise, annoyed and bored about visiting the same old museum, decides to sneak into the closed Amazon-themed Room, along with her buddy Rudy. It soon becomes apparent to Bob what Louise did and he finds her in the Amazon room fairly quickly. She goads him into looking around before returning to the group and soon he's taking the two kids up some wall stairs and onto a tall viewing platform. Bob and Louise have a nice moment where Bob teases her about wanting to take over the family business and idolizing him, which Louise exasperatedly but unconvincingly denies. Rudy catches up to them at the top, wheezing, and reveals he's having an asthma attack. Having earlier abandoned his backpack (where his inhaler is located), and with their makeshift ladder removed by a guard, they're stuck high above the Amazon exhibit floor until Bob uses his vest as a makeshift zipline and glides down. He finds Rudy's backpack, gives him his inhaler, and hurries the kids back to the group just as they're boarding the school bus. On the bus, Bob once again asks Louise about her desire to run the restaurant; this time, Louise admits it and affectionately hugs Bob, with Rudy joining in.

Meanwhile, left alone at the restaurant, Linda gets sad because she feels like her children do not need her as much anymore. Teddy tells her to go be with her family, and she goes to the museum. However, she gets distracted by a group of museum employees picketing the place and decides to help them improve their chants. They're initially impressed with her rhymes, but Linda eventually goes overboard with the chanting (eventually devising chants that have nothing to do with their protesting) and the picketers chase her away in frustration.

== Reception ==
Pilot Viruet of The A.V. Club gave the episode a B+, reviewing it as a humorous continuation of the show's expansion into non-restaurant locations, but considered it inferior to the previous episode Boyz 4 Now with "many fewer laughs" comparatively.

The episode received a 1.7 rating and was watched by a total of 3.96 million people. This made it the fourth most watched show on Animation Domination that night, losing to American Dad! with 5.00 million.
