= An Indecent Thanksgiving Proposal =

- Bob's Burgers episode
- Episode no.: Season 3 Episode 5
- Directed by: Tyree Dillihay
- Written by: Lizzie Molyneux; Wendy Molyneux
- Production code: 2ASA19
- Original air date: November 18, 2012

Guest appearances
- Kevin Kline as Mr. Fischoeder; Lindsey Stoddart as Shelby

Episode chronology
← Previous "Mutiny on the Windbreaker"	Next → "The Deepening"
- Bob's Burgers season 3

"An Indecent Thanksgiving Proposal" is the fifth episode of the third season of the American animated comedy series Bob's Burgers. The episode originally aired on November 18, 2012, on Fox, drawing an audience of 3.94 million viewers.

Written by Lizzie and Wendy Molyneux, the episode sees Bob Belcher (H. Jon Benjamin) reluctantly agree to rent out his wife Linda (John Roberts) and their children Tina (Dan Mintz), Gene (Eugene Mirman), and Louise (Kristen Schaal) to the family's landlord Calvin Fischoeder (guest voiced by Kevin Kline), who wants them to pose as his own family to impress a former flame named Shelby (Lindsey Stoddart) at Thanksgiving dinner. As Thanksgiving goes by, Bob, who has also been hired to pose as Fischoeder's cook, begins to feel increasingly ignored by his family and ends up talking to the dinner turkey as his only companion.

Rowan Kaiser of The A.V. Club, in a complimentary review of the episode, described influences of American animated sitcom The Simpsons' holiday specials. The episode features "The Thanksgiving Song," an impromptu musical number sung by Linda, which was later covered by American indie rock band The National and cited by the Bob's Burgers writing staff as one of their favorite songs from the series.

== Plot ==
At the supermarket, Bob carefully deliberates over which turkey to buy for Thanksgiving dinner, eventually choosing one and naming it "Lance." Thanksgiving is Bob's favorite holiday, and over the years he has even formed certain rituals with his family—breaking a wishbone with Tina, practicing football tackles with Gene, playing "turkey CSI: Miami" with Louise, and finally giving a toast with the entire family. On the eve of the holiday, the Belchers' landlord Mr. Fischoeder approaches Bob and requests to borrow his family to pose as his own. Fischoeder wants to impress a former flame named Shelby, a professional sharpshooter and infamous homewrecker, who is visiting for Thanksgiving dinner. Bob is initially reluctant, but ultimately agrees when Fischoeder offers five months of free rent should the plan succeed.

On Thanksgiving, the family assume their roles as Fischoeder's family at his mansion. Fischoeder devises a system where he will give Tina, Gene, or Louise a ticket for each convincing performance as his child, with the child with the most by the end of the day winning a prize of his or her choice. Bob, who has been hired to pose as his cook, plans a schedule for each family member to visit him in the kitchen so as not to miss their respective Thanksgiving traditions. Shelby arrives and is convinced that the Belchers are Fischoeder's family, and the plan goes along well. Alone in the kitchen, Bob drinks absinthe to pass the time and in a hallucinatory state talks to the turkey as if it were his friend.

Determined to get the most tickets, Tina and Gene only briefly visit Bob, and Louise skips him altogether. When nobody visits Bob for his toast, he decides to give it himself at the dinner table, only for Fischoeder to block out his speech and his family to ignore him. The children give Fischoeder an embrace and Linda kisses him on the lips, causing Bob to finally snap. He lashes out at his family and runs away with the turkey, while Shelby pursues him with a shotgun in hand. She shoots at Bob, but "Lance" ends up taking the bullet and "dies" in a distraught Bob's arms. Linda, Tina, Gene, and Louise embrace Bob and apologize for ruining his Thanksgiving, revealing their ruse to Shelby, who appreciates Fischoeder's gesture but ultimately rejects him. The next day, the Belchers hold a make-up Thanksgiving celebration at home, and Louise wins a family portrait from Fischoeder.

== Production ==
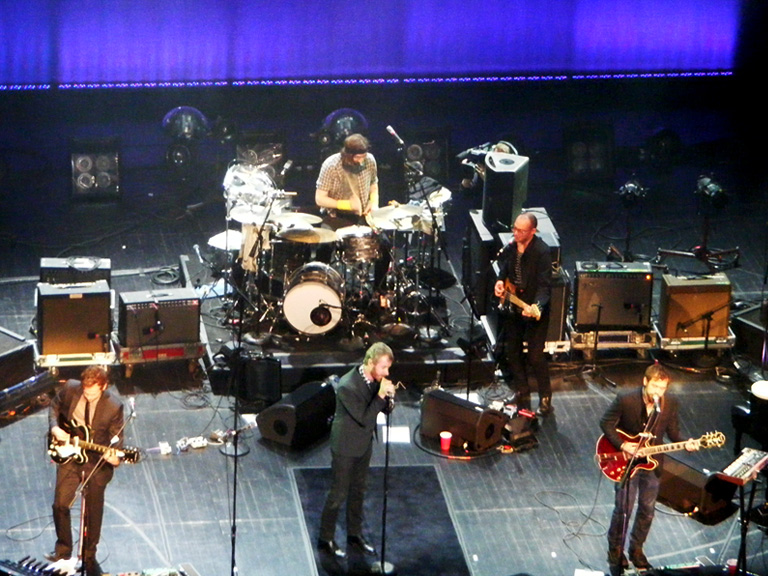
The National, who covered "The Thanksgiving Song" from the episode

"An Indecent Thanksgiving Proposal" was written by Lizzie and Wendy Molyneux and directed by Tyree Dillihay. Despite airing as a part of the show's third season, it was actually produced as the nineteenth episode of its second season, hence bearing the production code 2ASA19. Kevin Kline guest stars in the episode as recurring character Calvin Fischoeder, the Belcher family's landlord. Series voice actor H. Jon Benjamin first revealed details about the episode's plot, including Kline's appearance, in an interview with Entertainment Weekly in August 2012: "There's a good Thanksgiving one with Kevin Kline as the weird landlord with the eyepatch. It's funny, the family gets co-opted into pretending to be his family so that he can get laid."

The episode features a song entitled "The Thanksgiving Song", which is sung by the character Linda Belcher over the episode's ending credits. John Roberts, who voices Linda, improvised the entire song during the episode's recording. The Bob's Burgers writing staff later named it their fourth favorite song from the series. On November 16, 2012, American indie rock band The National released a slower, more downbeat cover of the song on New York magazine's website Vulture, having been approached by the producers of Bob's Burgers to record a re-worked version. The following year, The National contributed a version of the song "Sailors in Your Mouth" for the fourth season Thanksgiving special "Turkey in a Can".

== Reception ==
"An Indecent Thanksgiving Proposal" first aired in the United States on November 18, 2012, on Fox, as a part of the Animation Domination programming block. The episode was watched by 3.94 million viewers and received a 1.8/4 Nielsen rating in the 18–49 demographic, becoming the fourth most-watched program of the Animation Domination block for the night.

Rowan Kaiser of The A.V. Club gave the episode an A− grade, stating that the episode followed The Simpsons' "great model for how to both subvert and respect common television tropes" in holiday specials. Kaiser opined that episode contained influences of "great Simpsons [holiday] episodes", citing "Bob's obliviousness to his family's ambivalence toward something he loves, his caddishness when he doesn't get what he wants, the family's easy corruptibility, and the resolution of them embracing their weirdness over that corruption" as recognizable examples. Jen Johnson, writing for Den of Geek, felt that "An Indecent Thanksgiving Proposal" was "not one of the [series'] funnier episodes" but was nonetheless "funny in a twisted sort of way", praising how the Thanksgiving theme was carried out.
