= It Snakes a Village =

- Bob's Burgers episode
- Episode no.: Season 3 Episode 18
- Directed by: Jennifer Coyle
- Written by: Kit Boss
- Production code: 3ASA05
- Original air date: March 24, 2013

Guest appearances
- David Herman as Narrator; Linda Lavin as Helen; Sam Seder as Al; Renée Taylor as Gloria

Episode chronology
| ← Previous "Two for Tina" | Next → "Family Fracas" |
- Bob's Burgers season 3

"It Snakes a Village" is the 18th episode of the third season of the animated comedy series Bob's Burgers and the overall 40th episode. The episode was written by Kit Boss and directed by Jennifer Coyle. It aired on Fox in the United States on March 24, 2013.

== Plot ==
While the restaurant and the house are being fumigated, the Belchers decide to visit Linda's parents retirement community in Florida. Much to the kids' dismay, the retirement community pool is closed for cleaning and they have to find new ways to entertain themselves. Linda discovers that the community is for retirees who participate in swinging. Linda's parents decided to participate beforehand, but her father Al backs out for an unknown reason. Because of this, the homeowners' association are going to kick them out for "failure to perform" in the parties and other activities.

Bob decides to help the couple when Linda offers Al and Gloria residence in their own home. He talks to Al about the latter's insecurities, and finds out that what turns him on is a woman popping a balloon, which presents a problem since Gloria gets startled by sudden, loud noises. Bob makes Gloria wear ear plugs and sends them to the pot luck to participate and not get kicked out of the community.

Meanwhile, the kids get hired by a woman in the same village to hunt and take a picture of a python residing in the village forest, which she believes is responsible for the loss of her dog Bitsy. She offers them $100 and the kids decide to set up camp during the night, despite Gene's ophidiphobia. Tina and Louise end up hunting for the python alone, only to get trapped in quicksand. Gene decides to rescue them using a golf cart, and the kids find Bitsy alive. After a quick reunion with her owner, Bitsy runs back to the forest and to the python, who turn out to both be lovers.

== Reception ==
Rowan Kaiser of The A.V. Club gave the episode a B+, saying "It Snakes A Village" is, like Bob's behavior, effective and sweet. It builds the main characters a bit while widening its base to include Linda's parents as more than simple antagonists. Nothing special, but they can't all be special." Dyanamaria Leifsson of TV Equals said "Although there were plenty of lines in tonight's Bob's Burgers that made me chuckle, "It Snakes a Village" was one of the weaker episodes of this season. The Belchers will be the Belchers no matter where they travel, but pulling Bob and his family away from the restaurant and their hometown for an entire episode just didn't seem as fun as what we usually get when they’re dealing with the daily grind."

The episode received a 1.7 rating and was watched by a total of 3.76 million people. This made it the third most watched show on Animation Domination that night, beating a repeat of The Cleveland Show and The Simpsons but losing to Family Guy and American Dad!.

== Location ==
The location of the Belchers' hometown has never been explicitly stated, with creator Loren Bouchard calling it a "semi-Springfield." However, this episode shows the family leaving New Jersey, giving a concrete location for the first time in the series' history and keeping with Bouchard's vision of the setting as "firmly in the Northeast."
