= Bob Fires the Kids =

- Bob's Burgers episode
- Episode no.: Season 3 Episode 3
- Directed by: Boohwan Lim; Kyounghee Lim
- Written by: Lizzie Molyneux; Wendy Molyneux
- Production code: 2ASA12
- Original air date: November 4, 2012

Guest appearances
- Kevin Kline as Mr. Fischoeder; Doug Benson as stoner guy; Bill Hader as Mickey; David Herman as Marshmallow; Megan Mullally as Beverly; Larry Murphy as Teddy; Nick Offerman as Cooper

Episode chronology
← Previous "Full Bars"	Next → "Mutiny on the Windbreaker"
- Bob's Burgers season 3

"Bob Fires the Kids" is the third episode of the third season of the American animated comedy series Bob's Burgers. Written by Lizzie and Wendy Molyneux, the episode sees Bob Belcher (H. Jon Benjamin) firing his children Tina (Dan Mintz), Gene (Eugene Mirman), and Louise (Kristen Schaal) from the family restaurant for the summer, not wanting to deprive them of normal childhood experiences as his own father did. However, when the children grow bored of summer activities, they seek employment at a local farm, which unbeknownst to them grows marijuana.

The episode also sees the return of the bank robber Mickey, voiced by guest actor Bill Hader, who is hired by Bob at the restaurant in his children's absence. Other guest voice actors include Megan Mullally and Nick Offerman of the American comedy television series Parks and Recreation as the hippie farming couple Beverly and Cooper, Doug Benson as an undercover Drug Enforcement Administration agent, and Kevin Kline as recurring series character Calvin Fischoeder.

After its original scheduled air date was preempted by Fox for a National League Championship Series broadcast, the episode aired on the network on November 4, 2012. It was watched by 3.92 million viewers and received positive reviews from critics, who praised its combination of subplots involving the Belcher parents and children and the incorporation of the character Mickey; positive comparisons to The Simpsons were also drawn.

== Plot ==
Bob receives a package containing his childhood toys, which consist of nothing more than a scouring pad, a rusted spatula, and a dog-shaped soap bar. The toys make Bob recall memories of constantly working at his father's restaurant, and he realizes that his job deprived him of a normal childhood. Worried that he is doing the same to his own children, he fires Tina, Gene and Louise and encourages them to enjoy their summer vacation. In their place, he hires newly released bank robber Mickey, whom the family had previously befriended, to do various jobs around the restaurant, in exchange for free meals and shelter in the basement.

Meanwhile, the children find outdoor summer activities unsatisfying and soon grow bored. They later wander into a blueberry farm and meet its elderly owners, the hippie couple Beverly and Cooper, who offer to hire Gene and Louise to "pick weeds" and Tina as a blueberry delivery girl. With the promise of a daily $10 salary, the children accept and soon become unsuspecting accomplices in a marijuana delivery business. One night, Bob discovers Mickey making a hole in the basement, and Mickey reveals his plan to dig his way into the same bank he previously robbed, believing that the double jeopardy defense will clear him of any crime. Bob explains to Mickey that he can, in fact, be jailed again, and promptly fires him.

Bob attempts to rehire his children the next day, explaining that he now realizes that he is a better parent than his distant, alcoholic father, only to discover that they have found other work. A customer of the farm delivery service later walks into the restaurant looking for Tina, leaving behind a box of blueberries. Bob and his wife Linda discover marijuana hidden in the box and set off to find the children, with Mickey leading them to the farm's location. As they arrive and take back the children, a SWAT team – led by the aforementioned customer, who is actually an undercover DEA agent – shows up and arrests the hippies. The scene cuts to Wagstaff School, where Louise has narrated the episode's events to her class for her report on how she spent her summer vacation.

== Production ==
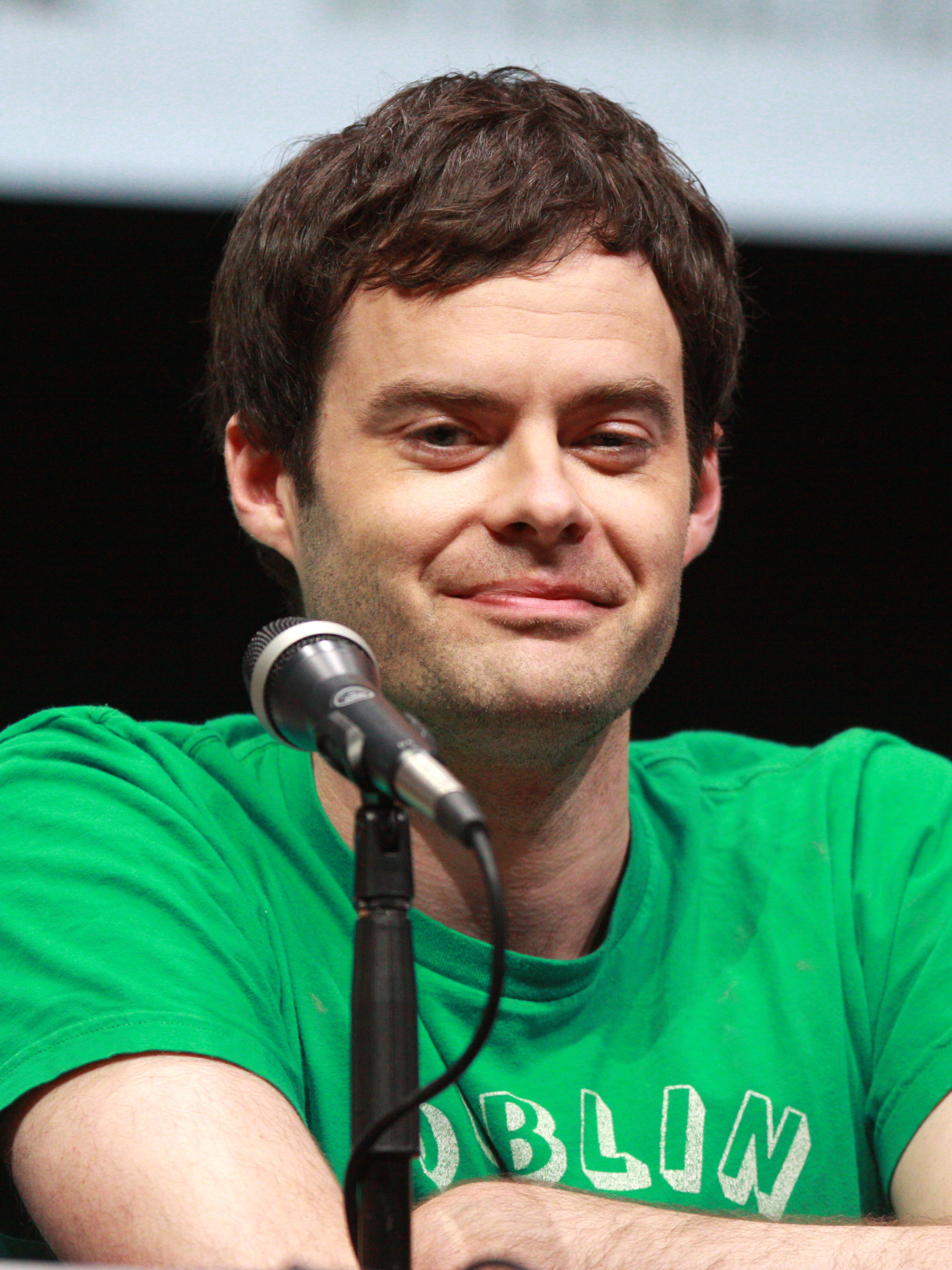
The episode marks the return of guest actor Bill Hader as Mickey.

"Bob Fires the Kids" was written by Lizzie and Wendy Molyneux, and directed by Boohwan and Kyounghee Lim. Despite airing as a part of the show's third season, it was actually produced as the twelfth episode of its second season, hence bearing the production code 2ASA12. The episode's title was first revealed in a February 2012 post on the official Bob's Burgers writers' blog alongside its accompanying script cover, designed by series storyboard artist Tony Gennaro.

The episode guest stars actor and comedian Bill Hader, reprising his role as the bank robber Mickey from the second-season episode "Bob Day Afternoon". Megan Mullally, who voices the character Aunt Gayle in the series, also makes a guest appearance in the episode with her husband and Parks and Recreation co-star Nick Offerman as the hippie couple Beverly and Cooper. Comedian Doug Benson voices an undercover DEA agent, while Kevin Kline voices recurring series character Calvin Fischoeder in a brief appearance.

During the recording of the episode, Hader ad-libbed calypso scat singing, which series creator Loren Bouchard cited as an "amazing [example of] when a person comes in and ad-libs music." Bouchard further stated: "There's something so musical about it and he's clearly so talented, but it's also silly and in character. It's nice to have your cake and eat it, too." Hader's singing is incorporated into a scene in the episode where Mickey sings while making a hole in Bob's basement wall, and is later reprised in the episode's end credits. The same scene sees Mickey attempting to cover up the hole with a Big film poster, which serves as a reference to the 1994 film The Shawshank Redemption.

== Reception ==
"Bob Fires the Kids" first aired in the United States on November 4, 2012, on Fox, as a part of the Animation Domination programming block. It had originally been scheduled to air on October 21, but was preempted for Fox's broadcast of game six of the 2012 National League Championship Series. The episode was watched by 3.92 million viewers and received a 1.8/4 Nielsen rating in the 18–49 demographic, becoming the fourth most-watched program of the Animation Domination block for the night. It was surpassed in ratings by Sunday Night Football and The Amazing Race, which aired on NBC and CBS respectively in the same time slot.

Rowan Kaiser of The A.V. Club gave "Bob Fires the Kids" a B+ rating, calling its premise and structure "reminiscent of classic Simpsons style" and writing that the episode "is effective because it doesn't just divide the kids and the parents: it sets them against one another." He added that while the main plot "loses some momentum at the conclusion, [the episode] keeps from sinking thanks to a steady stream of great lines going throughout." Kaiser concluded his review by stating that he was "perfectly happy to laugh throughout an episode as a fan, even though as a critic [he] might occasionally want just a little bit more."

Ross Bonaime of Paste wrote: "As great as an episode of Bob's Burgers can be when the kids and the adults are given their own separate stories... there's something much more rewarding about a storyline that combines the two groups in an almost Simpson-ian manner." He also praised the episode's guest voice actors, citing in particular Bill Hader's character Mickey as "very odd, but so much fun"; Bonaime gave "Bob Fires the Kids" an overall grade of 8.3 out of 10. Jen Johnson, writing for Den of Geek, also cited Mickey as a highlight of the episode, stating: "I would say that I hope this is the end of Mickey and the chaos he brings to the Belcher family, but [the episode] was just too much fun. I hope he comes back."
