= The Kids Run the Restaurant =

- Bob's Burgers episode
- Episode no.: Season 3 Episode 20
- Directed by: Boohwan Lim; Kyounghee Lim
- Written by: Steven Davis; Kelvin Yu
- Production code: 3ASA07
- Original air date: April 21, 2013

Guest appearances
- Kevin Kline as Mr. Fischoeder; David Herman as Marshmallow; Wendy Molyneux as Dottie Minerva; Johnny Pemberton as Dr. Eigerman; Samantha Shelton as Misty Gish; Laura Silverman as Andy; Sarah Silverman as Ollie; Bobby Tisdale as Zeke

Episode chronology
← Previous "Family Fracas"	Next → "Boyz 4 Now"
- Bob's Burgers season 3

"The Kids Run the Restaurant" is the 20th episode of the third season of the animated comedy series Bob's Burgers and the overall 42nd episode, and is written by Steven Davis and Kelvin Yu and directed by Boohwan Lim and Kyounghee Lim. It aired on Fox in the United States on April 21, 2013.

== Plot ==
While slicing tomatoes for burgers, Bob is distracted by his family's chaotic behavior and accidentally cuts his hand. Though the cut is small, Bob faints at the sight of his own blood and Linda must take him to the hospital, leaving the kids alone. The kids get bored of Tina's uninspired babysitting and decide to open the restaurant.

Gene envisions turning the restaurant into a fried chicken establishment called "McChicky's," while Tina envisions turning it into an organic health food restaurant. As such, they scare away customers craving burgers. Louise gets the idea to turn the restaurant basement into an underground casino, hiring Zeke as bouncer and the Pesto twins to spread the word. Tina becomes a waitress, and Gene assembles "The Cutie Patooties," a girl group he'd formed at school the previous day, to perform.

The casino quickly attracts both kids and adults, including numerous sailors, who gamble money on kids' games such as Surgery Sam (a parody of Operation) and rock-paper-scissors. Louise quickly becomes maniacal, abusing Tina and locking the Pesto twins in the walk-in cooler in their underwear to count money. Gene finds none of the members of the girl group can sing except "Girl #3," whom he'd designated as a backup singer. By the time Gene finds out Girl #3 can actually sing (and quite well), the Cutie Patooties decide to break up. Gene dons a wig to perform the song he'd written for the group himself.

Mr. Fischoeder, the landlord, arrives. The kids are initially terrified, but Fischoeder reveals himself to be a gambler and pumps massive amounts of money into the casino. He goes head-to-head repeatedly with Louise on rock-paper-scissors, causing Louise to lose large sums of money that Fischoeder presumes the "house" – Bob and Linda – owes him.

Meanwhile, at the hospital, Bob is assigned a first-time doctor who has never performed an operation without his supervisor. The doctor is so inexperienced he must watch an online video in order to figure out how to do stitches. Bob insists on leaving, but Linda – who feels motherly affection towards the young doctor – convinces him to stay.

Bob passes out and wakes up with his body shaved and his entire hand in a cast. After finding out the doctor filmed the entire operation on his phone, he convinces Linda to leave. Once in the car, Bob finds his wound is even worse than before and sprays blood all over the car. Linda drives him back to the hospital, where Bob is able to see a nurse.

The parents return home to a packed basement and Fischoeder demanding five thousand dollars. Louise gets the idea to have Bob and Fischoeder square off double or nothing in rock-paper-scissors; if Fischoeder wins, he gets double his winnings, but if Bob wins, the debt is cancelled. Louise knows Fischoeder will throw paper, not expecting Bob to be able to throw scissors due to his injured hand. She convinces Bob to throw scissors, opening his wound, in order to cancel the debt.

The two square off and Bob is able to throw scissors, splitting his stitches and spraying blood. Fischoeder leaves with no money as Linda drives Bob back to the hospital. The episode ends with Linda performing a musical number, "The Kids Run The Restaurant," with a chorus line of sailors.

== Reception ==
Rowan Kaiser of The A.V. Club gave the episode a B+, saying "As Bob's Burgers nears the end of its third season, the specific traits it adds to characters and setting will necessarily become critical parts of the stories moving forward, as will figuring out a way to balance the quirks of the characters with freedom of storytelling in each episode. But that's part of the fun of watching a show grow." Dyanamaria Leifsson of TV Equals said "Although Bob's original wound was pretty minor, this was a somewhat gory episode of Bob's Burgers. I happen to be one of those people that gets a good chuckle out of exaggerated and ridiculous blood splatter, so I couldn't help but laugh when Bob's finger wound sprayed blood all over Linda and the car, and later, Mr. Fischoeder and all the kids in his basement. Things never got so serious that we couldn't laugh at Bob's plight. I appreciated that all this gory humor came from the tiniest little cut, rather than having Bob lose a finger. Normally, blood and guts wouldn't seem to fit in with the Bob's Burgers comedy style, but it was done right here."

The episode received a 1.7 rating and was watched by a total of 3.74 million people. This made it the third most watched show on Animation Domination that night, beating The Cleveland Show and an encore of The Simpsons but losing to an encore of Family Guy.
