= Topsy (Bob's Burgers) =

- Bob's Burgers episode
- Gene dressed as Thomas Edison and Tina as Topsy, and Louise.
- Episode no.: Season 3 Episode 16
- Directed by: Tyree Dillihay
- Written by: Loren Bouchard; Nora Smith
- Production code: 3ASA03
- Original air date: March 10, 2013

Guest appearances
- Kevin Kline as Mr. Fischoeder; Megan Mullally as Gayle; Billy Eichner as Mr. Ambrose; Mark Proksch as Mr. Dinkler; Laura Silverman as Andy; Sarah Silverman as Ollie

Episode chronology
← Previous "O.T.: The Outside Toilet"	Next → "Two for Tina"
- Bob's Burgers season 3

"Topsy" is the 16th episode of the third season of the animated comedy series Bob's Burgers and the overall 38th episode, and is written by Loren Bouchard and Nora Smith and directed by Tyree Dillihay. It aired on Fox in the United States on March 10, 2013.

== Plot ==
It is the science fair at Wagstaff School, and Louise wants to use the same volcano she made last year, but her substitute teacher, Thomas Edison impersonator Mr. Dinkler, with his strict "no volcanoes" rule, demands that she make a project about Edison himself instead. After a tip-off by the school's librarian, she discovers Electrocuting an Elephant, the 1903 film shot by the Edison Studios of the electrocution of Topsy the Elephant. Louise decides to recreate the electrocution to spite Mr. Dinkler, with Tina playing Topsy and Gene as Edison, a role he accepts only after Louise allows him to write a musical number for it. Louise also convinces Teddy to make a Van de Graaff generator to create the sparks.

While writing the song, Gene discovers that he and Tina cannot sing, so they get Aunt Gayle and Mr. Fischoeder to provide the singing voices hiding behind a curtain while Gene and Tina lip sync; by this time, the song has become a love duet, much to Louise's annoyance, but she's delighted when Teddy's generator nearly electrocutes Tina. When Mr. Dinkler finds out, he bans her from the science fair, and allows Gene to turn his song, now called "Electric Love," into a large romantic musical number with a band and choir. At the climax of the song, Louise manages to sneak in and scream "this is what really happened," and orders Teddy to put as much power into the generator as possible. As the sparks fly, Tina appears to be electrocuted and passes out, but is unhurt, saying she "just went with it." After admitting to the fair's guests that Edison did electrocute animals, Mr. Dinkler runs off crying that he failed to protect Edison's good name. Louise apologizes to Tina for nearly killing her, and the curtain drops to reveal Gayle kissing Mr. Fischoeder.

In the episode's sub-plot, Bob rediscovers his invention, the "Spiceps," a pair of sleeves that serve as a wearable spice holder (a play on the word biceps). Linda thinks it's a good idea, but modifies it to create the "Spice Rack," which is worn on the person's chest like a brassiere and holds more spices than Bob's invention does. While trying to outdo one another, they bring both inventions to the science fair, presenting them as children's projects. The episode ends with the winner of the fair announced as "Spice...I can't read this," which prompts Bob and Linda to desperately claim the prize as theirs.

== Reception ==
Rowan Kaiser of The A.V. Club gave the episode a B, saying "A side plot involving Linda and Bob battling over the best science project for wearing spices proves amusing as well" in an episode that "may lead to great things eventually. It just doesn't quite have that greatness in it itself." Dyanamaria Leifsson of TV Equals said "The music in tonight's episode of Bob's Burgers was some of the best we've seen on the show thus far. "Electric Love" has been stuck in my head since the episode...." The episode received a Nielsen rating of 1.8 and was watched by a total of 3.85 million people. This made it the third most watched show on Animation Domination that night, beating The Cleveland Show and American Dad! but losing to Family Guy.
