= Tina-rannosaurus Wrecks =

- Bob's Burgers episode
- Tina attempts to drive the car, with Bob in the passenger seat.
- Episode no.: Season 3 Episode 7
- Directed by: Wes Archer
- Written by: Jon Schroeder
- Production code: 2ASA14
- Original air date: December 2, 2012

Guest appearances
- David Herman as Trev; Jay Johnston as Jimmy Pesto; Andy Kindler as Mort; Bob Odenkirk as Chase

Episode chronology
← Previous "The Deepening"	Next → "The Unbearable Like-Likeness of Gene"
- Bob's Burgers season 3

"Tina-rannosaurus Wrecks" is the seventh episode of the third season of the animated comedy series Bob's Burgers and the overall 29th episode, and is written by Jon Schroeder and directed by Wes Archer. It aired on Fox in the United States on December 2, 2012.

== Plot ==
As they are leaving the grocery store, Bob decides to teach Tina how to drive in the parking lot. Unfortunately, Tina accidentally hits another car which turns out to be Jimmy Pesto's, Bob's rival. Bob decides to lie about the accident, saying that it was him who was driving the car at the time. Tina becomes extremely uncomfortable about the lying, and she starts to believe that she is a jinx.

Mort the mortician offers to drive the family around while their car is at the shop. This proves inconvenient for him however, as the family goes to many places and is consuming much gas. He tries to confront the Belchers about this, but always fails to do so. Mort then finally finds the courage to tell the family how he feels, but then finds out that the car will be back tomorrow and Linda has already left a thank you package on his doorstep for his help.

The family meets Chase, an insurance adjuster who at first seemed like he believes the story Bob and Tina invented in order to get their insurance claim. He invites the family to cater a party at his house, where Tina (who was manning the grill) accidentally sets the house on fire. Tina gets nightmares from the lies and Bob finally decides to come clean to Chase and the rest of the family. When they arrive at his office however, Chase reveals that he knew the story was just invented, but he figured that if he helped the Belchers get their insurance claim, they could help him earn money by committing insurance fraud. He then admits that the fire was no accident: he used unscented gas to burn down the house. After refusing to go along with his crimes, Chase blackmails the two of them and he tells Tina that Bob could go to jail. He then says that they should flood their basement in order to file another insurance claim. The family then tries to trick Chase by making it look like the children drowned in the basement so he would leave them alone, but he sees through their lies and tells them that he wasn't letting go of them, since restaurants are magnets for accidents.

Bob thinks they will never be able to escape Chase, until Tina reveals that she used Gene's Casio keyboard to record Chase implicating himself in all the crimes. They send the keyboard to the FBI, and Chase gets caught. Tina finally lets go of the idea that she is a jinx, after she saves the family from Chase.

== Reception ==
Rowan Kaiser of The A.V. Club gave the episode a A, saying "This all adds up to an episode that got everything right, and when that's combined with two hilarious scenes and some better-than-normal character work, you have one of the best episodes Bob's Burgers has done… although it may have the worst title of the series." The episode received a 1.8 rating and was watched by a total of 3.97 million people. This made it the fourth most watched show on Animation Domination that night, beating The Cleveland Show but losing to The Simpsons with 4.38 million.
