= Lindapendent Woman =

- Bob's Burgers episode
- Episode no.: Season 3 Episode 14
- Directed by: Don MacKinnon
- Written by: Mike Benner
- Production code: 2ASA22
- Original air date: February 17, 2013

Guest appearances
- Todd Barry as Hummer Guy; Matt Besser as Greg; David Herman as Jamie; Andy Kindler as Mort; Tim Meadows as Mike; Larry Murphy as Teddy; Ben Schwartz as Josh

Episode chronology
← Previous "My Fuzzy Valentine"	Next → "O.T.: The Outside Toilet"
- Bob's Burgers season 3

"Lindapendent Woman" is the 14th episode of the third season of the animated comedy series Bob's Burgers and the overall 36th episode, and is written by Mike Benner and directed by Don MacKinnon. It aired on Fox in the United States on February 17, 2013.

== Plot ==
Bob and Linda try to think of ways to cut expenses. Linda decides to go shopping at Fresh Feed, a Trader Joe's-style grocery store, where after talking to the manager about the store gets a part-time job. Bob is not keen to the idea, but Linda is found to be excited at her job. She leaves Bob to run the place (poorly) on his own.

Meanwhile, the kids visit their mother at Fresh Feed, where Gene eats all the free samples of mini egg rolls, Louise ties frozen shrimp to balloons, and Tina decides to take a tour behind the dairy fridge, where she meets a boy whose finger got bitten by his turtle. Due to a call from his mother, the boy hastily leaves, and Tina is only able to grab the boy's bandage. Tina is determined to find him.

Curious about Linda's job, but at the same time not wanting to ask her, Bob keeps asking the kids about their mother, but sees that Linda deeply enjoys her work. Linda comes home one night, saying that she got high scores in her evaluation. Bob, in an effort to get her back to the restaurant, "evaluates" her as well but the couple ends up fighting. Linda announces that she might work at Fresh Feed full-time, while Bob bans the kids from going to the store in order to help him at the restaurant.

Due to her giving and almost doormat-like nature, Linda ends up unwittingly letting all of her co-workers take the day off, leaving her alone at the grocery store. She enlists the help of the kids, but ends up being terribly undermanned. Tina finally meets the boy with the turtle bite, Josh, and they end up kissing. Tina gives him her number before she and the rest of the family abandon the chaotic grocery store, much to the dismay of the manager who left Linda in charge in the first place.

== Reception ==
Pilot Viruet of The A.V. Club gave the episode a B+, saying "What I really liked about the episode is that it didn’t try to change Linda by having her put her foot down and try to prove she’s not just an overly nice pushover. Rather, Linda stayed true to her roots while also showing Bob why these traits are important to have and why it makes them work together so well, both as a couple and as co-workers in the restaurant." Dyanamaria Leifsson of TV Equals said this and last week's episode "featured a great sampling of strange Belcher songs. Bob’s Burgers can write a heck of a story, packed with brilliant one-liners, but they can also write a borderline annoying tune that makes you laugh and gets stuck in your head for weeks. I can’t help but love every bizarre song the Belchers sing, and after recently reading about 'Bob’s Buskers' I can only hope they keep those odd catchy tunes coming."

The episode received a 1.8 rating and was watched by a total of 3.93 million people. This made it the fourth most watched show on Animation Domination that night, beating The Cleveland Show but losing to Family Guy.
