= Table-setting =

Decorative arrangement of tableware

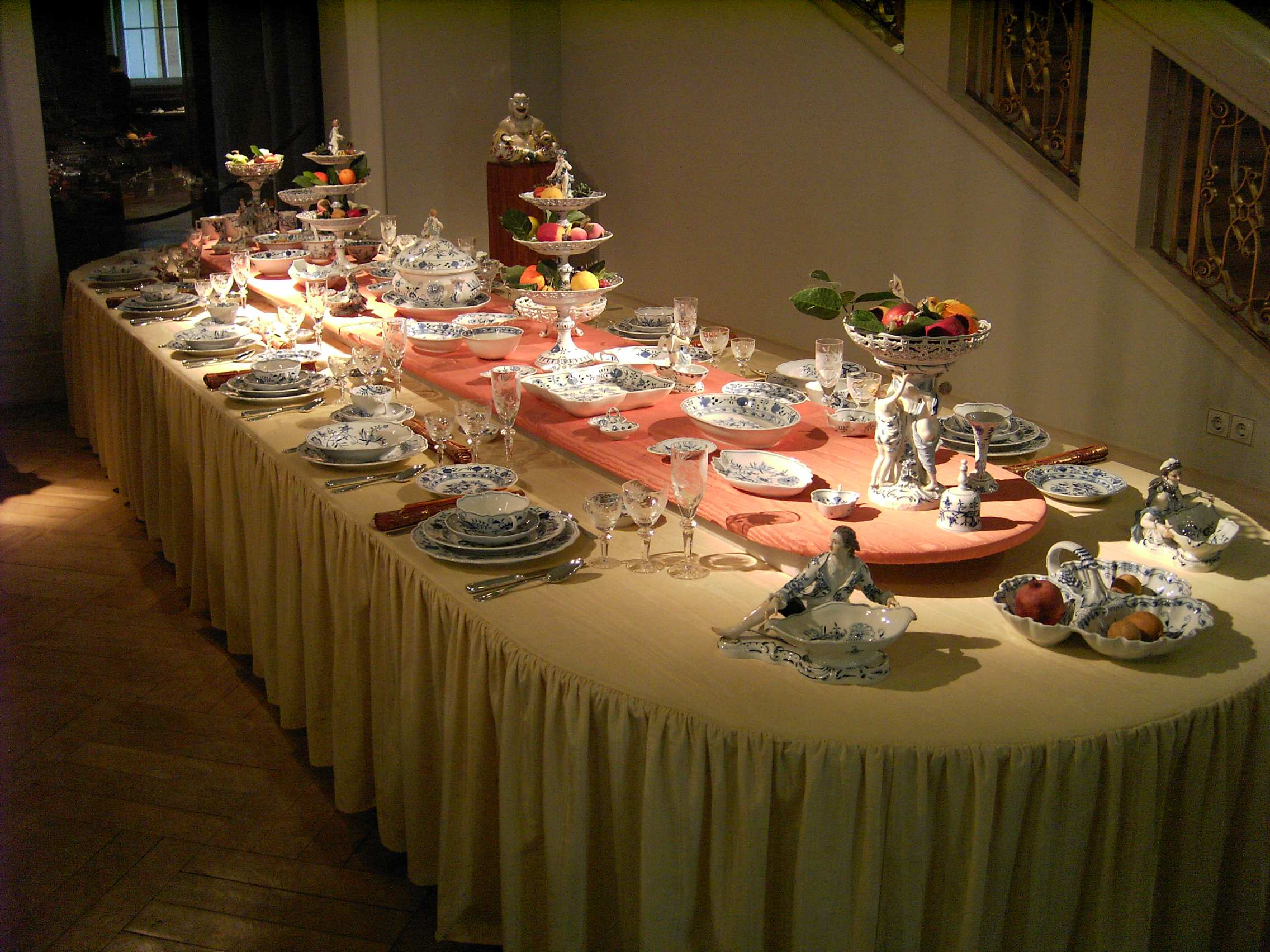
A grand table at the Meissen porcelain museum set for formal dining shows many elements; the food items are replicas, in tablescaping competitions perishable items are generally not allowed.

Table-setting, or tablescaping, is an activity involving the setting of sometimes elaborate dining tables in artful, decorative or themed ways for social events, and in a variety of categories for competitions and exhibitions.

Tablescaping can also refer to any decorative treatment for any flat surface in any room; these are often more permanent installations that will only change with the seasons or with a change of decor in the room.

In the United States and Australia there are formal tablesetting competitions and exhibitions that date back to the 1930s and 1940s.

== History ==
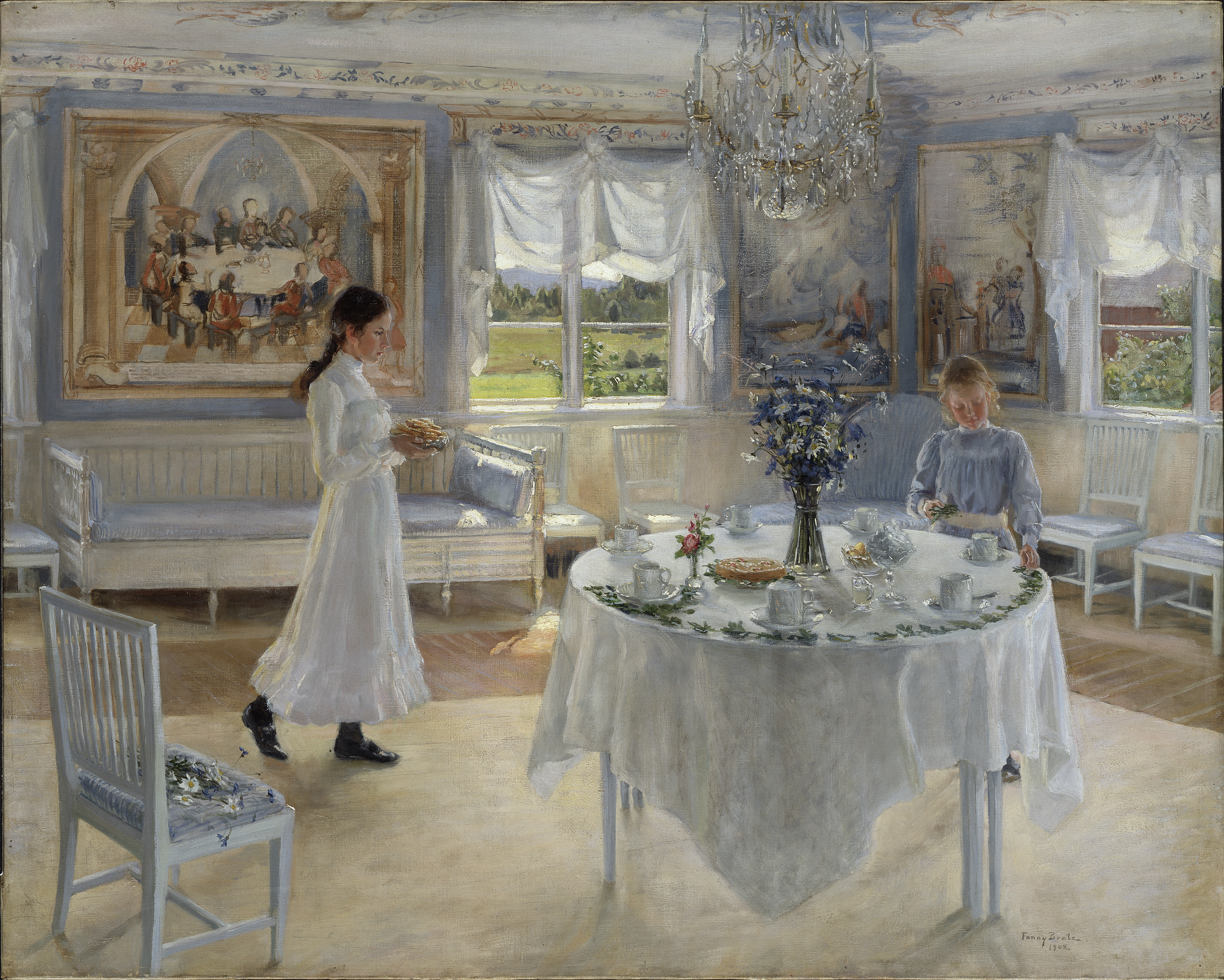
Fanny Brate's 1901 A Day of Celebration shows two girls decorating a table; the background is a painting of an undecorated medieval table surround by waiting diners.

Early dining tables were purely functional; the term "setting the table" originated in the middle ages to describe setting a board on two trestles to provide a temporary surface on which to set food. Diners supplied their own knife and spoon and food was often eaten off a slice of bread set directly on the table. A medieval table in a wealthy household might be covered in a cloth that was used as a common napkin rather than having a decorative purpose. According to Claudia Quigley Murphy, even among the wealthy a table would be set only with a salt cellar, cups, and sometimes stands for dishes that were being delivered to the table by cooks. When plates were introduced, they were often shared among two or more diners. By the late 1600s forks were in common use; this utensil meant fewer drips and greasy fingers to wipe, which made practical the use of decorative tablecloths and napkins.

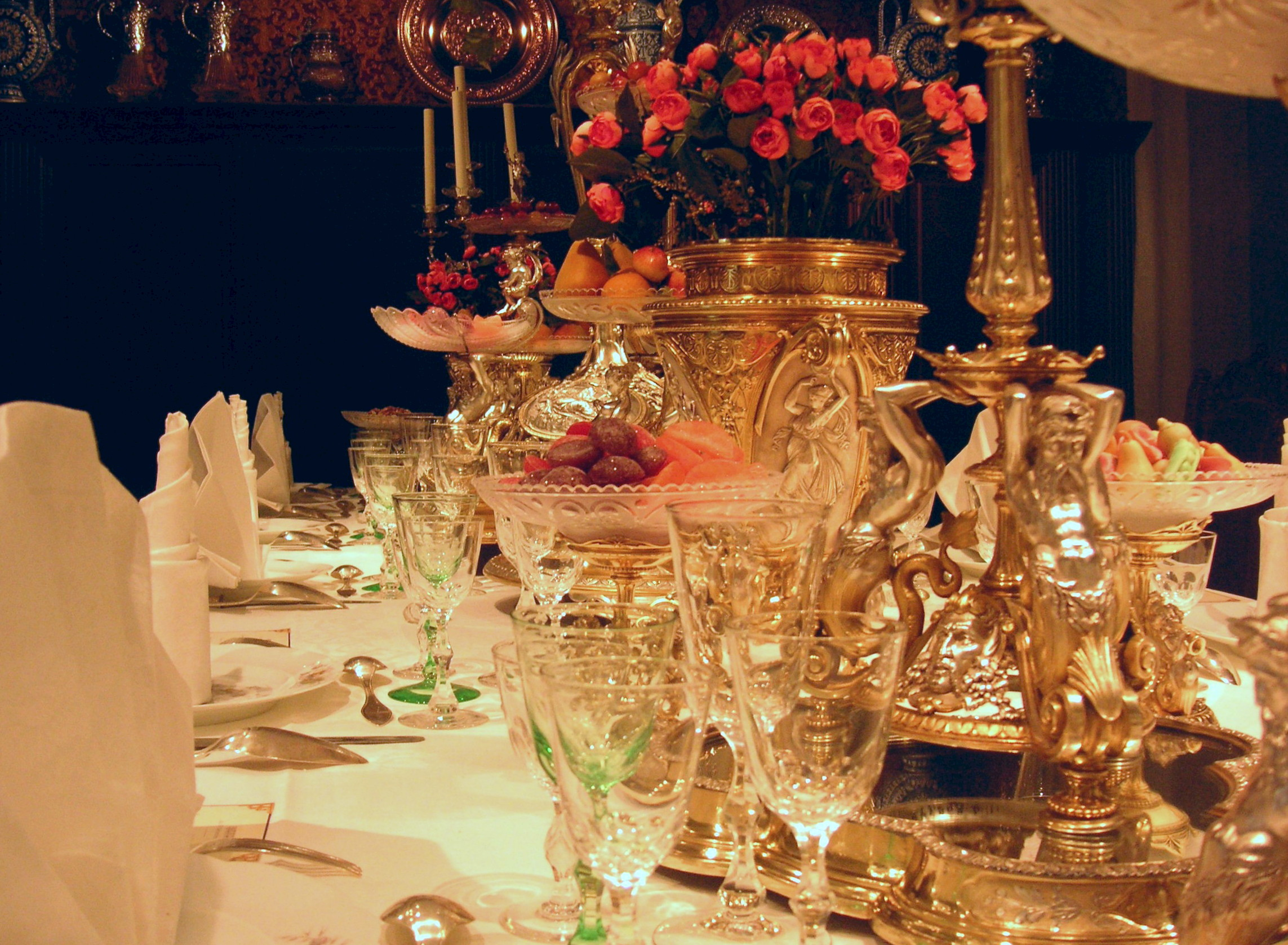
A lavish formal dining setting at the Nordic Museum shows off wealth with crystal glassware and silver tabletop items including a centerpiece with flowers.

Table-setting became a Western craze in the late 1700s, when the aristocracy used the practice as a self-expression form and to display wealth. Themed tablescapes have since then provided an "escape from daily life to a fantasy world". Flatware, dishes, glassware, and supplementary pieces kept being introduced with the trend peaking in the Victorian Era (1837–1901), with about twenty expensive items per setting "contributed to the table's shiny new look".

According to Slate, it was the shift from 1750 to 1900, and from service à la française—when courses were served en masse and diners served themselves buffet-style—to service à la russe, where courses followed one after the next and were portioned out by servants. The changeover meant that instead of a visual feast of the former method, there was a void as serving dishes were now on a side table leaving the dinner table more bare which led to "elaborate, sometimes absurd, table settings". Expensive centerpieces soon followed as a way to display one's wealth. In the mid 1700s "ornate silver baskets called epergnes, long mirrored trays called plateaus, flowers, and candelabras" were employed.

In the late 1800s middle class families in Europe and America emulated the wealthy but relied on fresh flowers as centerpieces. In the mid-1900s women's gardening clubs held display exhibitions to promote table decorating. By the late 1800s Isabella Beeton was advising the American middle class in her Mrs. Beeton's Book of Household Management that there was no excuse not to have flowers on the table every day.

== Tablescaping ==
Tablescaping is a portmanteau of table and landscaping. It was coined in the 1960s by the British designer David Hicks and popularized by television chef Sandra Lee in 2003.

The concept became better known with the rise in social media posts centered on images of meals people share including the setting; on photo-sharing Instagram, as of November 2019, #tabledecor had 1.9 million posts, and #tablesetting had 2.3 million posts. A countertrend is for a rustic or minimal theme, with a sustainability aesthetic emphasizing materials and components that are recycled and upcycled.

Tablescaping also refers to a category of general room decor which includes intentional design for horizontal surfaces such as consoles, coffee tables, mantles, bookshelves, dressers, or other surfaces and which is more or less a permanent installment, typically changing only seasonally or when the room decor changes.

== Formal exhibitions and competition ==
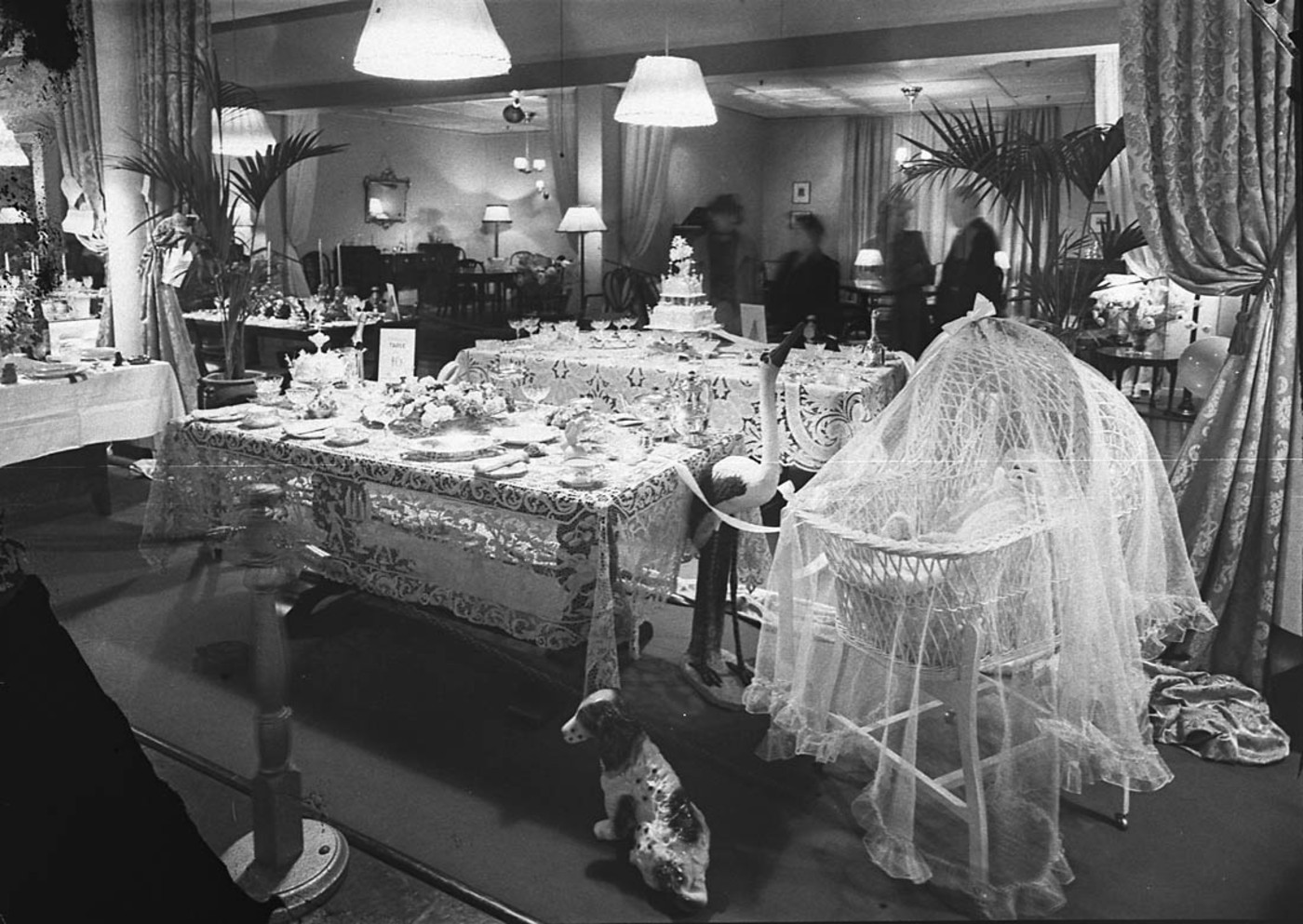
Baby-shower themed tablesetting at a Sydney exhibition in 1941

In the United States, competitions take place at county fairs, and events across the country; competitive table-setting traces back to at least the 1930s. The creations are "rigorously judged" with points lost for items of glassware, cutlery, or plates missing or out of place, fingerprints on cutlery or glassware, or other flaws. Points can be gained for creativity or interpretation of a theme. Other criteria considered can include aesthetics, functionality, balance, and the corresponding fictional menu that would accompany the table's meal; an entry can use a formal table setting, or be quite casual depending on the theme. In Australia formal exhibitions date to at least the 1940s.

=== Documentary ===
A 2021 documentary film about competitive tablesetting, Set!, was filmed primarily at the Orange County Fair by filmmakers Scott Gawlik and Jon Salmon. It won the jury award at the Newport Beach Film Festival. The film follows several competitors as they prepare for the year's competition, beginning with competition for entry slots, as there are only twenty each year. The competition designates several themes contestants can choose. Each entry is judged on a 100-point scale, with 25 points each for suitability for occasion & theme; decorativeness & eye-appeal; creativity & originality; and correctness & menu.

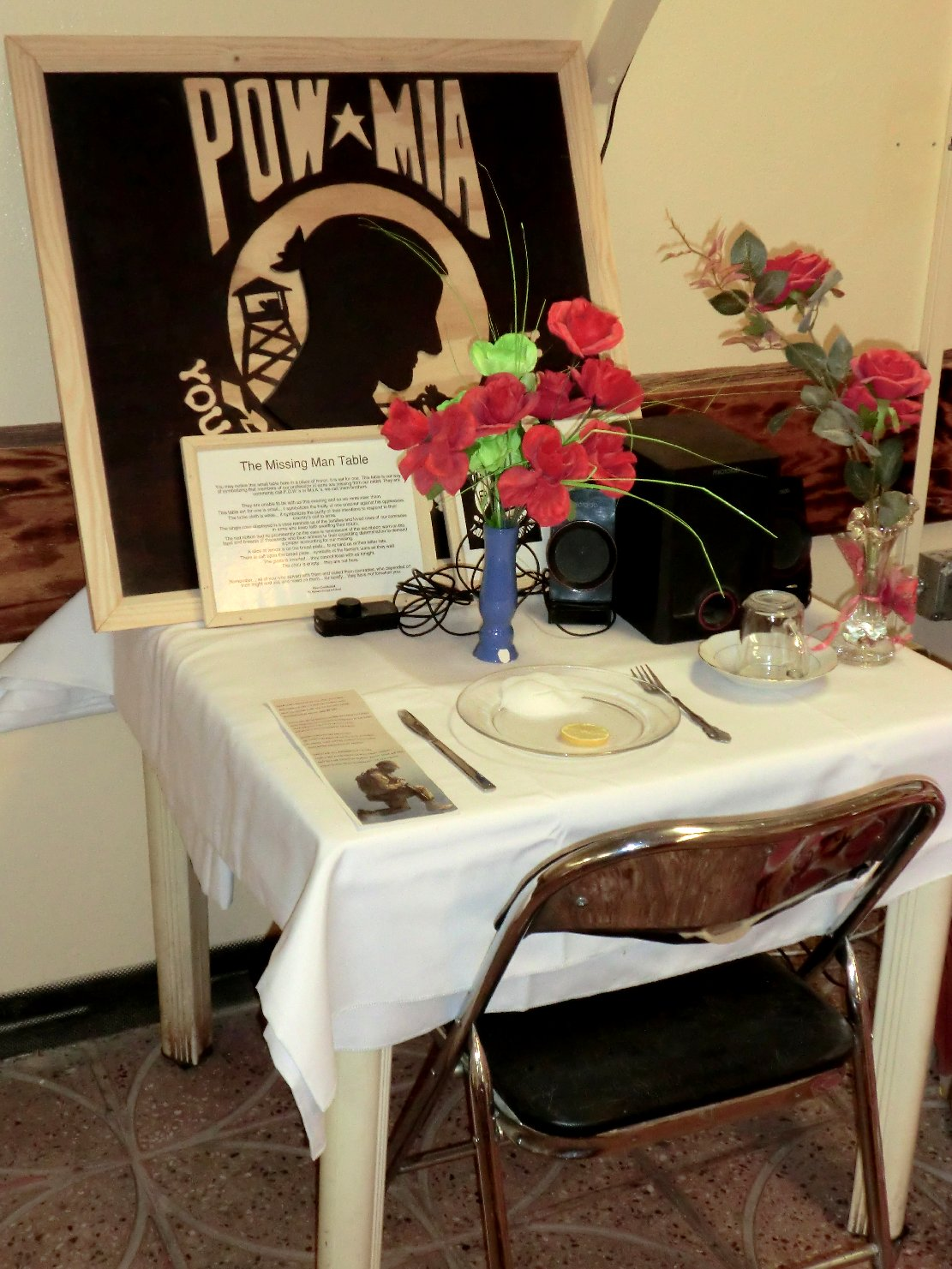
A "Missing Man" setting at a military dining event at Camp Spann in Afghanistan (25 November 2011) is set as a reminder that troops are still missing in action (MIA), and prisoners of war (PWA).
