= The Deepening =

- Bob's Burgers episode
- In a shot parodying Jaws, Teddy slips towards the mechanical shark's mouth.
- Episode no.: Season 3 Episode 6
- Directed by: Bernard Derriman
- Written by: Greg Thompson
- Production code: 2ASA11
- Original air date: November 25, 2012

Guest appearances
- Kevin Kline as Mr. Fischoeder; Pamela Adlon as Kristi; David Herman as Dude; Jay Johnston as Jimmy Pesto; Andy Kindler as Mort; Larry Murphy as Teddy; Sam Seder as Hugo

Episode chronology
← Previous "An Indecent Thanksgiving Proposal"	Next → "Tina-Rannosaurus Wrecks"
- Bob's Burgers season 3

"The Deepening" is the sixth episode of the third season of the animated comedy series Bob's Burgers and the overall 28th episode, and is written by Greg Thompson and directed by Bernard Derriman. It aired on Fox in the United States on November 25, 2012.

== Plot ==
Mr. Fischoeder, who needs a new attraction at Wonder Wharf, arrives at Bob's Burgers to seek guidance from the Belchers. Bob remembers that the town served as the filming location of a shark-themed '80s B movie, The Deepening. The family discovers that the original prop shark from the movie is up for sale and convinces Fischoeder to buy it. However, Teddy ominously objects.

At the unveiling of the shark, the Belchers find out Fischoeder has filled it with diesel. The shark, which is now able to move, nearly causes an accident by ripping off a woman's prosthetic arm. Early the next morning, the Belcher kids sneak off to Wonder Wharf to steal the shark's fin for "mechanical shark fin soup." Gene mounts the shark with a knife to cut off its fin, but he accidentally knocks the shark off its perch: the kids leave, and Louise tells her siblings to act like they were "never there."

That same morning, Bob notices people panicking outside and goes to investigate. He arrives at Wonder Wharf to find the mechanical shark flopping around on the ground. Fischoeder reveals there is no way to stop the shark until it runs out of gas; furthermore, he is reluctant to stop it, as it is now drawing larger crowds than ever. Bob worries the shark will leave the wharf and pleads with Fischoeder, but it is already too late: the shark smashes through the gates of Wonder Wharf and runs amok in traffic.

Bob, as "Block Captain," rallies the local business owners to figure out what to do about the shark. Tina, who empathized with the shark after watching The Deepening, tries to dissuade the townspeople from stopping its progress. After she impulsively confesses that she and the kids knocked over the shark, the townspeople begin to turn on the Belchers. But Teddy encourages the townspeople to work together, and they begin brainstorming how to stop the shark, which is now heading towards Bob's restaurant.

Each of the townspeople's ideas goes horribly wrong and only serves to make the shark more dangerous: a spike strip becomes attached to the shark, an oil slick intended to "slow its momentum" ends up making it faster, and after it hits a telephone pole, it becomes electrified. Finally, the shark falls into a hole in the ground that the townspeople dug to catch it. This seems to work until subterranean noises indicate the shark has eaten its way into Bob’s basement.

Bob, Teddy, and Mort enter the restaurant to try and stop the shark. Teddy reveals the reason for his hatred of the shark: he acted as a lifeguard in The Deepening. While talking to a girl on set, the prop operator startled him with the shark, causing him to spill his drink on the girl and embarrass himself. Bob asks Teddy why he resents the shark instead of the operator; Teddy stops to consider this logic briefly before deciding he still hates the shark.

The shark emerges from the ground, knocking Mort into the basement. Teddy falls into the shark's mouth, though his "boydle" prevents him from being crushed by its teeth. Tina gets the idea to fill the shark with ice cream from their soft serve machine, which has fallen inside the shark’s body. Bob is able to plug in the machine, and the shark, now filled with ice cream, finally ends its rampage. On a news report, Hugo, the health inspector and "Quadrant Captain," takes credit for stopping the shark.

== Reception ==
Rowan Kaiser of The A.V. Club gave the episode a B+, saying "This sweet, hilarious confusion helps Bob's Burgers to operate at the two levels it requires during the course of the episode. The character work keeps it grounded as an episode of Bob's Burgers. Meanwhile, the monster-movie parody works in large part because, as everyone plays it straight, there's Tina in the corner, defending a mechanical shark on the grounds that it was used in a movie to depict a confused shark. Bob tries to tell her that she's wrong by comparing it to a toaster, but Tina's empathy knows no bounds: 'Our toaster is also confused. It doesn't know why we put bagels in it.'"

Ross Bonaime of Paste gave the episode 8.3 out of 10, saying "The Deepening" is one of the more fulfilling episodes of Bob's Burgers' third season, making the family one singular unit against the shark (even though Tina's allegiances are split), and having the family forced against the town is a familiar scenario, but it still works well. "The Deepening" has one focused storyline instead of splitting the family into several that don't feel fully fleshed out, and that makes for one of the funniest episodes so far this year." The episode received a 2.0 rating and was watched by a total of 4.66 million people. This made it the fourth most watched show on Animation Domination that night, beating The Cleveland Show but losing to The Simpsons with 7.46 million.
