= Broadcast Wagstaff School News =

- Bob's Burgers episode
- Episode no.: Season 3 Episode 12
- Directed by: Jennifer Coyle
- Written by: Greg Thompson
- Production code: 2ASA21
- Original air date: January 27, 2013

Guest appearances
- Will Forte as Mr. Grant; Melissa Galsky as Miss Jacobson; David Herman as Mr. Frond; Larry Murphy as Teddy; Laura Silverman as Andy; Sarah Silverman as Ollie; Jenny Slate as Tammy; Bobby Tisdale as Zeke

Episode chronology
← Previous "Nude Beach"	Next → "My Fuzzy Valentine"
- Bob's Burgers season 3

"Broadcast Wagstaff School News" is the 12th episode of the third season of the animated comedy series Bob's Burgers and the overall 34th episode, and is written by Greg Thompson and directed by Jennifer Coyle. It aired on Fox in the United States on January 27, 2013.

== Plot ==
Tina decides to audition as an on-air news anchor for the Wagstaff School News, a school news program taught by Mr. Grant, the video communications teacher. Also auditioning is Tammy, Tina's short lived, "bad girl" friend who first appeared in "Bad Tina". In an effort to sabotage Tina's audition, Tammy tells Tina she speaks too fast and advises her to talk slower during the audition. Tina naively takes Tammy's advice and speaks excessively slowly, ruining her audition. Mr. Grant chooses Tammy as the news anchor, while Tina is chosen as the off-camera Staff Intern. Andy and Ollie Pesto are chosen as the field reporters, and Zeke is cast as the sports broadcaster.

Tina soon grows disillusioned with her job as an intern, as all she does is get juice boxes for the other kids. She’s also disheartened that the Wagstaff School News focuses on fluff stories and school gossip instead of hard-hitting news stories. When Wagstaff students fall victim to a series of defecations committed by a "serial pooper" (whom Tina classifies as the "Mad Pooper," but Linda calls "The Butt-ler"), she tries to convince Mr. Grant and Tammy to cover the story. Both decline, thinking that a story about poop is gross.

With Louise's help, Tina decides to film her own newscast called Tina News to cover the more serious crimes of the Mad Pooper. Subsequently, Tina News begins drawing more viewers than the Wagstaff School News, angering Mr. Grant and Tammy.

In an effort to draw viewers away from Tina News, Mr. Grant and Tammy decide to cover the crimes of The Mad Pooper. After airing a dramatic reenactment with Tammy dressed up as Tina taking a "#2 in the library," the students (and apparently the teachers and principal) come to believe that the Mad Pooper is Tina. After the segment airs, Tina is sent to the principal's office, where she encounters Louise, who is there for an "unrelated crime". Tina is anxious to attend an anti-smoking assembly in the gymnasium as she believes the Mad Pooper will strike there. Tina then enlists Louise to help her escape. Louise distracts the school secretary while Tina makes a run for it and confronts the Mad Pooper, who is revealed to be none other than Zeke. He claims he was responsible for being the Mad Pooper and that he only continued his poop spree to garner more views for Tina News. Zeke then decides to strike once more and poops from the rafters of the stage. Louise, who has also made her way to the assembly, pushes Tammy in the path of Zeke's poop. In a subsequent segment of Wagstaff School News, Tammy hails Louise as a hero "for saving her hair", as she doesn't realize that Louise wasn't trying to move her out of harm's way. Tammy then states that Zeke "is not in trouble because his family moves around a lot." Mr. Grant, on behalf of WSN, apologizes to Tina for leading the school to believe she was the Mad Pooper and presents a new WSN special, the Tina Table, hosted by Tina.

Meanwhile, Gene becomes convinced that he will grow up to look just like Bob after seeing a photo of Bob when he was Gene's age. Louise encourages this by telling Gene that he is losing his hair. Gene then decides to embrace what he believes is his destiny. With Louise's help, he begins styling his hair like Bob's (complete with a bald spot and "sad" arm hair) and impersonating him. While everyone who encounters Gene agrees that he looks and sounds just like Bob, Bob disagrees and becomes increasingly annoyed. Over the next few days, Gene continues to copy Bob, much to Linda's delight and Bob's irritation. Gene finally goes back to his original look and personality after he realizes he's still a kid and wants to see The Mad Pooper strike again at the anti-smoking assembly. While Bob is relieved, Linda is disappointed that Gene will no longer be her "Muppet Baby Bobby".

== Reception ==
Rowan Kaiser of The A.V. Club gave the episode an A−, saying "Here's the thing: Tina's plot hinges on Louise being smart about everything and equally willing to cause trouble. She can't record her investigations without a camera—which is uncovered by Louise. She can't get airtime without Louise's semi-accidental skill at blackmail. And she can't get away from the principal's office without Louise getting in trouble to get there then springing Tina with expert manipulation. Louise's presence can smooth over any aspect of Bob's Burgers. It ain't a secret weapon, but it's a damn effective one." The episode received a 2.0 rating and was watched by a total of 4.12 million people. This made it the fourth most watched show on Animation Domination that night, beating The Cleveland Show but losing to Family Guy with 5.63 million.

== See also ==
- List of Bob's Burgers episodes
