= Nude Beach (Bob's Burgers) =

- Bob's Burgers episode
- Episode no.: Season 3 Episode 11
- Directed by: Wes Archer
- Written by: Scott Jacobson
- Production code: 2ASA20
- Original air date: January 13, 2013

Guest appearances
- Aziz Ansari as Darryl; Fred Armisen as Tommy; David Herman as Referee; Andy Kindler as Mort; Ron Lynch as Ron; Larry Murphy as Teddy; Andre Royo as himself; Sam Seder as Hugo; Bobby Tisdale as Zeke

Episode chronology
← Previous "Mother Daughter Laser Razor"	Next → "Broadcast Wagstaff School News"
- Bob's Burgers season 3

"Nude Beach" is the 11th episode of the third season of the animated comedy series Bob's Burgers and the overall 33rd episode, and is written by Scott Jacobson and directed by Wes Archer. It aired on Fox in the United States on January 13, 2013.

== Plot ==
While inspecting Bob's Burgers, Hugo the health inspector discovers Bob has not had adequate hand-washing training and posts a humiliating sign, "The Cook Has Dirty Stinky Hands," on the restaurant window before leaving to inspect a nude beach. The next day, Linda and her friend Gretchen arrive at the nude beach to find out that Hugo has quit his job as a health inspector and joined the nudists.

Meanwhile, the kids discover the existence of the nude beach, which is off-limits to people under 18, and sell admission to a secret spot overlooking the beach. Teenage boys come in droves, but after realizing the nudists are mostly old and unattractive, they are repulsed. Louise reignites their interest by claiming she is selling "real nudity," and their business booms.

Hugo's replacement, Tommy Jaronda, arrives, removes the sign, and hits it off with Bob instantly. He reveals himself to be a rock musician and requests Bob attend his show later that night. Bob plans to go, but Tommy Jaronda returns, claiming to be banned from the venue. He asks Bob if he can play at the restaurant, and Bob impulsively books him for the entire week, hoping to win him over. However, Tommy Jaronda's graphic, misogynistic, and risqué songs alienate and deter customers, even Mort, from the restaurant. At first, Bob cannot muster up the courage to tell Tommy Jaronda to stop playing, hoping not to get on his bad side. Bob tries to remind Tommy Jaronda that his restaurant is a family restaurant and that his songs are risqué and deterring customers, but Tommy Jaronda wipes Bob's records clean before he can finish.

When Bob has finally had enough of Tommy Jaronda, he tells him to play somewhere else. In response, Tommy Jaronda plants rat feces in the restaurant and shuts it down. Bob reluctantly goes to the nude beach to ask for Hugo’s help, but Hugo is reluctant to leave behind the nudist life; he agrees to return to the trade if Bob can beat him in a 27-event "Nudecathlon." If Bob wins, Hugo will return to his job as the health inspector and reopen Bob's Burgers, but if Hugo wins, Bob must cater the Nudecathlon closing ceremony for free. After discovering the commitment required, Bob tries to back out, but Linda convinces him to compete against Hugo.

The "Nudecathlon" draws massive crowds of kids to the secret cliff spot to watch Bob compete against Hugo. Hugo narrowly beats Bob (Bob 13 points and Hugo 14), and Bob returns in distress, expecting to lose the restaurant to Tommy Jaronda. However, a fully clothed Hugo enters the restaurant, saying that he wants to be the one to someday close down the restaurant; until he does, Bob's Burgers will stay open. As Bob lost to Hugo, he still must cater the closing ceremony, and Hugo invites in his nudist friends, who promptly disrobe in the restaurant. Meanwhile, Tommy Jaronda is shown playing at Jimmy Pesto's Pizzeria.

== Reception ==
Rowan Kaiser of The A.V. Club gave the episode a B, saying "All this is not to say that "Nude Beach" was a bad episode, though it might have been slightly below the increasingly high average that Bob's Burgers has set for itself. But it's the sort of episode that demonstrates that the show has a core backbone that it can rely on for steady episodes generally, and perhaps even better than in the cases where the balance works." The episode received a 2.3 rating and was watched by a total of 4.44 million people. This made it the fourth most watched show on Animation Domination that night, beating The Cleveland Show but losing to Family Guy with 6.01 million.
