= Anthony Chun =

Animation director

- Occupation: Animation director
- Known for: Directing episodes of Rick and Morty, Doctor Strange in the Multiverse of Madness
- Awards: Primetime Emmy Award for Outstanding Animated Program (2018)

Anthony Chun is an animation director. His credits span Rick and Morty, Doctor Strange in the Multiverse of Madness, and The Batman.

Chun worked on adult comedy, children's shows, and action. He has been recognized twice by the Television Academy for his work in animated television. In 2013, Chun was nominated for the Primetime Emmy Award for Outstanding Animated Program for directing the Bob's Burgers episode O.T.: The Outside Toilet. Five years later, he won the same award in 2018 for directing the Rick and Morty episode "Pickle Rick".

Chun and his family lost their home to the 2025 Los Angeles wildfires.

== Selected filmography ==
Year	Title	Work	Notes
2004–2007	The Batman	Art Department	11 episodes
2007–2008	King of the Hill	Director	4 episodes
2011–2013	Bob's Burgers	Director	9 episodes
2017–2019	Rick and Morty	Director	4 episodes
2020	Solar Opposites	Director, producer	TV series
2022	Doctor Strange in the Multiverse of Madness	Art Department	film
