= Sheesh! Cab, Bob? =

- Bob's Burgers episode
- Episode no.: Season 1 Episode 6
- Directed by: Jennifer Coyle
- Written by: Jon Schroeder
- Production code: 1ASA09
- Original air date: March 6, 2011

Guest appearances
- Kevin Kline as Mr. Fischoeder; Steve Agee as Glitter; David Herman as Marshmallow; Jay Johnston as Jimmy Pesto; Andy Kindler as Mort; Jack McBrayer as Marbles; Oscar Nunez as Cha-Cha

Episode chronology
← Previous "Hamburger Dinner Theater"	Next → "Bed & Breakfast"
- Bob's Burgers season 1

"Sheesh! Cab, Bob?" is the sixth episode of the first season of the American animated television series Bob's Burgers. It first aired on the Fox network in the United States on March 6, 2011. In the episode, Bob takes a second job as a nighttime cab driver so he can give Tina the 13th birthday party she wants. Meanwhile, Tina prepares for a kiss from Jimmy Pesto Jr., much to Bob's dismay.

The episode was written by Jon Schroeder and directed by Jennifer Coyle. According to Nielsen ratings, it was viewed in 4.91 million viewers in its original airing. The episode is considered a classic from the show's early seasons, and has been featured on many critics favorite episode lists. The episode featured guest performances by Kevin Kline, Steve Agee, Andy Kindler, David Herman, Jay Johnston, Jack McBrayer and Oscar Nunez.

== Plot ==
Tina's 13th birthday is coming up, and Linda suggests to Bob that they should make it extra-special. She wants the party to have a romantic moment with Jimmy Pesto Jr.. Bob believes they cannot afford what Tina wants, but Linda insists. Bob asks the restaurant's landlord Mr. Fischoeder for an extension on their rent. He refuses, instead offering Bob a job as a taxi cab driver so he can earn extra money.

Bob accepts the offer. On the first night of his job, Bob befriends three transvestite prostitutes: Glitter, Marbles, and Cha-Cha. Tina invites several classmates to her party, including Jimmy Jr., who needs permission from his father for the RSVP. Unfortunately, Jimmy forbids his son from attending; Tina refuses to have a party without Jimmy Jr. Bob tries to change his mind, and Jimmy Sr. says he will allow Jr. to attend only if Bob will shave his mustache so Jimmy can keep it as a trophy. Bob refuses, causing a rift between him and Tina.

After a night out with the prostitutes, Bob returns to the restaurant drunk. Linda tells Bob that Tina has agreed to attend the party, but only for a few minutes. Bob passes out in the restaurant kitchen, waking up half an hour into the party, and finds it is not going well: the boys and girls are not dancing, and Mort's magician act fails to impress. Several of Bob's taxi customers arrive, whom Bob had apparently invited while intoxicated, and subsequently forgot. Tina is mortified. Bob excuses himself to shave his mustache in order to give in to Jimmy Pesto's demand, and redeem himself to Tina. Glitter and Marbles tell Tina that Bob is a good father who worked two jobs to pay for her party. Upon Bob's return, Tina apologizes to Bob for her lack of gratitude, and says that he already made the party perfect, even without Jimmy Jr. present. However, the sentiment comes too late to save his mustache. Before he turns over his whiskers to Pesto, the sex workers tell Bob that they recognize Jimmy as "Baby Num Num", a "diaper lover." Bob then brings them over to Jimmy's restaurant and threatens to publicly expose him. Pesto concedes, and Jimmy Jr. attends the party. Tina and Jimmy Jr. kiss under the disco ball, and Gene plays the song "If You Were Here".

== Production ==
The episode was originally titled 'Bob After Dark', but was later changed, making it the 2nd episode of the show to have a working title be changed, the first episode being Sexy Dance Fighting, which was originally titled "Capoeira."

Being an early episode, Mr. Fishoeder's eye patch is incorrectly colored as black, it is unknown whether this is a coloring error or an early decision that was later changed. This would be strange, though, as Burger War, which aired later but was produced before this episode, has his eye patch colored the correct white color.

The song "Lifting Up the Skirt of the Night" was written and performed by John Roberts, with series creator Loren Bouchard singing backing vocals

The episode was made as the first seasons 9th episode in production order, but aired as the 6th episode in broadcasting order on Fox.

== Reception ==
In its original American broadcasting, "Sheesh! Cab, Bob?" was viewed by an estimated 4.91 million viewers and received a 2.7 rating/4% share among adults between the ages of 18 and 49, an improvement from last episode and became the highest rated episode of the season to be aired after the first two episodes.

Rowan Kaiser of The A.V. Club gave the episode an A−, saying "As funny as the episode is, it's also genuinely sweet by the end, with Bob and Tina bonding over how much work he's done. Of course, that just makes his drunken bender with sex workers that much funnier, as well as Louise acting as Tina's kissing coordinator and sending her to boot camp."

Lillian Brown of Vulture called the episode one of the 20 essential Bob's Burgers episodes in 2022.
