= Bob's Burgers season 1 =

Bob's Burgers
- Season 1
- DVD cover
- No. of episodes: 13

Release
- Original network: Fox
- Original release: January 9 – May 22, 2011

Season chronology
- Next → Season 2

The first season of the American animated sitcom Bob's Burgers began airing on Fox in the United States on January 9, 2011, and concluded on May 22, 2011. Thirteen episodes long, the season was produced by Bento Box Entertainment in association with 20th Century Fox Television. The series follows the family—father Bob, mother Linda, daughters Louise and Tina Belcher, and son Gene. The show features the voices of H. Jon Benjamin, Dan Mintz, Eugene Mirman, John Roberts and Kristen Schaal in their roles of the Belcher family. This is the only season that was animated using Adobe Flash.

The series premiere, "Human Flesh", was broadcast directly after The Simpsons at 8:00 p.m., and was watched by 9.41 million viewers, making it the highest-rated new series premiere of the season. The season received mixed reviews from television commentators, particularly "Torpedo", "Spaghetti Western and Meatballs" and "Art Crawl", however some critics disliked the themes of the episodes. The Volume One DVD box set, including all 13 episodes and the initial pilot developed for 2010 airing, was released in Region 1 on April 17, 2012. It has not been released in other regions. Loren Bouchard conceived the idea for Bob's Burgers after developing Home Movies for UPN.

== Episodes ==
No. overall	No. in season	Title	Directed by	Written by	Original release date	Prod. code	U.S. viewers (millions)
1	1	"Human Flesh"	Anthony Chun	Loren Bouchard & Jim Dauterive	January 9, 2011	1ASA01	9.38
When Louise spreads a rumor at her school that human flesh is used for Bob's hamburgers, health inspector Hugo visits the restaurant and inspects it.
2	2	"Crawl Space"	Kyounghee Lim	Loren Bouchard & Jim Dauterive	January 16, 2011	1ASA02	5.07
Bob pretends to be trapped in a crawl space in the wall while Linda's parents visit, but rescue efforts cease when he reveals the ruse after getting trapped for real.
3	3	"Sacred Cow"	Jennifer Coyle	Nora Smith	January 23, 2011	1ASA04	4.81
Bob tries to get a documentary filmmaker to remove the cow he stations outside the restaurant to protest meat eating, but takes to the cow when he takes matters into his own hands.
4	4	"Sexy Dance Fighting"	Anthony Chun	Steven Davis & Kelvin Yu	February 13, 2011	1ASA06	4.19
Bob has to cover for Tina when she takes a capoeira class.
5	5	"Hamburger Dinner Theater"	Wes Archer	Dan Fybel & Rich Rinaldi	February 20, 2011	1ASA05	4.87
Linda and the kids stage a murder mystery that gets a little real when the restaurant is robbed.
6	6	"Sheesh! Cab, Bob?"	Jennifer Coyle	Jon Schroeder	March 6, 2011	1ASA09	4.91
Bob becomes a cab driver to make the extra cash to pay for Tina's 13th birthday.
7	7	"Bed & Breakfast"	Boohwan Lim	Holly Schlesinger	March 13, 2011	1ASA08	4.10
Linda's guests don't want to participate in her bed and breakfast, so Linda invites Teddy to stay as her "perfect guest". But Louise swears revenge on him when he displaces her from her room.
8	8	"Art Crawl"	Kyounghee Lim	Lizzie Molyneux & Wendy Molyneux	March 20, 2011	1ASA07	4.43
It's Bob vs. the city art council when Linda's sister displays her work at Bob's Burgers.
9	9	"Spaghetti Western and Meatballs"	Wes Archer	Kit Boss	March 27, 2011	1ASA10	4.65
Bob and Gene bond over classic Western movies, making Louise feel left out.
10	10	"Burger War"	Boohwan Lim	Loren Bouchard	April 10, 2011	1ASA03	4.00
Bob has to drum up business before his rival, Jimmy Pesto, can take over the restaurant's lease.
11	11	"Weekend at Mort's"	Anthony Chun	Scott Jacobson	May 8, 2011	1ASA11	4.26
Mold drives the Belchers to Mort's mortuary for the weekend. Louise tries to frighten Gene and babysitter Tina while Bob and Linda go out on a double date with Mort and an online mortician acquaintance.
12	12	"Lobsterfest"	Boohwan Lim	Aron Abrams & Greg Thompson	May 15, 2011	1ASA13	4.68
Bob feeds the town during a storm that shuts down Lobsterfest. But when the storm passes and festivities resume, Bob, resentful of the annual event, protests it and ends up tainting the town's butter supply and incurring the town's wrath.
13	13	"Torpedo"	Kyounghee Lim	Dan Fybel & Rich Rinaldi	May 22, 2011	1ASA12	4.31
Bob is thrilled when his baseball hero Torpedo Jones takes a liking to his burgers, but has misgivings when he realizes that Torpedo is just using the burger grease to cheat, especially when it causes Gene to cheat in a mascot race.
