= Weekend at Mort's =

- Bob's Burgers episode
- Episode no.: Season 1 Episode 11
- Directed by: Anthony Chun
- Written by: Scott Jacobson
- Production code: 1ASA011
- Original air date: May 8, 2011

Guest appearances
- Jay Johnston as Jimmy Pesto; Andy Kindler as Mort; Amy Sedaris as Samantha; Sam Seder as Hugo

Episode chronology
← Previous "Burger Wars"	Next → "Lobsterfest"
- Bob's Burgers season 1

"Weekend at Mort's" is the 11th episode of the first season of the animated television series Bob's Burgers. The episode originally aired on the Fox network in the United States on May 8, 2011. In this episode, Bob's restaurant gets a case of green mold and the family is forced to live in their neighbor Mort's crematorium for the time being, giving Bob & Linda the hellish honeymoon they never got.

The episode was written by Scott Jacobson and directed by Anthony Chun. According to Nielsen ratings, it was viewed by 4.26 million viewers in its original airing. The episode featured guest performances by Jay Johnston, Andy Kindler, Amy Sedaris and Sam Seder.

== Plot ==
The kids discover mold in the restaurant, so Bob calls Hugo, the health inspector, to get rid of it. Hugo needs to shut down the restaurant while it is fumigated over the weekend (claiming that bleach cannot get rid of mold). Bob plans to go to a hotel, but Mort offers for them to stay at his crematory home, which the family agrees to.

They arrive at the funeral home and discover that it is not what they expected - it is an expensive, modern apartment. Mort explains that he gets his furniture pieces at a discount because people have died on them. Bob and Linda decide that for their first weekend away from work in years, they can have their second honeymoon while Mort watches the kids. Bob plans to spend the weekend creating a model replica of the bus from Speed, but Linda wants their stay to be romantic. Meanwhile, Mort is having fun with the kids and lets them explore the morgue. Louise goes on Mort's computer and finds that he received a message from someone on a dating website for morticians and, pretending to be Mort, invites her to a date at Jimmy Pesto's. When she agrees to come, Linda forces Bob to come with her as a double date, leaving Tina in charge, despite her past failures at babysitting.

Bob, Linda, Mort and Samantha, Mort's date, arrive at Jimmy Pesto's Pastafarian night (Jamaican-styled cuisine). Mort and Samantha get along excellently, but Bob is left out and gets heavily drunk. While babysitting, Tina is convinced by Louise and Gene to let them explore the morgue unsupervised. Going deeper into the morgue, Louise pulls a prank on the others and makes them believe there is a zombie hiding in the morgue. At Jimmy Pesto's, Bob abandons Linda and goes back to Mort's apartment. Hearing the kids in the morgue, he goes downstairs to investigate, but drunkenly falls asleep in an empty coffin. Louise continues scaring the others, but they hear Bob's snoring and believe it's a real zombie. The kids duct-tape the coffin shut and push it into the crematorium. Before the coffin gets burnt, the kids realize that Bob is inside as he frees himself. Mort and Samantha come back to the morgue to make out, but Bob realizes that facing death has made him appreciate his relationship with Linda, so he goes back to Jimmy Pesto's to dance with her. After arriving, Bob notices mold in Jimmy Pesto's restaurant; Hugo tells Pesto that he can remove it with bleach.

== Production ==
The title of this episode refers to the 1989 dark comedy Weekend at Bernie's, which follows a similar theme of death.

In audio commentary for the episode, it is revealed the character of Mort and the basis of this episode is based on Scott Jacobson's brother, who is a mortician. Scott also reveals that the corpse cream in the episode is based on an actual bottle of corpse cream he found in his brother's basement. It is also revealed that for the bus from Speed model Bob builds, the crew bought an actual model kit and modeled the box seen in the episode after it to be more realistic.

Jacobson mentions that during the production of this episode, he called his brother to ask him a joke question about morticians, but after a long awkward pause his brother revealed their grandmother had died.

== Reception ==
In its original American broadcasting, "Weekend at Mort's" was viewed by an estimated 4.26 million viewers and received a 2.0 rating/6% share among adults between the ages of 18 and 49, an increase from last episode.

Rowan Kaiser of The A.V. Club gave the episode a B+, saying "Thanks to an invasion of green mold, the family shuts down the restaurant and hangs out at Mort's Mortuary apartments for a few days. Linda decides that this means it's time for the honeymoon they never had. Bob decides it's time to build the model of the bus from Speed he's been waiting to do since, well, Speed. The kids decide to go crazy, as they do. And Mort, being a gracious host, decides (initially) that he wants to take care of the kids. Which is a great plan, until it means that Louise sets him up on a hot mortician's date and gets all the adults out of the building to explore the morgue. Hilarity most definitely ensues. It's not deep, and it's not quite as delirious as "Art Crawl", but gags like Jimmy Pesto's Jamaican night are consistent winners. I think episodes like this are Bob's Burgers' baseline moving forward – weird, funny, and occasional springboards to episodes of sheer genius."

Brendan K. O'Grady of Vulture was a bit more critical, calling "Weekend at Mort's" a "comfortably average episode of a certainly above-average show, one that disappoints only due to its timing and perhaps the heightened expectations that Bob's Burgers' growing fanbase (myself included/especially) are bringing to every new installment."
