= Lobsterfest =

- Bob's Burgers episode
- Episode no.: Season 1 Episode 12
- Directed by: Boohwan Lim
- Written by: Aron Abrams; Greg Thompson
- Production code: 1ASA13
- Original air date: May 15, 2011

Guest appearances
- David Herman as Mr. Frond; Andy Kindler as Mort; Ron Lynch as Ron; Jerry Minor as Officer Julia; Larry Murphy as Teddy; Sam Seder as Hugo

Episode chronology
← Previous "Weekend at Mort's"	Next → "Torpedo"
- Bob's Burgers season 1

"Lobsterfest" is the 12th episode of the first season of the animated television series Bob's Burgers. The episode originally aired on the Fox network in the United States on May 15, 2011.

The episode was written by Aron Abrams & Greg Thompson and directed by Boohwan Lim. According to Nielsen ratings, it was viewed in 4.66 million viewers in its original airing. The episode featured guest performances by David Herman, Andy Kindler, Ron Lynch, Jerry Minor, Larry Murphy and Sam Seder.

== Plot ==
The town's Lobsterfest has arrived, much to the irritation of Bob, as it threatens to draw business from the restaurant. He also has an allergy to lobster. Hugo and Ron stop by and force Bob to hang a Lobsterfest poster, but he tears it down when they leave.

In school, Mr. Frond alerts Louise's class that a tropical storm which is going to hit town has now progressed to a hurricane. Due to the hurricane, Lobsterfest is cancelled, making Bob ecstatic. He decides to open Bob's Burgers for customers who were planning on going to Lobsterfest. Linda is worried about the restaurant and if a hurricane will destroy the business. However, more customers are coming in from the hurricane, including the Lobsterfest maidens and the health inspectors. Hugo meets one of the Lobsterfest maidens, Gretchen. Bob encourages Hugo to get closer to Gretchen by showing him his badge and thermometer. Bob decides to give burgers to people for free and names his party, "Bobsterfest". Meanwhile, the kids are in the basement for safety. Louise suggests looting the empty town while Tina compiles her "mating list," for when the town is destroyed and they must repopulate the earth. After sneaking outside, the kids find a lobster and decide to eat it to spite their father.

Bob deals with a huge hangover the next morning and discovers the restaurant is trashed from the party. Louise tries to boil the lobster, but Tina and Gene stop her, because they want their first time eating lobster to be special. Gene wants to have his in a hot tub after his first music show, Tina wants to eat her first one when she marries Jimmy Pesto Jr. and Louise wants to eat her first one as a way to escape prison. Louise accidentally drops the lobster into boiling water, and the kids decide to eat it anyway. Bob finds out that Lobsterfest is now open and attempts to bring sympathetic people back to the restaurant to help clean up, but they all refuse. Louise, Tina and Gene taste their first lobster, but Gene has an allergic reaction like Bob, which turns into anaphylactic shock. Bob goes on the Lobsterfest's stage and threatens to put his feet in a tub of melted butter. Linda convinces him not to, but Bob accidentally gets shot by Officers Julia and Cliffany and falls into the butter, contaminating it. Bob is accused of ruining Lobsterfest and will be thrown on a pile of the shells of spiky lobsters. Ron thinks it is unfair that Hugo is not stopping the crowd since Bob was his wingman. Hugo inspects the butter and announces it's still healthy to eat.

After the Lobsterfest, Gene lies to Bob, saying that he looks exactly the same as when he was born. Gretchen breaks up with Hugo, citing that although she did not mind he had a small badge, she could not deal with the fact that he does not know how to use it. Hugo retaliates by springing a surprise inspection on the trashed restaurant.

== Reception ==
In its original American broadcasting, "Lobsterfest" was viewed by an estimated 4.66 million viewers and received a 2.2 rating/6 percent share among adults between the ages of 18 and 49, an increase from last episode. Rowan Kaiser of The A.V. Club gave the episode a B, saying "I don't necessarily want to say that this is an entirely Hugo-based episode – it's not – but Hugo represents a joke character being turned into a more interesting real character. This is the kind of world-building that comedy series like the early Simpsons succeeded at. I like seeing these initially simple characters turn into parts of the Bob's Burgers world. It's doing what it needs to do to be a good series in the future, and it's certainly a good series now."
