= Bed & Breakfast (Bob's Burgers) =

- Bob's Burgers episode
- Episode no.: Season 1 Episode 7
- Directed by: Boohwan Lim
- Written by: Holly Schlesinger
- Production code: 1ASA08
- Original air date: March 13, 2011

Guest appearances
- Melissa Bardin Galsky as Nora Samuels; Andy Kindler as Mort; Larry Murphy as Teddy and Javed Fazel

Episode chronology
← Previous "Sheesh! Cab, Bob?"	Next → "Art Crawl"
- Bob's Burgers season 1

"Bed & Breakfast" is the seventh episode of the first season of the animated television series Bob's Burgers. The episode originally aired on the Fox network in the United States on March 13, 2011.

The episode was written by Holly Schlesinger and directed by Boohwan Lim. According to Nielsen ratings, it was viewed by 4.10 million viewers in its original airing. The episode featured guest performances by Melissa Bardin Galsky and Larry Murphy.

== Plot ==
Linda arrives back at the restaurant after shopping for materials for a bed and breakfast she is going to operate out of the Belchers' apartment. Bob disagrees with this business venture, not only because his children have to move into his room so that the customers can sleep in their rooms, but also because Linda puts in all of her efforts to entertain guests, and if Linda feels her efforts are not appreciated enough, she snaps. Linda becomes angry and she denies Bob's claims, saying she is a very good hostess. Tina and Gene have to move into their parents' room, so that the guests can sleep in the children's rooms. An Indian-British entomologist named Javed Fazel (Larry Murphy) sleeps in Tina's room, while Ed Samuels and his wife Nora (Melissa Bardin Galsky) sleep in Gene's room. Linda forces the guests to participate in bed and breakfast events such as telling each other embarrassing moments. However, Javed, Ed and Nora are not enjoying it, and wish they were at a different bed and breakfast. Linda is annoyed by the guests' incompetence, while Louise is happily going to sleep in her room on her own.

The next morning, Bob is relieved to get back to work to avoid the guests, and talks to Teddy about it. Teddy praises the bed and breakfast to Linda and she suggests that he should be her guest (and the only perfect guest) by using Louise's room as his room. Bob is unsure about Louise's reaction to it, as she would possibly murder Bob and Linda, explaining that at one time when Linda vacuumed in there, she refused to talk to Linda for a week. Linda moves Teddy into Louise's room and Louise loses her temper, meanwhile Linda drags Louise over the floor and Louise says to Teddy, "I will see you in Hell, Teddy, I will see you in Hell!" as she vows vengeance to Teddy. During a wine and cheese mix, Linda forces Javed to join but he has to watch his insects mate with the queen (Tina comes along with him to watch) and Louise threatens Teddy that he has one hour to leave her room or she'll retaliate. An hour later, Louise sprays Javed's synthetic queen beetle pheromones on Teddy's pillow while a surprised Linda discovers the Samuels are performing BDSM in bed. While her family is asleep, Louise sneaks out of the bedroom (having spent some time standing over the bed) and releases Javed's beetles into Teddy's room.

Teddy wakes up, unaware of the beetles covering his face, and scares the family and Javed with his appearance. Linda blames Louise for the incident and grounds her, sending her to Linda's room and locking the door. Teddy barely reacts to it, mentioning that his only fear is of costumed characters, due to an incident where a man dressed up as a seal was having an affair with his ex-wife. Louise overhears what Teddy said through the air vent and calls a costumed character company to order dozens of them to arrive at the restaurant. Linda upgrades Teddy to platinum status, locks the other guests inside their rooms (the Samuels were going to leave) until her ice cream social, and orders Bob to make a bacon burger for Teddy. The costumed characters arrive at the restaurant, causing a terrified Teddy to beat them up. Bob settles it and explains the incident to Linda, and reprimands her for locking the unappreciative guests in their rooms. However, Linda reveals that she lost the key. Knowing she picks locks, Linda apologizes to Louise and asks her to unlock the guests' doors. Louise unlocks Javed's room (who is unaware that the door was locked the whole time), and Linda discovers that the Samuels are stuck after attempting to climb down out of the window. Linda helps them in, though only after forcing them to leave their e-mail addresses and recommend the bed and breakfast to their friends. Everything becomes settled as the guests leave, the costumed characters leave and also get paid by Bob, and Teddy overcomes his fears by going out with an owl costumed person (whom he first thinks to be a woman, but is really a man).

== Reception ==
In its original American broadcasting, "Bed and Breakfast" was viewed by an estimated 4.10 million viewers and received a 2.5 rating/7% share among adults between the ages of 18 and 49, a drop from the last episode.

Rowan Kaiser of The A.V. Club gave the episode B+, saying "Remember back at the very beginning of The Simpsons, when Bart was the main character? He got all the t-shirts, he got all the catch-phrases, and who could forget this on their Top 40 radio stations? Rather quickly, the Simpsons' creative team realized that Homer, not Bart, was their star. Something similar might be happening with Bob's Burgers, where Bob, who is not in any way a bad character, is typically overshadowed by his ridiculously funny children. In tonight's episode, Bob is pushed just slightly into the background, the kids get a few more lines, and it turns into a bit of a mess, but it's an often-funny and charming mess."
