= The Unnatural (Bob's Burgers) =

- Bob's Burgers episode
- Episode no.: Season 3 Episode 23
- Directed by: Wes Archer
- Written by: Greg Thompson
- Production code: 3ASA10
- Original air date: May 12, 2013

Guest appearances
- Kurt Braunohler as Vagrant; David Herman as Coach; Rob Huebel as the Deuce; Brian Huskey as Regular Sized Rudy; Jay Johnston as Jimmy Pesto; Andy Kindler as Mort; Jason Mantzoukas as Mr. Manoogian; Laura Silverman as Andy Pesto; Sarah Silverman as Ollie Pesto

Episode chronology
← Previous "Carpe Museum"	Next → "A River Runs Through Bob"
- Bob's Burgers season 3

"The Unnatural" is the 23rd episode and season finale of the third season of the animated comedy series Bob's Burgers and the overall 45th episode, and is written by Greg Thompson and directed by Wes Archer. It aired on Fox in the United States on May 12, 2013.

== Plot ==
Linda and Gene are excitedly showing off Gene's new baseball uniform at the restaurant. Everyone is impressed to various degrees and Bob is quick to show off something of his own; a new espresso machine. Bob offers a cup to Teddy who vehemently declines, so Tina drinks it. She quickly acquires a taste for it, bringing a thermos full of coffee along to Gene's first baseball game and rapidly chattering about anything that comes to mind, much to Louise's amusement.

After an abysmal first game where Gene causes his team to lose due his fear of the ball, Linda resolves to help Gene. First she has Bob train him but their little game of catch dissolves into garbage throwing and injuries. Linda finds an ad for a pricey baseball camp online, run by "The Deuce", and filled with obvious editing that faked good results. Bob is against spending over $400 for the obviously fake camp but Linda decides to sell something to raise the cash. When Linda's little baby figurines don't fetch much at a pawn shop, Louise convinces her to sell Bob's espresso machine. The next day, Teddy decides to try a cup of espresso after all, and not having thought he'd actually make a sale, Louise and Linda play dumb about Bob's missing espresso machine. Jimmy Jr. stops by and spills the beans about Gene being at the expensive baseball camp because his younger brothers, Andy and Olly, are there too.

Tina, in a caffeine withdrawal craze, breaks some of her mom's baby figurines to try and force a confession out of her. It works and an angry Bob drags the family down to the baseball field to get their money back. When he finds the field empty, they use information in The Deuce's abandoned duffel bag and stumble upon Gene and the campers hitting a motel soda machine with bats at the instruction of The Deuce who was getting revenge for being evicted from his motel room. Bob immediately accuses The Deuce of being a fraud but Linda defends him and they ultimately decide to set up a game in a nearby vacant lot; if Gene really has improved, then The Deuce can keep their money. On the first throw, Gene manages to hit the ball and despite Bob's disbelief and anger, it counts. In the end, The Deuce drives off and Bob reluctantly admits he's glad Gene's happy with his improvement. All the baseball camp kids celebrate in Bob's car by spraying a soda can around while Tina's left behind at the motel, chugging out of an old, communal coffee pot, still feeling the need for caffeine.

== Reception ==
Pilot Viruet of The A.V. Club gave the episode an A, saying "For most of the episode Bob is, as Linda so eloquently puts it, 'such a dick'. It was a little odd watching him enthusiastically root against his son but it made watching him eventually lose—and watching Linda really hold her own in an argument—that much funnier. By the end of the day, Linda and Bob are screaming each other, their car is soaked in soda, and Tina is chugging coffee and cigarette butts straight out of the pot because hey, they're not a family that's known for quiet dignity. It's a weird and great ending to a weird and great season."

The episode received a 1.6 rating and was watched by a total of 3.38 million people. This made it the fourth most watched show on Animation Domination that night, beating The Cleveland Show but losing to Family Guy with 4.82 million.
