= Hamburger Dinner Theater =

- Bob's Burgers episode
- Episode no.: Season 1 Episode 5
- Directed by: Wes Archer
- Written by: Dan Fybel; Rich Rinaldi
- Production code: 1ASA05
- Original air date: February 20, 2011

Guest appearances
- Toby Huss as The Robber; Andy Kindler as Mort; Jerry Minor as Officer Julia; Wendy Molyneux as Barbara's friend; Larry Murphy as Teddy; Holly Schlesinger as Barbara; Sam Seder as Officer Cliffany

Episode chronology
← Previous "Sexy Dance Fighting"	Next → "Sheesh! Cab, Bob?"
- Bob's Burgers season 1

"Hamburger Dinner Theater" is the fifth episode of the first season of the animated television series Bob's Burgers. "Hamburger Dinner Theater" originally aired on the Fox Network in the United States on February 20, 2011.

The episode was written by Dan Fybel & Rich Rinaldi and directed by Wes Archer. According to Nielsen ratings, it was viewed by 4.87 million viewers in its original airing. The episode featured guest performances by Toby Huss, Larry Murphy, Andy Kindler, Jerry Minor, Sam Seder, Holly Schlesinger and Wendy Molyneux.

== Plot ==
As the episode begins, Linda is getting ready to go out for the evening. She tells Bob she is going to a strip club with her friends, but Bob does not believe her and eventually gets her to admit she is really going to a dinner theater. Bob hates dinner theater, especially since every time Linda goes to one she spends the next week communicating only in song, which Bob finds annoying. The next morning, favorite customer Mort (Andy Kindler), also a fan of dinner theater, tells Linda since she works at a restaurant she could set up a dinner theater of her own. Linda is excited, but Bob objects, finally relenting as long as there are only three performances.

Linda concocts a mass murder-mystery-musical-love story set in a morgue and titles it "Dreamatorium". She casts the kids, Mort and herself in the play, but Bob refuses to take part beyond making the food. Tina is cast as a tree due to a history of stage fright. The kids make the set and Mort creates the props. On the night of the play, Mort's death is accompanied by gory, overly realistic fake blood and organs, and the audience is appalled, some even calling the police, who briefly investigate the show.

Linda decides to do another performance, much to Bob's dismay. Tina wants to say a line to conquer her stage fright, but during the performance she freezes, and Louise says her line. At the climax, Linda reveals that she committed the murders, although in the prologue she said her character was not the killer; she says it is a twist ending, but the audience angrily disagrees. Suddenly a robber (Toby Huss) appears with a gun and demands all the money in the cash register. Realizing that they are putting on a show, the robber sings beautifully to Linda, who improvises lyrics in return. Bob protests that the robber is not part of the show, but no one believes him. Even the police drive by, see the robbery, and drive on, assuming it is staged for the play. The robber leaves with the money as everybody praises his performance.

Bob reports the crime the next day to Officers Julia and Cliffany (Jerry Minor & Sam Seder) while Mort reads positive reviews to Linda. A blond man walks in the restaurant, asking about the robbery. Once the police are gone, he reveals himself to be the robber and offers to appear in the show again for the third and final performance. Linda is all for it, but Bob calls 911, so the robber produces the gun, robs them again, and flees, only to be caught by Officers Julia and Cliffany. Linda is disappointed and upset with Bob. She is dispirited during the last performance, especially since the audience cannot wait for the "twist ending" of the robbery. When the play finishes, the viewers are disgruntled when the special star does not appear. Bob disguises himself and performs the role of the robber, and he and Linda improvise a brief song, concluding to discover everyone has left the restaurant. Tina finally spits out her one line, and declares that she is cured of her stage fright.

== Reception ==
In its original American broadcasting, "Hamburger Dinner Theater" was viewed by an estimated 4.81 million viewers and received a 2.7 rating/4% share among adults between the ages of 18 and 49, an increase than last week's episode. Rowan Kaiser of The A.V. Club gave the episode a B+, saying "I'm happy that Linda gets to be the focus of the episode, as a bit too often she slides over into the "nagging wife" category of cartoon characters. Bob's easy interactions with the other characters, including his wife, are also probably the show's strength. If this episode has a weakness, it's that Louise is somewhat sidelined, with her Canada-hatred and all. Still, this kind of show, focusing on the family's often-hilarious interactions with one another, is the Bob's Burgers I've been waiting for. I hope that this is the turning point towards something great."
