= Spaghetti Western and Meatballs =

- Bob's Burgers episode
- Episode no.: Season 1 Episode 9
- Directed by: Wes Archer
- Written by: Kit Boss
- Production code: 1ASA10
- Original air date: March 27, 2011

Guest appearances
- David Herman as Mr. Frond; Andy Kindler as Mort; Larry Murphy as Teddy; Brian Posehn as Choo-Choo

Episode chronology
← Previous "Art Crawl"	Next → "Burger War"
- Bob's Burgers season 1

"Spaghetti Western and Meatballs" is the ninth episode of the first season of the animated television series Bob's Burgers. The episode originally aired on the Fox network in the United States on March 27, 2011.

The episode was written by Kit Boss and directed by Wes Archer. According to Nielsen ratings, it was viewed by 4.65 million viewers in its original airing. The episode featured guest performances by David Herman, Andy Kindler, Larry Murphy and Brian Posehn.

== Plot ==
As the episode begins Bob and Louise are about to start playing "Burn Unit", a game they play at night where they flip through the channels and make sarcastic comments about what is on television. During the course of this game, Bob stumbles across his favorite movie, a spaghetti Western called "Banjo", and calls a halt to the game. Gene comes through the living room carrying a plunger, apparently preparing to clog the toilet, and becomes entranced with the film as well. He joins his father and sister on the couch, which does not sit well with Louise as she feels Gene is encroaching on her special time with Bob.

The next morning at breakfast, Linda receives a call from Wagstaff School's counselor, Mr. Frond, about providing food for the school's upcoming conflict resolution fundraising dinner where Tina is to perform in a skit. She volunteers Bob's services to cook spaghetti and meatballs, which Bob does not appreciate for three reasons. One, the gig is unpaid. Two, he does not like Mr. Frond, referring to him as a "tall drink of annoying". Lastly, he suspects the only reason Linda wanted the responsibility was so she can one-up one of her PTA rivals, Colleen Caviello, who made baked ziti for the same fundraiser the previous year that everybody enjoyed. He eventually agrees, but vows to "half-ass" it.

Gene arrives in the kitchen with Louise's "Little Princess" toy guitar. When asked why, Gene reveals that "Banjo" has inspired him to take on "Choo-Choo" (Brian Posehn), a classmate who destroys Gene's joke-cracking by blurting the punchlines before Gene can. So, at lunch that day, Gene waits for Choo-Choo to sit down before confronting him. Each time Choo-Choo tries to finish Gene's joke, Gene hits a button on the guitar to interrupt him. Gene then says the punchline and tells Choo-Choo not to do it again, although Choo-Choo is more annoyed than anything. Louise, meanwhile, is left alone because Gene usually eats his lunch with her and they play a game called "Food Court".

After school, an excited Gene tells everyone at Bob's Burgers about what he did at lunch. Louise decides to see if Bob wants to play Burn Unit that evening, which includes a Spanish-language airing of Beetlejuice. Bob instead shows Louise a major purchase he made that day: a DVD box set of all of the "Banjo" films. Louise, out of frustration, begins stabbing at the DVDs with a fork, causing Bob to pull them away. She is left to try to bond with Tina, whom she finds dull and boring, and Linda, who gives her a makeover she does not want.

The next day, Mr. Frond is demonstrating to the conflict resolution group a process he calls ABS (pronounced as written), which is an acronym for a three step conflict resolution (Access your feelings, Be apologetic, and Slap it!). Tina, Jimmy Pesto Jr. and classmate Jocelyn rehearse their skit, but after class Tina threatens Jocelyn that if she actually does "for real" what she does in the skit, Tina will punch her in the face repeatedly.

At lunchtime, Gene keeps acting like Banjo to Choo-Choo, who still finds Gene's game more annoying than threatening. Louise's frustrations finally boil over and she confronts Gene about how he has been acting. This sets off a giant food fight and Bob is called to the school by Mr. Frond to deal with Gene and Louise. Frond sees this as a perfect opportunity to demonstrate ABS in person, but neither Gene nor Louise is particularly receptive and Bob mocks Frond for his methods failing. After losing control of the situation, which includes Frond and Bob getting physical with each other, a frustrated Frond finally hands down punishment for everyone involved. Gene and Louise are sentenced to detention after school, and Frond cancels the spaghetti dinner portion of the fundraiser.

Linda is furious when she finds out all the specifics. She told Bob she had to call in several favors (two, to be exact) to get the job and to punish everyone involved she was taking the "Banjo" box set and locking it in her jewelry drawer. Tina, meanwhile, is greatly upset to the point where she cannot do her job downstairs in the restaurant, so she locks up for the day not realizing customers were still inside.

At detention the next day, Louise continues to egg on both Gene and Choo-Choo, who also was given detention and is furious that Gene ruined his "perfect record" by getting him in trouble. After detention lets out, Choo-Choo decides to physically fight Gene. Bob arrives to pick Gene and Louise up just in time to see this and grabs Choo-Choo to stop him from attacking Gene, but Choo-Choo's dad arrives seconds later and accuses Bob of trying to harm his son. Bob, Louise, and Gene take off for safety, with Choo-Choo and his dad in pursuit.

The Belchers take refuge inside a spiral slide where they cannot be spotted. Louise again causes trouble when she makes Bob and Gene believe she hears someone coming, but Bob reaches his breaking point with his daughter and tells her to apologize for getting Gene in trouble. Louise counters by saying she only did what she did because Bob and Gene stopped hanging out with her, and since she bonded better with the two of them than she did with Linda and Tina, she felt alone and sad. Bob then apologizes to Louise for making her feel left out the way he has and then the three decide that they also need to make things up to Linda and Tina for getting the spaghetti dinner cancelled.

At the fundraiser, Linda is forced to sit and stew while Colleen Caviello continues to brag about last year's dinner. Tina goes up on stage to announce the fundraiser's money take, but catches Jocelyn whispering something to Jimmy Jr.; thinking Jocelyn is gossiping about her, Tina screams, "I warned you, skank" and attacks Jocelyn. While the two fight Colleen cannot resist taking another swipe at Linda, who finally snaps and tells Colleen she and everyone else knows that she used store-bought spaghetti sauce in her baked ziti. This creates another fight, which turns the fundraiser into a free-for-all.

Just then, Bob and the kids show up with a serving cart full of spaghetti and meatballs. Mr. Frond tells Bob to leave, but Bob is willing to work on his ABS to try to defuse the situation. Frond agrees, if for nothing else but to calm down the heated crowd. Bob even offers spaghetti and meatballs to Choo-Choo and his dad when they show up a few moments later as a peace offering and everything seems to be just fine...until Louise once again starts a food fight.

== Reception ==
In its original American broadcasting, "Spaghetti Western and Meatballs" was viewed by an estimated 4.65 million viewers and received a 2.2 rating/6% share among adults between the ages of 18 and 49, an increase from last episode.

Rowan Kaiser of The A.V. Club gave the episode an A, saying "While the comedy level of the episode isn't quite as impressive as last week's parade of anuses, “Spaghetti Western And Meatballs” does manage to include a constant stream of jokes, like both other new episodes this week. Probably the best comes primarily from Bob's Burgers' somewhat underrated animation department, when Linda flashes back to last year's school fundraiser and the terror of slow-motion mothers complimenting a rival with their mouths full. It is utterly absurd, and it lasts long enough that it threatens to move into Family Guy-esque anti-humor, but it's built up and delivered brilliantly and is probably my favorite single bit of the night."
