= Torpedo (Bob's Burgers) =

- Bob's Burgers episode
- Episode no.: Season 1 Episode 13
- Directed by: Kyounghee Lim
- Written by: Dan Fybel; Rich Rindali
- Production code: 1ASA12
- Original air date: May 22, 2011

Guest appearances
- Kevin Kline as Mr. Fischoeder; Robert Ben Garant as Torpedo; Tim Heidecker as Burt Dellalucci; David Herman as Angel; Andy Kindler as Mort; Larry Murphy as Teddy; Eric Wareheim as Phil Finnegan

Episode chronology
← Previous "Lobsterfest"	Next → "The Belchies"
- Bob's Burgers season 1

"Torpedo" is the 13th episode and the season finale of the first season of the animated television series Bob's Burgers. The episode originally aired on the Fox network in the United States on May 22, 2011. The episode was written by Dan Fybel and Rich Rindali and directed by Kyounghee Lim.

== Plot ==
Bob and the family head off to a baseball game to see a new ad they bought. The ad is much smaller than Bob thought it would be, described as "a hot dog wrapper caught in the net." During the game, Tina notices that the town's team, the Wonderdogs, communicate by slapping each other on their buttocks. Gene becomes interested in the baseball park's mascot race (owned by Mr. Fischoeder) and wants to race with his hamburger costume. Bob becomes amazed when he finds out his baseball hero, Torpedo Jones (Robert Ben Garant) is playing for The Wonderdogs. Bob witnessed his infamous pitch fifteen years ago but Torpedo is now hitting rock bottom. After the game, Bob fails to find Mr. Fischoeder to get Gene in the race but instead, Gene asks Torpedo to participate. Torpedo agrees and befriends the family.

Bob and the family watch Gene's first race with Torpedo giving Gene advice, and Bob gives Torpedo a burger as a thank you for getting Gene into the race. Gene wins the race and a gold medal, but fails to promote Bob's Burgers. However, Torpedo compliments the burger and tells the audience and other players to eat at Bob's Burgers after the game. Later at Bob's Burgers, Tina asks Torpedo for a job with the team as a way to butt-slap with the handsome players, and gets hired. She is also required to give Torpedo a burger at every game. Torpedo gives Bob a baseball, and Bob notices it has the grease from Bob's Burgers on it. Bob deduces that Torpedo has been cheating.

Bob meets with Mr. Fischoeder and tells him about Torpedo cheating, but Mr. Fischoeder shows Bob that thanks to Torpedo's cheating, more people have been coming to baseball games. He also reveals that he is using support beams from the roller coaster to prop up the stadium seats and that the Wonderdog games are rigged. Bob continues giving Torpedo grease and the kids learn about it. Louise tells Gene to cheat in his next mascot race by pushing the competitors. Gene wins his second gold medal in a row and hopes to make a record of winning three in a row. After finding out about Gene's cheating, Linda forbids anyone in the house from cheating. Bob tells Torpedo not to cheat but to try his best to win at baseball. After trying to convince Torpedo not to cheat, Bob reveals that he is his and Gene's role model, but Torpedo plays up a lie originally created by Louise that he cannot be his role model due to him being the same age as Bob. Torpedo also reveals that he cheated in every game, including his famous pitch. After explaining his methods of cheating, Torpedo tells Bob to "pick an old guy" as a role model. Gene is ready to cheat his third race so Bob tells Gene through a speaker that he should not cheat. Gene decides not to cheat and tries his best but gets pushed by a competitor and loses. As Bob is about to reveal Torpedo's cheating, the rollercoaster collapses. In the aftermath of the collapse, Mr. Fischoeder tells Bob that he reminds Fischoeder of his father. The episode ends with Tina trying to keep a jockstrap that belongs to a handsome Cuban player named Angel (David Herman) from Linda.

== Reception ==
In its original American broadcasting, "Torpedo" was viewed by an estimated 4.31 million viewers and received a 2.1 rating/6% share among adults between the ages of 18 and 49, a drop from last episode.

Rowan Kaiser of The A.V. Club gave the episode an A−, saying "Honestly, this is a pretty generic sitcom-style plot. A bit of corruption for one influential character here leads to further corruption amongst the innocent there. If it were a drama, it would get worse. It's a comedy, so it's easily fixed. But I guess as I grow older, I'm more forgiving of those generic plots. If it's done well—and Bob's Burgers has the characters to do it well—I'll like it. It's also nice to see a Gene-based episode, while most all of the other family members had several great moments— Louise's switchblade/lemon monologue, as ever, is a standout."
