= Crawl Space (Bob's Burgers) =

- Bob's Burgers episode
- Bob gets stuck in a wall while trying to repair a leak in the roof.
- Episode no.: Season 1 Episode 2
- Directed by: Kyoung Hee Lim
- Written by: Loren Bouchard; Jim Dauterive
- Production code: 1ASA02
- Original air date: January 16, 2011

Guest appearances
- David Herman as Mr. Frond; Larry Murphy as Teddy; Renée Taylor as Gloria

Episode chronology
← Previous "Human Flesh"	Next → "Sacred Cow"
- Bob's Burgers season 1

"Crawl Space" is the second episode of the first season of the animated comedy series Bob's Burgers. The episode originally aired on the Fox network in the United States on January 16, 2011.

The episode was written by Loren Bouchard and Jim Dauterive, and directed by Kyoung Hee Lim. According to Nielsen ratings, it was viewed in 5.066 million homes in its original airing. The episode featured guest performances by David Herman, Larry Murphy and Renée Taylor.

The original airing of this episode was dedicated to the memory of television producer Aron Abrams, who was found dead of a heart attack on Christmas Day, 2010.

== Plot ==
Linda annoys the family with her cleaning and preparations for her parents' visit. Bob decides to make his in-laws sleep in Gene's smelly room. When Linda forces Bob to fix the leak on the ceiling, he discovers a crawl space in the attic. As Grandma Gloria (Renée Taylor) and Grandpa Al arrive, Bob realizes that he can pretend that he's stuck in the crawlspace to avoid them.

Linda sends family friend and contractor Teddy (Larry Murphy) to rescue Bob, who tells him to come back the next day, after the in-laws leave. During the night, the kids overhear Gloria and Al having sex in Gene's bed; Tina (Bob’s oldest daughter) incorporates the sounds into a sexual-zombie nightmare, while Gene samples them for his keyboard. The next day, Gloria decides that she and Al will be extending their stay for another night. Linda finds out that Bob lied about being stuck before and is now really trapped, so she cancels Teddy's visit. Bob starts to go crazy, recording himself with a video camera and befriending Louise's green nightlight. Meanwhile, Gloria makes a tuna burger recipe called Tunami and Linda makes it the Burger of the Day. Bob dreams that he goes into a bar and later encounters Louise's nightlight, who alerts him about Gloria's subversive actions (The Tunami). The scene in the bar and the restroom facilities resembles a similar scene in the horror movie The Shining (1980).

While Bob is trapped, the kids get detention: Louise for lying about Bob's death (and reappearance as a ghost), Gene for presenting his NSFS samplings as a history report, and Tina for sneaking above the boys' changing room. The concerned counselor, Mr. Frond, believes they are "kids in crisis" and conducts a home visit, almost immediately threatening to call social services. As he is making the call, Gloria finds Bob unconscious and breaks through the kitchen wall, then orders Mr. Frond to hang up and never interfere with the family again. As she and Al leave, Louise fights Bob for her nightlight.

== Reception ==
In its original American broadcast, "Crawl Space" was viewed by an estimated 5.066 million viewers and received a 2.5 rating/6% share among adults between the ages of 18 and 49, a drop from the pilot episode.

Rowan Kaiser from The A.V. Club rated the episode a C, expressing disappointment with the "evil mother-in-law comes to visit!" cliché and feeling that many of the jokes fell flat. However, Kaiser found Bob's interactions with his kids one of the highlights of the episode, singling out Kristen Schaal's parts as Louise as the "best part of both episodes so far."
