= Art Crawl =

- Bob's Burgers episode
- Episode no.: Season 1 Episode 8
- Directed by: Kyounghee Lim
- Written by: Lizzie Molyneux; Wendy Molyneux
- Production code: 1ASA07
- Original air date: March 20, 2011

Guest appearances
- Andy Kindler as Mort; Jerry Minor as Officer Julia; Megan Mullally as Gayle; Larry Murphy as Teddy and Edith; Sam Seder as Harold; Laura Silverman as Andy Pesto; Sarah Silverman as Ollie Pesto

Episode chronology
← Previous "Bed & Breakfast"	Next → "Spaghetti Western and Meatballs"
- Bob's Burgers season 1

"Art Crawl" is the eighth episode of the first season of the animated television series Bob's Burgers. The episode originally aired on the Fox network in the United States on March 20, 2011.

The episode was written by Lizzie and Wendy Molyneux and was directed by Kyounghee Lim. According to the Nielsen ratings, it was viewed by 4.43 million viewers during its original airing. The episode featured guest performances by Andy Kindler, Jerry Minor, Megan Mullally, Larry Murphy, Sam Seder, Laura Silverman and Sarah Silverman.

== Plot ==
Bob and the kids walk through the town's annual art crawl while Linda's sister, Gayle, hangs her paintings in Bob's Burgers. When Louise makes fun of paintings displayed in the art supply store, Reflections, the Belchers are shooed away by the elderly owners, Edith and Harold.

Bob is horrified to return to the restaurant and discover that all of Gayle's paintings are of animal anuses; convinced that they will drive customers away, he takes them down to display the kids' artwork instead. Edith, chairperson of the art crawl, declares Gayle's anus paintings to be inappropriate and commends Bob for taking them down. Bob, not wanting to be told how to run his business, rebukes Edith and makes the paintings a permanent fixture of the restaurant.

Bob opens the restaurant the next morning to discover that someone has painted over Gayle's anus paintings with pink underwear. Assuming Edith is the culprit, Bob storms down to Reflections and defaces every painting in the store with black dots that are meant to be anuses.

Edith and Harold press charges against Bob for the vandalism. When Bob says he wants to press charges against Edith for the underwear paintings, Linda admits that she was the one who painted the underwear, as she could not bring herself to be honest with Gayle about how creepy she found them.

Gayle arrives with new versions of her paintings, which now include pants and "huge, pendulous breasts." The family is in shock, before Linda lies and tells her she loves them.

A subplot involves Louise trying to make money by selling bad art to tourists during the art crawl. After discovering that Gene and Tina have no artistic talent (despite Gene's attempt to become like van Gogh by having Louise try to cut his ear off), she recruits neighborhood kids instead, forcing them to work long hours while verbally abusing them and pocketing all the money. Louise later uses some of the money to pay back Edith and Harold for the damage Bob caused in Reflections. When Bob asks where she got it from, she simply replies, "It's art crawl."

== Reception ==
In its original American broadcasting, "Art Crawl" was viewed by an estimated 4.43 million viewers and received a 2.2 rating, a 6 percent share among adults between the ages of 18 and 49, an increase from last episode.

Rowan Kaiser of The A.V. Club gave the episode an A, saying "It's a great feeling to be there when a show filled with potential suddenly fulfills it. First off, because you can get the feeling that you're special for being one of the few million who was actually there, live, when Bob's Burgers went from good to great. Second of all, because you can't stop laughing at how ridiculously good "Art Crawl" is. Bob's Burgers has been developing several different threads, and they all work really well here: the ineffectual liberal antagonists, Bob's stubbornness when things don't work the way he thinks they should, Gene and Tina's absurd asides, Louise's megalomania, and Linda's intense willingness to make sure everything goes smoothly."
