= Sacred Cow (Bob's Burgers) =

- Bob's Burgers episode
- Episode no.: Season 1 Episode 3
- Directed by: Jennifer Coyle
- Written by: Nora Smith
- Production code: 1ASA04
- Original air date: January 23, 2011

Guest appearances
- Todd Barry as Moolissa; Larry Murphy as Teddy; Brendon Small as animal control guy; Paul F. Tompkins as Randy

Episode chronology
← Previous "Crawl Space"	Next → "Sexy Dance Fighting"
- Bob's Burgers season 1

"Sacred Cow" is the third episode of the first season of the animated comedy series Bob's Burgers. "Sacred Cow" originally aired on the Fox network in the United States on January 23, 2011.

The episode was written by Nora Smith and directed by Jennifer Coyle. According to Nielsen ratings, it was viewed in 4.81 million viewers in its original airing. The episode featured guest performances by Todd Barry, Larry Murphy, and Paul F. Tompkins.

== Plot ==
Bob celebrates the restaurant's 100,000th burger and puts it on sale for half-price. A controversial documentary filmmaker named Randy (Paul F. Tompkins) starts filming his new documentary outside the restaurant, and ties a cow, named "Moolissa" (a male cow with a blonde wig on it) outside the restaurant. Bob sees this, and Randy explains his challenge for him: he can kill Moolissa and make her into a burger, or let her live; he is to make his decision when a timer placed outside the restaurant, called the "Cow-ntdown," stops. Bob becomes embarrassed about the whole situation, as well as Louise frequently calling him a murderer. Despite this, as a result of the publicity, the restaurant starts attracting more customers.

Later that night, Bob has a nightmare where he is in court, accused of killing Moolissa, and loses the case. He wakes up and sees it is raining outside and finds that Randy has left Moolissa tied-up outside in the rain. Feeling sorry for Moolissa, Bob decides to let him into the house. While the children react positively to the idea, Linda demands that Bob put the animal back outside. However, they fail to get Moolissa down the stairs, and as a result he ends up staying inside with the Belchers. Randy finds Bob with the steer inside and reminds him that he has two days until the Cow-ntdown ends and to make his decision. The next morning, Linda reveals that she successfully let Moolissa out of the house (by putting him on a mattress with socks on), only to discover Moolissa missing.

Meanwhile, Tina and Louise discover that Moolissa's feces resembles a smiley face emoticon. This leads Tina to believe that Moolissa is sending messages to her through his feces. Louise then decides to prank Tina by shaping Moolissa's feces into emoticon symbols with a pastry bag to lead Tina into thinking that he is still sending messages to her. One night, however, Louise decides to shape the feces into the shape of an "angry face" emoticon. Tina becomes upset after reading this and decides it is time for her and Moolissa to move on.

With Moolissa stolen, the Belcher family and the film crew team up to look for her, and discover that the cow was taken by a couple as an attraction for their discount petting zoo. That night, they successfully take her back, and get back to the restaurant in time for the timer to end and for Bob to make his decision. However, Bob says he wants more time, leading to an argument between him and Randy. As they argue, they fail to notice that Moolissa is walking across the road into the path of a moving van. The van's driver is able to hit the brakes right before Moolissa gets hit, but Moolissa dies shortly after of a heart attack. Tina is saddened over his death, but discovers his feces shaped into a heart emoticon. Bob faints after her death and enters his subconscious, where he is in heaven with Moolissa (voiced by Todd Barry). Moolissa tells Bob that he wants him to make a burger out of him, and they share a passionate kiss. The next day, Bob holds a funeral for Moolissa at the restaurant and decides to name his 100,000th burger the "Rest in Peas burger" as the crew films it for the documentary.

== Reception ==
In its original American broadcasting, "Sacred Cow" was viewed by an estimated 4.18 million viewers and received a 2.2 rating/5% share among adults between the ages of 18 and 49, a drop from the first two episodes.

Rowan Kaiser of The A.V. Club gave the episode a B, saying "I'd like to see Bob's Burgers try to do some kind of plot other than “Someone comes along and annoys Bob.” The characters are all genuinely likable and funny, and the jokes build on one another nicely. It's worth a smile when Louise and Gene tell Bob that they're wired and ready to attack as they break into the petting zoo, and then the zoo's owner shows up, and they tear into her (“Gene! ATTACK!”), teeth and all, allowing the cow to be repossessed. There's enough to like here that it shouldn't have to fall into a storytelling rut... already."
