= Human Flesh =

- Bob's Burgers episode
- The restaurant being labeled as potentially having food containing "human flesh".
- Episode no.: Season 1 Episode 1
- Directed by: Anthony Chun
- Written by: Loren Bouchard; Jim Dauterive
- Production code: 1ASA01
- Original air date: January 9, 2011

Guest appearances
- Andy Kindler as Mort; Ron Lynch as Ron; Sam Seder as Hugo Habercore

Episode chronology
← Previous —	Next → "Crawl Space"
- Bob's Burgers season 1

"Human Flesh" is the first episode of the first season and the series premiere of the animated television series Bob's Burgers. It originally aired on the Fox network in the United States on January 9, 2011.

The episode was written by Loren Bouchard and Jim Dauterive, and directed by Anthony Chun. According to Nielsen ratings, it was viewed in 9.41 million homes in its original airing, making it the most viewed episode of the series. The episode featured guest performances by Andy Kindler, Ron Lynch, and Sam Seder.

== Plot ==
After numerous unsuccessful openings, Bob Belcher and his family reopen their gourmet burger restaurant, Bob's Burgers, anticipating success as the nearby attraction Wonder Wharf is getting "mobbed". Bob directs his son, Gene, to provide burger samples for people outside. However, when Gene offends mourners at a nearby crematorium, he drops burgers on the street, picking them up and continuing to offer them to people. The visiting health inspector Hugo and his assistant Ron immediately notice this, and investigate a rumor that their burgers are made of human flesh from the adjacent crematorium.

Upon entering the restaurant, Hugo is shocked to see Linda, Bob's wife, whom he was previously engaged to. Remembering how Linda left him for Bob many years ago, Hugo plots to close Bob's Burgers by falsely penalizing him for health code violations. He places a sign on the window claiming human remains are potentially located within the restaurant. He incites a growing crowd and fuels rumors against Bob's Burgers, which were originally created by Bob's youngest daughter Louise. As the public begins to protest and antagonize Bob, he becomes distressed when he realizes he forgot it was also his wedding anniversary. Despite Bob claiming the rumor is false, the situation becomes worse when a body from the funeral home ends up inside the restaurant.

Bob finally decides to address the crowd, and after initially succeeding, his words are interpreted by crowd members as him supporting cannibalism as Louise further perpetuates the rumor. Eventually, the situation escalates when an angry protester breaks the restaurant's window with a snow globe. Bob is sad, and tells Linda he feels like a failure and she would have been better off marrying Hugo, whom she earlier admitted had been a better kisser than Bob. However, Linda tells Bob she married him because he had a dream for their future, whereas Hugo was a lonely man with no dream. Louise apologizes to Bob for creating the initial rumor.

Being encouraged by Linda, Bob cooks for the family until a van of an exotic eating club appears. They are interested in eating human flesh, and Bob exploits the situation by charging $50 per burger with alleged human meat. Ron approaches and tells Bob that he and Hugo conducted tests that concluded the burgers contain legal ingredients. Pleased with his restaurant finally succeeding, Bob takes Linda to the local theme park to celebrate their anniversary.

== Background ==
The plot of "Human Flesh" is based on the original premise for Bob's Burgers, in which the Belchers were a family of cannibals who actually did make their burgers from human flesh. This idea was eventually scrapped, and the overall tone and direction of the show changed.

== Reception ==
In its original American broadcast, "Human Flesh" was viewed by an estimated 9.41 million viewers and received a 4.5 rating/11% share among adults between the ages of 18 and 49 making it the highest-rated new series premiere of the season.

The episode received mixed reviews from critics. Metacritic gave an aggregate score of 53 or "mixed or average reviews". IGN's Jonah Krakow rate the episode with a 7.5/10, praising the children's performance. Krakow also noted the episode "laid some solid groundwork with the introduction of the awful Belcher children", enjoying Louise's characterization. However, Krakow opined the episode felt similar to FOX's other Sunday shows, with "the patriarch screwing up and spending the rest of the episode making amends." In his review for TV Squad, Joel Keller said that "for all of it's [sic] irreverence and oddity, there's a sweet tone underneath that makes the show more accessible than most of its [Adult Swim] cousins" and enjoyed the episode's comedic tone.

Emily VanDerWerff of The A.V. Club gave the episode a positive review, enjoying the writing and crediting Bouchard, Benjamin, and Schaal for improving the quality of Bob's Burgers. She ultimately commented that "Bob's Burgers isn't there just yet, but it's trying enough interesting stuff to be worth a look, and it wouldn't be a surprise if it gelled and became the best show in the animated lineup fairly quickly."
