= Sexy Dance Fighting =

- Bob's Burgers episode
- Bob has to cover for Tina when she takes a martial arts class.
- Episode no.: Season 1 Episode 4
- Directed by: Anthony Chun
- Written by: Steven Davis; Kelvin Yu
- Production code: 1ASA06
- Original air date: February 13, 2011

Guest appearances
- Jon Glaser as Jairo; Andy Kindler as Mort; Larry Murphy as Teddy

Episode chronology
← Previous "Sacred Cow"	Next → "Hamburger Dinner Theater"
- Bob's Burgers season 1

"Sexy Dance Fighting" is the fourth episode of the first season of the animated comedy series Bob's Burgers. The episode originally aired on the Fox network in the United States on February 13, 2011.

The episode was written by Steven Davis and Kelvin Yu and directed by Anthony Chun. According to Nielsen ratings, it was viewed in 4.19 million viewers in its original airing. The episode featured guest performances by Jon Glaser, Larry Murphy, and Andy Kindler.

== Plot ==
Tina is hitting puberty by lying on the kitchen floor, groaning in front of her family. Bob orders Tina to do her grill cooking job as their father-daughter time. Gene and Louise later show Tina a surprise outside the restaurant while Bob works alone, revealing to Tina a capoeira class where she begins to have a crush on the long-haired headmaster, Jairo (Jon Glaser).

Tina signs up for the class and practices capoeira a lot at home, but the rest of the family compares capoeira to dancing. Tina becomes more interested in Jairo and extends her classes to see him more. Meanwhile, the other kids fail at taking over Tina's grill cooking position and Bob needs to go to the toilet at 4:30 like he usually does (he refers to it as an afternoon meeting) but Tina is not at the restaurant to cover for him. Bob postpones his meeting and goes to the capoeira studio to demand that Tina go back into the restaurant. While there, Bob meets Jairo and criticizes him and capoeira. Jairo forces Bob to have a duel with him, which he easily wins by whipping his hair at him and making him fall and embarrassingly poop in his pants. Bob wants his family to never mention what happened at the class and forbids Tina from continuing to attend the class. Tina resumes lying on the floor and groaning throughout the rest of night. Jairo visits the restaurant the next day after receiving a letter from Tina (which was actually from Louise who forged Tina's name to get her father to take revenge on Jairo for the incident) and suggests that Tina should come back because next week all attenders will get promoted to yellow cord. Tina goes with Jairo and quits her job at the restaurant.

The family goes to Tina's promotion except for Bob who stays to take care of the restaurant. While Tina is getting ready for her yellow cord, Bob gets in a huge argument with Teddy but later calms down and closes the restaurant to watch Tina with Linda and the kids. The other attendants receive their yellow cord, but not Tina who did not perform the studio's five elementary motions. Bob criticizes this and claims that Tina deserves the cord. They later get into another fight at 4:30 as Bob is aware of his 'meeting'. Jairo frequently trips and embarrasses Bob during the fight, but Tina supports her father for getting beat up to defend her. Angry with Jairo, Tina quits and returns to the grill, enjoying her father-daughter time with Bob where he gives her yellow gloves.

Bob tries to make Gene and Louise stay and work as well, until Louise points they're not on the schedule, and they leave for the pier to record the sounds of poking and slapping a dead seal.

== Reception ==
In its original American broadcasting, "Sexy Dance Fighting" was viewed by an estimated 4.19 million viewers and received a 2.1 rating/5% share among adults between the ages of 18 and 49, a drop from the early episodes. Rowan Kaiser of The A.V. Club, gave the episode C+, saying "This episode was also weaker overall than most of the previous Bob's Burgers. Bob going and confronting the capoeira instructor while skipping his 4:30 "meeting" causes some laughs, both in its dancing-around-the-meeting issue and in its outright hammering home of its poop jokes. And Kristen Schaal's Louise remains a kind of force of nature, pulling out kitchen implement after kitchen implement for Bob to use for his revenge against the instructor."
