= Burger War (Bob's Burgers) =

- Bob's Burgers episode
- Episode no.: Season 1 Episode 10
- Directed by: Boohwan Lim
- Written by: Loren Bouchard
- Production code: 1ASA03
- Original air date: April 10, 2011

Guest appearances
- Kevin Kline as Mr. Fischoeder; David Herman as Trev; Jay Johnston as Jimmy Pesto; Andy Kindler as Mort; Larry Murphy as Teddy; Laura Silverman as Andy; Sarah Silverman as Ollie

Episode chronology
← Previous "Spaghetti Western and Meatballs"	Next → "Weekend at Mort's"
- Bob's Burgers season 1

"Burger War" is the tenth episode of the first season of the animated television series Bob's Burgers. The episode originally aired on the Fox network in the United States on April 10, 2011.

The episode was written by Loren Bouchard and directed by Boohwan Lim. According to Nielsen ratings, it was viewed by 4.00 million viewers in its original airing. The episode featured guest performances by Kevin Kline, David Herman, Jay Johnston, Andy Kindler, Larry Murphy, Laura Silverman and Sarah Silverman.

== Plot ==
Bob and the family are waiting at the restaurant for their eccentric landlord Mr. Fischoeder, to see if he will renew the business lease. When Fischoeder arrives he warns Bob that his business rival, Jimmy Pesto, wants to build a gift shop on the current site of Bob's restaurant. Bob is forced to either pay the rent within the next few days or else his lease will not be renewed.

As they are always late with payment, Bob and Linda are unsure of how they will make the deadline. Bob complains that Tina is in love with Jimmy Jr. and both Gene and Louise are friends with the twins, Andy and Ollie Pesto. These relationships are at odds with Bob's own feud with Pesto. When the kids arrive home from school, Jimmy Sr. puts a banner on his restaurant saying his restaurant is now also serving burgers. Bob and Linda head over to Pesto's to complain. Meanwhile, the kids sneak into Jimmy Pesto's and reveal that Bob's regular customers Mort and Teddy eat at Jimmy's restaurant as well. As Jimmy continues trying to get Bob's Burgers to close, the Belchers devise methods of obtaining the rent money, with Bob and Linda taking suggestions from the kids. Gene suggests live music, Tina suggests slow dancing and Louise suggests voodoo. Linda suggests putting out flyers stating that the food will be half-price. Later that night, Jimmy tastes his own burger, criticizes it, and takes it off the menu.

On the day the rent is due, Louise plans to get Jimmy's hair to control his mind (through voodoo). Tina wants Louise to help her dance Jimmy Jr. back into remembering that they are dating, and Gene wants her to get him a music gig. Louise accepts the idea, but states she needs a lock of their hair (even Gene has to cut off his rat's tail). Louise makes a voodoo doll out of a potato with Tina's hair on it and asks Andy and Ollie to get their brother's hair for Tina, which they do. Louise comes back home with the twins who need to work on the voodoo dolls made out of potatoes, so Bob gets Gene and Tina to hand out the "half-price" flyers to the public.

Gene and Tina return home and mention that they gave a flyer to Jimmy Pesto, who subsequently decides to sell his own food that night at half-price to customers with a Bob's Burgers flyer. This leaves Bob with no customers; even Mort's mother decides to go to Jimmy Pesto's instead of Bob's (where Mort was going to take her). As a last resort, Bob's attempts to construct the difficult-to-make burger called the Meatsiah in bite-sized pieces. Bob gets Gene to sample them at Jimmy Pesto's restaurant, as a ploy to get customers to return to Bob's Burgers to have more.

Louise completes her voodoo potatoes in the basement but needs to get Jimmy Pesto's hair. Lying that the hair she wants is a donation for mustache cancer, she finds out that his restaurant's piano player is sick. Louise decides to tell Gene that he can perform a gig there. Gene arrives for his gig and Louise plays the drums with him. As Gene's wish comes true, Tina slow dances with Jimmy Jr. Linda discovers that Gene is playing his first gig so she goes there to watch.

Bob finishes making his burger only to realize that his family went to Jimmy Pesto's. Bob goes over, wearing Gene's burger suit with the burgers as samples. Bob gives the customers burgers and ends up having a fight with Jimmy outside the building. Mr. Fischoeder arrives after Bob and Jimmy have stopped fighting, and he lets them and the others go to Bob's Burgers to get the rent. Bob claims that he does not have the rent money, so Mr. Fischoeder announces the restaurant lease will not be renewed. However, as he is doing so, he smells the Meatsiah burgers and tastes them. Mr. Fischoeder realizes that Bob does not care about high-volume business, but rather, cares about the quality of his food, so he lets the restaurant lease be extended under some circumstances.

The episode ends with Gene playing music, and Tina slow dancing with Jimmy Jr., Then Louise realizes that the voodoo has worked, as Gene finally got to play to a live audience, Tina was finally able to dance with Jimmy Pesto's son, then Louise believed to be God. Andy and Ollie get out of the basement and dance along with the other dancing customers as Jimmy Sr. angrily walks back to his restaurant.

== Reception ==
In its original American broadcasting, "Burger War" was viewed by an estimated 4.00 million viewers and received a 1.9 rating/5% share among adults between the ages of 18 and 49, a drop from the previous episode; and became the lowest rated episode of the season despite being the second lowest rated episode of that night, beating American Dad that night.

Rowan Kaiser of The A.V. Club gave the episode a B+, saying "The minor serialization—world-building might be a better phrase for it—of the show comes into play here. Many one-off characters return, including Fischoeder and the twins, and their roles are expanded, their stories brought into sync with the absurd psychology of the Belcher clan. Louise brings Ollie and Andy into a voodoo plot. Tina wants to slow-dance with Jimmy Jr., who has made that his life, and Gene wants to be a musician. It all ends up being a big, bizarre mess but a pleasant one, held together largely by Kristen Schaal's always excellent voice-acting, as well as Kevin Kline, who gets into the swing of things by the end of the episode."
