= Fired Up (TV series) =

- Genre: Sitcom
- Created by: Arleen Sorkin; Paul Slansky
- Starring: Sharon Lawrence; Leah Remini; Mark Feuerstein; Jonathan Banks; Francesca P. Roberts
- Composer: Mark Mothersbaugh
- Country of origin: United States
- Original language: English
- No. of seasons: 2
- No. of episodes: 28 (5 unaired)

Production
- Executive producers: Victor Fresco; Kelsey Grammer; Rudy Hornish
- Camera setup: Multi-camera
- Running time: 30 minutes
- Production companies: Grammnet Productions; Paramount Television

Original release
- Network: NBC
- Release: April 10, 1997 – February 9, 1998

Fired Up is an American sitcom television series created by Arleen Sorkin and Paul Slansky, that aired on NBC from April 10, 1997, to February 9, 1998, for two seasons and 28 episodes. The series, the first from Grammnet Productions, starred Sharon Lawrence as a self-centered promotions executive and Leah Remini as her mouthy assistant. When the pair got fired from their jobs, they teamed up to create a business as equal partners. The tagline of the series was "First she got fired, then she got fired up."

== Plot ==
Gwendolyn Leonard epitomized the term "self-involved." After being fired from her corporate job, she was reduced to moving in with her former assistant, spunky Terry Reynolds, and starting up a new promotions business as her partner. Terry and her brother Danny shared a loft apartment atop a clock tower in New York City, and Danny worked as bartender at Clockworks, the restaurant below, while he pursued his dream of becoming a writer. Clockworks was owned by Guy Mann, an average Joe who adamantly pursued Gwen, though she kept him at arm's length (his response to each of her blow-offs was "Oh, yeah!").

Also regularly seen was Mrs. Francis, a crotchety unemployment agent whom Gwen ultimately inspired to quit her job and open an eggroll shop; Ashley Mann, Guy's son who worked as a female impersonator; Scott Bickley, Danny's lecherous agent who moonlighted as a suit salesman; and in later episodes Steve Summer, a former classmate of Gwen's who has carried a torch for her for decades.

== Cast ==
- Sharon Lawrence as Gwen Leonard
- Leah Remini as Terry Reynolds
- Mark Feuerstein as Danny Reynolds
- Jonathan Banks as Guy Mann

=== Recurring ===
- Mark Davis as Ashley Mann
- Francesca P. Roberts as Mrs. Francis
- Timothy Omundson as Scott Bickley
- Thomas F. Wilson as Steve Summer

=== Notable guest stars ===
- Kelsey Grammer as Tom Whitman
- D. W. Moffett as James Collins
- Dixie Carter as Rita Leonard
- Jack Scalia as Frank Reynolds
- Nicole Sullivan as Debbie
- Don Cornelius as himself
- Randee Heller as Tina Reynolds
- John Aniston as Gordon

== Episodes ==
=== Series overview ===
Season	Episodes	Originally released	
Season	Episodes	First released	Last released
1	8	April 10, 1997	June 23, 1997
2	20	September 22, 1997	February 9, 1998

=== Season 1 (1997) ===
No. overall	No. in season	Title	Directed by	Written by	Original release date	Prod. code	Viewers (millions)
1	1	"Pilot"	James Burrows	Story by : Arleen Sorkin & Paul Slansky; Teleplay by : Arleen Sorkin & Paul Slansky & Victor Fresco	April 10, 1997	001	26.64
2	2	"The Next Day"	James Burrows	Victor Fresco	April 17, 1997	002	22.09
3	3	"Who's the Boss"	Max Tash	Arleen Sorkin & Paul Slansky	April 24, 1997	003	25.39
4	4	"They Sell Horses, Don't They?"	Rod Daniel	Kit Boss	May 1, 1997	004	21.84
5	5	"A Concurrent Affair"	James Burrows	Linda Teverbaugh & Mike Teverbaugh	May 8, 1997	008	22.29
6	6	"The Rules"	David Lee	Aron Abrams & Gregory Thompson	May 15, 1997	006	19.55
7	7	"Are We Not Friends?"	Will Mackenzie	Thom Bray & Michael A. Ross	May 15, 1997	005	22.61
8	8	"Under Pressure"	James Burrows	Danny Zuker	June 23, 1997	007	6.94

=== Season 2 (1997–98) ===
No. overall	No. in season	Title	Directed by	Written by	Original release date	Prod. code	Viewers (millions)
9	1	"The Mother of All Gwens"	Lee Shallat-Chemel	Victor Fresco	September 22, 1997	011	13.78
10	2	"Truth and Consequences"	Lee Shallat-Chemel	Arleen Sorkin & Paul Slansky	September 29, 1997	009	10.52
11	3	"You Don't Know Jack"	Jeff Melman	Kit Boss	October 6, 1997	013	11.48
12	4	"Swallow Your Bliss"	Lee Shallat-Chemel	Gregory Thompson & Aron Abrams	October 13, 1997	010	11.81
13	5	"Total Recall"	Gordon Hunt	Linda Teverbaugh & Mike Teverbaugh	October 20, 1997	014	11.78
14	6	"Beat the Clock"	Pamela Fryman	Gregory Thompson & Aron Abrams	October 27, 1997	015	9.88
15	7	"The Baby-Sitter's Club"	Pamela Fryman	Bill Barol	November 10, 1997	016	10.22
16	8	"In Your Dreams"	Will Mackenzie	Don Rhymer	November 17, 1997	023	11.10
17	9	"Honey, I Shrunk the Turkey"	Ken Levine	Kit Boss	November 24, 1997	017	9.83
18	10	"Ten Grand a Dance"	Will Mackenzie	Gregory Thompson & Aron Abrams	December 1, 1997	018	11.84
19	11	"Where There's Smoke"	Will Mackenzie	Michael A. Ross & Thom Bray	December 22, 1997	024	9.66
20	12	"You Go, Boss!"	Lee Shallat-Chemel	Kit Boss	January 12, 1998	022	8.67
21	13	"Beauty and the Priests"	Leonard R. Garner Jr.	Bill Barol	January 19, 1998	019	9.37
22	14	"Mission: and A-Hopin'"	Lee Shallat-Chemel	Linda Teverbaugh & Mike Teverbaugh	January 26, 1998	020	8.59
23	15	"Fire and Nice"	Lee Shallat-Chemel	Dwight D. Smith	February 9, 1998	021	8.88
24	16	"The Pajama Game"	Lee Shallat-Chemel	Lu Abbott Stacey & Berman Woodward	Unaired	025	N/A
25	17	"What I Really Want to Do Is Direct"	Randy Suhr	Paul Slansky & Arleen Sorkin	Unaired	026	N/A
26	18	"Lustline"	Lee Shallat Chemel	Story by : Bill Barol; Teleplay by : Thom Bray & Michael A. Ross	Unaired	027	N/A
27	19	"Domestic Bliss"	Lee Shallat Chemel	Craig Hoffman	Unaired	028	N/A
28	20	"With Sex, You Get Eggroll"	Max Tash	Thom Bray & Michael A. Ross	Unaired	012	N/A

== Broadcast history ==
Fired Up was a mid-season replacement on NBC. It premiered on April 10, 1997, and ended the first season on June 23 after 8 episodes. The second season premiered on September 22, 1997, and the last episode aired on February 9, 1998. It was a contemporary of shows like Caroline in the City and Suddenly Susan, and at one point, all three shows were part of a Monday-night promotion: "The Ladies of Monday Night."

Fired Up had a brief syndication run on the USA Network.

== Reception ==
Caryn James of The New York Times said the series had a "topical premise and an edgy lead character, just what most sitcoms lack" but that after a promising start, its first season episodes lost the "sharp writing this series needs."

Fired Up premiered in the "cushy Thursday night slot after Seinfeld" through May 15, 1997, on a night that NBC promoted as Must See TV. It started out strong in the ratings; the premiere garnered an 18.8 rating and 29 share, but after NBC changed its timeslot, the show lost its audience and NBC canceled it.
