= Ice cream social =

Social gathering

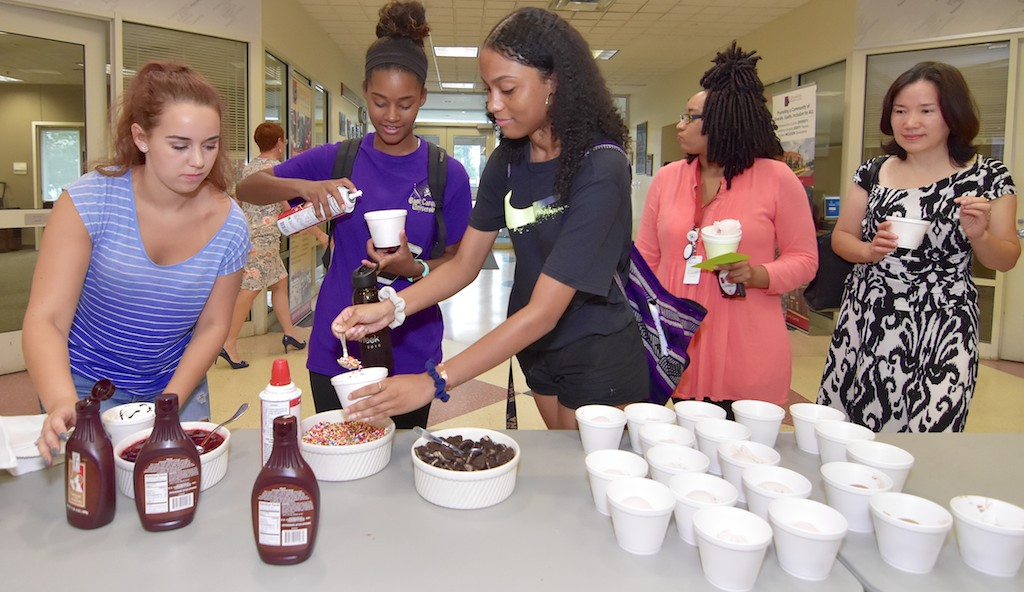
Ice cream social

An ice cream social or ice cream sociable is an informal social event at which the main focus is the serving and eating of ice cream. Ice cream socials typically include multiple ice cream flavors and a variety of toppings such as syrups, whipped cream, and sprinkles for guests to choose from. Such events often allow guests to assemble their own custom desserts or request specific ingredients from those serving them. The event developed in the United States in the 19th century.

== History ==
Ice cream was traditionally served in establishments called ice cream gardens, which were popular in the 19th century when women couldn't socialize in taverns and pubs.

As ice cream became more affordable in the 1800s with innovations in technology, community organizations such as schools and churches began hosting ice cream socials modeled after ice cream gardens. According to Jeffrey McQuain, the term "ice cream sociable" dates to 1873, and later terms included ice cream social and ice cream supper. The event grew to popularity in a variety of settings such as block parties. Games and music would occasionally appear. Organizations hosting ice cream socials were influenced by the opportunity to fundraise, as well as the temperance movement, as ice cream socials offered a sober, "good clean fun" way to socialize.

Ice cream socials during the 19th century featured limited flavors, as well as cakes or pies. Though many were sat outside in summer, emulating ice cream gardens, some were situated indoors in church or community halls. They were sometimes timed to coincide with major holidays such as the Independence Day or local events to showcase fresh, local produce. Ice cream consumption peaked in the United States in the 1920s, and events continued after the 1930s, particularly in rural areas. Some ice cream socials are still hosted by churches and other groups, albeit with increasing rarity.
