= Aron Abrams =

American television producer and writer

- Born: February 3, 1960; Emerson, New Jersey, U.S.
- Died: December 25, 2010 (aged 50); Waikoloa Village, Hawaii, U.S.
- Resting place: Hillside Memorial Park Cemetery
- Occupations: Television producer and writer
- Years active: 1996–2010

Aron Abrams (February 3, 1960 – December 25, 2010) was an American television producer and writer, whose works ranged from Everybody Hates Chris to Grounded for Life. Born in Emerson, New Jersey, Abrams landed several projects with famed producer Dino De Laurentiis before establishing himself as a comedy writer.

== Career ==
Abrams began his career in the 1990s, writing and producing episodes for shows like the short-lived Fired Up and Maggie.

Abrams then began to write for popular shows 3rd Rock from the Sun, Grounded for Life, King of the Hill (which he also served as a consulting producer) as well as Glenn Martin, DDS and Everybody Hates Chris. Nearly all of the aforementioned work was with fellow producer and writer Gregory Thompson.

== Death ==
On Christmas morning, 2010, Abrams was found dead in his luxury hotel suite by staff. Foul play was not suspected. Abrams is survived by his wife Lynn, his daughter Claire, her sister, nieces and two brothers, Michael, and Ian (also a writer).

His final television job was as a consulting producer on the Fox comedy Bob's Burgers. The episode 'Crawl Space' was dedicated to his memory.
