= Gregory Thompson (writer) =

American television producer and writer

- Occupations: Television producer and writer
- Years active: 1996–present

Gregory Thompson is an American television producer and writer. He graduated from University of Washington with a BA in English in 1983, where he was inducted into Phi Beta Kappa. He went on to get his masters at the Tuck School of Business at Dartmouth.

His credits include Fired Up, 3rd Rock from the Sun (co-producer), Maggie, Big Wolf on Campus, Grounded for Life, King of the Hill, Everybody Hates Chris and Glenn Martin, DDS. Nearly all of the aforementioned work was with fellow producer and writer Aron Abrams (1960–2010).

He is currently a writer and consulting producer on the Fox animated comedy Bob's Burgers. He has written episodes including "The Unnatural" and "The Millie-churian Candidate".
