= Bob Belcher =

Character from the animated sitcom Bob's Burgers

- Bob's Burgers character
- First appearance: "Human Flesh" (2011)
- Created by: Loren Bouchard
- Designed by: Dave Creek; Jay Howell
- Voiced by: H. Jon Benjamin; Jose Padilla (Spanish); Rene Sagastume (Spanish)

In-universe information
- Full name: Robert Eugene Belcher Jr.
- Gender: Male
- Occupation: Chef and owner of Bob's Burgers
- Family: Bob Belcher, Sr. (father); Lily Belcher (mother; deceased)
- Spouse: Linda Belcher (wife)
- Significant other: Barbara Bunkley (ex-partner)
- Children: Tina Belcher; Gene Belcher; Louise Belcher
- Relatives: Gertie (great-grandmother); Billy Lombard (grandfather); Alice Lombard (grandmother); Ernest Lombard (uncle)
- Home: Seymour's Bay, New Jersey
- Age: 46

Robert Eugene Belcher Jr. is the main protagonist of the animated sitcom Bob's Burgers created by Loren Bouchard for Fox. He is the often stressed, anxious patriarch of the Belcher family and owner of his restaurant Bob's Burgers. He is known for being a mild-mannered and pessimistic businessman, often having financial struggles in keeping the restaurant running and paying rent. He has a rivalry with the Italian restaurant owner across the street, Jimmy Pesto, and quarrels with local health inspector Hugo. Bob is a third-generation restaurant owner. He regularly comes up with ideas to improve his business and appeal to customers (in particular, having a new "burger of the day" for multiple years). He is portrayed as a family man, with a wife Linda and three children Louise, Gene, and Tina Belcher.

== Background ==
In 1967, Bob was born to Robert Belcher Sr. (nicknamed "Big Bob") and Lily Belcher. Bob went through many challenges as a child, such as losing his mother at age 13, having to work at his father's restaurant "Big Bob's Diner", and envying children that had toys and playtime. On Christmas of 1984, Bob was kicked out of the duplex after serving the "Baby you can chive my car burger" to Henry instead of his "normal" and, refusing to officially partner with Big Bob.

On September 3, 1993, Bob meets, begins a romantic relationship with, and marries Linda Belcher (née Genarro) at the City Hall. (Note: Shown in a photo hanging on the wall in Bob and Linda's room in "Slumber Party".) At some point, they buy the restaurant and have Tina, followed by Gene, then Louise two years later. The restaurant has its grand re-re-re opening after a utility pole falls into the glass window of the building, as evidenced in the series' intro and in the series' premiere.

== In popular culture ==
Bob Belcher has appeared numerous times outside of Bob's Burgers in other shows most notably The Simpsons, Family Guy, Archer, and Robot Chicken. In the fourth season episode "Fugue and Riffs", Bob's Burgers crosses over with Archer, both Bob Belcher and Sterling Archer being characters voiced by Benjamin.

Bob Belcher appears in Fortnite as a Father's Day celebration, being released in June 2025.

== Reception ==
Bob has been a generally well-received character, but not to a high degree. Following its release, multiple critics have given their opinions on Bob in The Bob's Burgers Movie. Hollywood in Toto stated that Bob is pushed to the sidelines too much, and not given enough screentime. Scott Tobias of The Guardian liked Bob's on-screen chemistry with Linda, which he believes is well established at the beginning of the show. Glenn Kenny of The New York Times appreciated the "relatively grounded in reality" plot of Bob trying to pay back the bank, as he is a provider for his family and it makes thematic sense.

In her review of the entire franchise, Rebecca Shaw of The Sydney Morning Herald goes into detail about how Bob is not working towards a greater goal, or hoping for wealth no matter how hard he tries. He is simply trying to provide for his family and make sure his kids will have better opportunities as adults. Lenny Burnham of Hardwood and Hollywood's review on season nine, episode seventeen ("What About Blob?") comments on the "fantastic scene" where Linda and Teddy insult Bob. In Chris Cabin's review of season two, he remarks that Bob's straight-man role, small-business-owner status, and melancholy relationship with his wife provides an original outlook.
