= List of Bob's Burgers characters =

The Belcher family. Gene, Louise, and Tina (Left to right, front row) Linda, Bob, and Teddy (Left to right, back row).

Bob's Burgers is an American animated sitcom created by Loren Bouchard for the Fox Broadcasting Company. It is centered on the Belcher family—parents Bob and Linda and their three children, Tina, Gene, and Louise—who run a burger restaurant and often go on adventures of many kinds. This is a list of characters from the animated television series. Main characters are listed first.

== Belcher family ==
=== Bob Belcher ===
Robert Eugene "Bob" Belcher Jr. (voiced by H. Jon Benjamin) is the main character of the series. He is the son of Robert "Big Bob" Belcher Sr. and Lily Belcher, husband of Linda, and father of Tina, Gene, and Louise. He is a third-generation restaurateur and currently the proprietor of his eponymous burger restaurant. He is currently 46 years old. It has been mentioned that Bob's mother Lily died prior to the series' beginning. His childhood has been self-described as "crappy", as his father discouraged play. However, he has implied he loved spending time with his mother, as she would take him on long walks. Bob's mother went unnamed until the Belchers went to visit her gravesite.

Bob tends to entertain himself by having conversations with inanimate objects, mainly food, and then speaking back as the inanimate object, usually using a high falsetto voice. He also enjoys making puns, using this talent to name his burger specials. While poor with business management and cursed with an unlucky streak, his skills at cooking are excellent; he has even been referred to as a "beef artist" by Mr. Fischoeder. His primary business rival is Jimmy Pesto, who owns an Italian restaurant across the street from Bob's Burgers.

The Burger of the Day special stems from an incident in which he customized a burger by adding chives and sour cream to it, calling it a "Baby You Can Chive My Car Burger". He tried to serve it to one of Big Bob's regular customers who normally ordered a tuna melt, but Big Bob threw the burger away in front of the whole diner. 10 years later, still resentful over not being allowed to cook the way he wanted, Bob turned down Big Bob's offer of a partnership in the diner and opened his own restaurant.

Bob prides himself on giving the customer a quality meal and goes the extra mile to ensure it by choosing fresh ingredients he gets from the local farmers' markets and co-ops. His biggest accomplishment is the "Meatsiah", a concoction consisting of a steak tartare center with a medium-well cooked burger surrounding it and a beef Wellington surrounding the burger. Bob is allergic to shellfish, particularly lobster, as it causes his face to swell any time he eats it. This is a problem, as the seaside town where the Belchers live has an annual lobster festival he hates since it takes away from his business. Bob, along with Linda, enjoys drinking, and many of the episode gags involve Bob or Linda getting drunk, usually from wine.

Bob is a tall, paunchy, and swarthy chef. He has male pattern baldness and a bushy mustache, olive skin, and feathered bangs swooping down on his forehead. He wears a pale gray, short-sleeved T-shirt usually donned with a white apron with a breast pocket, dark gray chef's pants, and black kitchen clogs with white socks shown on the top near where his pants end.

=== Linda Belcher ===
Linda Belcher (née Genarro) (voiced by John Roberts) is the happy-go-lucky wife of Bob and mother of Tina, Gene, and Louise. Before her marriage to Bob, she was engaged to Hugo, who is now a local health inspector. She is currently 44 years old. She has referred to herself as a "pre-middle-aged mother". In early seasons, Linda wears her everyday outfit top with a button-up, while in newer seasons it is a V-neck instead.

Linda's attraction to Bob, whom she often refers to as "Bobby", is in part due to his passion for his work, and also due to his mustache. Linda remains a loyal and devoted wife despite their frequent financial problems, and never having had a honeymoon or a day off in 10 years. She has a preference for mustaches, and says Bob "made himself ugly" when he shaved it off. Her passions include singing, dinner theater, porcelain baby figurines, Tom Selleck, nautically themed romance novels, and prenatal yoga. She handles the accounting for the restaurant, though her bookkeeping methods are overly complicated. She is fond of alcohol and is known to say "Mommy doesn't get drunk, she just has fun."

Linda is extroverted, has a thick New Jersey accent, and is fond of tackling problems using unconventional methods, though her methods are frequently overly optimistic and things sometimes go awry. She often encourages her kids to engage in behavior Bob finds annoying, and though she wants what's best for her kids, she tends to be scatterbrained. Bob has described her as a pushover because she allows people, especially their kids, to take advantage of her. She has a contentious relationship with Louise and often misunderstands her, even once organizing a slumber party for Louise against her will. She is a talented lyricist and tends to spontaneously burst into song, a trait she shares with her voice actor, John Roberts. Many of the songs she is known for are improvised by Roberts. They are frequently remade and set to music for the end credits of many episodes.

Linda's maiden name is Genarro, and she is of Italian descent. She has a friend who's only mentioned but never seen or heard named Ginger.

=== Tina Belcher ===
Tina Ruth Belcher (voiced by Dan Mintz) is the eldest Belcher child. She is currently 13 years old. She generally speaks in a masculine tone, wears glasses, works part-time at the family restaurant, and is often the voice of reason among the Belcher children. However, it is made quite clear that Tina's own characteristics rival those of her siblings. She is trying to come to grips with her entry into adulthood and claims to have a complicated relationship with zombies. She typically wears a sky blue, short-sleeved T-shirt, a short, navy blue pencil skirt, white tube socks with red stripes on the bottom, black sneakers with white tips, and a yellow barrette on the right side of her head, which she typically dons with her thick glasses to help her see better. Like the rest of her family, she has black hair and olive skin. She also wears her hair in a bob cut with loose curls at the ends.

Despite seeming reticent and shy around her peers, Tina has an active social and romantic life. She has an on-again, off-again relationship with Jimmy Jr., and has dated, kissed, or flirted with several other boys. She is obsessed with horses, boys, and buttocks; in various episodes, she writes in her journal about touching people's butts, which, to her, is the height of sexual contact. According to her siblings, Tina has written erotic fanfiction of several television shows and movies and has moved on to "erotic friend fiction", in which she uses real people. She is a member of the Hormone-iums, a musical revue at Wagstaff that sings songs about puberty, and was formerly a member of the Thundergirls, a Girl Scout-like organization. She is generally soft-spoken and reserved, often in contrast to her more strident siblings.

In the show's early developmental stages, the eldest Belcher child was originally written as a boy, named Daniel Belcher, who was also voiced by Mintz, whose personality is said to have been similar to that of Tina's. She is also shown to have difficulties with her schoolwork despite working hard at it, as seen when she is put into remedial math and when guidance counselor Mr. Frond refers to her as a "dum-dum".

=== Gene Belcher ===
Robert Eugene “Gene” Belcher III (voiced by Eugene Mirman) is the middle child and only male in the family besides Bob. He is revealed to be 11 years old. Like Linda, he has an upbeat and enthusiastic attitude about almost everything. However, he closely resembles Bob and has inherited his lobster allergy. He often promotes the restaurant by wearing a burger costume and using a toy megaphone to hand out samples.

Gene has a variety of interests and hobbies, with his most well-known being food and music. Though he has no training, he occasionally demonstrates great skill in music and aspires to be a musician. He enjoys playing a Casio-type keyboard and using it to make fart sounds. In the past, he has created an elaborate love duet as well as a one-man show. Despite this, Gene is not without his flaws, namely a tendency to be easily distracted, which his family refers to as "Gene-ing out", but he is loving and loyal toward his family. He is also shown to be unathletic and run away from fights in fear. It is shown he suffers from a fear of snakes.

Gene has an occasional tendency towards making unintentionally sexual double entendres, which his father Bob corrects or tells him not to repeat, often admonishing him by simply saying his name. He is also fond of making wisecracks and pop culture references. Like his father and mother, he has olive skin and dark black hair. He has his hair in a short bowl cut with long flips at each side of his head. He sports a pale yellow short-sleeved T-shirt, a pair of slightly lengthy, light blue denim shorts, short white socks, and, like his older sister, white and red sneakers.

=== Louise Belcher ===
Louise Belcher (voiced by Kristen Schaal) is the youngest child of the Belcher family and is revealed to be 9 years old. She typically wears a short-sleeved, olive-green dress slightly below the knees, black Mary-Jane flats, and a hot pink beanie hat with rabbit ears on top of it. Like the rest of her family, she has black hair and olive skin. Her black hair peeks out from her large hat, slightly exposing the hair-ties holding up her pigtails; her yellow hair-ties in the front covered up by the long ends of her bunny hat, along with the aglets of her hat. Like her mother and older sister, her hair has curls at the ends.

Despite being the youngest, she usually dominates her two older siblings by wearing down their self-esteem. Precociously intelligent, manipulative, and aggressive with both children and adults, she is more than willing to exploit people if there is anything to be gained, and has a history of gaslighting her siblings, especially Tina.

She has an offbeat and dark sense of humor, and picks locks as a hobby. She tends to be very loud, and often shouts at the top of her lungs to get her points across. Louise always wears her signature hat, regardless of the situation. To date, viewers have never seen her uncovered head. When a teenager stole her hat from her, her head was off-screen, and she wore a hoodie until she got it back.

She believed her hat made her brave and got it in order to be able to face preschool. However, this turned out to be untrue, as she got it after her first day of preschool when Linda made it in honor of Bob's mother Lily, who often wore a similar beanie, though Louise's hat had bunny ears added due to Linda having extra fabric. Louise is not immune to breaking her tough character persona, however. She called Bob "daddy" until she was eight, felt guilty about almost electrocuting her sister, still believes in Santa Claus, has a disturbing crush on a boy band member, becomes enamored with puppies, and proclaims she does love her family, albeit in the face of death. Since she was a baby, Louise has always liked Bob more than Linda, opting to spend more time with him as she finds him much more interesting. It can be assumed Louise and Bob have a very strong relationship, although she is the most prone amongst her siblings to mock him. On one occasion, Louise accidentally revealed her plan to take over the family restaurant when Bob retires, after renaming it "Louise's Burgers".

=== Relatives of the Belcher family ===
- Gayle Genarro (voiced by Megan Mullally) – Linda's neurotic artist younger sister, the aunt of Tina, Gene and Louise and sister-in-law of Bob. Bob dislikes her, much to Linda's consternation. She is desperately lonely and once fell in love with Bob because, as Linda explains, she always wants what Linda has. However, men often take an interest in her, including Dr. Yap, Mort, Mr. Frond, and Mr. Fischoeder. She loves cats and, since she often fakes injuries, may suffer from some form of factitious disorder. She also can't keep any real job for longer than a few days, and it has been implied that Linda sends her money so she won't end up homeless.
- Gloria Genarro (née Rinaldi) (voiced by Renée Taylor) – Linda's mother, mother-in-law of Bob, and maternal grandmother of Tina, Gene, and Louise. Bob doesn't like her very much, and he always tries to hide from her when she and Al come over to visit. She convinces her husband to move to a retirement community of swingers. Her recent appearances validate Bob's view of her as she is shown to be constantly demanding, thankless, and immature. The Belchers have made a point of only seeing her and Al once a year and once turned a brief airport layover near their house into that visit so they could extend the time they would not have to spend around her by nearly two years due to the flight's timing.
- Al Genarro (voiced by Sam Seder) – Linda's father, father-in-law of Bob, and maternal grandfather of Tina, Gene, and Louise. He rarely speaks, is hard of hearing, hence his hearing aid. He accompanies Gloria everywhere. He has a fetish for women inflating balloons and then sitting on them until they pop. He's better than his wife by default, but never confronts her behavior.
- Robert "Big Bob" Eugene Belcher Sr. (voiced by H. Jon Benjamin in 2012, Bill Hader in 2014, Eric Bauza from 2022 to TBA) – Bob's widowed father, father-in-law of Linda, and paternal grandfather of Tina, Gene, and Louise. Like his son, Big Bob is a restaurateur who owns his own business called "Big Bob's Diner". He was shown to be an emotionally unavailable father towards his own son via flashbacks, but they have improved their relationship since then, and the Belcher kids love him and vice versa, a total contrast to how they don't like Linda's parents and only tolerate them in very limited and forced doses. Since his son's preteen years, Big Bob has been very controlling of Bob and put him to work most of the time. He enjoys line-dancing, which he practices at the bar next to his diner. He found life to be difficult after the death of Lily. In conversations with his son, he revealed he proposed to Lily after a tree almost fell on them while they were camping.
- Lily Belcher – Bob's deceased mother, mother-in-law of Linda, paternal grandmother of Tina, Gene, and Louise. Most information about her comes from flashbacks and memories. She and Big Bob once went camping, and a tree almost fell on them, causing him to know he wanted to marry her. She and Bob would make gingerbread houses together, a fond memory Bob has of her. Big Bob also found life and running the restaurant to be difficult following her death. When she appears fully for the first time, she is depicted wearing her favorite pink beanie. Bob tells Louise her own signature hat reminds him of Lily.

== Recurring characters ==
=== Regular customers at Bob's Burgers ===
- Theodore "Teddy" (voiced by Larry Murphy) – A talkative, kind-hearted, burly, and socially awkward handyman who is a loyal and near-daily customer of Bob's Burgers. Teddy is extremely fond of the Belchers and wants to be a part of the family. However, due to their family restaurant's name, he thinks the Belchers' last name is Burger. Teddy stays behind in the restaurant to repair the ceiling while the family goes on a road trip with Nat Kinkle. He then fantasizes Linda leaving Bob for him and them adopting Bob as their son. Teddy considers Bob to be his best friend. While Bob generally likes and respects Teddy, he also finds him to be deeply annoying much of the time. In his youth, Teddy was attractive, had long blonde hair, and was physically fit. He was attractive enough to be cast as a lifeguard in The Deepening, a 1980s exploitation movie, filmed at Wonder Wharf. However, due to an incident during filming taking such a toll on him, he resorted to overeating and gained a substantial amount of weight. Teddy is divorced, lives alone, and dates infrequently. Before he was a contractor, he served in the United States Navy and was stationed in Guam. He was once married to a woman named Denise who cheated on him regularly. Denise was highly critical of Teddy and once told him his head looks like a butt. This is why he always wears a beanie. Their marriage ended when Denise left Teddy for a boating enthusiast who owns a waterside bar where she works as a waitress called the Schoon Hound. Teddy reluctantly confesses to the Belchers that he is a hoarder due to childhood trauma and develops intense body odor when he becomes anxious, which he calls “panic stink”. Long-winded at times, Teddy frequently tells excessively detailed stories about mundane situations that usually bore the listener. While he is known to eat nearly anything offered to him, Bob's hamburgers seem to be among his favorite foods. Teddy learns that his daily consumption of burgers and fries has caused him to develop extremely high cholesterol. Generally mild-mannered and affable, Teddy participates in ongoing therapy sessions as he sometimes has angry, violent outbursts over minor incidents, which he instantly regrets, often causing him to burst into tears and apologize.
- Mortimer "Mort" (voiced by Andy Kindler) – A mortician and the owner of the "It's Your Funeral" funeral home next to the restaurant and also a regular customer of Bob's Burgers. He is a little odd and has a stereotypically morbid sense of humor. Mort is single, wears an obvious toupee, and lives in a stylishly decorated apartment above his funeral home. He is good friends with Bob and Teddy and has cared for the Belcher children on occasion. He also acted as the Belcher family driver when Tina crashed Bob's car. Mort has a generally good sense of humor about the macabre questions to which he is often subjected regarding his job. His name is Latin for "dead" or "death", a playful nod to the fact he works in a funeral home. He hires a Borat impersonator for his mother's 86th birthday party to help catch a man who lied to multiple restaurants about hair in his food. He is hinted to be Jewish, as he was headed off to enjoy Chinese food on Christmas Eve with his mom and lent the Belchers his business hearse to go see a nearby lights display.

=== Pesto family ===
- Jimmy Pesto Sr. (voiced by Jay Johnston from 2011 to 2021, Eric Bauza from 2023 to TBA) – Real surname Poplopovich, is the owner of an Italian-themed restaurant called Jimmy Pesto's Pizzeria. Although of Eastern European descent, he goes by the Italian-sounding name of Pesto, presumably to increase the appeal of his restaurant. He and his family members are invariably referred to by the Pesto last name. He is Bob's archenemy and Jimmy Jr., Andy, and Ollie's father. Their feud often seems to border on stalking each other and occasionally descends into violence. Their families get along well, and, apart from a few isolated incidents, neither of their businesses endangers the other. This is partly because Bob's menu is genuinely better than Jimmy's, which is often described as subpar. Jimmy once competed in a burger cook-off against Bob and a celebrity chef, and his "Oregano Burger" was poorly received. He is divorced from his children's mother, who has not yet been seen, and Jimmy moved into a pathetic bachelor-type apartment after the divorce was finalized. It has been strongly implied he has no real friends. On one occasion, Trev, the pizzeria's bartender, enlisted Bob to bring him pain medication since he couldn't think of anyone who likes Jimmy and knows, even though he rightfully loathes Jimmy, he is a good person who will help someone when they're injured. He has dark brown hair worn in a pompadour style.
- Jimmy Pesto Jr. (voiced by H. Jon Benjamin) – Almost always referred to as "Jimmy Jr.", he is the oldest son of Jimmy Pesto. Jimmy works as the busboy at his father's restaurant. He is Tina's classmate, love interest, and on-again, off-again boyfriend. Tina has a crush on him and tries her best to get his attention. He is close friends with Zeke, who calls him "J. Ju", has a lateral lisp, and loves dancing. He appears to be among the most popular students at Wagstaff Middle School, though many students turned against him after Louise bungled his student body president campaign. Jimmy Jr. is also prone to envy. This is especially seen when he resents Gene for becoming friends with Zeke and begins to feud with Tina's love interest, Josh, despite their on-and-off relationship. Jimmy Jr. has gone on dates with Tina. However, he forgets this from time to time. Louise calls him "brace face", implying he wears braces, but these are never seen, aside from in his fifth-grade school picture. He has dirty blond hair, light skin, and a tall stature. Jimmy Jr. typically wears a pale yellow, short-sleeved shirt; a blue, open vest over his shirt, black-gray sweatpants, and short white sneakers. He has his father's pompadour hairstyle.
- Andy and Ollie Pesto (voiced by Sarah Silverman and Laura Silverman) – Jimmy Pesto Sr.'s blond twin sons who are Jimmy Pesto Jr.'s younger brothers. They are very childish and care for each other a lot, experiencing extreme anxiety whenever they must be separated. At one point, they imply that their backpacks will miss each other when separated and are nearly run over because they were trying to simultaneously carry each other across the street. They are classmates and good friends with Louise despite the rivalry between their fathers and Louise's tendency to take advantage of them. Ollie and Andy's intense fondness for each other mimics that of Walter and Perry from Loren Bouchard's previous animated television series Home Movies. The difference between them is that Andy wears a light blue shirt and Ollie wears a neon green shirt.

=== Wagstaff School ===
==== Wagstaff School staff ====
- Mr. Frond (voiced by David Herman) – Phillip J. Frond is the "self-certified" school counselor of Wagstaff School. He feels underused and underappreciated at the school. This is largely because nobody really likes him, due to his uptight and strict personality. Therefore, his advice is never sought after. He occasionally concocts harebrained schemes to advance his own career, which usually backfire spectacularly. Mr. Frond is a vegetarian. However, it's been mentioned he made a meat dish for his date and has a small tongue. He also knits religiously, talks to his mother on the phone every day, and has multiple cats.
- Coach Blevins (voiced by Larry Murphy) – The school's gym teacher and wrestling team's coach who wears shatterproof goggles. He is also the fourth-grade science teacher, where he teaches the class how to make a battery out of a penny and a potato and has them dissect bananas. He usually settles gym class disputes by having the students wrestle. He takes salsa dancing classes and briefly had his driver's license suspended, forcing him to go to traffic school.
- Principal Spoors − The principal at Wagstaff. His face has never been shown, and he's made only one physical appearance on the show. He does nothing except make deals benefiting himself and his family and leaves all hard choices and their consequences to be made and faced by Mr. Frond.
- Mr. Ambrose (voiced by Billy Eichner) – The sarcastic and apathetic school librarian and cheerleading coach who has a penchant for dramatism, sometimes coming to verbal blows with Mr. Frond. He also practices witchcraft. He is writing a prequel to Mrs. Doubtfire called Mrs. Doubtwater.
- Mr. Branca (voiced by David Herman) – An immigrant janitor from an unknown country. According to himself, he was his country's president before a coup d'état occurred. He is talented at ribbon dancing, and, despite wearing the same custodian uniform everywhere, has a keen sense for fashion. He considers Tina to be his best friend, frequently gossiping with her about the other students.
- Mr. Desanto (voiced by Nick Kroll) - The school's debate coach and photography teacher. He used to be a private investigator.
- Mr. Grant (voiced by Will Forte) – An A/V teacher who runs the school news program. He is known for his five "W's of News". He encouraged Gene and Courtney to read the morning announcements to motivate the student body in the morning, since Ms. LaBonz puts them to sleep with her announcements.
- Ms. Jacobson (voiced by Melissa Bardin Galsky from 2012 to 2021, Ashley Nicole Black since 2021) – An eighth-grade teacher who is usually seen teaching Tina's class, which often includes Jimmy Jr., Jocelyn, Tammy, and Zeke. She is usually mild-mannered and is described by Bob as "ridiculously attractive".
- Ms. LaBonz (voiced by H. Jon Benjamin) – A fourth-grade teacher who usually teaches Louise's class, which also includes Andy and Ollie Pesto, Millie Frock, Hogarth Haber, Harley, Jeremy, Rudy, Chloe Barbash, and Wayne. She has a habit of stealing supplies from the school. She is a heavy smoker and plays a game on her smartphone called Dippin' Chips. For all of her grumpiness, she is shown to be a good teacher who cares for her students. Louise is surprised to learn Miss LaBonz grades her work toughly because she knows she's a very smart yet lazy and stubborn kid. After Louise indirectly gives her a great evaluation review, LaBonz gets a coveted parking spot right in front of the school.
- Ms. Merkin (voiced by Brian Huskey) – Matilda Merkin is the longtime music teacher at Wagstaff. She is a very proficient musician, competent at multiple instruments including drums, ukulele, piano, and guitar. She is supportive of Gene's talent, defecting to his guerrilla Die Hard musical after being replaced in the school musical. Gene enlisted her to help him improve his musicianship, but he gives up 45 seconds later because of the commitment required. She has a sister named Sheila who is a stage actress.
- Ms. Selbo (voiced by Sarah Baker) – The school receptionist. She gossips about the students constantly. She frequents the teacher's lounge after school and pretends she is a teacher, using Ms. Jacobson's mug. She has psychopathic tendencies, stalking her ex-boyfriend Martin for a year after their breakup, sleeping outside his house, urinating on his mail, and stealing his dog.
- Ms. Schnur (voiced by Sarah Silverman) – The secretary to Principal Spoors who is usually distracted by kids who are sent to him. She has a pet cat, is a fan of Penny Marshall, David Schwimmer, and Brendan Fraser, and is devoted to her nephew Nathan.
- Ms. Twitchell (voiced by Tymberlee Hill) – Ms. Twitchell is a sixth-grade teacher. She is divorced.

==== Wagstaff School students ====
- Alex Papasian (voiced by Thomas Middleditch from 2018 to 2019, Paul Rust since 2020) – A Wagstaff School student and one of Gene's best friends. The pair bonded over their mutual dislike of gym class, resulting in Alex inviting Gene to his first sleepover, during which he attempts to run away from his parents. More of his relationship with Gene has since been established, including the fact that they like to play "RoboWizard Quest" in the basement of Bob's Burgers. Alex is extremely sensitive to sesame.
- Chloe Barbash (voiced by Stephanie Beatriz) – A student in Coach Blevins' science class with Louise. It is revealed Rudy has an unrequited crush on her. She uses a very fragrant and pleasingly aromatic shampoo.
- Choo-Choo (voiced by Brian Posehn) – Choo-Choo is a student at Wagstaff School and Gene's enemy. He constantly annoys Gene whenever he tells a joke by saying the punchline before him. He got his name due to saying "choo choo" whenever getting into a fight.
- Courtney Wheeler (voiced by David Wain) – Gene's first girlfriend. She is an annoying girl who likes Gene. He begins going out with her when he is stuck with answering if he "like-likes" her, so he pairs up with her temporarily. She has long, wavy-curly platinum blond hair in two thick pigtails and olive skin. Courtney usually wears a lavender purple tank top, a short, violet skirt, light purple flat shoes, and a gold necklace whose heart-shaped pendant she likes to put in her mouth. Gene's plan to break up with her was interrupted when he met her father, Doug, whom he believed could launch his career by writing jingles. He breaks up with her at her birthday party after she interrupts one of his performances. She once upstaged him by staging a musical based on the film Working Girl. They later reconciled and kindled a brief romance, but Courtney broke up with Gene to preserve the quality of their school news program.
- Darryl (voiced by Aziz Ansari) – A student at Wagstaff School who likes video and arcade games, comic books, robots, and going to the science museum. He is possibly of Indian American descent and is a gifted math student, tutoring many of the Wagstaff students who are remedial. He once teamed up with the Belchers in their attempt to sell tickets to view a nude beach. A talented musician, he is passionate about singing and uses a looper pedal when he creates music. Darryl has arachnophobia, claustrophobia, and eczema. He can't whistle and cries during the movie Frozen.
- Harley (voiced by Katie Crown from 2014 to 2021, Ashley Nicole Black since 2021) – Harley is a garrulous classmate of Louise and Rudy. Extroverted and indefatigable, she is usually positive but can quickly become disheartened or frightened. She collects stickers, is in the Thundergirls, has a wallet made of duct tape, and cares for a cat named Popover.
- Henry Haber (voiced by Jim Gaffigan) – A student at Wagstaff School. When he first appears, he is assigned as Tina's buddy for the museum field trip. Henry runs for student body president under the campaign "Chess We Can". He later wins by default after Millie and Louise both get disqualified. He is on the debate team and briefly dates Tina. Henry has a younger brother, Hogarth, who is in Louise's class. He is mutually attracted to classmate Susmita.
- Jeremy (voiced by H. Jon Benjamin) – One of Louise's classmates. He was first characterized as uptight, ratting on Louise's science project to Mr. Frond. However, as evidenced by him being willing to engage in a bounce house theft, he's loosened up a little. His favorite film is War Horse.
- Jocelyn (voiced by John Roberts) – A student at Wagstaff School and Tammy's best friend and sidekick. She is a cheerleader. She has displayed an obsession with being cool and popular to the point of being unable to have a mind of her own. However, it seemingly stems from a desire to avoid embarrassing herself
- Jodi (voiced by Rachel Dratch) – A student at Wagstaff School who has a severe fear of germs. It is extreme enough that she struggles to sit down or touch anything without using hand sanitizer or wearing rubber gloves. She is in the Thundergirls. She has trouble with math and tries out for the girls' field hockey team.
- Large Tommy (voiced by H. Jon Benjamin) – An overweight student who has brown hair and wears a red shirt and glasses. Like Speedo Guy, he appears randomly in the series, mainly in background roles. He is the slowest runner at Wagstaff.
- Lenny DeStefano (voiced by Larry Murphy) – A student in the same sixth-grade class as Gene. Lenny is an extremely popular and handsome boy, considered the biggest catch at Wagstaff among the girls of all grades. His charm apparently extends to adults, as Bob seemed very taken with Lenny during a short car ride together and Ms. Merkin even expressed interest in attending his birthday party. When Jimmy Jr. asked Tina if she was seeing Lenny, he mentioned his good looks. This came after she confessed to another boy asking her to his school dance, who ended up being Josh.
- Mabel "Abby" Haddington (voiced by Rachel Dratch) – A student who attends Wagstaff School. She is obsessed with braiding.
- Millie Frock (voiced by Molly Shannon) – A student in the fourth grade who is obsessed with Louise. She displays psychopathic tendencies. She traps the Belcher children and their friends in a fort overnight as retaliation for Louise refusing to be her friend. She ran for school president with the intent of using her presidential power to force Louise into becoming her best friend. The two of them later make peace.
- Peter Pescadero (voiced by H. Jon Benjamin) – A wimpy boy who is one of Gene's classmates. He is a terrible dancer and owns a Sasquatch mask that became Gene's. He has partial hearing loss and is also an award-winning magician. Louise alleges he has a learning disorder. Peter plays the recorder and takes home economics with Tina, Jocelyn, Jimmy Jr., and Zeke.
- Rudolph "Rudy" Stieblitz (voiced by Brian Huskey) – Known as "Regular-Sized Rudy" to distinguish him from a smaller classmate known as "Pocket-Sized Rudy". He is Louise's classmate and friend. He has asthma and needs to use his inhaler every two hours is also allergic to chocolate. Despite his condition, he loves to have fun and often joins Louise in her mischievous escapades. He keeps cymbals in his backpack and is passionate about autumn foliage. He is a frequent guest of a wine tasting train where he spends his time on a bean bag chair while his father goes on internet dates. Beyond his friendship with Louise, he has good relationships with all of the Belchers. He admires Tina and looks up to her as an older role model, who, along with Gene, Bob, and Linda, like Rudy and make sure to help him when he faces emotionally difficult situations. He was the undefeated school "ga-ga ball" champion until Gene defeated him.
- Susmita (voiced by Aparna Nancherla) – One of Tina's smartest classmates. She has a kind heart and is extremely generous, and is established to be friends with her outside of school. She is paired with Tina on a science project where they use a satellite dish to try to make contact with extraterrestrials. She also helps her avoid getting a D in their photography class.
- Tammy Larsen (voiced by Jenny Slate) – Tina's frenemy. She was a brunette in her first appearance. In subsequent episodes, however, her hair is dyed blond. Andy and Ollie once described her as a "bathroom clown" due to her makeup. Tammy comes from a Jewish family and is at least 12 years old, as she has "celebrated" her bat mitzvah. Tina wound up taking her place at the party, much to the relief of everyone, including Tammy's own relatives. She is also Wagstaff's head cheerleader and has a problem with passing gas, caused by laughing too hard, someone lifting her wrong, or because of nerves. The only time she can't pass gas is when she actually wants to.
- Wayne (voiced by Andy Richter) – One of Louise's classmates. He babysits the class pet chinchilla every weekend. He is fairly decent at "ga-ga ball", but does not actually enjoy playing it in particular.
- Zeke (voiced by Bobby Tisdale) – An immature yet kind-hearted and fun boy who Jimmy Jr. is best friends with. He gets along with everyone he meets and makes friends quickly, in contrast to most of the series' other child characters, but is shy around girls and admits he's never been on a date. Zeke's middle name is Anthony, but his last name is unknown. He's obsessed with wrestling and breasts and makes fart jokes often. He might be a gifted chef, as suspected by Bob. Zeke's mother was pregnant with him when she went to prom. His biological parents divorced when he was a toddler. Zeke's blended family moved frequently. His stepmother is named Cheryl, and his older male cousin is named Leslie. He is close with his grandmother, who lives in the Elegant Doily Retirement Home, and met his deceased grandfather when they were mascots in college. Zeke has a brother who is 44. He is heavily implied in some episodes to have a crush on Tina.

=== Other children ===
- Jonas (voiced by Paul Rust) – The delivery boy at Reggie's Deli. He drives a moped and plays the melodica. Tina briefly finds him attractive, or more specifically, his long, blond hair. Jonas uses this knowledge to manipulate her into opening Bob's Burgers late at night while her parents are out of town so he and his friends can hang out and eat free burgers. He is smitten with a girl named Vanessa and tries to give her Louise's fourth-grade class's pet chinchilla as a gift.
- Logan Bush (voiced by Kurt Braunohler) – Louise's nemesis and Cynthia's son. He first appeared as a bully to the Belcher kids, eventually stealing Louise's hat. He manages to keep it from her until Louise gets the One-Eyed Snakes to retrieve it. He later reappears attending the mother-daughter seminar where he is called a "male daughter". His full name was chosen to be a play on words based on a loganberry bush. Cynthia, his mother, admits she and his father "didn't think it through". Bob once employed Logan as an unpaid intern in exchange for a plot in the community garden, which is run by Cynthia, and dismisses Louise's anger over working alongside Logan because he values the plants he comes to call his "babies". When Logan and his awful mom push Louise to her breaking point, and she threatens Bob's plants to force him to deal with the situation, Bob realizes how selfish he's been, apologizes to Louise, and accepts being ejected from the garden when he fires Logan from his internship.
- Bryce (voiced by Joe Lo Truglio) – A teenage resident of King's Head Island who participates in the annual Hell Hunt on Halloween night. He later reappears as an expert in go-kart racing. Bryce finished third in the King's Head Island Grand Prix.
- Sasha Whiteman (voiced by Jon Daly) – A resident of King's Head Island who goes go-kart racing against Bryce. Sasha is also the top debater for his school's team. He once helped Louise, Gene, Tina, and Rudy steal his cousin Dahlia's bounce house.
- Duncan (voiced by Rhys Darby) - A classmate of Sasha's on King's Head Island, originally from New Zealand. He is friendly and naive, and he usually gets roped into Sasha's schemes.

=== Belcher Family friends ===
- Josh (voiced by Ben Schwartz) – A boy Tina met while in the milk fridge of a supermarket. Both he and Jimmy Pesto Jr. attempted to win over her heart and take her to the dance. He goes to a school for the performing arts and is a ballet dancer. Tina attempts to let him know she'd rather just be friends, only for a stage accident during his tap dance dress rehearsal to lead Tina to label the accident as a possible sabotage, which she hopes will help her let him down easy.
- Gretchen (voiced by Larry Murphy) – A busty blond woman with a deep, nasal voice. She is a hairstylist. Linda remains one of her most loyal customers despite Gretchen's subpar stylist abilities and tendency to cut her ear at least once during every appointment. She sells vibrators on the side. She gets a job working at an American Girl-style store and helps Louise steal a doll she likes. Gretchen briefly dates Hugo.
- Marshmallow (voiced by David Herman from 2011 to 2021, Jari Jones since 2023) – A transgender African American prostitute. She is often seen in a white monokini. She is skilled at being able to crack anyone's back. A running gag is, after finding himself in the middle of some sort of chaotic or farcical situation, Bob saying her name following a subdued, pleasantly surprised greeting.
- Mickey (voiced by Bill Hader from 2012 to 2020, Loren Bouchard in 2021, John Q. Kubin since 2022) – A former bank robber who took a shine to the Belcher family. In contrast to stereotypes of criminals, he has an amiable demeanor. Mickey briefly works at Bob's Burgers. He later gets a job as a ride operator at Wonder Wharf. Mickey also has a side hustle as a pedicab driver.
- Nat Kinkle (voiced by Jillian Bell) - A well-connected limo driver who helps the Belchers cheer up a heartbroken Tina upon meeting them. She drives a pink limousine with a distinctive musical car horn and wears a matching pink suit. She also helps the kids and Bob look for a missing ring and takes the whole Belcher family on a road trip to visit her ex-girlfriend.
- One-Eyed Snakes – An outlaw motorcycle club whose members are good friends with the Belcher Family. The One-Eyed Snakes were founded by Horny Dave and led by him until his death, when his motorcycle collided with a truck. There are a total of 18 members in the club.
  - Critter (voiced by Robert Ben Garant) – The One-Eyed Snakes' leader following the death of Horny Dave. Afterwards, he's seen as a friend of the Belchers, helping the kids build a go-kart from stolen motorcycle parts, sitting with Bob and Linda at the subsequent races, and calling on Bob for help with getting out of jail. Bob bails him out after he is arrested for having $9,000 worth of unpaid parking tickets by selling his motorcycle to an investment banker, in order to get him to his first day of work at What the Tech before his afternoon shift starts.
  - Mudflap (voiced by Wendi McLendon-Covey) – A female member of the One Eyed Snakes and Critter's wife. She gives birth to their son Sidecar in a booth in the restaurant. She throws a baby shower for her friend and fellow biker Goldie, who also delivers her baby in the restaurant.
  - Rat Daddy (voiced by Kyle Kinane) - A bearded member of the One-Eyed Snakes.
  - Ice Pick (voiced by Larry Murphy) - A member of the One-Eyed Snakes who sports a moustache, a goatee, and a mohawk.
  - Scab (voiced by Joe Lo Truglio) - A member of the One-Eyed Snakes who has a goatee and is bald.

=== Health inspectors ===
- Hugo Habercore (voiced by Sam Seder) – A health inspector who used to be engaged to Linda but was jilted by her for Bob, a fact that causes him no end of frustration. This fact alone causes him to target Bob any chance he gets, to the point of malpractice, blackmail, and sabotage. He briefly becomes a nudist and ropes the Belchers into his unauthorized sting of a meat vendor who sells horse meat.
- Ron (voiced by Ron Lynch) – Hugo's assistant, a trainee health inspector. Often quiet, he is willing to point out Hugo's malpractices when they go too far, and unlike Hugo, he's friendly towards the Belchers. He takes a pedicab to the library on a weekly basis, and he volunteers at the local marionette theater.

=== Parents ===
- Colleen Caviello (voiced by Jaime Moyer) - Linda's rival on the PTA. Linda is obsessed with outdoing Colleen in that year's charity pasta dinner. Linda steals the right to lead that year's bake sale from Colleen. Colleen also runs against Linda for PTA treasurer, but Joanne, the PTA president, convinces everyone to vote for Linda. Joanne goes on to manipulate Linda, and, by extension, the PTA funds. Linda solicits Colleen's help due to her accounting experience in uncovering Joanne's ongoing fraud. It is not revealed who Colleen's child is.
- Cynthia Bush (voiced by Lindsey Stoddart) - The mother of Logan Bush. She has as contentious a relationship with Linda as Logan does with Louise. Manages the community garden.
- Doug Wheeler (voiced by John Michael Higgins) - The father of Courtney. He writes jingles for a living. Doug composes Courtney's school musical based on the movie Working Girl. He is obsessed with dancing while wearing rollerblades and forces his daughter into it to make up for his own shortcomings as a roller dancer in the 1980s. He is equally protective of his daughter and cat, Susan.
- Sylvester Stieblitz (voiced by Brian Huskey) - Rudy's father. He and Rudy's mother are divorced. Sylvester's life is often hapless, with failed attempts at dating and him often failing to succeed in his other ventures, such as planning Rudy's birthday. However, Sylvester is mature about his changed life situation. He refuses to treat his ex-wife's boyfriend, Paul, as competition and assuages Rudy's distress over the changes to their family.

=== Business owners ===
- Calvin Fischoeder (voiced by Kevin Kline) – Mr. Fischoeder is an odd local landlord and businessman who dresses in a white suit, a white cape, and a white eyepatch over his left eye, and who has a hairstyle similar to Vanity Fair publisher Graydon Carter. He owns or has a stake in just about every property in town, including Wonder Wharf, the Belcher and Pesto restaurants, Family Fun Time, Reggie's Deli, Capoeira Center for Capoeira, Reflections, and It's Your Funeral. He drives around town in a golf cart and throws firecrackers at people. He likes Bob despite Bob always being late with his rent. This is partially because Bob knows a legendary burger recipe he greatly enjoys, and Bob reminds him of his father due to his hairy arms. Louise describes him as being "one white cat away from being a supervillain". He smokes marijuana. It is revealed that his brother Felix is the reason why he wears an eyepatch. Mr. Fischoeder claims to have "lost the year 1996 to Schnapps" and has a gambling addiction, betting on everything from the kids' underground casino to whether Bob or Jimmy would win in a fight.
- Edith and Harold Cranwinkle (voiced by Larry Murphy and Sam Seder) – The elderly owners of Reflections, an art sale, supplies, and lessons store. Edith is the chairperson of the Art Crawl, an event where local businesses display artwork. She frequently antagonizes Bob and enjoys making him pay huge markups when he desperately needs supplies in time-critical situations, but she and Bob were able to get along better after Bob found out she was looked after by Wonder Wharf's circus freaks as a young girl while her parents worked on Wonder Wharf. Harold has acrophobia and once had a mild stroke. Edith is the dominant partner in both their business and marital relationship, which explains why Harold has reduced his nasty and insulting treatment of Bob since Edith warmed up a little bit to the restaurateur.
- Felix Fischoeder (voiced by Zach Galifianakis) – The younger brother of Calvin Fischoeder. Felix is known to be rather neurotic and has emotional issues stemming from his childhood. He is the cause of Calvin's poked-out eye. To calm him down, they had to sing a tribute song to Felix, revealing he is a narcissist. When he first appeared, he decided to install a new, high-tech bathroom in the restaurant. He and Bob once conspired to convince Calvin to destroy Wonder Wharf to put up a condominium and get a nightclub for his girlfriend Fanny. When Bob goes back on his deal to convince Calvin to sell Wonder Wharf, Felix ties them up under the pier with the intention of having them drown when the tide comes in. He soon regrets his actions and tries to save them despite Fanny's interference. Felix conceived the idea of an event similar to Running of the Bulls called the "Turkey Trot" for the town's Thanksgiving festival, which turned out to be a disaster after the birds attacked the participants. Calvin banished Felix from his house, so he took up residence in the former's treehouse.
- Jairo (voiced by Jon Glaser) – Jairo is a Brazilian capoeira instructor. He first appeared as an antagonist, but returned as an ally of Bob, healing his arm with a massage. He does not pay rent and has been serially evicted from numerous buildings. His carefree attitude borders on sociopathy, as seen when he dumps excess oil on the street with no thought for potential pedestrian slippage.
- Reggie (voiced by Eddie Pepitone) – The owner of Reggie's Deli. He appears to be a careless restaurateur, openly admitting to using stale bread. He owns a leaky gazebo and gets talked into selling essential oils by a younger woman he finds attractive. On one occasion, he survived a heart attack.

=== Media personnel ===
- Chuck Charles (voiced by Thomas Lennon) – A daytime talk show host along with his co-host and ex-wife Pam. The Belchers' participation on his show caused their show to be cancelled. He then became the host of a game show called "Family Fracas". He and Pam hid their divorce for the sake of their shows, but have an antagonistic relationship behind the scenes. Chuck blames the Belchers for his show being cancelled and harbors a grudge against them that has apparently yet to dissipate.
- Pam (voiced by Samantha Bee) – A daytime talk show host. After the cancellation of her first show, Pam gets a daytime court show called "Pam's Court" despite not being a real judge. Unlike Chuck, she does not harbor resentment toward the Belchers. This is likely because she doesn't have to put up with Chuck as much thanks to them. Despite initially keeping their divorce secret from the public, Pam harbors deep resentment toward Chuck. She claims that fame ruined their marriage. She is a binge drinker.
- Olsen Benner (voiced by Pamela Adlon from 2012 to 2021, Nicole Byer since 2022) – A local news correspondent.

=== Other recurring characters ===
- Dr. Yap (voiced by Ken Jeong) – The Belcher family's dentist. He appears as a competent professional, but when the surface is scratched, he is fairly irresponsible and erratic. He is shown to be somewhat lonely and socially awkward, which leads him to inappropriate behavior with his patients and fellow members of the Beta Upsilon Pi fraternity. He is one of Tina Belcher's many crushes. Dr. Yap plays the guitar, keeping one in his dentist's office he named Greta, and loves to ski.
- Grover Fischoeder (voiced by David Wain) – The lesser-known, less rich cousin of the Fischoeder brothers. He is a lawyer who covers up their illegal activities. He later serves as an antagonist, having murdered a carnival worker six years prior and framing Mr. Fischoeder so he can get his inheritance and build a giant park over Wonder Wharf. Grover's plan was eventually thwarted by the Belcher family, and he was arrested by police.
- Gus (voiced by H. Jon Benjamin) – An elderly handyman who hangs out at the pier, airstrip, and go-kart track.
- Jen (voiced by Wendy Molyneux) – The babysitter for Gene and Louise when Tina is unavailable or isn't trusted to watch them. She is extremely ticklish and has a disfigured finger after getting it caught in a leaf blower. Jen forgets she has a prior babysitting engagement with the Belchers and goes to France instead. She also seems to be dating Christopher, a mild-mannered notary.
- Kurt Enerny (voiced by Will Forte) – Also known as "Upskirt Kurt", he is a local pilot who teaches flying lessons with his 1968 Sweetnam Eagle seaplane, named "Shoshana". He is infamous for seducing bored housewives who take lessons with him on a secluded island. Linda took lessons with him but rebuffed his advances. He later performed at the local air show with his sister Laverne, with whom he has been in fierce competition since childhood, as their father pitted them against each other to encourage their competitive spirit.
- Matthew Danko (voiced by David Herman) – He is the only park ranger for all of the parks in town. He hates doing paperwork. The kids convince him to join their puppet show at Rudy's birthday party.
- Mike Wobbles (voiced by Tim Meadows) – The reticent, reluctant, yet available mailman. One of his legs is shorter than the other. Despite walking over nine miles a day, his calf muscles are unimpressive.
- Mr. Dowling (voiced by Craig Anton) - The manager of First Oceanside Savings Bank, a bank across the street from Bob's restaurant. He has an antagonistic relationship with Bob due to how low of finances his restaurant brings, to the point where he has made it an inside joke around the bank. Whenever Bob comes to him for financial purposes, Dowling never skips an opportunity to mock Bob on account of his low income.
- Mr. Huggins (voiced by George Wallace) – A man who lives across the alley from Bob's Burgers. He is first seen talking to the Belcher kids about the racket Alice the truck driver was making. He later has Teddy and Bob help him move a new bed into his apartment as he prepares for a date.
- Officer Julia (voiced by Jerry Minor) – A local police officer. She acts tough with the people she arrests. She appears mostly with Officer Cliffany. She is later written out of the series for unknown reasons, though she has made a few cameo appearances since then.
- Officer Cliffany (voiced by Sam Seder) – Officer Cliffany is a local tall, androgynous, and overweight police officer. She works frequently with Officer Julia whenever there is a case in town. Like Officer Julia, she was written out of the series, though she has made a few appearances since then.
- The Prince of Persuasia (voiced by Rob Huebel) – Also known as "the Deuce", a "love guru", or more accurately a pick-up artist. Dr. Yap himself is a graduate of his program. Yap describes the prince to Bob by saying, "He's a prophet, and for three payments of $900 he can be your best friend." It is later revealed he also operates several other instructional businesses, including baseball coaching, magic, and inkjet printer repair. He uses a different alias or identity for each of these.
- Randy Watkins (voiced by Paul F. Tompkins) – Randy is a filmmaker who alternately appears as a friend or enemy of the Belchers. He has held various odd jobs in his appearances. Randy films a documentary and makes Bob feel guilty about making burgers by putting a cow next to his restaurant and trying to convince people not to eat there. He buys and runs a food truck. Randy helped the Belcher family film their Super Bowl commercial. Bob and Linda allow him to shoot his independent film in their restaurant after closing.
- Sergeant Bosco (voiced by Gary Cole) – An authoritarian police sergeant and Navy veteran. His last name is a reference to the movie Heat, where a detective played by Ted Levine bears the same name. He first meets the Belchers during a hostage crisis perpetrated by Mickey at the bank across the street. He nearly arrests Linda after she takes his gun in retaliation for his undermining her speed dating event. He later believes Linda to be a psychic based on rumors spreading around town. His mother Lillian is the nemesis of Edith Cranwinkle. He has a brother who is his mother's favorite.
- Speedo Guy (voiced by H. Jon Benjamin) – An unnamed blonde man in a pink Speedo and rollerblades. He is an acquaintance of the Belchers and spends most of his time on Wonder Wharf. He is a vegan, although he visits the restaurant occasionally. He has a brief romance with a woman on a unicycle wearing a mermaid costume.
- Trev (voiced by David Herman) – A bartender at Jimmy Pesto's Pizzeria. He serves as Pesto's sycophant, going along with his terrible jokes. He usually chortles when Jimmy is cruel to Bob, but has revealed he only does that because he needs Jimmy's approval to feel okay about himself. He once agreed to help Teddy in exchange for building him an intricate dog house.
- Yuli (voiced by Robert Smigel) – A security guard who works at Family Funtime. Yuli was later seen working at the roller rink, indicating that he is a freelancer. He works as a night security guard for Wagstaff. Yuli also works at OMG Mall.
