= Larry Murphy (actor) =

American actor (born 1972)

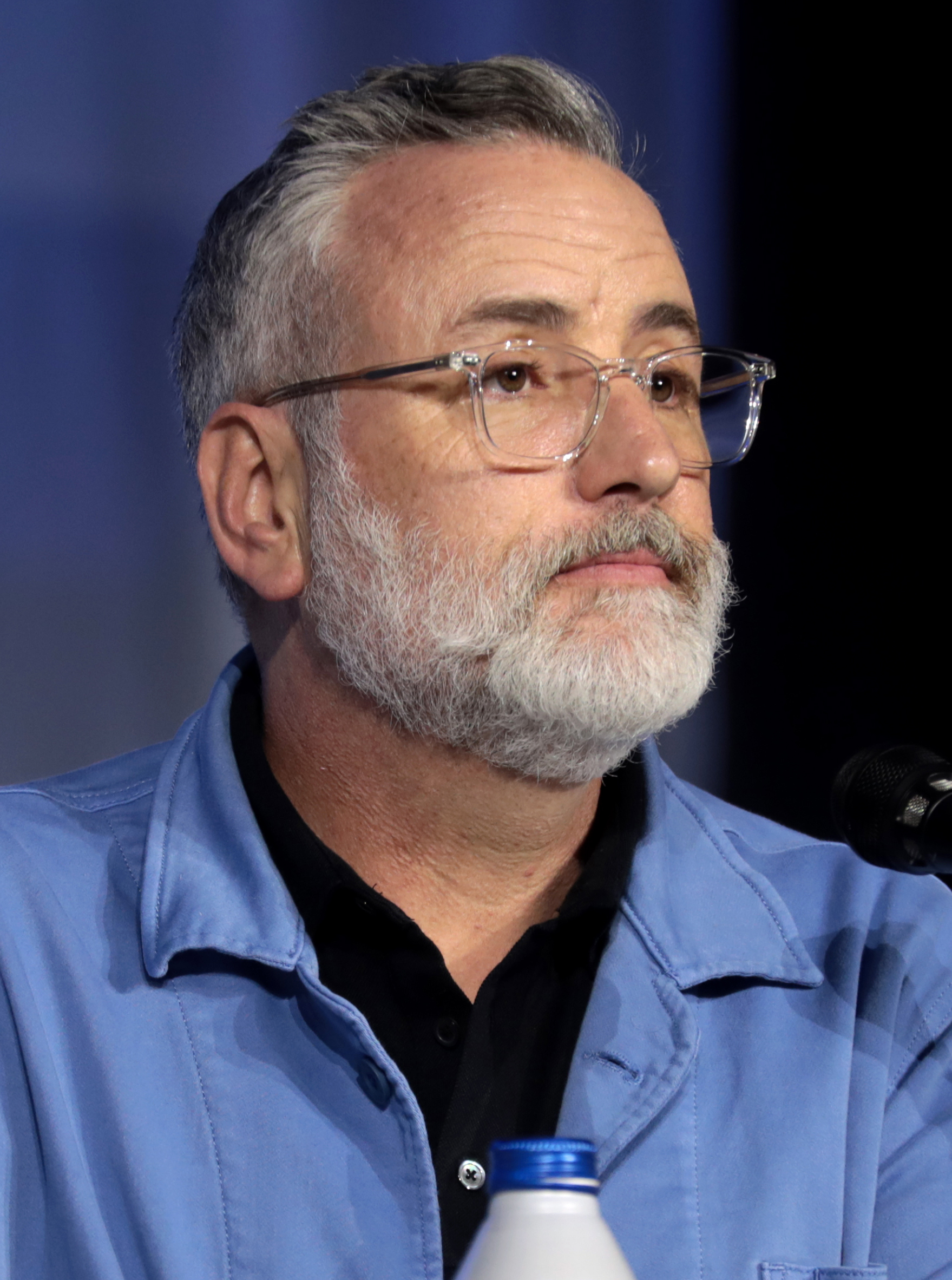
- Murphy at the 2022 WonderCon
- Born: Lawrence Murphy Jr. March 12, 1972 (age 54); Abington, Massachusetts, U.S.
- Occupations: Actor; comedian
- Years active: 1993–present
- Notable work: Assy McGee, Bob's Burgers, Ugly Americans

Lawrence Murphy Jr. (born March 12, 1972) is an American actor and comedian. He is known for his work on the TV series Late Night with Conan O'Brien, Ugly Americans, Delocated and Bob's Burgers.

== Career ==
Murphy began performing stand-up comedy in 1997 at the Comedy Studio in Harvard Square in Cambridge, Massachusetts. Soon after, he teamed up with Brendon Small. Together, they performed sketches and rock operas until 2001. Murphy's subsequent independent live work is a mix of sketch and characters.

Murphy is a voice actor renowned for his versatility. He voiced all of the main characters on the Adult Swim comedy series Assy McGee and has lent his voice to several Soup2Nuts animated shows including O'Grady, Home Movies, and WordGirl. He voices main character Teddy and several supporting characters in the animated Fox series Bob's Burgers. Additionally, Murphy voiced the hostile immigration officer Lt. Francis Grimes on the Comedy Central series Ugly Americans.

Murphy has appeared as a sketch actor on Late Night with Conan O'Brien and has a recurring role as "Jay the Doorman" on the Adult Swim live-action series Delocated.

He has toured with comedian Eugene Mirman, has performed at the Eugene Mirman Comedy Festival, and makes an appearance on his 2009 comedy album God is a Twelve-Year-Old Boy With Asperger's, providing the voice of Christopher Walken taking a customer service call.

== Selected filmography ==
=== Film ===
Year	Title	Role	Other notes
2022	My Butt Has a Fever	Teddy	Voice actor; short film
2022	The Bob's Burgers Movie	Teddy	Voice actor
TBA	The Adventures of Drunky	TBA	Voice actor

=== Television ===
Year	Title	Role	Other notes
2010, 2013, 2015, 2016	The Venture Bros.	Fallen Archer; Diamond Backdraft; Monsenor; Additional Voices	Voice Actor; TV Series
2011	Jon Benjamin Has a Van	Detective Murphy	Actor; TV series
2011–present	Bob's Burgers	Teddy; Javed Fazel; Edith Cranwinkle; Gretchen; Pocket-Sized Rudy; Various	Voice Actor; TV series
2010–2012	Ugly Americans	Lt. Francis Grimes; Aldremach Maggotbone; Burt; Various	Voice Actor; TV series
2009–2013	Delocated	Jay the Doorman	Actor; TV series
2008	Late Night with Conan O'Brien	Various	Actor; TV series
2007–2015	WordGirl	Amazing Rope Guy; Dave; Principal; Reporter; Zoo Keeper; Various characters	Voice only Animated series
2006–2008	Assy McGee	Assy McGee; Don Sanchez; The Chief; Various Characters	Voice actor Writer; Animated series
2005	Sunday Pants	Narrator (Lester Champion's Travel Logs segments)	Voice actor
2004–2006	Cheap Seats: Without Ron Parker	Boxing Announcer	Actor; TV series
2004–2006	O'Grady	Mr. Lipshitz; Pete Klesko; Various Characters	Voice actor Animated series
1999–2004	Home Movies	Drew	Voice actor

=== Video games ===
Year	Title	Role	Other notes
2011	Ugly Americans: Apocalypsegeddon	Lt. Francis Grimes; Aldremach Maggotbone	
