= Andy Kindler =

American comedian and actor (born 1956)

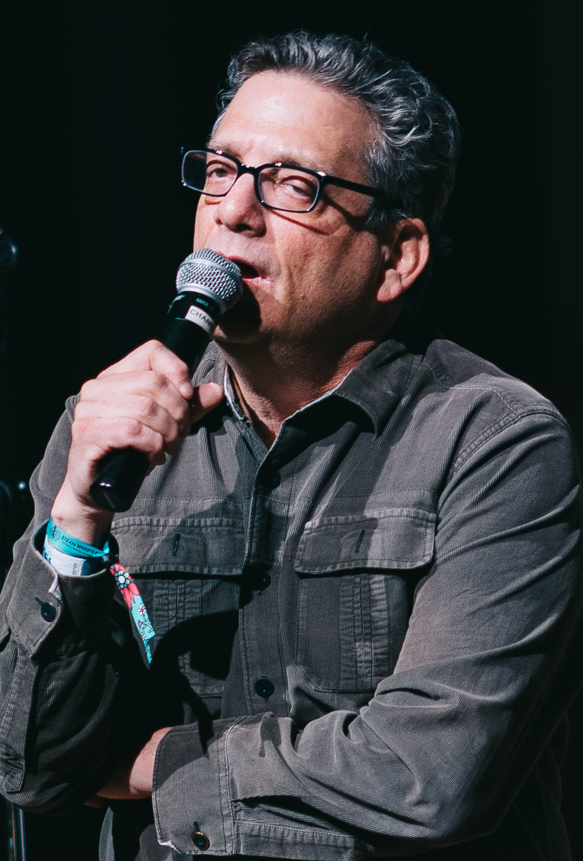
- Kindler in 2019
- Born: Andy David Kindler; October 16, 1956 (age 69); New York City, New York, U.S.
- Education: Binghamton University
- Occupations: Comedian; actor
- Years active: 1980s–present

Andy David Kindler (born October 16, 1956) is an American comedian and actor. He played the character Andy, a fellow sportswriter and friend of the titular character on the sitcom Everybody Loves Raymond, was a regular guest on Late Show with David Letterman, a contributor to The Daily Show, and has performed on HBO. Kindler frequently performs as a voice actor in animated television series from producer Loren Bouchard, including roles on Dr. Katz, Home Movies, and the recurring character of Mort the mortician on Bob's Burgers.

== Early life and education ==
Kindler was born to Lawrence and Joan Kindler in Queens, New York. He had a brother and a sister, who died in 2020. His family is Jewish. His mother had become a Quaker when Andy was 15 years old. Kindler grew up in Whitestone, Queens. Kindler graduated from Bayside High School in Bayside, Queens. He attended Binghamton University, and originally intended on becoming a classical musician. While in college, Kindler performed in theatre productions. After graduating, Kindler moved to Los Angeles. He began performing stand-up in 1984.

== Career ==
=== Stand up ===
His material often covers the comedy industry itself, criticizing other comedians for being too predictable. He has roasted other comedians on the State of the Industry address. At his annual State of the Industry address at Montreal's "Just for Laughs" festival in 2012, he poked fun at Dane Cook, Louis C.K., Chelsea Handler, and Jay Leno.

In 2010, Kindler was a judge on the stand-up reality show Last Comic Standing.

In 2018, he hosted the live taping of Megan Koester's comedy album "Tertium Non Datur," released in January 2019 by Aspecialthing Records. Kindler has hosted season four and five (2018–19) of the Hulu standup series Coming to the Stage.

In 1996, he offered $1 million to anyone who could produce a video in which Whoopi Goldberg was funny.

In 2010, Kindler released his first album, I Wish I Was Bitter, recorded in 2003. He followed this with Hence the Humor on May 8, 2020.

In 2022, Kindler performed the first live stand-up set given via hologram.

=== Acting ===
Kindler is best known as Andy on Everybody Loves Raymond. He has also appeared on several episodes of Wizards of Waverly Place as Chancellor Tootietootie.

Kindler is often thought to have portrayed the character of "Jamison" in the World Wrestling Federation, but the character was portrayed by a different actor by the name of John DiGiacomo. He plays a fictionalized version of himself in the IFC series Maron.

Kindler currently co-hosts the weekly podcast Thought Spiral with friend and fellow comedian J. Elvis Weinstein. He also appeared numerous times on The Majority Report with Sam Seder.

== Personal life ==
Kindler has been married to Susan Maljan since 2002, having been together since 1992.

== Filmography ==
Andy Kindler television work
Year	Title	Role	Notes
1993	Martin	Salesman	Episode: "To Kill a Talking Bird"
1994	Muddling Through	Beer Distributor	Episode: "It's a Date"
1995–1997	Dr. Katz, Professional Therapist	Andy (voice)	3 episodes
1995	The Larry Sanders Show	Himself	Episode: "Conflict of Interest"
1996–2005	Everybody Loves Raymond	Andy	27 episodes
1997	Ellen	Hesh Finkleman	Episode: "Ellen Unplugged"
1999	The Dick & Paula Celebrity Special	Himself (voice)	6 episodes
2001–2002	Raising Dad	Mr. Travers	16 episodes
2002–2004	Home Movies	Arnold Lindenson (voice)	4 episodes
2004	Significant Others	Doug	4 episodes
2009–2012	Wizards of Waverly Place	Chancellor Tootietootie	6 episodes
2010	'Til Death	Barry	Episode: "Perfect Couple"
2011–present	Bob's Burgers	Mort (voice)	77 episodes
2011	The Life & Times of Tim	Rabbi (voice)	Episode: "Percey Davis Boulevard/Cool Uncle Stu Balls"
2013–2016	Maron	Himself	12 episodes
2013	Crash & Bernstein	Andy	Episode: "Crashy McSmartypants"
2014	The Neighbors	Henry	Episode: "Oscar Party"
2014	Garfunkel and Oates	Michael Andrew Carson	Episode: "Road Warriors"
2015	Sirens	Bobby	Episode: "No Love"
2015–2016	Harvey Beaks	Easy (voice)	2 episodes
2016	Lady Dynamite	Himself	Episode: "Jack and Diane"
2016	Talking Tom and Friends	Galileo (voice)	Episode: "Funny Robot Galileo"
2018	Another Period	Barker	Episode: "Sex Nickelodeon"
2018	Portlandia	Dr. Benz	Episode: "Long Way Back"
2018	I'm Dying Up Here	Morris	3 episodes
2020	The Fiddling Horse	Barry Bitterman	
