= The Bob's Burgers Movie (soundtrack) =

The Bob's Burgers Movie (A Major Motion Burger Soundtrack)

Soundtrack album by various artists
- Released: May 27, 2022
- Recorded: 2020–2022
- Studio: Newman Scoring Stage
- Genre: Film soundtrack
- Length: 36:54
- Label: Hollywood
- Producer: Loren Bouchard

The Bob's Burgers Movie (A Major Motion Burger Soundtrack) (Note: Comically referred to the Original Motion Picture Soundtrack.) is the soundtrack album to the 2022 animated film The Bob's Burgers Movie, based on the animated television series Bob's Burgers. It is directed by the series creator Loren Bouchard and Bernard Derriman, in their feature directorial debuts. Besides direction, Bouchard composed the score with Patrick Dacey, Tim Dacey, Elegant Too, John Dylan Keith and Brent Knopf. Bouchard wrote some of the tracks with Nora Smith, the film's screenplay writer, while the score is conducted, orchestrated and arranged by Tim Davies. It was released on May 27, 2022, by Hollywood Records, the same day as its release.

== Development ==
The songs were written and composed amidst COVID-19 pandemic lockdown prevailed over late 2020, and the sessions continued until early 2022. The sessions began during that period as the film was anticipated for an April 2021 theatrical release. Bouchard had initially planned for several songs, as similar to Disney's musical films, but decided to limit the number of tracks as "he wanted the songs that demanded to be made, and not a single one that felt extraneous; the songs shouldn't be the fat". Four original songs, were created for the film with the third track was excluded as it may reveal the film's plot. The cast of the film performed the scripted musical numbers. Comparing it with the music of the animated show, Smith stated "in the show, we'd never do like a full-on musical, the show always has like one, maybe two songs. So, we decided we weren't going to be a full musical, we were going to be a Bob's type of musical musical. And then we just liked the idea of mixing that with mystery and action-adventure and having it be like a little bouquet of all these different genres."

While writing the first song, "Sunny Side Up Summer", Bouchard insisted the song, "a formulaic thing from the world of musicals where the character says early on in the show what they want, and everything about their interior life and hopes and dreams". In an interview to IndieWire, Bouchard had said that "The process for writing songs never stays the same. Each of the songs from the series has its own unique origin story, and that the songs for the film were vomited into existence". While writing music for the film, Smith had utilised the ukulele and three chords for the film, where she played the first two chords. On her idea, Bouchard said "if you've got an idea for a melody and you're just singing nonsense words and they can fill in the lyrics. It's probably one of the greatest pleasures in the world". The sound was considered as the basis for the song, and after the melodic portions, they recorded the horn that fits in the album. The song was produced alongside "Lucky Ducks", a punk song which Bouchard said that "the song gives a Gogol Bordello-like ditty". The third number "The Itty Bitty Ditty Committee" is served as a closure to Gene's story and featured in the end credits of the film.

H. Jon Benjamin, who played the titular character, played piano for the first time for the film, and had performed nearly four to five sessions. The score was recorded at the Newman Scoring Stage by mid-2020 and 2021. A 100-piece orchestra with over 120 musicians recorded the score, which was conducted, arranged and orchestrated by Tim Davies, and was supervised by violinist and orchestrator Maxwell Karmazyn, in his first venture as a concertmaster. Karmazyn said that the sessions were held for about 8–10 hours a day, due to COVID-19 pandemic restrictions, the sections had to be spread out six feet apart, which was a "biggest challenge". The film team had assisted the musicians and supervised recordings remotely, through Zoom, giving suggestions on the recording. Karmazyn said that despite restrictions, they managed to record the score and "the result was absolutely beautiful, the mix of the film was fantastic, sounds amazing". Several instruments such as horns, brass, woodwinds, ukulele, strings and timpani were used as they wanted the "music to be bigger and larger for the film, compared to the show so that the audience get their money worth for seeing in theatres". Derriman said "We knew that it wasn't just going to be music. It has to be physically visible on the screen."

== Track listing ==
No.	Title	Writer(s)	Performer(s)	Length
1.	"Sunny Side Up Summer"	Loren Bouchard; Nora Smith	Dan Mintz; Eugene Mirman; H. Jon Benjamin; John Roberts; Kristen Schaal	3:57
2.	"Lucky Ducks"	Bouchard; Smith	Mintz; Mirman; Benjamin; John Q. Kubin; Schaal; Larry Murphy; Paul F. Tompkins	2:20
3.	"Not That Evil"	Bouchard; Smith	Mintz; Mirman; Benjamin; Roberts; Schaal; Murphy; David Wain	5:42
4.	"Opening, Six Years Ago"	John Dylan Keith; Bouchard		1:04
5.	"No One Came in Today"	Bouchard		1:03
6.	"The Ride"	Carmine Coppola; Shirley Walker		0:55
7.	"Emergency Kid Meeting"	Elegant Too		0:31
8.	"Try to Look Like Alley Trash"	Bouchard		1:15
9.	"Treehouse Go"	Keith; Patrick Dacey		0:59
10.	"He's Here"	Keith		1:27
11.	"Tina, You Go First"	Keith; P. Dacey		1:30
12.	"What's Felix Doing?"	Elegant Too		0:59
13.	"Left at the Clown Head"	Brent Knopf; Tim Dacey		0:44
14.	"Brave Little Cart"	Knopf		0:31
15.	"Go Burger People Go"	T. Dacey		2:09
16.	"Would It Be Faster to Get Out and Walk?"	Elegant Too; Bouchard		3:29
17.	"These Friggin' Ears"	Bouchard; T. Dacey		1:35
18.	"The Mole Hill"	Keith; Elegant Too; T. Dacey		4:13
19.	"Sunny Side Up" (Instrumental)	Bouchard		3:06
20.	"Lucky Ducks" (Instrumental)	Bouchard		2:00
Total length:				36:54

== Reception ==
Julia Delbel of Comingsoon.net said "The songs also just aren't memorable or as catchy in and of themselves. Fortunately, the musical numbers are fairly few and far between and there are only just enough to classify this as a musical". Emily Heller of Vulture expressed disappointment on the least number of original songs present in the film, as "The songs of Bob's Burgers set the tone of the world, underscore emotional moments, and, of course, provide fertile ground for jokes". While opining, about the directors' intention to provide a full musical that was scrapped due to pandemic restrictions, she felt that as "true of each individual number on its own — the animation team went all out on the dancing sequences, filling the big screen with colorful bodies moving in rhythm — they're too spread out for the movie to feel like a musical 'spectacle'". Polygon's Joshua Rivera also felt the same, saying "A feature length lets the film be a proper musical at times, as what would be little ditties on the show are expanded to full-on musical numbers with ambitious staging and more jokes. (There are, unfortunately, fewer songs than expected; the movie has more music, but it's not a musical)."

Jeff Ewing of Forbes had said that "The series is known for its myriad songs (among other things), and this film is no different. In this setting, the songs are much too long (the first especially), ill-fit, and not quite funny enough to justify how long they are." Ben Sherlock of Screen Rant called the soundtrack of the film as a "mixed bag" as some of the numbers are "catchy and well-written", while the rest of the album are "forgettable" and termed as "unnecessary detours that stop the plot dead". Scott Tobias of The Guardian wrote that the songs are "a goof on splashy production numbers, squeaked out by tuneless New Jersey voices and choreography that's less Busby Berkeley than Lars von Trier's Dancer in the Dark".

== Chart performance ==
Chart performance for The Bob's Burgers Movie (A Major Motion Burger Soundtrack)
Chart (2022)	Peak position
US Billboard 200	56
US Top Comedy Albums (Billboard)	8
US Top Soundtracks (Billboard)	33

== Release history ==
Release dates and formats for The Bob's Burgers Movie (A Major Motion Picture Soundtrack)
Region	Date	Format(s)	Label	Ref.
Various	May 27, 2022	digital download; streaming	Hollywood	
Various	December 16, 2022	Vinyl	Rough Trade	
