= My Butt Has a Fever =

2022 short film directed by Loren Bouchard

- The short film sees Tina, Gene, and Louise perform the titular song at the school's talent show.
- Directed by: Loren Bouchard; Bernard Derriman
- Written by: Loren Bouchard; Nora Smith
- Produced by: Janelle Momary-Neely
- Starring: H. Jon Benjamin; Dan Mintz; Eugene Mirman; Larry Murphy; John Roberts; Kristen Schaal; David Herman; Brian Huskey
- Edited by: Kris Fitzgerald; Michael Matzdorff
- Music by: Loren Bouchard; Nora Smith
- Production company: 20th Century Studios
- Distributed by: 20th Century Studios
- Release date: May 2022 (Alamo Drafthouse Cinema)
- Running time: 6 minutes
- Country: United States
- Language: English

My Butt Has a Fever (Note: Registered as My Butt Hazza Fever by the Motion Picture Association) is a 2022 American animated comedy short film based on the Fox animated sitcom Bob's Burgers. It is directed by the series creator Loren Bouchard and series director Bernard Derriman, written by Bouchard and Nora Smith, and produced by Janelle Momary-Neely. It features the voices of series regulars H. Jon Benjamin, Dan Mintz, Eugene Mirman, Larry Murphy, John Roberts, Kristen Schaal, David Herman, and Brian Huskey. It centers on the Belcher kids as they perform the titular song at Wagstaff School's talent show, much to the dismay of Mr. Frond.

My Butt Has a Fever debuted in front of film screenings in Alamo Drafthouse Cinema theaters across the United States in May 2022. It later premiered on FXX that same month in a move to promote The Bob's Burgers Movie, which released in theaters on May 27, 2022.

== Plot ==
Bob and Linda close the restaurant for the day so that they can see their kids, Tina, Gene, and Louise, perform at the school's talent show. At the talent show, the kids are aided by Teddy, who is under the stage and is given the go-ahead to start the music. They begin to sing the song, "My Butt Has a Fever", which shocks Mr. Frond and sends him on a frenzy to put an end to their performance.

Eventually, Mr. Frond chases the kids off the stage and outside, when the trio quickly run back inside and lock the disgruntled guidance counselor out in response. Tina, Gene, and Louise get back on stage to continue the song, to an excitable crowd. Mr. Frond makes his way back into the auditorium via the school's front door and declares that the kids all have detention. The next day, Tina, Gene, and Louise serve their punishment but agree that the performance was worth the trouble.

== Voice cast ==
- H. Jon Benjamin as Bob Belcher
- Dan Mintz as Tina Belcher
- Eugene Mirman as Gene Belcher
- Larry Murphy as Teddy
- John Roberts as Linda Belcher
- Kristen Schaal as Louise Belcher
- David Herman as Mr. Frond
- Brian Huskey as Rudy

== Production ==
In 2020, Bob's Burgers creator Loren Bouchard confirmed that Disney was initially planning to release an original short film based on the show, My Butt Has a Fever, in front of one of their theatrical releases. This move would have mirrored the previous decision to have The Simpsons 2020 short film Playdate with Destiny release in front of Pixar's Onward that same year. The COVID-19 pandemic however scuttled these plans for a while. In May 2022, Alamo Drafthouse Cinema announced that the short film would debut in front of film screenings in their theaters across the United States, in a promotional campaign for the then-upcoming The Bob's Burgers Movie (2022).

== Release ==
My Butt Has a Fever debuted in front of film screenings in Alamo Drafthouse Cinema theaters across the United States in May 2022. The short later premiered on FXX that same month to promote The Bob's Burgers Movie, which released in theaters on May 27. The short was later released as a bonus feature on the Blu-ray releases of the film on July 19, 2022. The song from the short was released by Hollywood Records on digital platforms and as a part of The Bob's Burgers Movie soundtrack vinyl in January 13, 2023.

== Reception ==
John Schwarz of Bubbleblabber gave the short film an 8 out of 10 rating. He commented on the animation quality's similarities to The Bob's Burgers Movie and wrote: "I'm not sure it's worth sitting around on FXX in waiting for the short to premiere, but, if like The Simpsons, Disney wanted to get more shorts produced for Hulu or Disney+ or something, I'd be totally down."
