= God Is a Twelve-Year-Old Boy with Asperger's =

Live album by Eugene Mirman
- Released: October 6, 2009
- Genre: Stand-up comedy
- Label: Sub Pop

Eugene Mirman chronology
En Garde, Society (2006)	God Is a Twelve-Year-Old Boy with Asperger's (2009)

God Is a Twelve-Year-Old Boy with Asperger's is the third album by American stand-up comedian Eugene Mirman. The album was released on October 6, 2009 by Sub Pop.

== Track listing ==
1. Hello and Several Jokes on Topics Ranging from Elevators to Goofing Around on a Whale Watch — 5:41
2. My Gas Got Shut Off-Boo! — 2:30
3. Vancouver, Detroit and Bears! — 3:38
4. Divisive Online Banner Ads — 1:36
5. America Is Better Than Abortion — 1:18
6. The Questionable Polls of Russia Today — 5:22
7. I Found an iPod — 1:01
8. The Will to Whatevs Book Tour and an Amazing Boy with Asperger's — 2:52
9. Classmates.com — 5:07
10. Sex, ??? AirLIES and Videotape: A Three-Part Radio Play Very Based on a True Story* — 6:41
11. My Letter to ??? Airlines, Your Postcard to ??? Airlines* — 5:51

*The airline mentioned in these tracks is Delta Air Lines. The airline's name is bleeped out on the tracks.
