= Mighty Animation =

Animation studio based in Guadalajara, Mexico

mighty animation
- Founded: 2012; 14 years ago
- Founder: Luispa Salmon; Claudio Jimenez
- Headquarters: Guadalajara, Mexico
- Website: mighty.mx

Mighty animation (styled by the company as "mighty animation") is a Mexican animation studio based in Guadalajara, Mexico. It mainly specializes in 2D & CG animation, storyboarding, and designing for projects from major global brands such as Disney, Adult Swim, Netflix, and Nickelodeon.

== History ==
Mighty animation was founded in 2012 in Guadalajara, Mexico by Luispa Salmon and Claudio Jimenez. In its early years, it mainly worked on advertisements and short films. Conejo en la Luna, which was co-produced with Canal 22, received an Ariel Award nomination.

During the 2017 Pixelatl festival in Cuernavaca, the company greenlighted Viking Tales (Vikingos in Spanish), a series of animated shorts produced by the studio in co-production of Cartoon Network's Latin American branch. In 2019, Mighty Animation collaborated with Pixelatl and Anima Estudios for the creation of the educational platform La Cumbre.

One of Mighty's inspiration comes from the tapestry weaving art.

== Selected filmography ==
This list is incomplete. Additional titles may be added.

=== Television ===
- Archibald's Next Big Thing
- Charlie M
- Cleopatra in Space
- Droners
- Legend Quest
- Plop TV
- Rick and Morty (season 5)
- Rise of the Teenage Mutant Ninja Turtles
- Saddie Sparks
- Vampirina - "The Ghoul Girls"
- Wild City (Ciudad salvaje)
- Yakka Dee
- Moon Girl and Devil Dinosaur
- La Vida Secreta de tu Mente
- The Simpsons - Treehouse of Horror XXXV opening scene

=== Film ===
- The Bob's Burgers Movie (additional animation)
- America: The Motion Picture
- Cranston Academy: Monster Zone (storyboarding)
- La leyenda del Charro Negro (additional character design and animation)
- La leyenda del Chupacabras (additional animation)
- Untitled feature film (TBA)
- The Casagrandes Movie (animation production)
- La Venganza del Charro Negro (additional animation due Ánima's controversy)

=== Shorts ===
- Best Baddies
- Cupcakery of Doom
- Juan Futbol
- Mickey Mouse Thanksgiving short
- Pibby
- Star Wars Galaxy of Creatures
- Viaje sideral
- Viking Tales (Vikingos)

=== Others ===
- Canal 22 - "¡Clic Clac! en invierno"
- Las aventuras de Sfero & Jhonny-C (Sphero animated short)
- Pixelatl
- The Yellow Castle (book series)
