= The Bob's Burgers Movie =

2022 film by Loren Bouchard and Bernard Derriman

- Theatrical release poster
- Directed by: Loren Bouchard; Bernard Derriman
- Screenplay by: Loren Bouchard; Nora Smith
- Based on: Bob's Burgers by Loren Bouchard
- Produced by: Janelle Momary-Neely; Loren Bouchard; Nora Smith
- Starring: H. Jon Benjamin; Dan Mintz; Eugene Mirman; Larry Murphy; John Roberts; Kristen Schaal; David Wain; Zach Galifianakis; Kevin Kline
- Edited by: Kris Fitzgerald
- Music by: John Dylan Keith; Loren Bouchard; Patrick Dacey; Tim Dacey; Elegant Too; Brent Knopf
- Production company: 20th Century Studios
- Distributed by: 20th Century Studios (Note: through Buena Vista International in several other territories)
- Release dates: May 17, 2022 (El Capitan Theatre); May 27, 2022 (United States)
- Running time: 102 minutes
- Country: United States
- Language: English
- Budget: $38 million
- Box office: $34.2 million

The Bob's Burgers Movie is a 2022 American animated musical comedy film directed by Loren Bouchard and Bernard Derriman from a screenplay by Bouchard and Nora Smith. Based on the animated sitcom created by Bouchard, the starring voice cast includes series regulars H. Jon Benjamin, Dan Mintz, Eugene Mirman, Larry Murphy, John Roberts, Kristen Schaal, David Wain, Zach Galifianakis, and Kevin Kline. Set between the 12th and 13th seasons of Bob's Burgers, the plot follows Bob and his family's struggles with paying their loan after a sinkhole opens in front of their restaurant and affects business, while the kids try to solve the murder of a carnie.

The Bob's Burgers Movie premiered at the El Capitan Theatre in Hollywood on May 17, 2022, and was theatrically released by 20th Century Studios in the United States on May 27, following previous delays of almost two years due to the COVID-19 pandemic. The film received positive reviews from critics, but only grossed $34 million against a $38 million budget, becoming a box office disappointment.

== Plot ==
One night, two figures get into a fight at Wonder Wharf. A gunshot rings out and one of the figures falls.

Six years later, the Belcher family prepares for the summer: Bob and Linda plan to extend their loan from the bank, Tina plans to confess to her crush Jimmy Jr., Gene constructs an instrument to perform at Wonder Wharf's bandshell, and Louise wants to prove she is brave.

Bob and Linda are denied an extension on their loan and are told they have seven days to pay it or their restaurant equipment will get repossessed. They decide to ask their landlord, Mr. Calvin Fischoeder, if they can skip rent for the month until they pay the loan. However, after a sinkhole forms in front of the restaurant, a skeleton of a carnie named Cotton Candy Dan is discovered in it by the kids, and Mr. Fischoeder is charged for the murder. If he is convicted, they will not be able to get the rent skipped.

The Belcher children skip school in an attempt to investigate the murder themselves and clear Mr. Fischoeder of wrongdoing. After investigating Wonder Wharf's carnies, questioning police Sergeant Bosco, and searching the Fischoders' treehouse, they conclude that Mr. Fischoeder's brother Felix is the killer and tail him to Wonder Wharf, where they end up in a secret clubhouse underneath a ride called the Mole Hill. Calvin, Felix, and their cousin and family lawyer Grover are hiding out in the clubhouse until the two brothers can flee the country over the murder charge. Louise sees a photo that shows Grover wearing a cufflink that was found on the skeleton, and spots a faded bite mark on Grover's wrist, revealing that he was in fact the murderer. However, Grover realizes Louise is onto him, grabs a speargun from a shooting gallery and takes everyone hostage.

Meanwhile at the restaurant, Bob, Linda, and their family-friend Teddy prepare to sell burgers at Wonder Wharf using a food cart that Teddy builds to come up with the money for the loan and rent. They make a good amount of money, but after provoking the carnies, Bob and Linda run into the Mole Hill and fall into the secret clubhouse, where Grover takes them hostage as well, while Teddy escapes to the restaurant.

Grover reveals he killed Cotton Candy Dan to frame Calvin to get the family trust money, and that he plans to kill Calvin, Felix, and the Belchers before burning down Wonder Wharf with a lit fuse to build a "mega park" in its place. As he orders Calvin and Felix into a submersible to drown them, the Belchers flee in a microcar but are pursued by Grover, who buries them in the sinkhole. Though they are trapped inside the microcar, Bob manages to break a water main to launch it out, and they are freed by Teddy. The group returns to the Mole Hill, where Louise stops the fuse before it can spark a fire. Calvin and Felix are rescued from the submersible, while Grover is arrested. Later, at the end of the week, Calvin gives Bob and Linda money for the loan, Louise proves her bravery to a bully on the playground, Tina confesses to Jimmy Jr., and Gene's band performs at the bandshell.

== Voice cast ==
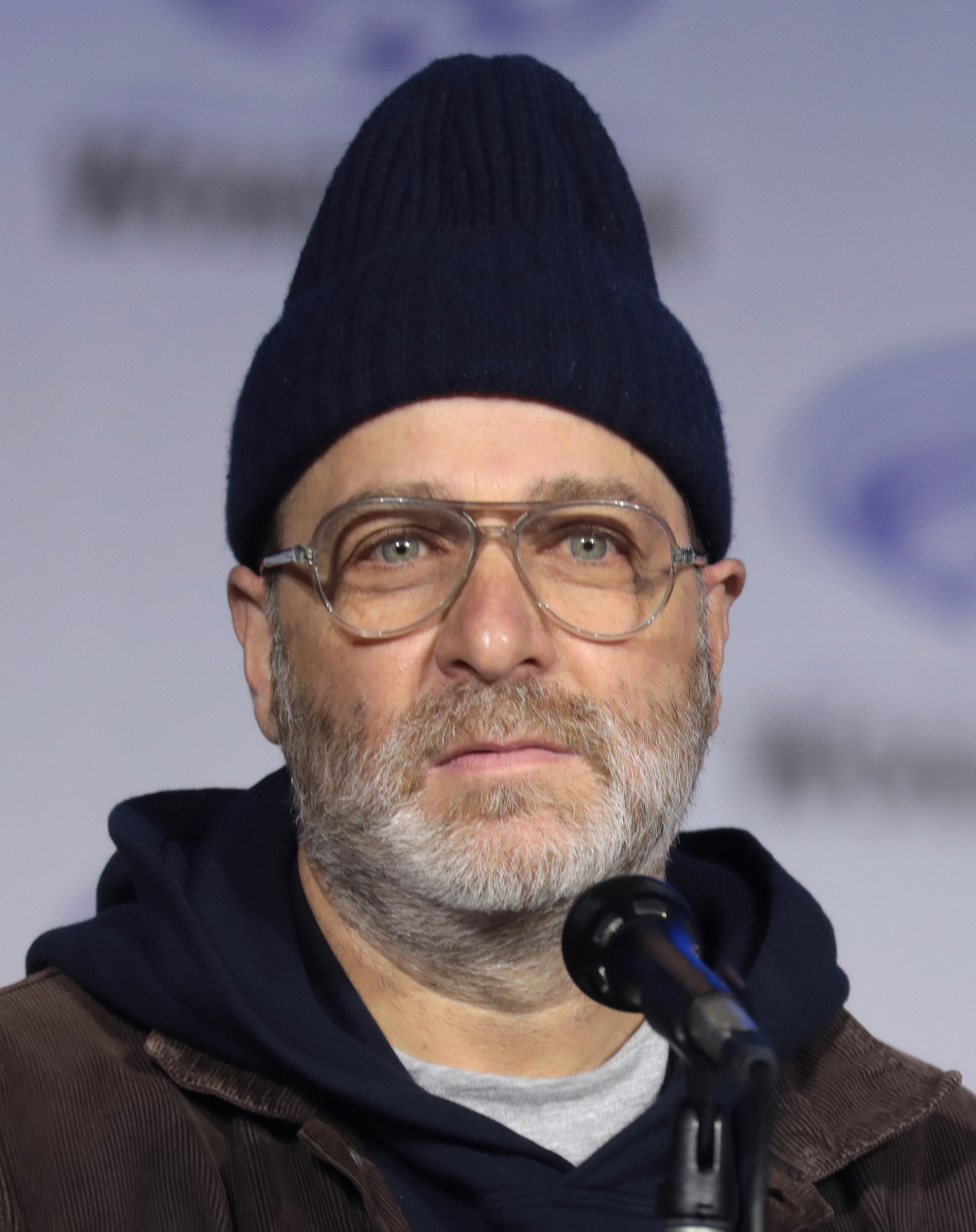
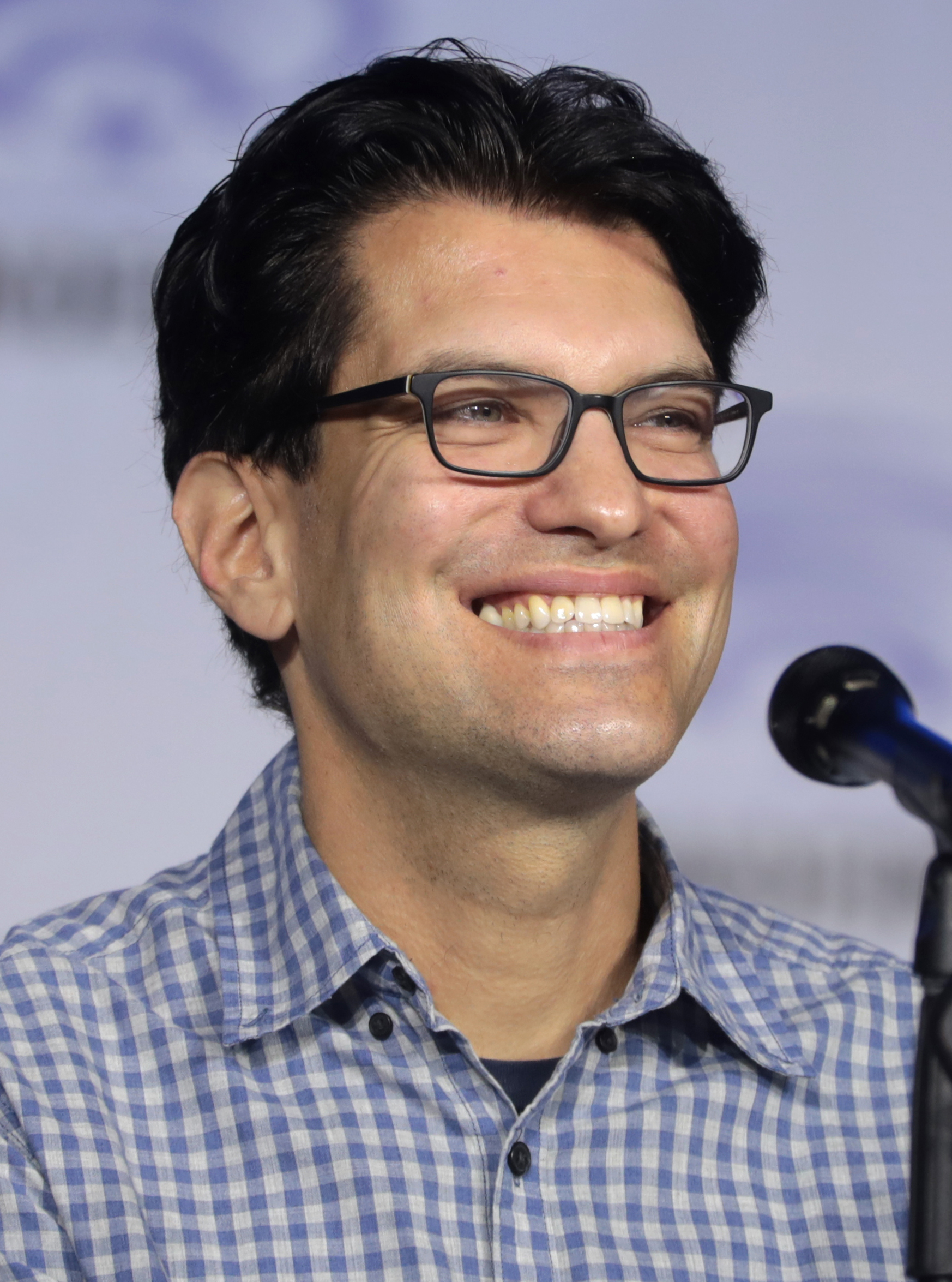
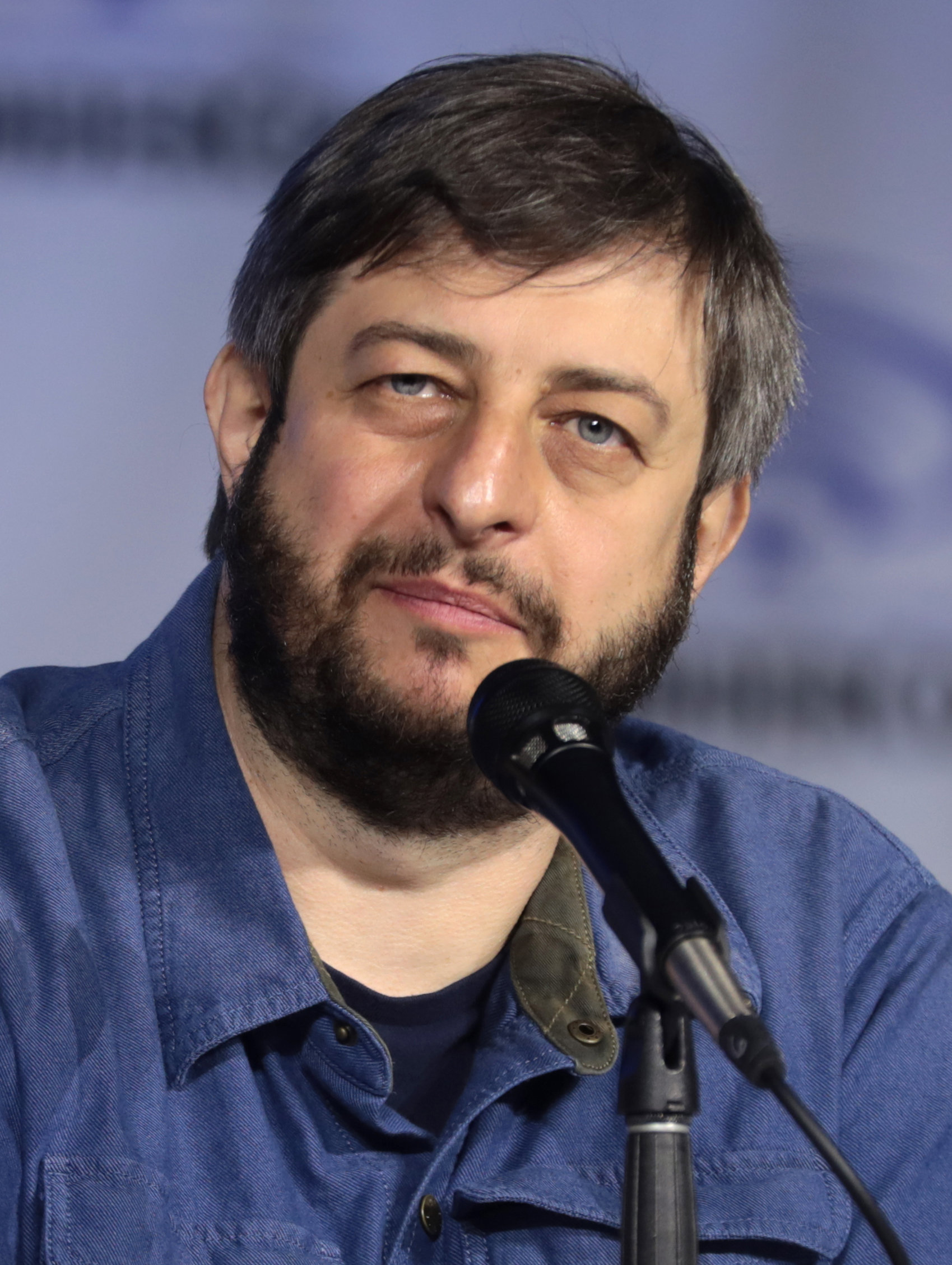
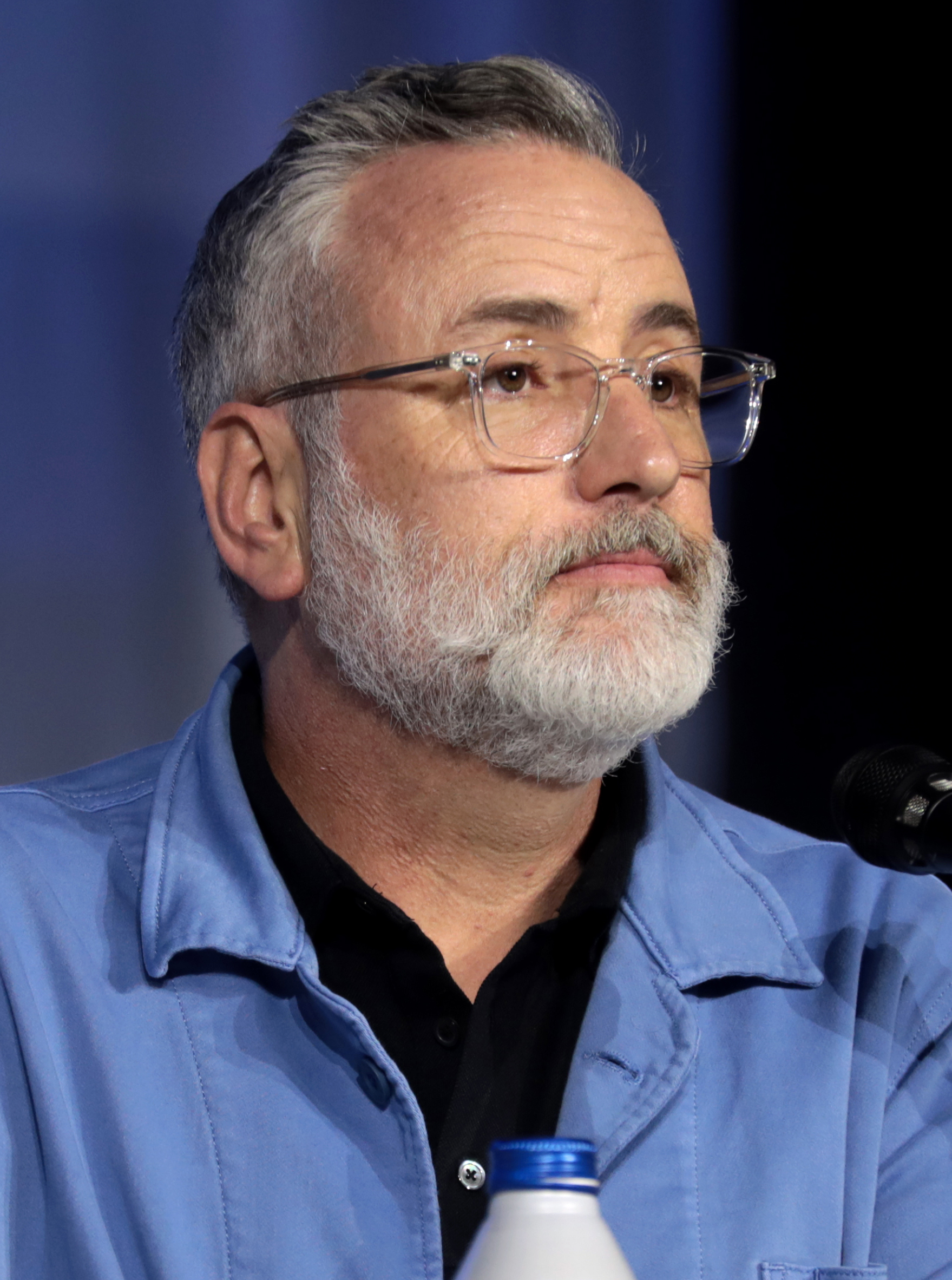
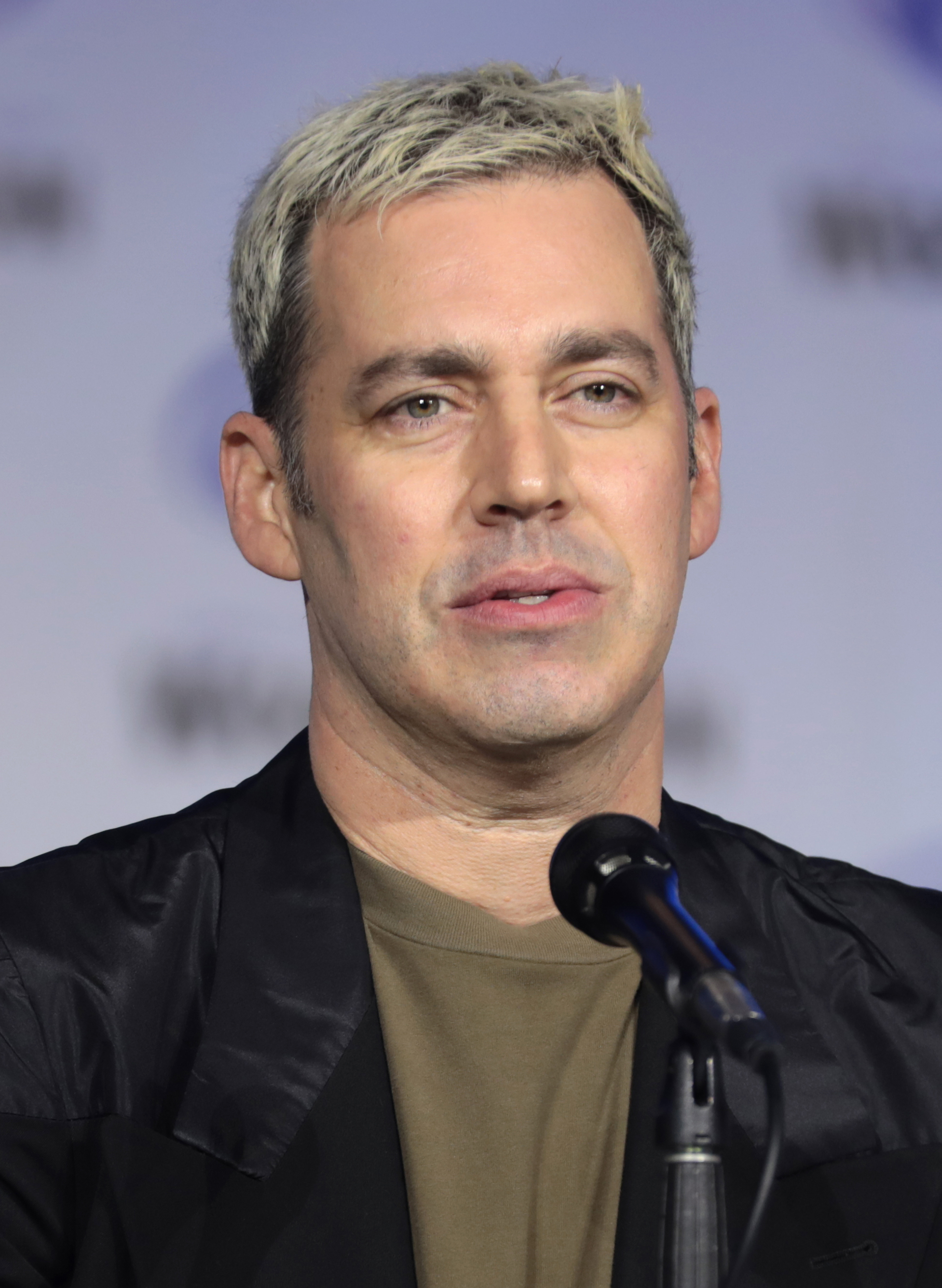
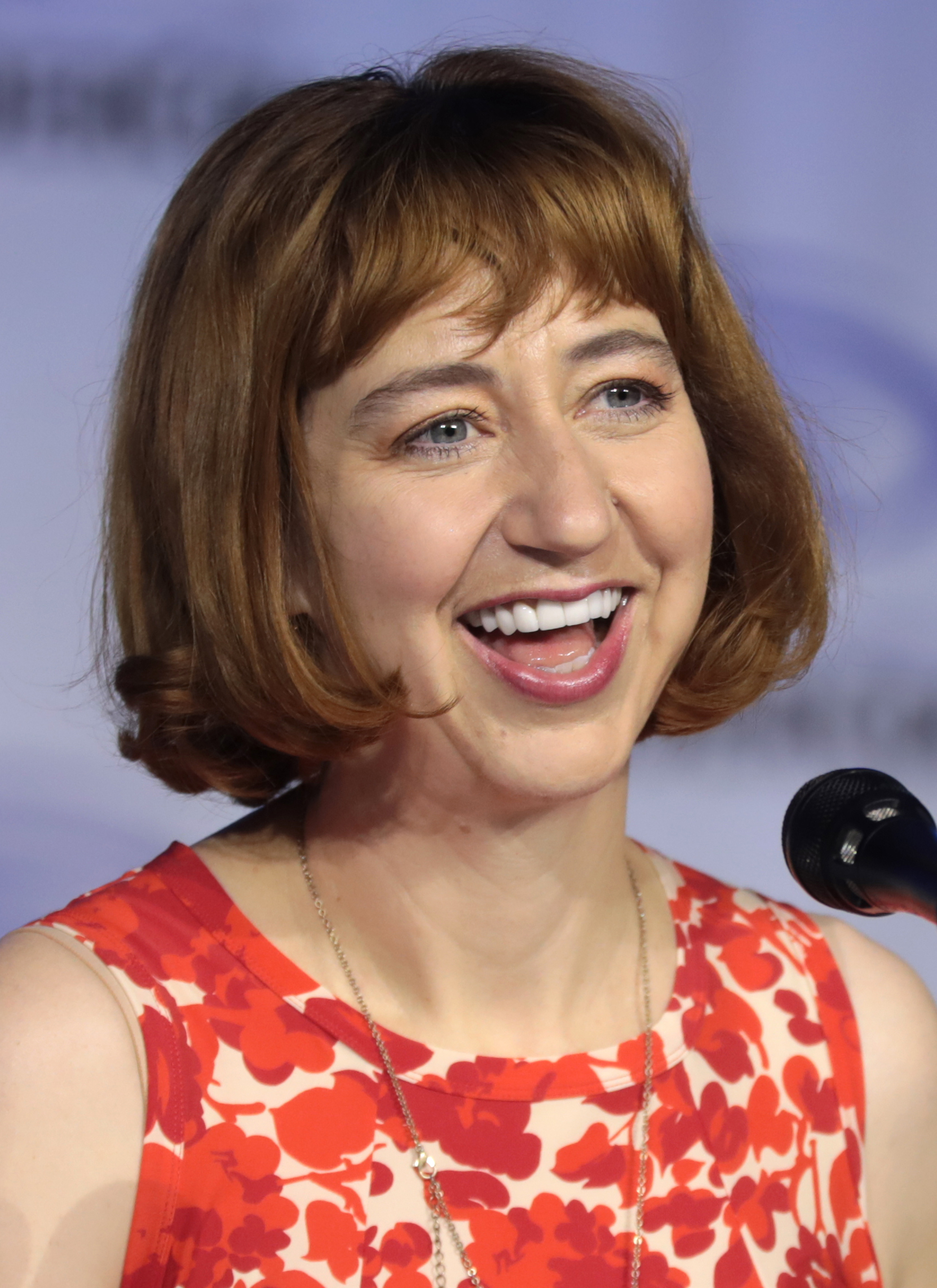
Clockwise from top left: The voice cast includes H. Jon Benjamin (Bob), Dan Mintz (Tina), Eugene Mirman (Gene), Kristen Schaal (Louise), John Roberts (Linda), and Larry Murphy (Teddy).
- H. Jon Benjamin as Bob Belcher, Jimmy Pesto Jr., Ms. LaBonz, Bad Kuchi Kopi and Good Kuchi Kopi
- Dan Mintz as Tina Belcher
- Eugene Mirman as Gene Belcher
- Larry Murphy as Teddy
- John Roberts as Linda Belcher and Jocelyn
- Kristen Schaal as Louise Belcher
- David Wain as Grover Fischoeder
- Zach Galifianakis as Felix Fischoeder
- Kevin Kline as Calvin Fischoeder
- Gary Cole as Sgt. Bosco
- Paul F. Tompkins as Short Carnie
- John Q. Kubin as Mickey
- Nick Kroll as Scary Carnie
- Craig Anton as Mr. Dowling
- David Herman as Mr. Frond and Robot
- Jaime Moyer as Ticket Seller Lady
- Brian Huskey as Regular-Sized Rudy
- Bobby Tisdale as Zeke
- Stephanie Beatriz as Chloe Barbash
- Jordan Peele as Fanny
- Rob Huebel as Dizzy Dog Carnie
- Parvesh Cheena as Potential Customer
- Aziz Ansari as Darryl
- Jenny Slate as Tammy
- Nicole Byer as Olsen Benner
- Robert Ben Garant as Critter
- Laura Silverman as Andy Pesto
- Sarah Silverman as Ollie Pesto
- Sam Seder as Hugo
- Paul Rudd as Jericho
- Ron Lynch as Ron
- Andy Kindler as Mort
- Ashley Nicole Black as Harley
- Brooke Dillman as Reporter

Additional voices by H. Jon Benjamin, Loren Bouchard, Katie Crown, David Herman, Phil LaMarr, Larry Murphy, Hannah Parikh, Ben Pronsky, John Roberts, Michelle Ruff, and David Zyler.

The characters of Jimmy Pesto Sr., Jackie the Crossing Guard, Cotton Candy Dan, Speedo Guy, Courtney, Mike the Mailman, Trev, Peter Pescadaro, Dodomeki, Bakaneko, Okoro Kamui, Burobu and Little King Trashmouth appear but have no lines. The characters of Gretchen, Mr. Business, Aunt Gayle, Harold and Edith Cranwinkle, Marshmallow, Mr. Branca and Arnold Evans appear only in the sequence during the closing credits, in which various characters are seen dancing to the song "My Burger Buns". Gene's imaginary friend Ken is mentioned.

== Production ==
=== Development ===
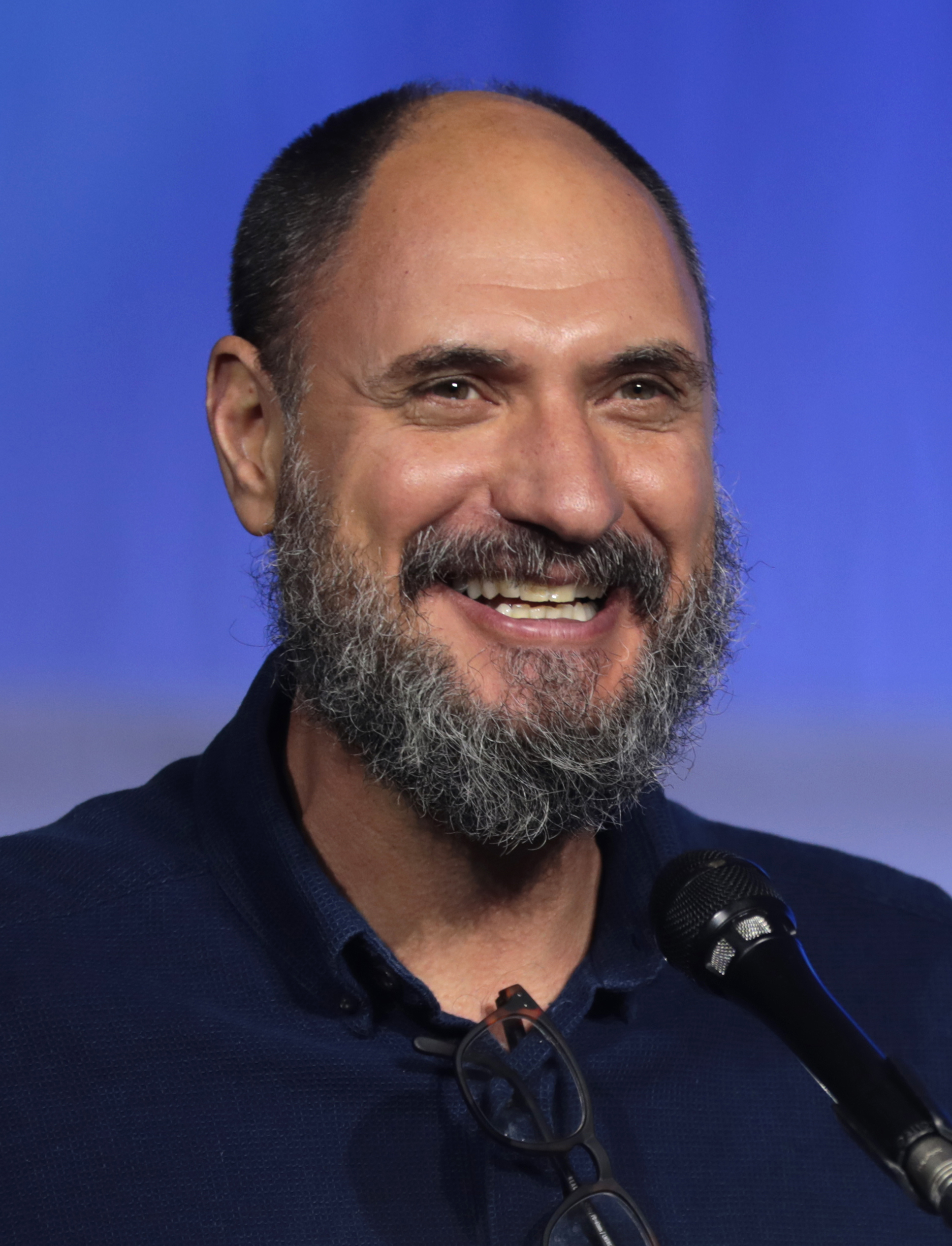
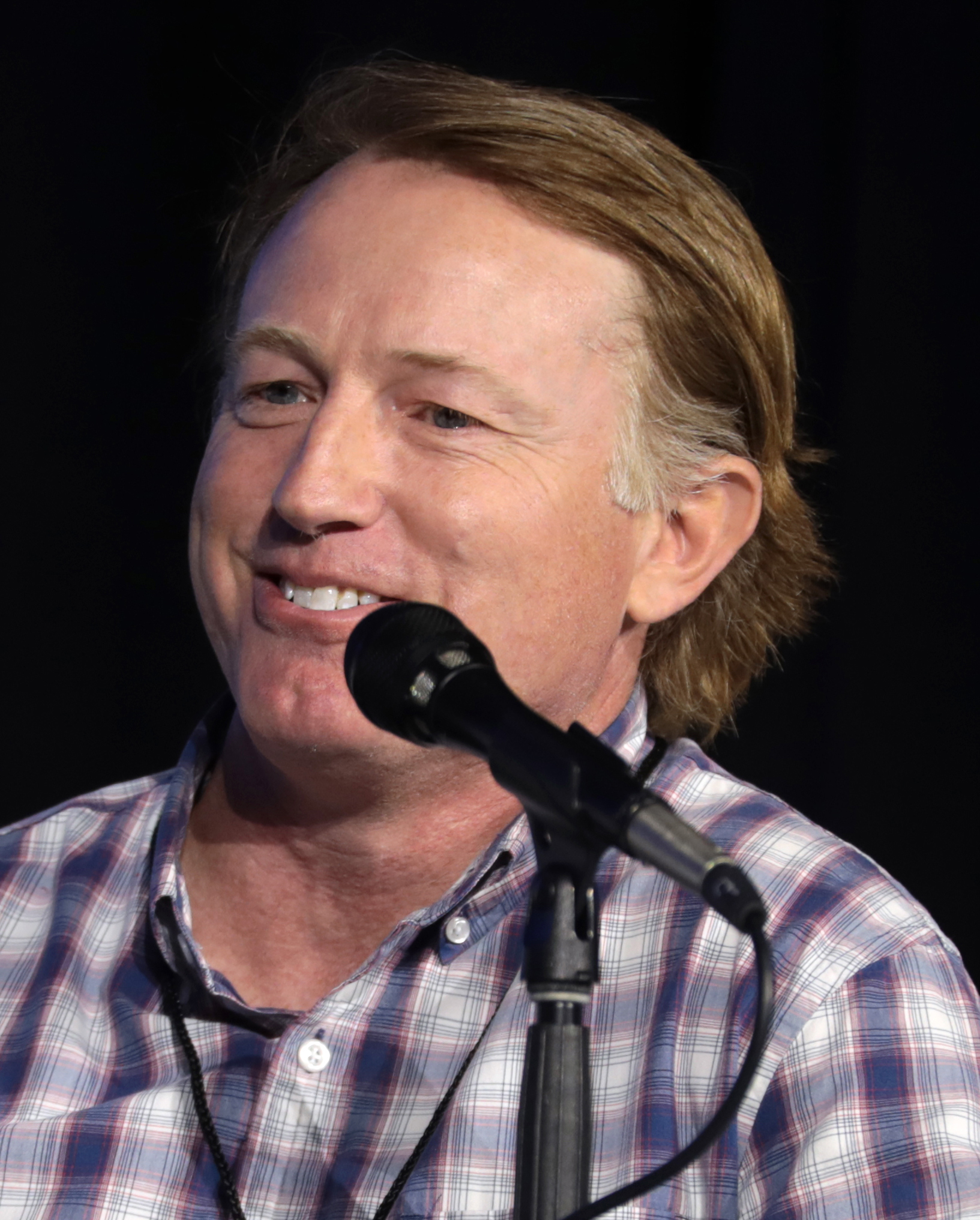
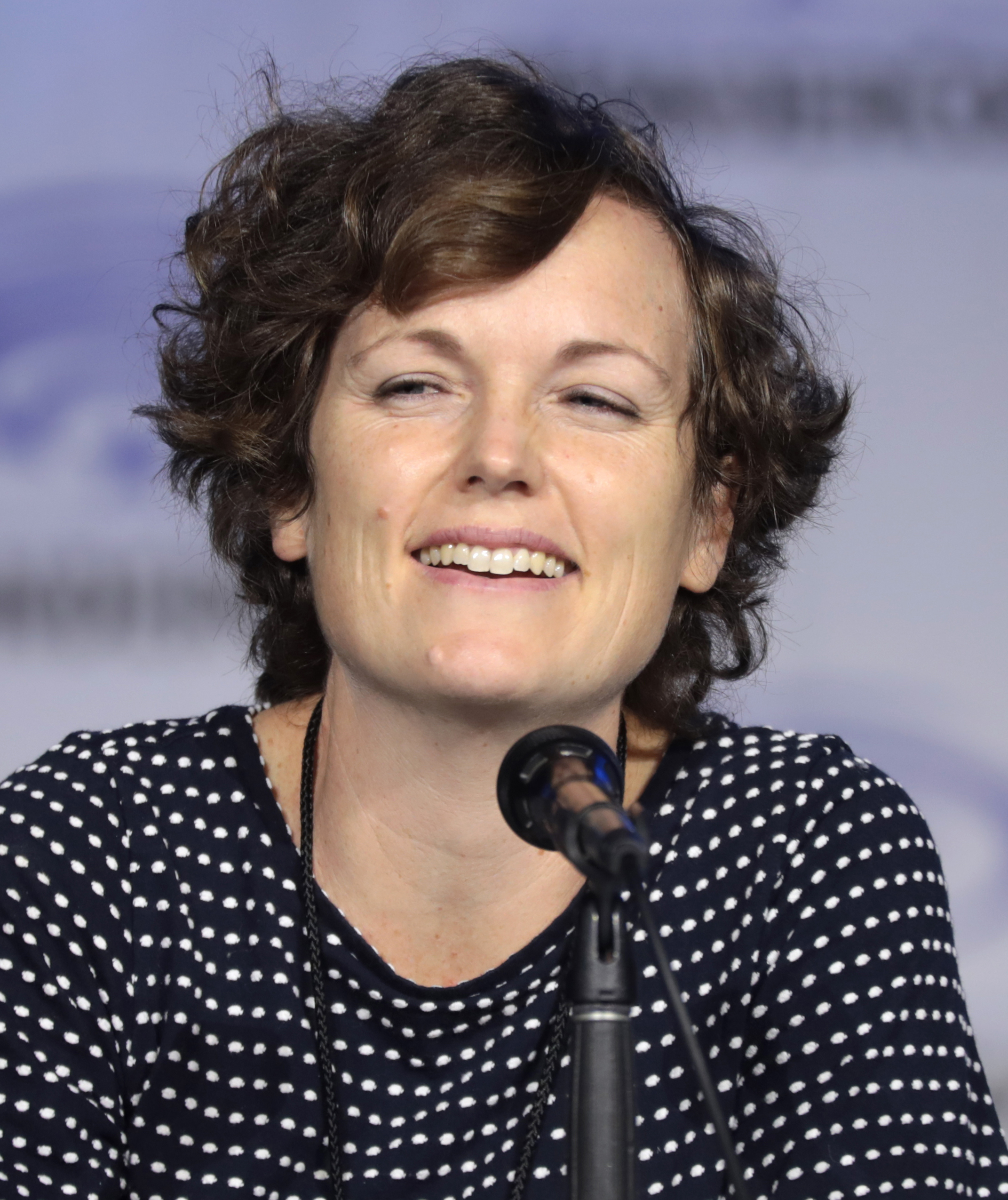
From left to right: Co-director and co-writer Loren Bouchard, co-director Bernard Derriman, and co-writer Nora Smith

On October 4, 2017, 20th Century Fox announced that a film adaptation based on the Fox animated series Bob's Burgers was in development, and it was scheduled to be released on July 17, 2020. On October 30, 2017, Vanessa Morrison, who became the president of a newly created 20th Century Fox division, Fox Family, was also chosen to oversee production on the film.

Series creator Loren Bouchard had said the film would "scratch every itch the fans of the show have ever had", while also appealing to new audiences. On July 18, 2018, Bouchard said that the script was submitted and accepted by the studios. The film is a musical comedy. On September 24, 2020, star H. Jon Benjamin confirmed that work on the film was being done remotely due to the COVID-19 pandemic, while also revealing that recording for the film has already begun, with the cast reprising their roles from the television series.

Bouchard said the budget for the film was $38 million and estimated that an additional $20 million was spent on marketing.

=== Animation ===
Animation services were provided by Tonic DNA, Lighthouse Studios, Bento Box Entertainment, Golden Wolf, Yeson Ententainment, Brilliant Pictures, Synergy Animation, Mighty Animation, Nørlum, Dave Enterprises, and Mercury Filmworks. The production team wanted the film to be mostly done through hand-drawn animation because they wanted the visuals to remain similar to the series, this would not only make it the first 20th Century Studios animated film to utilize primarily traditional animation since The Simpsons Movie in 2007, but also the first traditionally animated theatrical feature film to be distributed by Disney since Winnie the Pooh in 2011. The larger budget, time, and animators available to the filmmakers allowed the animation to be more detailed than in the original series, such as adding more light, texture, and shadows into several shots. This film would be the final animation work for both Tuck Tucker and Dale Baer before their deaths on December 22, 2020, and January 15, 2021, respectively. Tucker served as a storyboard revisionist, while Baer provided animation for the film. Mercury Filmworks also worked with Cartoon Saloon to help with the animation, through Lighthouse Studios.

Tonic DNA, who were hired due to already working with Bento Box Entertainment on the animated series Central Park, was originally set to work only in musical numbers, before being assigned two additional sequences. Animators at Tonic DNA used both hand-drawn and cutout animation techniques for the film, with both being simultaneously used in certain sequences, particularly the "Lucky Ducks" musical number.

== Music ==
Songs for the film were written by Loren Bouchard and Nora Smith while the original score was conducted, orchestrated and arranged by Tim Davies. The soundtrack album was released on May 27, 2022, and includes three of the four songs featured in the film. The third song was excluded to avoid revealing details of the film's plot; it was added into later reissues, including the vinyl edition.

== Release ==
=== Theatrical ===
The Bob's Burgers Movie premiered at the El Capitan Theatre in Hollywood on May 17, 2022 and was theatrically released in the United States on May 27, 2022. It was initially scheduled to be released in theaters on July 17, 2020. The film was then briefly pulled from the schedule due to an error in listings. In announcing revised released dates of various films due to the global health crisis of the COVID-19 pandemic, Disney announced that the film's release had been pushed back to April 9, 2021. On January 22, 2021, the film was completely removed from the release schedule. Bouchard explained that despite the film still being in production, a new release date announcement was not imminent and would not come until audiences felt completely safe coming back to theaters. On September 10, 2021, it was officially set for a Memorial Day weekend release date of May 27, 2022. In some countries however, such as Portugal, Spain, France, Mexico, Italy, and Israel, a theatrical release of the film did not end up happening at all despite there already being marked release dates for said countries, with the film instead premiering directly on Disney+ later on July 13, 2022, in those regions and on Star+ July 20, 2022, in Latin America.

=== Home media ===
The Bob's Burgers Movie was released on Blu-ray, DVD, and Ultra HD Blu-ray on July 19, 2022, by 20th Century Studios Home Entertainment. Bonus features on the Blu-ray releases include an audio commentary track, deleted scenes, a behind-the-scenes featurette, and the animated short My Butt Has a Fever.

The film was released digitally on July 12, 2022, for purchase on premium video-on-demand (PVOD) platforms and for streaming on Hulu and HBO Max in the United States. The releases followed a deal reached between Disney and WarnerMedia in December 2021, under which most upcoming films from 20th Century Studios would be distributed across Disney+, HBO Max, and Hulu until HBO's 2012 deal with 20th Century Studios, signed before Disney's acquisition of the company, expired at the end of 2022. The film became available on Disney+ under its Star hub in Canada on July 12, followed by Crave on November 12. It was released in Europe, excluding Poland due to a distribution deal between 20th Century Studios and Canal+ Poland, as well as in the Middle East and Africa, on July 13. In Latin America, it became available on Star+ on July 20. The film was released on Disney+ (under the Star hub) in Canada on July 12, followed by Crave on November 12, and in Europe (excluding Poland, due to a distribution deal with Canal+ Poland for titles from 20th Century Studios), the Middle East, and Africa on July 13, while in Latin America, the film was released on Star+ on July 20.

In the United States, The Bob's Burgers Movie placed No. 1 on Fandango at Home's weekly digital sales and rental chart for the week ending July 27, following its premium digital release on July 12. On physical media, the film ranked fifth overall and third on the Blu-ray Disc chart for the week ending July 23, selling approximately 56% as many copies as the top-ranked title, according to Circana's VideoScan tracking service, which compiles DVD and Blu-ray sales. Nielsen Media Research, which records streaming viewership on certain American television screens, reported that The Bob's Burgers Movie was the fifth most-streamed film during the week of July 11–17, with 431 million minutes viewed. The following week, between July 18–24, the film recorded 183 million minutes of watch time, placing ninth.

== Reception ==
=== Box office ===
The Bob's Burgers Movie grossed $32 million in North America, and $2.2 million in other territories, for a worldwide total of $34.2 million.

In North America, the film was released alongside Top Gun: Maverick, and was projected to gross $10–15 million from 3,400 theaters in its opening weekend. The film made $5.7 million on its first day, including $1.5 million from Thursday night previews. It went on to debut at $12.4 million (and $14.8 million over the four-day Memorial Day frame), finishing third at the box office. The film stayed in the box office top ten until its sixth weekend.

Outside the U.S. and Canada, the film earned $700,000 from 54 international markets in its opening weekend. It made $400,000 from eight markets in its second weekend.

Bouchard acknowledged that the film's budget had not been formally disclosed and stated on Twitter that its production was $38 million. The film's box office earnings performed well in its own terms: Forbes highlighted that it earned $15 million in its first four days, despite expecting to earn $10 million at most. Deadline noted that around 1.1 million people watched it over its first weekend, comparable to the 1.3 million weekly regular viewers of the television series, and described the film as niche.

=== Critical response ===
On the review aggregator website Rotten Tomatoes, 87% of 147 critics' reviews are positive, with an average rating of 7/10. The website's consensus reads: "The Bob's Burgers Movie offers all the heart, humor, and clever callbacks that fans of the show will be looking for while remaining an entertaining entry point for the unconverted." Metacritic, which uses a weighted average, assigned the film a score of 75 out of 100, based on 36 critics, indicating "generally favorable" reviews. Audiences polled by CinemaScore gave the film an average grade of "A" on an A+ to F scale, while PostTrak reported 89% of audience members gave it a positive score, with 69% saying they would definitely recommend it.

=== Accolades ===
Award	Date of ceremony	Category	Recipient(s)	Result	Ref.
Hollywood Music in Media Awards	November 16, 2022	Best Original Song in an Animated Film	Loren Bouchard and Nora Smith ("Sunny Side Up Summer")	Nominated	
Golden Trailer Awards	June 29, 2023	Best Digital – Animation / Family	"Hits" (The Refinery)	Nominated	

== Possible sequel ==
Before the film's release, screenwriters Loren Bouchard and Nora Smith expressed interest in making a sequel film. The principal cast, including Benjamin, Schaal, Roberts, Mirman, and Mintz, have also expressed interest in a sequel on the film's commentary.
