= John Roberts (actor) =

American actor (born 1971)

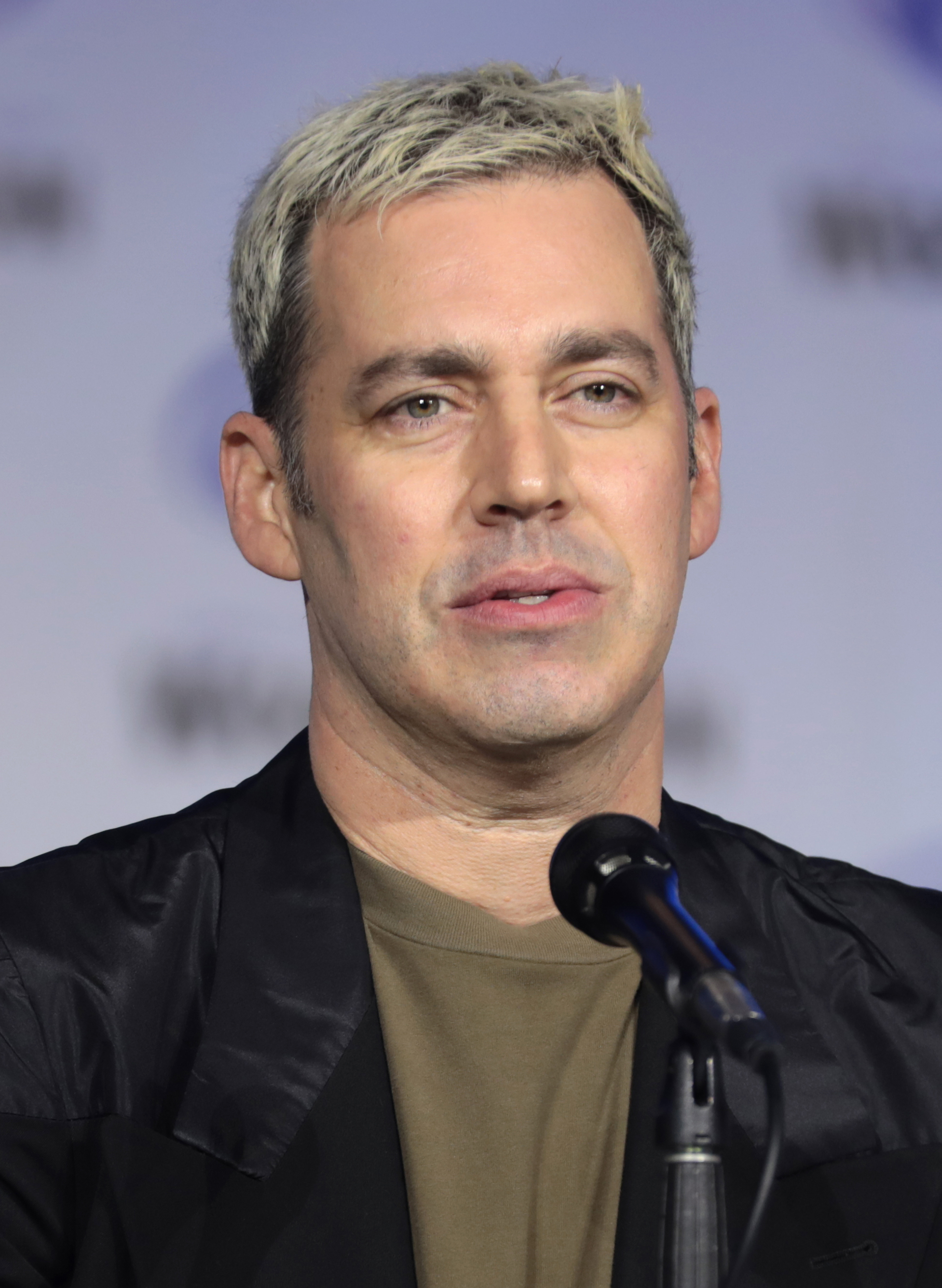
- Roberts in 2022
- Born: Brooklyn, New York, U.S.
- Occupations: Actor; comedian; writer
- Years active: 2006–present

John Roberts is an American actor, comedian, and writer who voices Linda Belcher on the animated sitcom Bob's Burgers.

== Career ==
Roberts currently voices Linda, the doting matriarch of the Belcher family, in the Fox animated primetime comedy Bob's Burgers. He has said in interviews that he based the voice of Linda on that of his own mother, Marge.

He has appeared several times on NBC's Late Night with Jimmy Fallon and Watch What Happens Live!, has co-written a pilot for MTV with Bob Odenkirk and performed in two national tours for Margaret Cho as well as her Showtime special. Roberts first gained attention as one of the standout performer/writers on the YouTube follow up "Jackie & Debra" which won The Comedy Smalls award in London. He has over 20 million hits on YouTube and has made videos with the likes of Debbie Harry and David Cross. He performs several times a year at NYC's Joe's Pub and has signed a publishing deal with French Kiss Records.

On May 17, 2019, Roberts released the song "Looking". The freelance writer Randall Radic wrote that the music video "combines Roberts' love for '80s dance pop music with fluorescent lights, beau coup neon, mannequins, a vintage phone, and a studded leather jacket".

== Personal life ==
Roberts is gay. He is of half-Italian and half-Irish descent.

== Filmography ==
=== Film ===
Year	Title	Role	Notes
2014	Pact		Short
2016	Paint It Black	D	uncredited
2022	My Butt Has a Fever	Linda Belcher	Short
2022	The Bob's Burgers Movie	Linda Belcher, Jocelyn	
2022	Fire Island	Pat	
2024	Stress Positions	Leo	

=== Television ===
Year	Title	Role	Notes
2009	Late Night with Jimmy Fallon	Jimmy's Mom (uncredited)	Episode: #1.44
2011–present	Bob's Burgers	Linda Belcher, Jocelyn	Main role
2012	Eugene!	Johnny Outrageous	TV film
2012–2015	Gravity Falls	Xyler (voice)	3 episodes
2013	Archer	Linda Belcher (voice)	Episode: "Fugue and Riffs"
2013	My Drunk Aunts		TV series
2015	The Awesomes		Episode: "The GayFather"
2015	Comedy Bang! Bang!	Jeff Sleazay	Episode: "Adam Pally Wears a Navy Blazer and Bright Blue Sneakers"
2016	The Mr. Peabody & Sherman Show	Cushions (uncredited)	Episode: "Ruff Guyz/George Crum"
2018, 2022	The Simpsons	Linda Belcher (voice)	Episodes: "My Way or the Highway to Heaven" (2018) "Treehouse of Horror XXXIII" (2022)
2023	The Great North	Bear (voice)	Episode: "A Bear-tiful Find Adventure"
