= Eugene Mirman =

Russian-American actor and comedian (born 1974)

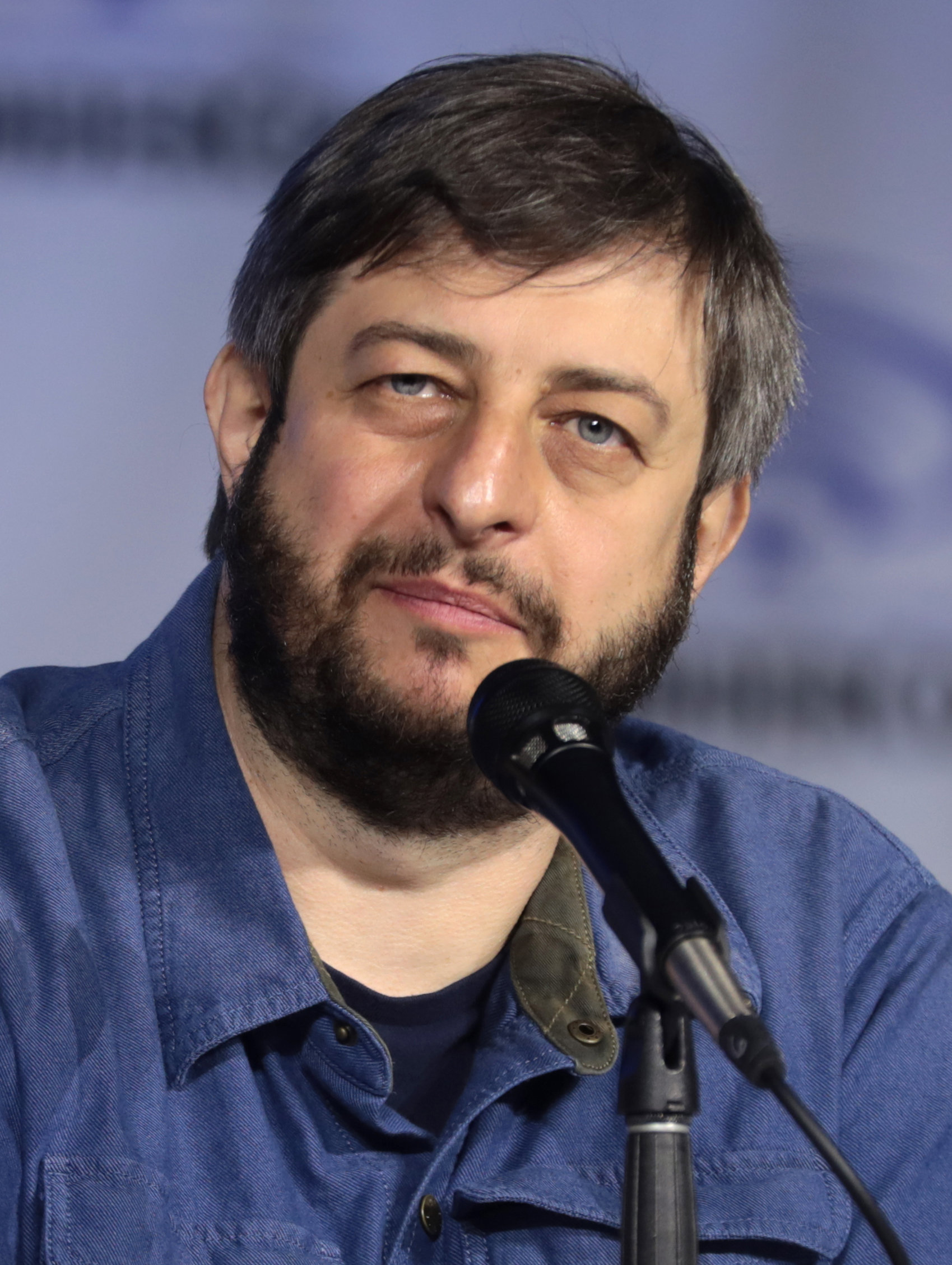
- Mirman at the 2022 WonderCon
- Born: Evgeniy Borisovich Mirman; July 24, 1974 (age 52); Moscow, Russian SFSR, Soviet Union
- Citizenship: United States
- Education: Hampshire College (BA)
- Occupations: Actor; comedian; writer
- Years active: 1991–present
- Spouses: Katie Westfall Tharp (m. 2015; died 2020) Therese Plaehn (m. 2023)
- Children: 1
- Website: eugenemirman.com

Eugene Boris Mirman (born Evgeniy Borisovich Mirman; July 24, 1974) is an American actor, comedian, and writer, known for playing Yvgeny Mirminsky on Delocated and Gene Belcher on the animated comedy Bob's Burgers. He began performing stand-up comedy in the late 1990s and has released multiple comedy albums. In addition to his television work, Mirman has appeared in various film, radio, and podcast productions.

== Early life ==
Mirman was born Evgeniy Borisovich Mirman (Russian: Евгений Борисович Мирман) on July 24, 1974, in Moscow, Russia, when the country was part of the Soviet Union, to Boris Mirman, a Latvian Jew, and Marina, a Russian Jew. His father was a civil engineer. His family immigrated to the United States when he was four years old, and settled in Lexington, Massachusetts, where Mirman attended William Diamond Middle School and Lexington High School. After arriving in the United States, his name was anglicized, his first name being changed to its English form, Eugene, and his patronymic Borisovich being shortened to simply Boris.

Mirman is a graduate of Hampshire College in Western Massachusetts. As part of the college's "design your own major" program, Mirman graduated with a Bachelor of Arts in comedy, with a one-hour routine as his thesis. He returned to his high school to deliver its 2009 commencement address. He returned to Hampshire to deliver the 2012 commencement speech as well.

== Career ==
=== Stand-up ===
In 2004, Mirman released The Absurd Nightclub Comedy of Eugene Mirman, a CD/DVD on Suicide Squeeze Records. The album was voted one of the Best Albums of 2004 by both The A.V. Club and Time Out New York. His second album, En Garde, Society was released by Sub Pop in 2006. Three years later, Mirman released another comedy album, God Is a Twelve-Year-Old Boy with Asperger's, which was recorded in Chicago at the Lakeshore Theatre. In 2012, Mirman released An Evening of Comedy in a Fake, Underground Laboratory.

Mirman has appeared at the U.S. Comedy Arts Festival in Aspen, Colorado, the Just for Laughs Festival in Montreal, Bumbershoot and South by Southwest. He co-produced the weekly standup-variety show Invite Them Up with Bobby Tisdale and Holly Schlesinger, which won a Nightlife Award. Guests included the comedians Mike Birbiglia, Aziz Ansari, David Cross, and Chelsea Peretti. He produced Pretty Good Friends (formerly Tearing the Veil of Maya) at Union Hall in Park Slope, Brooklyn with Julie Smith, which has been voted the best comedy night in New York City by New York Magazine. Similar to comedians David Cross and Patton Oswalt, Mirman often performs in rock clubs and theaters as opposed to traditional comedy clubs. Often touring the US, Mirman occasionally opens for the comedy troupe Stella (former members of The State). He has opened for various bands such as The Shins and toured with Robyn Hitchcock, Modest Mouse, Yo La Tengo, Gogol Bordello, Andrew Bird, and Cake. In 2012, Mirman stated that opening for musicians is uncommon and that music concerts pay three times that of a comedy gig. Mirman also toured with Patton Oswalt, Brian Posehn and Maria Bamford on the Comedians of Comedy tour. He has toured as an opener for the comedy duo Flight of the Conchords and was a regular actor on their HBO series, and he also toured with Andy Kindler and Marc Maron in Stand Uppity.

In January 2010, Mirman performed standup comedy on John Oliver's New York Stand-Up Show on Comedy Central.

Mirman's Eugene Mirman Comedy Festival ran for 10 years from 2008 to 2017.

On April 10, 2015, Mirman filmed a live stand-up special in Tucson, Arizona, directed by Bobcat Goldthwait. The special was released on Netflix in 2015 as Eugene Mirman: Vegan on His Way to the Complain Store.

=== Television ===
Mirman has appeared on several TV shows, including Late Night with Conan O'Brien, HBO's Flight of the Conchords as the character Eugene, the BBC's Russell Howard's Good News, Comedy Central Presents, Delocated, Aqua Teen Hunger Force, Comedy Central's Premium Blend, VH1, Third Watch, Cartoon Network's Home Movies, Cheap Seats, Lucy, the Daughter of the Devil and more. He also played a spokes-potato on Food Network.

In 2010, Mirman co-starred with Phill Jupitus in the Dave TV movie Comedy Exchange. In late 2010, Mirman performed on the Comedy Central show The Benson Interruption.

On February 21, 2011, Mirman appeared on The Colbert Report as a fertility clown. On April 4, 2013, Mirman provided the voice for Cecil Tunt, multi-millionaire brother of Cheryl/Carol Tunt on FX's Archer. On March 13, 2016, Mirman appeared on Last Week Tonight as a hacker.

Mirman voices the character Gene Belcher on the Fox animated series Bob's Burgers.

Mirman was a guest voice as Emperor Keith Merman in the Netflix original The Adventures of Puss in Boots. Mirman voices the character Burger on the animated show Apple & Onion.

=== Radio and podcasts ===
In January 2009, Mirman released a satirical self-help book entitled The Will to Whatevs.

He often appears on StarTalk Radio, hosted by Neil deGrasse Tyson. He has also appeared several times on the TV adaptation.

Mirman guest starred as an "Expert witness" on humorist John Hodgman's podcast Judge John Hodgman.

Mirman appeared on Ken Reid's TV Guidance Counselor Podcast on April 24, 2015. The episode was recorded live as part of the 2015 Eugene Mirman Comedy Festival in Boston.

Mirman plays a supporting role of Benny the gerbil on the children's podcast This Podcast Has Fleas in 2017.

Mirman hosted his own podcast, Hold On with Eugene Mirman, in 2017–18.

== Personal life ==
On September 7, 2015, Mirman wed his longtime partner Katie Westfall-Tharp (1980–2020). She was a set decorator who worked on such productions as Inside Amy Schumer and Human Giant. The two remained married until Westfall-Tharp's death from cancer on January 29, 2020. They have one son, born in 2016. In 2023, Mirman married actress Therese Plaehn.

On March 31, 2026, he was involved in a car crash in Bedford, New Hampshire, and hospitalized with major injuries. A veteran state trooper assigned to New Hampshire Governor Kelly Ayotte's security detail pulled Mirman from the car. Eyewitnesses and bystanders, including Ayotte, assisted in the recovery and administered first aid to Mirman. The toll plaza where the crash occurred has a long history of serious vehicle accidents.

== Discography ==
- The Absurd Nightclub Comedy of Eugene Mirman (2004)
- Invite Them Up (2005)
- En Garde, Society! (2006)
- Comedians of Comedy 3" Tour CD (2006)
- God Is a Twelve-Year-Old Boy with Asperger's (2009)
- An Evening of Comedy In a Fake Underground Laboratory (2012)
- I'm Sorry (You're Welcome) (2015)
- Here Comes The Whimsy (2026)

== Filmography ==
=== Film ===
| Year | Title | Role | Notes |
|---|---|---|---|
| 2009 | Impolex | Talking Octopus | Voice actor |
| 2020 | It Started as a Joke | Himself | Documentary about the final year of the Eugene Mirman Comedy Festival |
| 2022 | My Butt Has a Fever | Gene Belcher | Voice actor; short film |
| 2022 | The Bob's Burgers Movie | Gene Belcher | Voice actor |
| 2022 | Confess, Fletch | Marv, Yacht Club Security Guard | |

=== Television ===
| Year | Title | Role | Notes |
|---|---|---|---|
| 1999, 2004 | Home Movies | Eugene (voice) | 2 episodes |
| 2002 | Third Watch | Bernie Foy | Episode: "Firestarter" |
| 2004 | Comedy Lab | Eugene | Episode: "12:21" |
| 2004–2006 | Cheap Seats | Answer Dog / Cheap Correspondent | 5 episodes |
| 2006–2015 | Aqua Teen Hunger Force | Dr. Eugene Mirman / Dr. Gene Belcher / Abortion Doctor (voice) | 5 episodes |
| 2007 | Lucy, the Daughter of the Devil | Special Sister / various (voice) | 10 episodes |
| 2007–2009 | Flight of the Conchords | Eugene | 12 episodes |
| 2009–2012 | Delocated | Yvgeny Mirminsky | 27 episodes |
| 2010 | John Oliver's New York Stand-Up Show | Himself | 1 episode |
| 2011–present | Bob's Burgers | Gene Belcher (voice) | Main role |
| 2013–2017 | Archer | Cecil Tunt (voice) | 7 episodes |
| 2015 | Inside Amy Schumer | Steve | Episode: "Foam" |
| 2016 | Broad City | Zed | Episode: "Rat Pack" |
| 2016 | The Adventures of Puss in Boots | Emperor Merman (voice) | Episode: "Cat Fish" |
| 2016 | Last Week Tonight with John Oliver | Gary | Episode: "Encryption" |
| 2018 | Crashing | Himself | Episode: "Too Good" |
| 2018 | The Simpsons | Gene Belcher (voice) | Episode: "My Way or the Highway to Heaven" |
| 2018–2021 | Apple & Onion | Burger (voice) | 14 episodes |
| 2020 | Central Park | Bodyguard (voice) | Episode: "Rival Busker" |
| 2022 | The Boys Presents: Diabolical | Denis Fletcher (voice) | Episode: "An Animated Short Where Pissed-Off Supes Kill Their Parents" |
| 2022 | Would I Lie to You? (US) | Himself | Episode: "Criminal Bear" |
| 2023 | Teenage Euthanasia | Vladislav (voice) | 2 episodes |
| 2024 | Last Week Tonight with John Oliver | Butternut Squash (voice) | Episode: "Medicaid" |

== Bibliography ==
- The Will to Whatevs (2009)
