= Dan Mintz =

American actor, comedian and writer

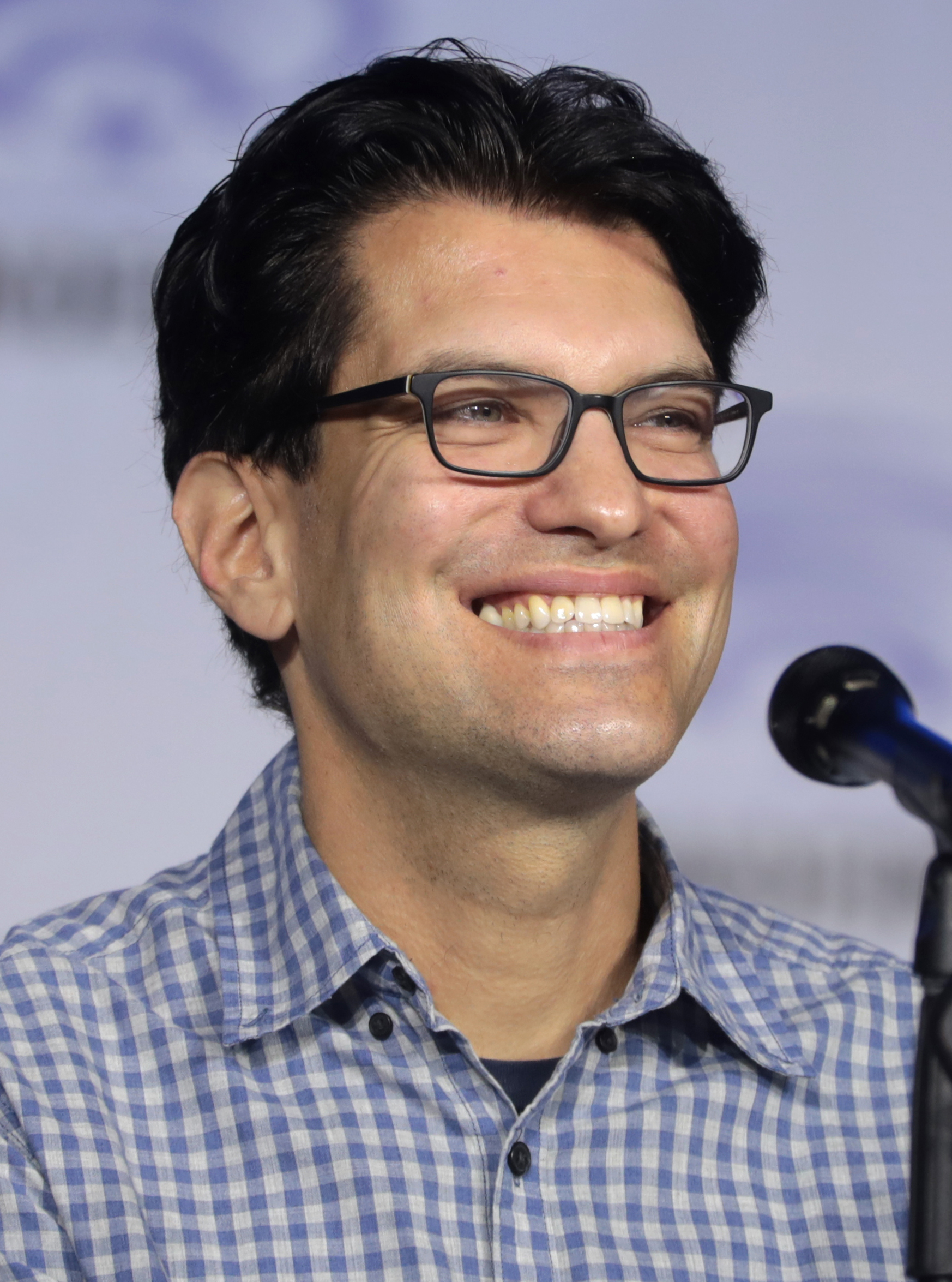
- Mintz at the 2022 WonderCon
- Born: Daniel Alexander Mintz; September 25, 1981 (age 45); Anchorage, Alaska, U.S.
- Occupations: Actor; comedian; writer
- Years active: 2002–present
- Spouse: Margie Kment (m. 2011)
- Children: 2
- Website: danmintz.com

Daniel Alexander Mintz (born September 25, 1981) is an American actor, comedian, and writer. He is best known for his role as Bob and Linda Belcher's oldest daughter, Tina, on the animated show Bob's Burgers. As a comedian, he is known for his extremely deadpan delivery, keeping his eyes fixed straight ahead and never looking toward the camera or audience due to natural stage fright.

== Early life and education ==
Born to a Jewish family, Mintz grew up in Anchorage, Alaska. He is a graduate of Harvard University, where he wrote for The Harvard Lampoon.

== Career ==
He landed his first writing job at Comedy Central's Crank Yankers, then worked on Last Call with Carson Daly. He has written for The Andy Milonakis Show, Human Giant, Lucky Louie, Important Things with Demetri Martin, Jon Benjamin Has a Van, Nick Swardson's Pretend Time, Nathan for You, Veep, The Awesomes and Mulaney. His writing credits also include the Bob's Burgers episode titled "The Equestranauts".

On May 16, 2007, Mintz appeared on Late Night with Conan O'Brien. His standup appeared on the compilation CD Comedy Death-Ray, and a special for Comedy Central Presents aired on March 28, 2008. In February 2013, he performed standup on Late Show with David Letterman. He recorded a standup album, The Stranger, at Comedy Works in Denver in July 2013. The album was released in 2014 through Comedy Central Records.

== Personal life ==
Mintz resides in Los Angeles, California. Mintz married fellow comedian Margie Kment on May 29, 2011. They have two children.

== Filmography ==
Key
†	Denotes works that have not yet been released

=== Film ===
Year	Title	Role	Notes
2022	My Butt Has a Fever	Tina Belcher (voice)	Short film
2022	The Bob's Burgers Movie	Tina Belcher (voice)	Film debut

=== Television ===
Year	Title	Role	Notes
2007–2008	Human Giant	—N/a	Consultant writer; 14 episodes
2008	Comedy Central Presents	Himself	Episode: "Dan Mintz"
2011–present	Bob's Burgers	Tina Belcher (voice)	Main role
2013–2014	Nathan for You	—N/a	Writer; 16 episodes
2013–2016	Adventure Time	T.V. (voice)	3 episodes
2014	Mulaney	Mintz (live-action)	Episode: "Halloween"
2015	The Awesomes	Vasquez/Bystander #4/additional (voice)	4 episodes
2017	Son of Zorn	Sanitation Solutions Spokesperson	Episode: "All Hail Son of Zorn"
2017	Silicon Valley	Dana	Episode: "Chief Operating Officer"
2017	The Simpsons	Tina Belcher (voice)	Episode: "My Way or the Highway to Heaven"
2017	Speechless	Randy	Episode: "S-P-Special B-Boy T-I-Time"
2019	The Goldbergs	Mr. Goulding	Episode: "8-bit Goldbergs"
2019	Veep	—N/a	Consulting producer; 1 episode ("South Carolina")
2020	Indebted	—N/a	Consulting producer; 11 episodes

=== Writer ===
Year	Title	Notes
2020	Indebted	2 episodes
