= O loupežníku Rumcajsovi =

- Written by: Václav Čtvrtek, Anna Jurásková, Milan Nápravník, Irena Povejšilová
- Directed by: Ladislav Čapek
- Starring: Karel Höger, Eduard Cupák
- Composer: Václav Lídl
- Country of origin: Czechoslovakia
- Original language: Czech
- No. of seasons: 3
- No. of episodes: 39

Production
- Running time: 7 minutes

Original release
- Network: Czechoslovak Television
- Release: 5 November 1967 – 16 November 1984

O loupežníku Rumcajsovi is a Czech animated television series by writer Václav Čtvrtek and illustrator Radek Pilař. Series is about the robber Rumcajs who lives in the Řáholec forest near Jičín. Series was created and premiered in three seasons, the first in 1967 and 1968, the second in 1969 and 1970, both voiced by Karel Höger, and the third in 1984, voiced by Eduard Cupák. All three series have a total of 39 episodes. In 1972, thirteen episodes of spin off series O loupežnickém synku Cipískovi were filmed with the character of the robber Rumcajs, In English Version, it was broadcast as The Robber Name Rumcajs on BBC in U.K. and PBS in U.S.

== Plot ==
The robber Rumcajs was originally a shoemaker from Jičín, and the mayor of Jičín, Humpál, also had his shoes made by him. However, Rumcajs disagreed with the mayor and was expelled from the city for this. He settled in the Řáholec forest, where he made a living as a robber. He lives here together with his wife Manka and son Cipísek, with whom he experiences many adventures, because the Jičín estate wants to get them out of the forest. In these works, Rumcajs appears as a positive hero who fights against the authorities.

== Characters ==
=== Main ===
- Rumcajs
- Manka
- Cipísek (since episode 26)

=== Supporting ===
- Mayor Humpál
- Magistrate Navrátek
- knížepán
- kněžna
- obr Rabiják
- vodník Česílko

== Episodes ==
1. Jak se švec Rumcajs stal loupežníkem
2. Jak Rumcajs přechytračil knížepána
3. Jak Rumcajs vychoval čtyři pěničky
4. Jak dal Rumcajs Mance sluneční prstýnek
5. Jak Rumcajs loupil jablko
6. Kousky dona Mirákla
7. Jak Rumcajs překejchal generála
8. Jak Rumcajs pro kukačku pad málem do vězení
9. Jak Rumcajs dělal tancmajstra
10. Jak měl Rumcajs patálii s drakem
11. Jak Rumcajs hledal špunt od rybníka
12. Jak Rumcajs upad do okovů
13. Jak Rumcajse přivedly boty k poctivosti
14. Jak se Rumcajs dal znovu na loupežničinu
15. Jak Rumcajs kočíroval sumce Holdegrona
16. Jak Rumcajs osolil knížepánovi zelí
17. Jak Rumcajs léčil kukačku
18. Jak Rumcajs s obrem štípali o Řáholec dříví
19. Jak myslivec Muška pásl včely
20. Jak Rumcajs vydobyl Manku na svobodu
21. Jak Rumcajs pomáhal Kubovi z vojny
22. Jak Rumcajs stonal a zase se uzdravil
23. Kterak Rumcajs zatopil pod kotlem
24. Jak se stal Rumcajs na hodinu císařpánem
25. O vodnickým kolovrátku
26. Jak se Rumcajs nakonec vrátil k poctivosti
27. Jak šel Rumcajs pro mašličkovou sponku
28. Jak Cipísek chránil jelení studánku
29. Jak šel Rumcajs do Kartouz pro včely
30. Jak Rumcajs vyspravil císařskou silnici
31. Jak šel Cipísek do Jičína pro chleba
32. Jak se Rumcajs podruhé potkal s Rabijákem
33. Jak měl Rumcajs velkou starost o Manku
34. Jak chtěl jít Cipísek do světa
35. Jak Rumcajs vysadil duhu do nebe
36. Jak Rumcajs vyhnal z Řáholce dubové mužíky
37. Jak se Rumcajs postaral o věžovou bránu
38. Jak knížepán za sebe poslal nájemníka
39. Jak si Cipísek střelil pro sluneční prstýnek
