= Czechoslovakia–Norway relations =

Czechoslovak-Norwegian relations
- Czechoslovakia: Norway

Czechoslovakia–Norway relations refers to the foreign relations between Norway and the now-defunct state Czechoslovakia.

== Up to World War I ==
Norway was an independent country since 1905, at the dissolution of the union between Norway and Sweden in 1905. Czechoslovakia became independent from the Austro-Hungarian Empire in 1918.

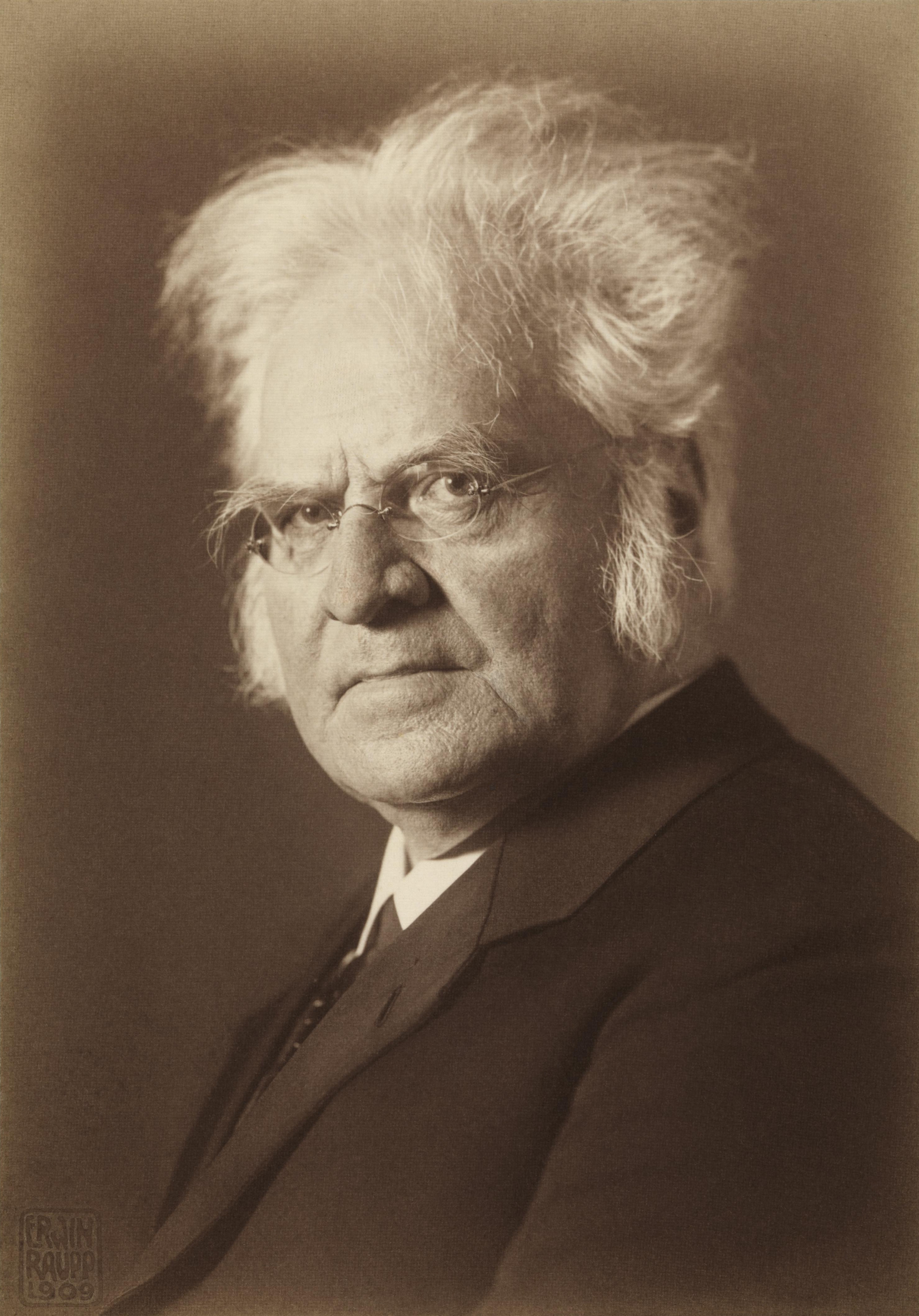
Bjørnstjerne Bjørnson

The Norwegian poet, playwright and political agitator Bjørnstjerne Bjørnson was a vocal defender of Slovak rights in the Austro-Hungarian Empire in his later life, in 1907 and 1908. He died in 1910. The engagement was sparked by the Černová tragedy. Streets by the name Björnsonova have been named after Bjørnson in Bratislava, Prešov and Nové Zámky.

== Interwar period ==
Both countries were founding members of the League of Nations.

On 11 March 1937 in Oslo, Czechoslovakia and Norway signed a cultural cooperation treaty. The people who closed the agreement include Emil Franke, Halvdan Koht and Nils Hjelmtveit. According to Hjelmtveit, it was the first treaty of its kind signed by Norway. Olav Rytter was the main translator at the negotiations and signing. The first large result of the treaty was an exhibition of Czech and Slovak books at the Norwegian Museum of Decorative Arts and Design in April 1938. A planned Norwegian exhibition in Prague in the autumn of 1938 was not held because of the events surrounding the Munich Agreement.

== World War II ==
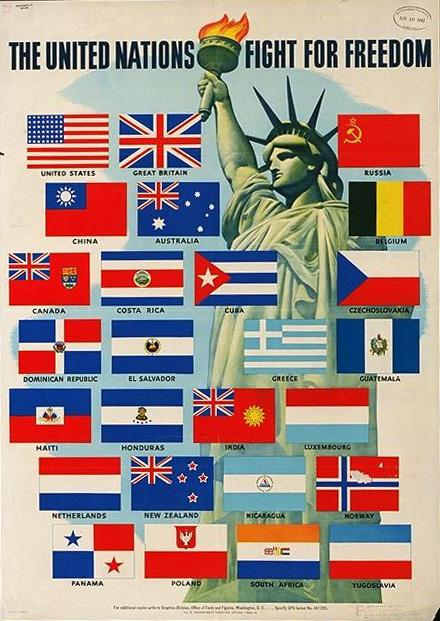
Wartime poster for the United Nations, created in 1942 by the U.S. Office of War Information, showing the 26 members of the alliance

Czechoslovakia was annexed by Germany in 1938–1939, and had an anti-German government-in-exile during the Second World War. On 9 April 1940 Norway was invaded by Germany too, and joined the Allies of World War II with its government fleeing the country. The alliance was formalised in the Declaration by United Nations on 1 January 1942, with Czechoslovakia and Norway as signatories.

During the war, the two exiled governments were headquartered in London. On 8 December every year, the birthday of Bjørnstjerne Bjørnson, the two governments held Czechoslovakia–Norwegian festivities, in spirit of the cultural cooperation treaty. Olav Rytter was stationed in London as well. He made a career as a Slavic philologist, and after the war he served from 1948 to 1953 as Director of the United Nations Information Office in Prague.

== Cold War ==
The Czechoslovak coup d'état of 1948 took place on 25 February 1948. Joseph Stalin soon tried to pressure Norway to sign a treaty of mutual assistance. The coup also affected Norwegian interior politics. On 29 February 1948 Prime Minister Einar Gerhardsen held the Kråkerøy Speech in which he denounced the Communist Party of Norway as possible supporters of a Czechoslovak-like coup d'état in Norway. The Communist Party supported the Czechoslovak coup d'état. Shortly after Gerhardsen's speech, at least 1,500 people demonstrated in Oslo against the coup. Norway joined the NATO in 1949.

During the Cold War, the Czechoslovak intelligence StB spied in Norway as an instrument of the KGB, and the Norwegian Intelligence Service spied in Czechoslovakia as an instrument for the Central Intelligence Agency. In both cases, the intelligence service of the small nation was used because it was less conspicuous than the intelligence service of the superpower. The StB was interested in informants from the Czechoslovak diaspora, from people involved with NATO and from politicians in the Norwegian Labour Party and from 1961 the Socialist People's Party. Among the people convicted as spies, was the Czechoslovak former media celebrity Vladimír Veselý. He was sentenced to 25 years of prison in 1957. Veselý had allegedly had contact with Norwegian intelligence officer Einar Nord Stenersen, who had been dispatched to the Norwegian embassy in 1954.

=== Cold War cultural exchange ===
Norwegian puppeteer Birgit Strøm married Czechoslovak diplomat Jan Bureš in the early 1950s. Bureš was summoned back to Czechoslovakia for marrying a westerner, and even though Strøm followed him to Prague, the marriage was dissolved. Both Bureš and Strøm were surveilled by StB. Strøm returned to Norway, but had made lasting bonds with the Czech puppeteering scene. Some emigrated to Norway, including Karel Hlavatý who is known for physically crafting Strøm's puppet character Titten Tei. For having contacts in an Eastern European country, Strøm was also extensively surveilled by Norwegian intelligence.

The Norwegian Broadcasting Corporation, for many years the only television channel in Norway, imported a fair amount of Czech television, especially children's shows. Recurring shows include Zdeněk Miler's series about Mole (Norwegian: Muldvarpen, "The Mole"), Beneš and Jiránek's Pat & Mat (Norwegian: To Gode Naboer, "Two Good Neighbours"), Beneš' Jája a Pája (Norwegian: Jaja og Paja, "Jaja and Paja") and Čtvrtek and Pilař's Cipísek.

Preußler and Smetana's Malá čarodějnice (Norwegian: Den vesle heksa, "The Little Witch") from the mid-1980s was a Czechoslovak-German production. The Czechoslovak-German film from 1973, Tři oříšky pro Popelku, was first aired in Norway in 1975 and has been aired on 24 December every year since 1987 except for 1993 and 1995. The Norwegian version features a single, overdubbed voice (male Knut Risan) for the narrator and all characters which is uncommon in Norwegian television.

Norwegians who were decorated for contributions to Czechoslovak culture include Kjell Bækkelund, who received the Janáček Medal.

== See also ==
- Foreign relations of Czechoslovakia
- Foreign relations of Norway
