= Betthupferl =

Austrian children's television series

- Country of origin: Austria

Production
- Running time: 5 minutes

Original release
- Network: ORF
- Release: 1965 – 1989

Betthupferl was a children's programming block produced and broadcast by the ORF from the mid-1960s until 1989.

It often cartoons or puppet shows from various countries such as Barbapapa, Wil Cwac Cwac, Hector's House, The Adventures of the Mouse on Mars, and Famille Petz (with Pezibär).

== See also ==
- List of Austrian television series
- Wieczorynka
- TV Maci
- Sandmännchen
- Leka nosht, deca
- Večerníček
