= List of children's programmes broadcast by the ORF =

This is a list of children's programmes that currently are, or formerly were, broadcast by the ORF in Austria.

== Current programming ==
- 1, 2 oder 3 (with ZDF) (1977-present)
- The Adventures of Marco & Gina (2002-present)
- Fushigi no Kuni no Alice (1980s-present)
- ABC Bär (2013-present)
- Dora (2025-present)
- Hallo okidoki (2014-present)
- Maya the Bee (1976-present)
- Schmatzo (2013-present)
- The Kasperl franchise (including Famille Petz) (1957-present)
- ZIB Zack Mini

== Former programming ==
- Betthupferl (1960s-1988)
  - Barbapapa (1975-2014)
  - Hector's House (1968-1977)
  - Wil Cwac Cwac (1987)
