= Rumcajs =

Fictional character created by Václav Čtvrtek

Rumcajs

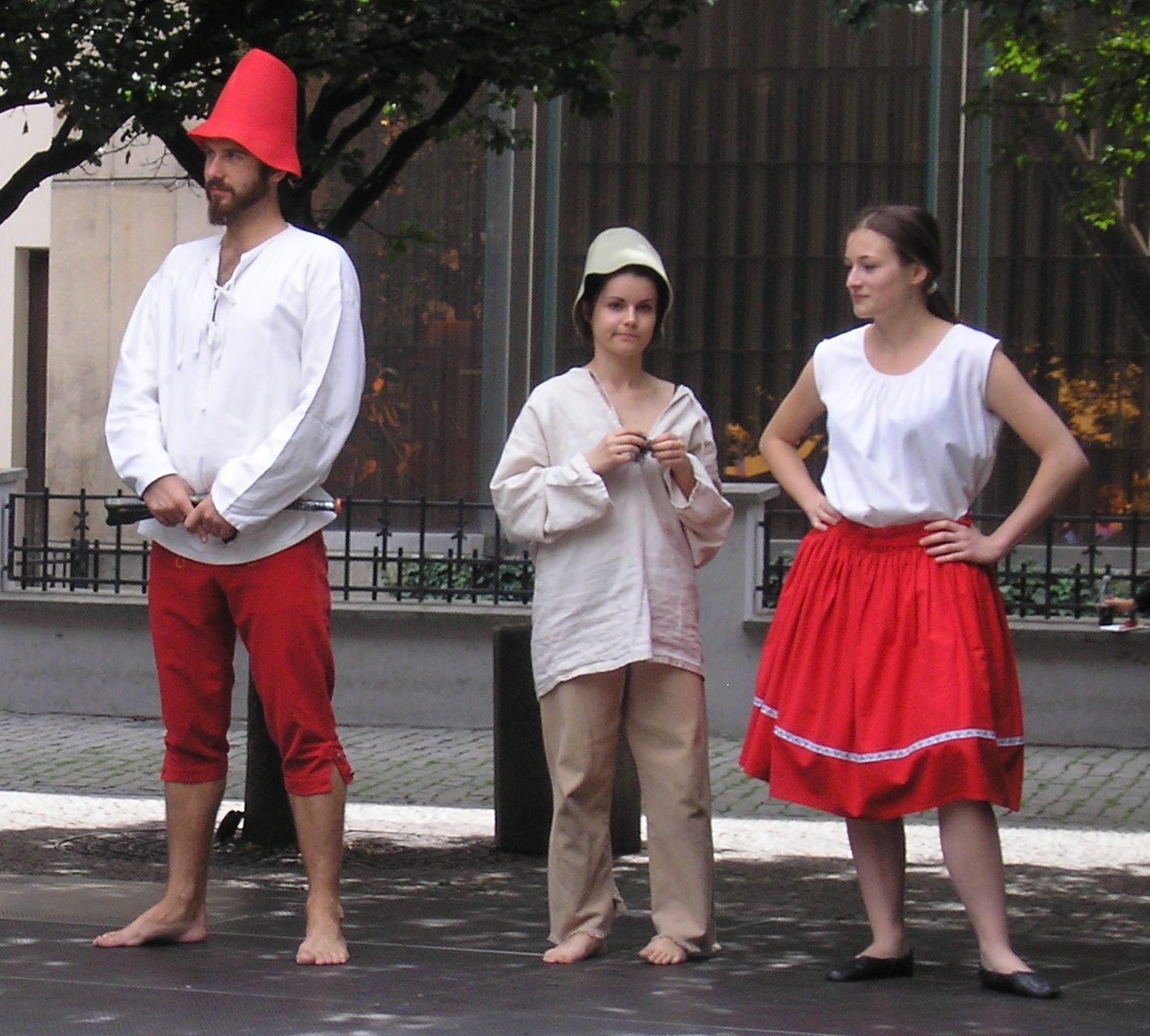
Rumcajs, Cipísek and Manka, a performance in the Old Town Square, Prague

Gallant robber Rumcajs (Czech: Loupežník Rumcajs, [ˈrumtsajs]), his wife Manka, and their son, little robber Cipísek ['tsɪpiːsɛk] are fictional characters popularized by two children's animated television series broadcast as part of the Večerníček TV program in Czechoslovakia from 1967 to 1984, 52 episodes in total. The series were designed by Czech writer Václav Čtvrtek and artist Radek Pilař. These stories were also published in book form.

== Setting and fictional character biography ==
Rumcajs was a cobbler in Jičín and had to make shoes for the town mayor Humpál. Humpál was proud of his big feet, but Rumcajs brags that he had seen larger ones, and Humpál expels him to the (fictional) Řáholec forest "for the insult of mayor's feet", so Rumcajs becomes a Robin Hood-like brigand. Rumcajs settled in a cave in the forest and gained his signature attributes: a tall red hat, a beard with a bee swarm, and a pistol loaded with acorns. The opponents of Rumcajs include the mayor, the prince, the princess, their lackey, and even the Emperor. His helpers include his family, animals, and forest and water spirits.

Although the time of the events is never explicitly stated in the stories, from several mentions of "Král Fricek" (King Frederick William IV of Prussia), one may assume the mid-19th century. Also, in the book Manka Empress Bětka is mentioned, apparently Empress Elisabeth of Austria, wife of Franz Joseph I.

== Impact and commemoration ==
During 1969–1996 a one-hectare patch of forest, somewhere between Jičín and the villages of Čejkovice of Podhradí municipality, Vokšice, and Šlikova Ves was labelled Řáholec in the local forestry stand map. Initially, this was an inside joke of local foresters, but eventually it went public.

The town of Jičín is proud of this association with the fairy tale and its author. The Václav Čtvrtek Square and a bookstore are named for him, and there is a pub "At Rumcajs'". In 1975, a year before his death, Václav Čtvrtek was declared an honorary citizen of Jičín. In 2011, Jičín children planted a small forest named "Cipískův Řáholeček" [Cipisek's Little Řáholec].

Jičín is the place of the annual festival "Jičín – město pohádky" (Jičín – the Town of the Fairy Tale) established in 1990. The founders of the festival were well aware of the immense popularity of Rumcajs and didn't want to turn the festival into a kind of "Rumcajsland"; therefore, for the first 10 years, little attention was paid to Čtvrtek and his literary heroes. Only in 2011 did organizers make Rumcajs and his authors, Čtvrtek and Pilař, prominent at the festival.

Since 1967, the Jičín branch of the Czech Tourist Club has organized an annual walk across the Bohemian Paradise named "Pilgrimage after Rumcajs". Initially the start of the walk was simultaneous, but due to increased popularity, the start was staggered. Annual participation peaked in 1982, with 10,831 attendees. Since then, participation has varied depending on the weather and holidays. With the collapse of Communism, attendance sharply declined as Czechs gained the right to unrestricted travel abroad, but interest later rebounded, and in 2019, there were 8,907 "pilgrims".

Rumcajs stories became popular in a number of European countries, as well as in Morocco and Chile. At the height of its popularity in the mid-1970s, Rumcajs merchandise, such as Rumcajs dolls, also became highly popular and have been compared to those of Soldier Švejk (another popular Czech fictional character) or even to that of some of Disney's characters. Due to the popularity of Rumcajs stories in Poland, a Polish baby detergent was named after Cipísek.

On April 4, 2011, the hundredth anniversary of Václav Čtvrtek's birth, Rumcajs and Cipísek featured in the Google doodle on the Czech-language Google home page.

A minor character named Rumtzays (Redbeard in the English translation) appears in Blood and Wine, a 2016 expansion pack for The Witcher 3: Wild Hunt.

In 2017, on the occasion of the 50th anniversary of the Rumcajs series, the Czech Mint issued commemorative/collectible coins. The reverse side depicts either Rumcajs, or Manka, or Cipisek, while the obverse shows the attributes of the island country of Niue (which issued the Czech Mint the license to print commemorative coins): country name, the profile of Queen Elizabeth II, year of issue (2017) and the nominal value of 1 NZD (silver coin) or 5 NZD (gold coin).

== Publication history ==
The prototype of Rumcajs may be found in a short story by Čtvrtek published in 1946. Rumcajs, as he is known now, first appeared in the children's magazine Mateřídouška in 1966, but gained major popularity with the release of the TV series.

The Rumcajs stories have been translated into Polish, Bulgarian, German, Hungarian, Romanian, Estonian, Latvian, and Russian. Some of them were translated in English in the magazine Czechoslovak Life in 1987.

=== Cartoons ===
- O loupežníku Rumcajsovi (1967-1984) - The series was released in 3 series 13 episodes each. The first series was black-and-white, later digitally colored. The first two (1967/1968 and 1969/1970) were narrated by Karel Höger (whose name could not appear in the credits at that time), the last one (1984) by Eduard Cupák (cs).
- O loupežnickém synku Cipískovi (1972) - Released in 13 episodes.

=== Books ===
- Rumcajs (1970)
- Jak si Rumcajs poradil s rakem [How Rumcajs Coped with the Crayfish] (1971)
- Rumcajsova loupežnicka knižka [Robber's Book of Rumcajs] (1971)
- Rumcajsova vánočni pohádka [Rumcajs' Christmas Fairy Tale] (1972)
- O Rumcajsovi a loupežnickém synku Cipískovi [About Rumcajs and the Robber's Son Cipísek] (1973)
- Cipísek (1975)
- Manka (1975)
- Jak si Rumcajs poslal Cipiska pro pomoc [How Rumcajs Sent Cipísek for Help] (1978)

=== Audio records ===
Supraphon and Panton released several albums of the adventures of Rumcajs. Two albums were released by Supraphon in German, narrated by Walter Taub:

- 1978: Vom Raholezer Räuber Rumzais und seinem Sohne Zipfelchen
- 1980: Rumzais und Zipfelchen erleben neue Abenteuer

In 2017, on the 50th anniversary of the first Rumcajs TV show, Supraphon released the CD album and audiobook "Rumcajsova loupežnická knížka & Vánoce u Rumcajsů" ["Robber's Book of Ramcajs & Christmas with Rumcajs"] narrated by Vojtěch Kotek, which includes previously unpublished stories found in the writer's archives.
