= Cholenice =

- Municipality
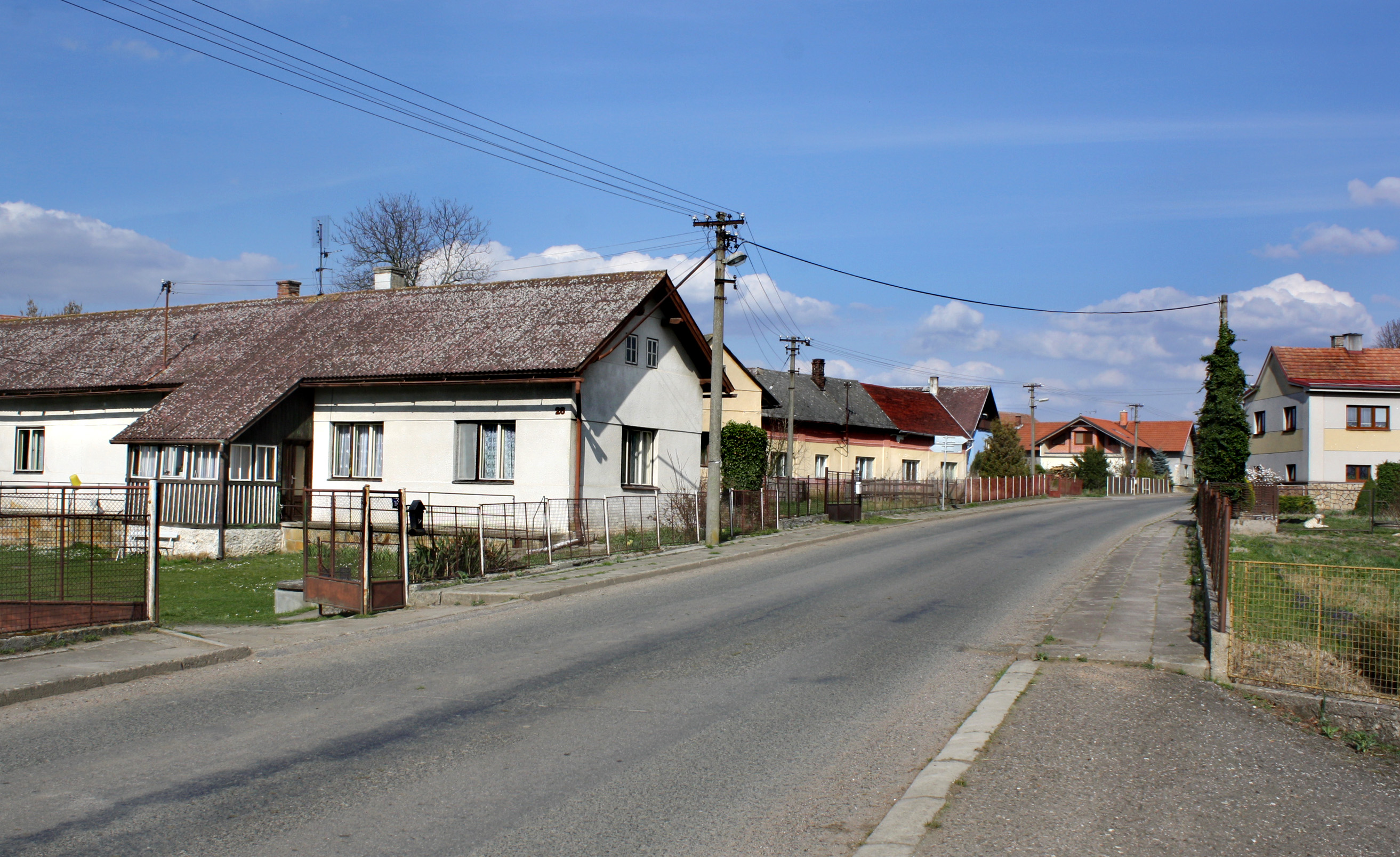
- Main road

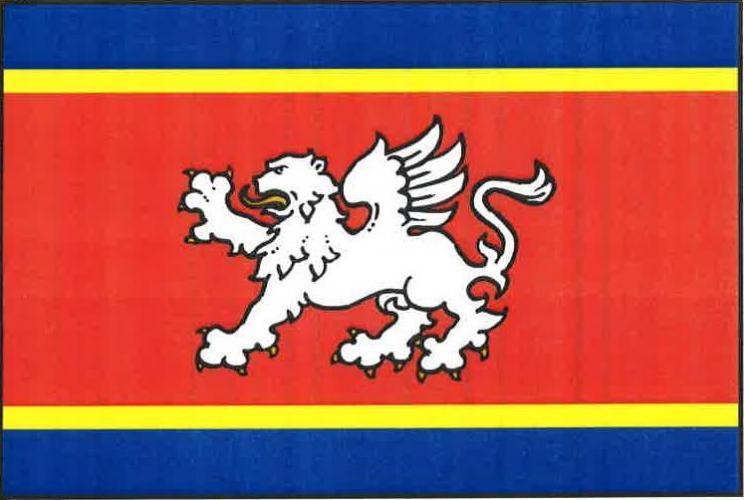
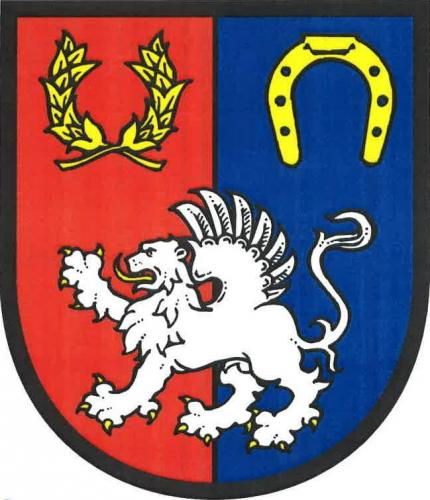
- Flag Coat of arms

- Location in the Czech Republic
- Coordinates: 50°19′29″N 15°16′51″E
- Country: Czech Republic
- Region: Hradec Králové
- District: Jičín
- First mentioned: 1378

Area
  - Total: 4.55 km^{2} (1.76 sq mi)
- Elevation: 235 m (771 ft)

Population (2026-01-01)
  - Total: 211
  - Density: 46.4/km^{2} (120/sq mi)
- Time zone: UTC+1 (CET)
  - Summer (DST): UTC+2 (CEST)
- Postal code: 507 32
- Website: www.cholenice.cz

Cholenice is a municipality and village in Jičín District in the Hradec Králové Region of the Czech Republic. It has about 200 inhabitants.

Cholenice is located 13 km (8 mi) south of Jičín and 60 km (37 mi) northeast of Prague.

== History ==
The first written mention of Cholenice is from 1378.

== Demographics ==
Historical population
Year	Pop.	±%
1869	349	—
1880	398	+14.0%
1890	398	+0.0%
1900	389	−2.3%
1910	438	+12.6%
1921	451	+3.0%
1930	466	+3.3%
1950	356	−23.6%
1961	352	−1.1%
1970	312	−11.4%
1980	252	−19.2%
1991	204	−19.0%
2001	198	−2.9%
2011	221	+11.6%
2021	221	+0.0%
Source: Censuses
