= Ludwig Schübeler =

Norwegian priest (1890–1945)

Ludwig Christian Inniss Schübeler (6 June 1890 – 1945) was a Norwegian priest.

He was born in Fredrikstad. He was a priest in the Norwegian Church Abroad in Leith from 1919 to 1926, then priest in Oslo from 1928. He worked in the East End of Oslo, and there were some protesters when he was suggested as curate in Frogner in 1936. Minister Nils Hjelmtveit ignored the protests and hired Schübeler.

From 1942 to 1945 Schübeler was a member of Den midlertidige kirkeledelse, "the temporary church leadership" because of the German occupation of Norway. He issued the book Kirkekampen slik jeg så den in 1945, and also For sværds egg in 1927, Boken om bispen in 1938 and Finnlands sjel i Finnlands strid in 1940.
