= Večerníček =

Czech and Slovak children's television program

Večerníček (meaning 'little bedtime story' in Czech and Slovak) is a television program for children in the Czech Republic and Slovakia. It has been broadcast regularly for over 60 years. Before the dissolution of Czechoslovakia in 1993, two versions – one in Czech and one in Slovak – were aired in the respective parts of Czechoslovakia. Similar shows in other countries include Sandmännchen in Germany, Esti mese in Hungary, Basme de seară in Romania, Leka nosht, deca in Bulgaria, Wieczorynka in Poland, Telepoiss in Estonia, Betthupferl in Austria and La Calabacita in Cuba.

Currently, Večerníček is aired in the Czech Republic at 18:45 every day, when children are expected to go to bed. The show (opening theme, tale, closing theme) lasts ten minutes at most. Every tale takes 5–8 minutes. A full Večerníček series typically contains 10–20 episodes (with the exceptions of Pat & Mat and Tom and Jerry).

The format of the program has been unchanged for decades, making it part of the Czech and Slovak culture.

== Opening and closing themes ==
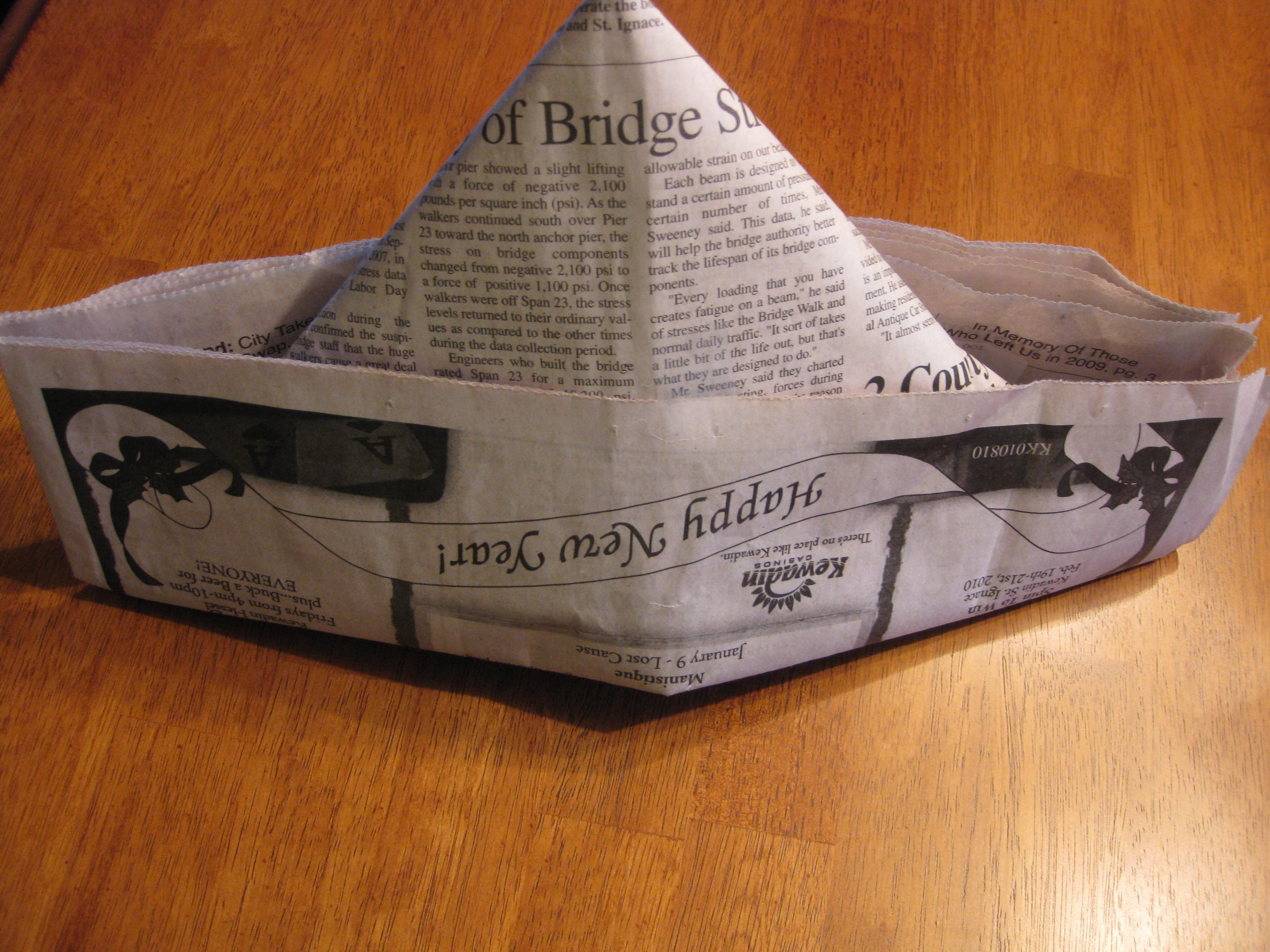
The newspaper hat worn by Večerníček

In the Czech Republic, the program's opening and final themes feature a little boy called Večerníček (a boy wearing a newspaper hat, black t-shirt and orange pants) as he throws paper while walking up stairs and falls. He then rides a rocking horse, which turns into a car and finally a unicycle, before the last sheet of paper, showing the Czech Television logo, lands on the screen as the word "Večerníček" appears. At the beginning of the program, the boy says "Good Evening" (Dobrý večer in Czech) to the children watching; at the end, he says "Good Night" (Dobrou noc). This is the longest-running opening and closing theme ever broadcast in the country. The intro voice-over, recorded by a five-year-old boy named Michal Citavý, has remained unchanged since 1965. The graphics were designed by Radek Pilař (the animation provided by Bratri v Triku, an animation company of Kratky Film Prague) and the music was provided by Ladislav Simon.

In Slovakia, the program's opening and final themes feature an old man called "Grandpa Večerníček", who had his own Večerníček series in the 1980s. Thought to be a shepherd, Grandpa Večerníček lives in a house on a hill with his dog, who lives in a kennel. The old man, accompanied by the dog, "switches on" the stars in the sky, using a lamplighter's pole. During the closing theme, Grandpa Večerníček and the dog return to their house and kennel, except in winter, when the dog moves into the house because of the cold. Like the Czech Republic's, this is the longest-running opening and closing theme ever broadcast in Slovakia. Its original version has been revamped, with the addition of better colors, as well as a cat. It even had its own TV series called V chalupke a za chalupkou.

== History of the program ==
On January 2, 1965, a program named Večerníček appeared on Czechoslovak television. The current opening and closing themes were introduced in summer of 1965.

In Slovakia, the program's original name was "Good Night Story" (Rozprávka na dobrú noc).

Milan Nápravník designed the show's concept and was the first dramaturgist of the Czech version. Since 1973, Večerníček has been shown in color.

Practically all famous Czech and Slovak illustrators, writers, animators, and directors, such as Václav Čtvrtek (author of Víla Amálka), have participated in the program.

After 1989, Večerníček survived several attempts to change its themes and even cancel the program.

== Schedule ==
Until 1976, the Czech version of the program was broadcast on a variety of days, with frequent changes to its schedule.

From January 1976 – 2012, Večerníček was broadcast every day on ČT1, the first Czech national television channel. The channel would show one full series continuously for a block of days. Several attempts were made to broadcast the same or different series on ČT2, the second national television channel.

Since 2012, Večerníček has been broadcast on ČT2 instead of ČT1. Since the establishment of the children's Czech national television channel named ČT :D on 2013, it has been broadcast simultaneously there. After eight years of parallel broadcasting, Večerníček has been broadcast only on ČT :D since 2021.

== Popular shows ==
Some of the most popular cartoons on Večerníček have included Krkonošské pohádky, Mach a Šebestová, Pohádky z mechu a kapradí, Maxipes Fík, Krteček, Bob a Bobek – králíci z klobouku, Pat a Mat and Loupežník Rumcajs.

== Website ==
A Večerníček website was founded by Robert Štípek in 2005. It was designed to be a specialized database, providing a complete history of the program. As of 2010, the site announced plans to move to a new domain, vecernicek.cz, but this never happened.

== Trivia ==
- Asteroid 33377 Večerníček, discovered by Petr Pravec at Ondřejov Observatory on 12 February 1999, was named after the animated boy.
- The Ministry of Industry and Trade of the Czech Republic issued a stamp on 18 February 2015 to celebrate the 50th anniversary of the program, along with a First Day Cover.

== See also ==
- Wieczorynka
- TV Maci
- Sandmännchen
- Leka nosht, deca
