= Pohádky z mechu a kapradí =

- Created by: Václav Čtvrtek
- Written by: Anna Jurásková; Milan Nápravník; Zdeněk Smetana
- Directed by: Zdeněk Smetana
- Starring: Jiřina Bohdalová
- Composer: Jaroslav Celba
- Country of origin: Czechoslovakia
- Original language: Czech
- No. of seasons: 3
- No. of episodes: 39

Production
- Running time: 8 minutes

Original release
- Network: Czechoslovak Television
- Release: 6 October 1968 – 7 February 1979

Pohádky z mechu a kapradí (English: The Tales of Moss and Fern), also commonly referred to as Křemílek a Vochomůrka (English: Liam and Jack; Canada/USA Steve and Stanley), is a Czechoslovak animated children's television series produced from 1968 to 1979. The series focuses on the adventures of two forest gnomes named Křemílek and Vochomůrka, who are often dealing with certain problems. It was made by Krátký film Prague and their animation studio Bratři v triku.

== History ==
The series is based on the book with the same title by Václav Čtvrtek. It premiered on Czechoslovak Television on October 6, 1968. The first season was shot in black and white, with the remainder of the series being shot in color. Due to its success, a second season spanning 13 episodes was produced in 1970.

In 2014, Czech Television announced plans to colorize the first season by 2017. However, only the first 7 episodes were colorized and shown in 2018, with a 16:9 format being added as well.

In 2018 Czech Mint issued commemorative coin series "Pohádky z mechu a kapradí": "Křemílek", "Vochomůrka", and "Pařezová chaloupka" ("Log cabin") displaying the two elves and their cabin in gold and silver, designed by medalist Irena Hradecká.

== Episodes ==
1. Kterak seřídili hodiny s jednou ručičkou
2. Otvírání studánky
3. Kterak pudrovali jahody
4. Jak rozškrtli ohnivého mužíčka
5. Jak pekli a upekli koláč
6. Jak dostali račí sklíčko
7. Jak hostili myšáka
8. Jak rozbili medákovi sluníčkovou basu
9. Jak našli poklad
10. Jak vezli na sáňkách vejce
11. Kterak pekli kaštany
12. Jak přivedli domů světýlkovou vílu
13. Jak zpívali koledu
14. Jak Křemílek a Vochomůrka zasadili semínko
15. Jak Křemílek a Vochomůrka vařili šípkový čaj
16. Jak Křemílek a Vochomůrka měli hodiny se zlou kukačkou
17. Jak Křemílek a Vochomůrka šili kalhoty
18. Jak Křemílek a Vochomůrka nevěděli, co se děje
19. Jak Křemílka a Vochomůrku málem popadl drak
20. Jak Křemílek a Vochomůrka měli trápení s rakem
21. Jak Křemílek a Vochomůrka zabloudili v bedlovém lese
22. Jak šel Křemílek a Vochomůrka na pařezy
23. Jak si Křemílek a Vochomůrka ani nelízli povidel
24. Jak Křemílek a Vochomůrka hráli maličké víle
25. Jak Křemílek a Vochomůrka jedli kaši
26. Jak Křemílek a Vochomůrka přišli ke dvěma pěkným panenkám
27. Jak Křemílek a Vochomůrka šli pro první jarní pochutnání
28. Jak Křemílek a Vochomůrka honili basu
29. Jak Křemílek a Vochomůrka pozdravili myšku Filipku
30. Jak Křemílek a Vochomůrka našli pod borůvkou housličky
31. Jak si Křemílek a Vochomůrka udělali houpačku
32. Jak Křemílek a Vochomůrka učesali vílu
33. Jak Křemílek s Vochomůrkou vezli čtyři velké kameny
34. Jak Křemílek a Vochomůrka seděli na vajíčkách
35. Jak Křemílek a Vochomůrka měli trápení s drozdem
36. Jak Křemílek a Vochomůrka vystřelili z kanónu
37. Jak Křemílek s Vochomůrkou zatopili až druhou sirkou
38. Jak Křemílek a Vochomůrka hledali pět peněz
39. Jak Křemílek a Vochomůrka udělali obrovi píšťalku
