= Tuř =

- Municipality
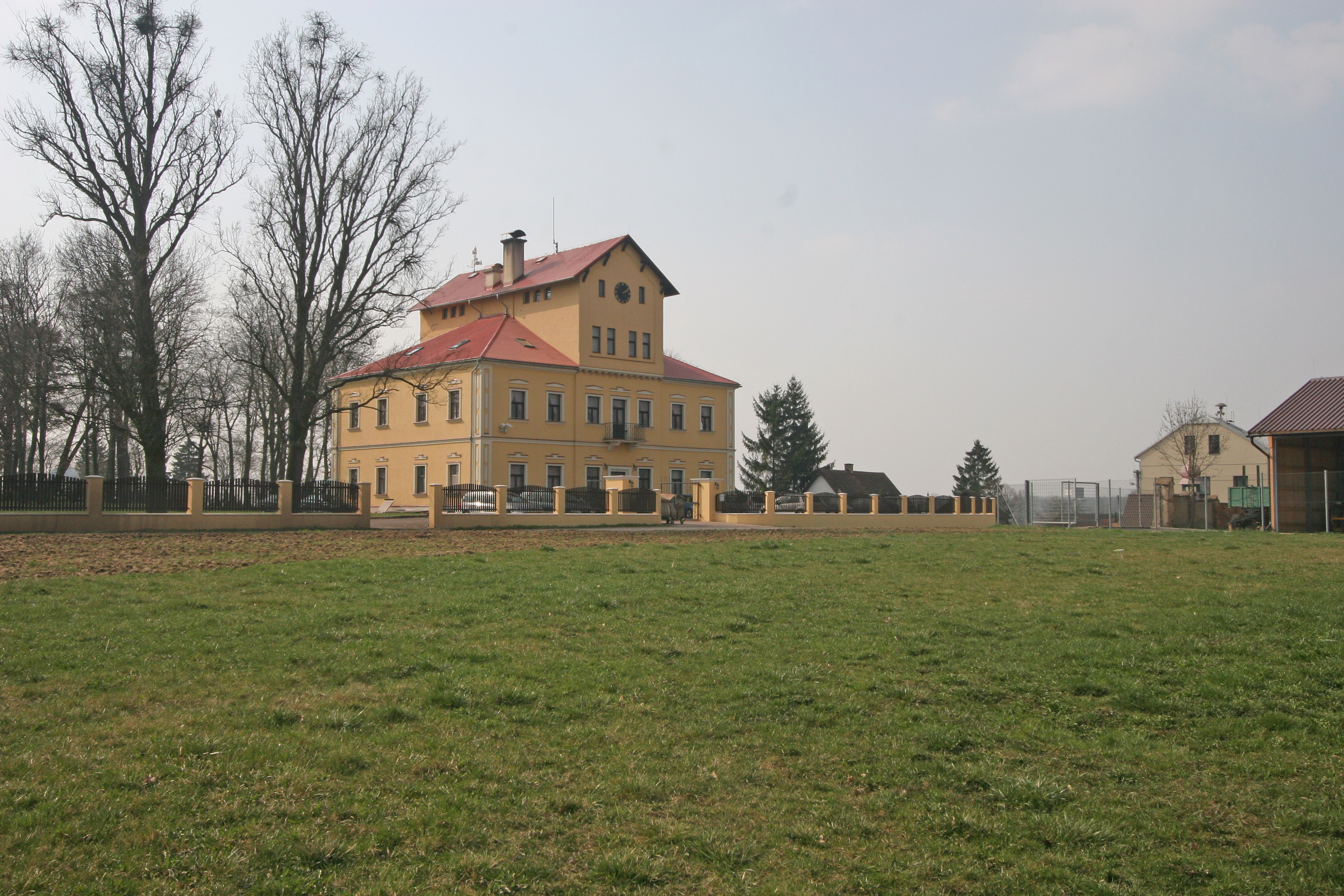
- Tuř Castle

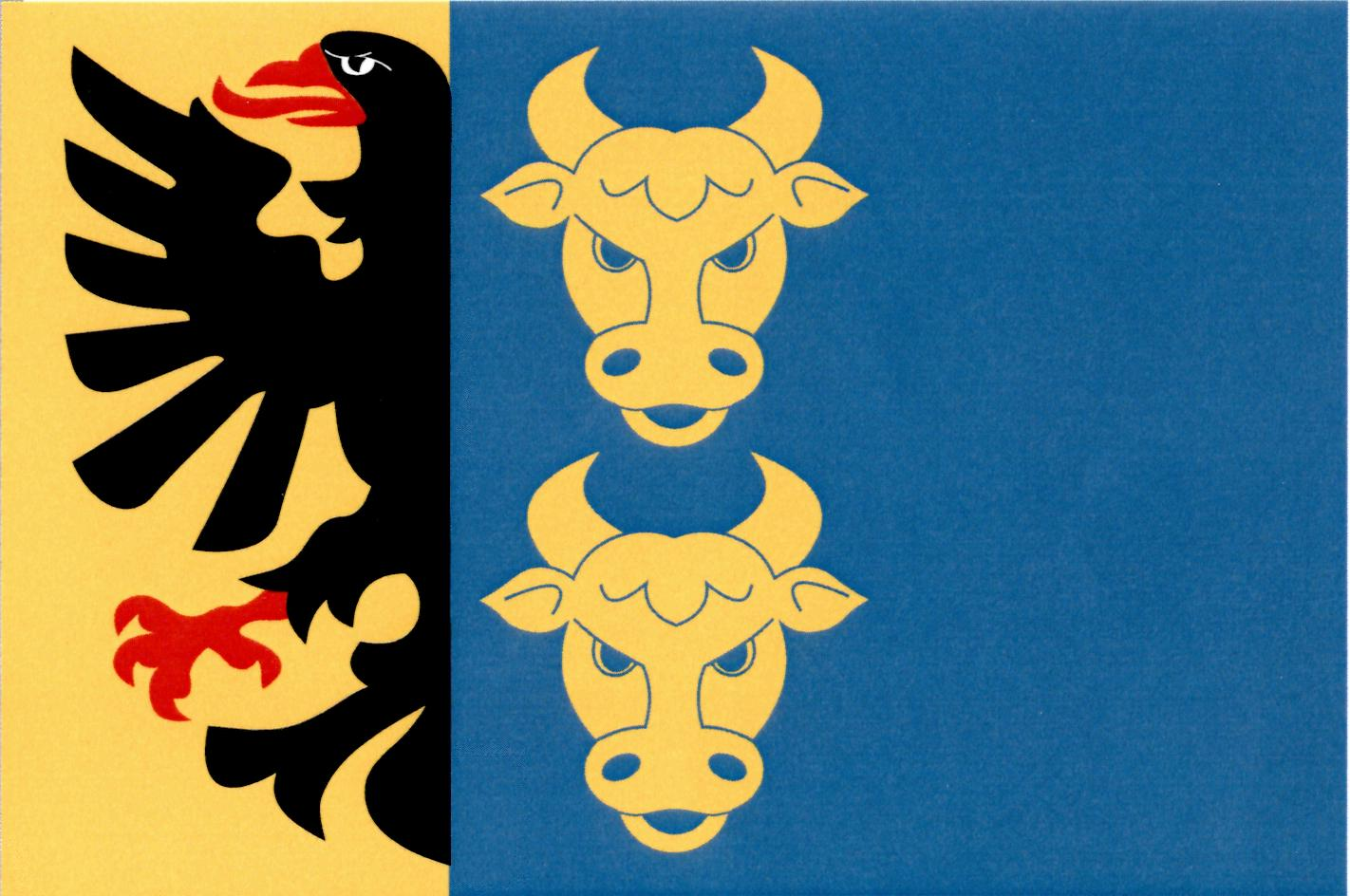
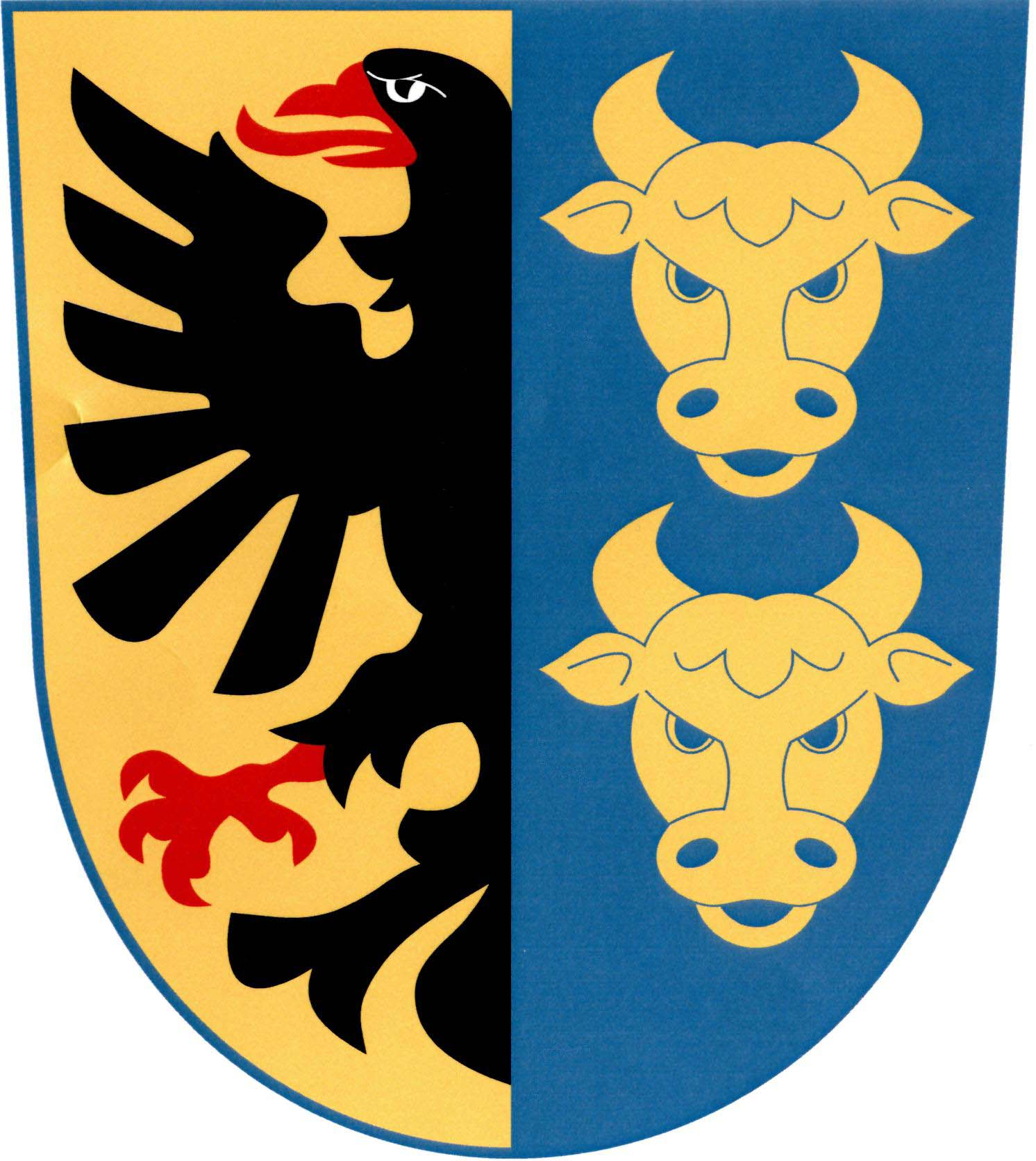
- Flag Coat of arms

- Location in the Czech Republic
- Coordinates: 50°23′42″N 15°25′1″E
- Country: Czech Republic
- Region: Hradec Králové
- District: Jičín
- First mentioned: 1368

Area
  - Total: 4.88 km^{2} (1.88 sq mi)
- Elevation: 270 m (890 ft)

Population (2026-01-01)
  - Total: 136
  - Density: 27.9/km^{2} (72.2/sq mi)
- Time zone: UTC+1 (CET)
  - Summer (DST): UTC+2 (CEST)
- Postal code: 506 01
- Website: www.obectur.cz

Tuř is a municipality and village in Jičín District in the Hradec Králové Region of the Czech Republic. It has about 100 inhabitants.

== History ==
In 2019, the village of Hubálov, originally part of Tuř, was joined to Jičín. The transfer of the entire cadastral territory is unique in the modern history of the country.

== Demographics ==
Historical population
| Year | Pop. | ±% |
|---|---|---|
| 1869 | 332 | — |
| 1880 | 376 | +13.3% |
| 1890 | 308 | −18.1% |
| 1900 | 284 | −7.8% |
| 1910 | 263 | −7.4% |
| 1921 | 261 | −0.8% |
| 1930 | 229 | −12.3% |
| 1950 | 159 | −30.6% |
| 1961 | 161 | +1.3% |
| 1970 | 155 | −3.7% |
| 1980 | 98 | −36.8% |
| 1991 | 75 | −23.5% |
| 2001 | 87 | +16.0% |
| 2011 | 104 | +19.5% |
| 2021 | 128 | +23.1% |
Source: Censuses (Note: Excluding Hubálov, which was part of Tuř until 2019.)
