= Bratři v triku =

Czech animation studio

Bratři v triku was a Czech animation studio founded in 1945 and was defuncted in 2012.

== History ==
The studio was founded in 1945. It was responsible for many award-winning films such as Munro. Famous animators such as Zdeněk Miler, Jiří Trnka, Břetislav Pojar. Jiří Brdečka and Zdeněk Smetana are linked with the studio. Also the studio created TV shows and serials, notable are Krtek, Bob a Bobek, Čtyřlístek, Kosí bratři, Víla Amálka and Mach a Šebestová to name a few. Bratři v Triku became less prominent after Velvet Revolution.
