= Ottó Foky =

- Born: June 15, 1927; Sarhida, Hungary
- Died: September 3, 2012 (aged 85)
- Occupation: Animator

Ottó Foky (June 15, 1927 – September 3, 2012) was a Hungarian animator. He was born in Sárhida.

== Films ==
=== Director ===
- Egy világhírű vadász emlékiratai (1968–70)
- A kiscsacsi kalandjai (1971)
- Mirr-Murr, a kandúr (1972–75)
- Makk Marci mesél (1973)
- Babfilm (Scenes with beans, 1975)
- A legkisebb Ugrifüles (1975–76)
- Makk Marci (1977-1978)
- Varjúdombi mesék (1978–79)
- Misi mókus kalandjai (1980–81)
- TV Maci (1982)
- Süsüke, a sárkánygyerek (2000)
