= Luděk Frýbort =

Czech writer (1933–2019)

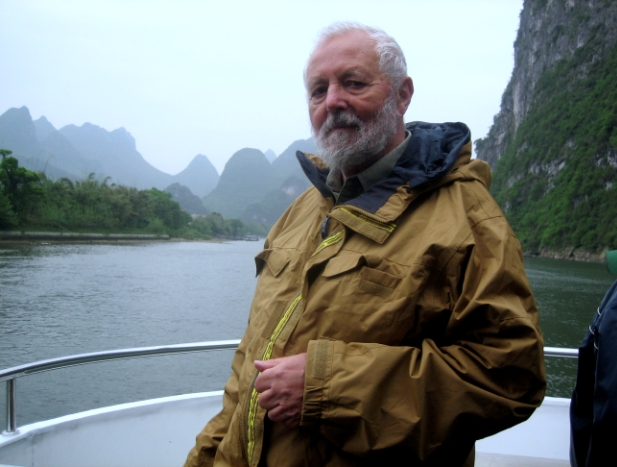
- Born: 25 August 1933; Jičín, Czechoslovakia
- Died: 22 November 2019; Hannover, Germany
- Occupations: Writer, publisher
- Spouse: Sylvia Frybort
- Children: Richard Frybort, Erik Frybort
- Writing career
- Notable works: Cesi ocima exulanta Svet bez ruzovych bryli

Luděk Frýbort (25 August 1933 – 20 November 2019) was a writer and author living in Hanover, Germany.

He published a large number of articles and multiple books with political commentaries, in both Czech and German languages. His texts, written in a distinctive archaic style, often defend conservative worldview by common-sense arguments and use hyperbole to question various currently fashionable opinions. He often wrote about history and important, though often largely forgotten historical persons such as Joseph Radetzky von Radetz, he also publicly advocated monarchism.

== Books ==
- Češi očima exulanta, vydavatelství Annonce 2000 - výběr z úvah a esejů
- Praotcové, Annonce 2001 - polohistorický román
- Svět bez růžových brýlí, Annonce 2002 - pozorování a úvahy z cest
- Je na Západ cesta dlouhá..., Annonce 2003 - výběr z úvah a esejů
- Prokletí rodu Slavníkova, Annonce 2004 - historický román
- Mlýny boží i ďáblovy, Annonce 2006 - román z nedávné minulosti
- Z blízka i z daleka bez růžových brýlí, Annonce 2009 - pozorování a úvahy z cest
- Vlast naše Západ, Euroslavica 2011 - výběr z úvah a esejů
