= Radek Pilař =

Czech artist (1931–1993)

- Born: 23 April 1931; Písek, Czechoslovakia
- Died: 7 February 1993 (aged 61); Prague, Czech Republic
- Known for: illustrations, animation
- Notable work: Rumcajs

Signature
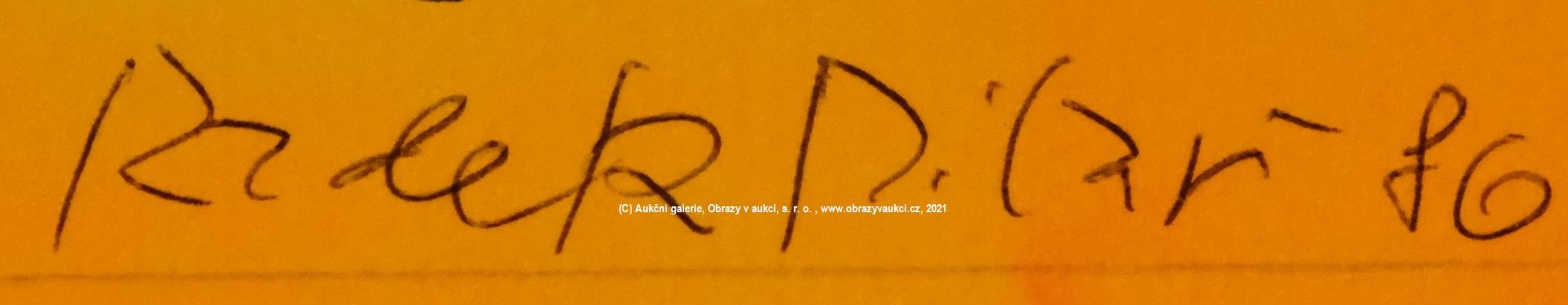

Radek Pilař (23 April 1931 – 7 February 1993) was a Czech artist. He is best known as a children's book illustrator and animator, but he was also a graphic artist, painter, filmmaker and film director. His most famous works include the images of popular fictional character of Rumcajs. Pilař is recognized as the founder of Czech video art and the founder of the Department of Animated Film at Film and TV School of the Academy of Performing Arts in Prague.

== Biography ==
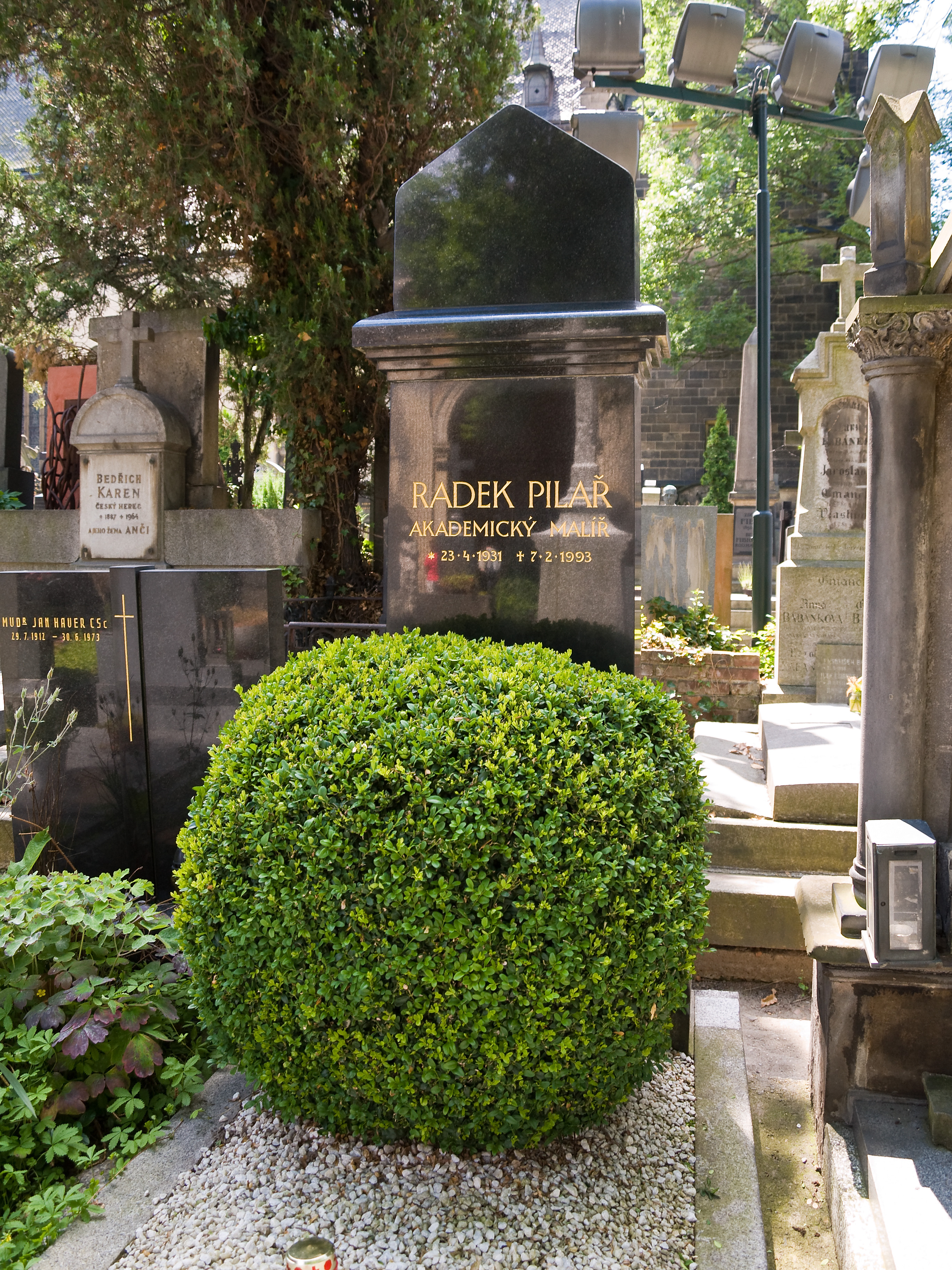
Radek Pilař's grave in the Vyšehrad Cemetery

Radek Pilař was born on 23 April 1931 in Písek. From childhood he was fascinated by the camera and visual arts. He graduated from the Academy of Fine Arts, Prague where he studied with Professor Vlastimil Rada. He briefly collaborated with Semafor theatre, then he collaborated with the Czechoslovak Television and with Krátký film Praha (a company focused on producing short films).

Pilař became most famous as an illustrator. He became a successful illustrator of children's books, which is why he was offered the opportunity to create an animation for the theme song for Večerníček, a children's TV show with bedtime stories. It is still broadcast in its original form today. But his most famous work was the creation of the character of Rumcajs, the gallant robber (written by Václav Čtvrtek, broadcast in 1967–1984). As a book, it was published in 35 countries around the world.

Pilař had more than 40 solo exhibitions, illustrated 50 books for children published worldwide, and created around 40 short films and bedtime stories for Večerníček. His artistic interests included also painting, graphics, filmmaking and directing. He regretted that, for his fame in the field of illustration and animation, he was not appreciated as a painter and author of works for adults.

Pilař is recognized as the founder of Czech video art. He is the founder of the Department of Animated Film at Film and TV School of the Academy of Performing Arts in Prague. He lectured there and was one of the students' favorite professors, serving as a role model for many students.

He was married twice. The first marriage lasted a short time, but he spent the rest of his life with his second wife and had two daughters, Barbora and Marina. He died after a second heart attack on 7 February 1993, at the age of 61.

== Awards and recognition ==
Pilař received a number of awards, including Silver Dancer Award for Best Animated Film at the Huesca Short Film Festival, Spain, for his film Botička. He was included in the Hans Christian Andersen Award's Honor List.

In 1990, he was elected Honorary Citizen of Jičín, the town associated with Rumcajs.
