= Henrik Svensen =

Norwegian judge and politician

Henrik Svensen (17 July 1904–16 August 2007) was a Norwegian judge and politician for the Conservative Party.

He was born in Askøy Municipality, finished his secondary education in 1922 and got his law degree in 1926. He was a junior solicitor from 1926 to 1927, deputy judge in Hardanger District Court from 1928 to 1930, secretary in the Ministry of Justice from 1933 to 1937 and in the administration of Bergen Municipality from 1938 to 1942.

He was a member of Bergen city council from 1951 to 1961. He was elected to the Parliament of Norway from Bergen in 1954, and was re-elected on one occasion, notably chairing the Standing Committee on Defence in his second term. He worked as a presiding judge in Gulating Court of Appeal from 1945 to 1961, and in Eidsivating Court of Appeal briefly in 1961 before becoming County Governor of Aust-Agder, a post he held until 1974. He was president of Norges Forsvarsforening from 1962 to 1966.

Svensen died in August 2007, aged 103.

Government offices
Preceded by Nils Hjelmtveit	County Governor of Aust-Agder; 1961–1974	Succeeded by Ebba Lodden
