= Vlastislav Hofman =

Czech artist and architect (1884–1964)

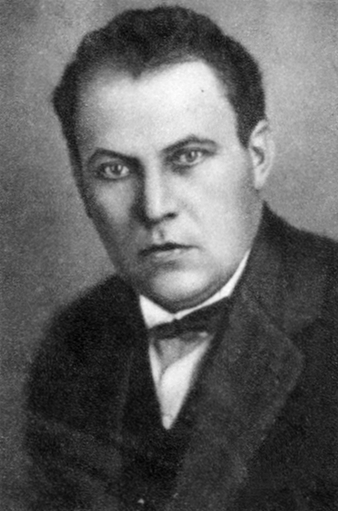
- Властислав Гофман. 1928 год
- Born: 6 February 1884; Jičín
- Died: 28 August 1964 (aged 80); Prague
- Resting place: Vinohrady Cemetery
- Alma mater: Czech Technical University in Prague
- Occupation: Architect, painter, scenographer, typographer, illustrator, graphic artist
- Website: www.vlastislavhofman.cz

Signature
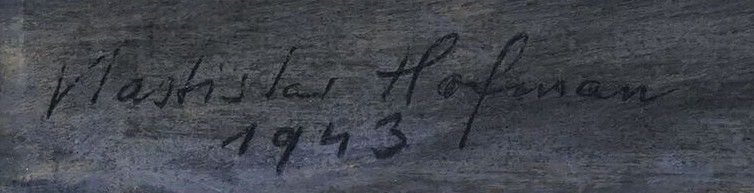

Vlastislav Hofman (6 February 1884 – 28 August 1964) was an artist and architect who lived and worked first in the Austro-Hungarian Empire and later in Czechoslovakia. Though he was a painter, set designer, graphic artist, furniture designer, and author, Hofman is best known as an architect strongly influenced by Cubism.

== Life ==
Born in Jičín in Bohemia, Hofman studied architecture in Prague from 1902 to 1907. He was otherwise self-taught in the arts. He was active in avant garde art movements in his homeland, and he associated with artists and writers of the time, including Karel Čapek. Hofman wrote many pieces on political subjects and the philosophy of art, especially for the journal Právo lidu ("People's Right"). His stage designs were mainly for the Vinohrady Theatre (Divadlo na Vinohradich) in Prague. Hofman's design for director Karel Hilar's 1926 production of Hamlet was particularly notable.

== Gallery ==
Brush and watercolor drawing with inverted tree motif, 1911

Brush and watercolor design, 1911

Brush and watercolor design, 1911

Design for a sitting room with sofa, two chairs, and table, 1919
