= Miluše Bittnerová =

Czech actress and presenter

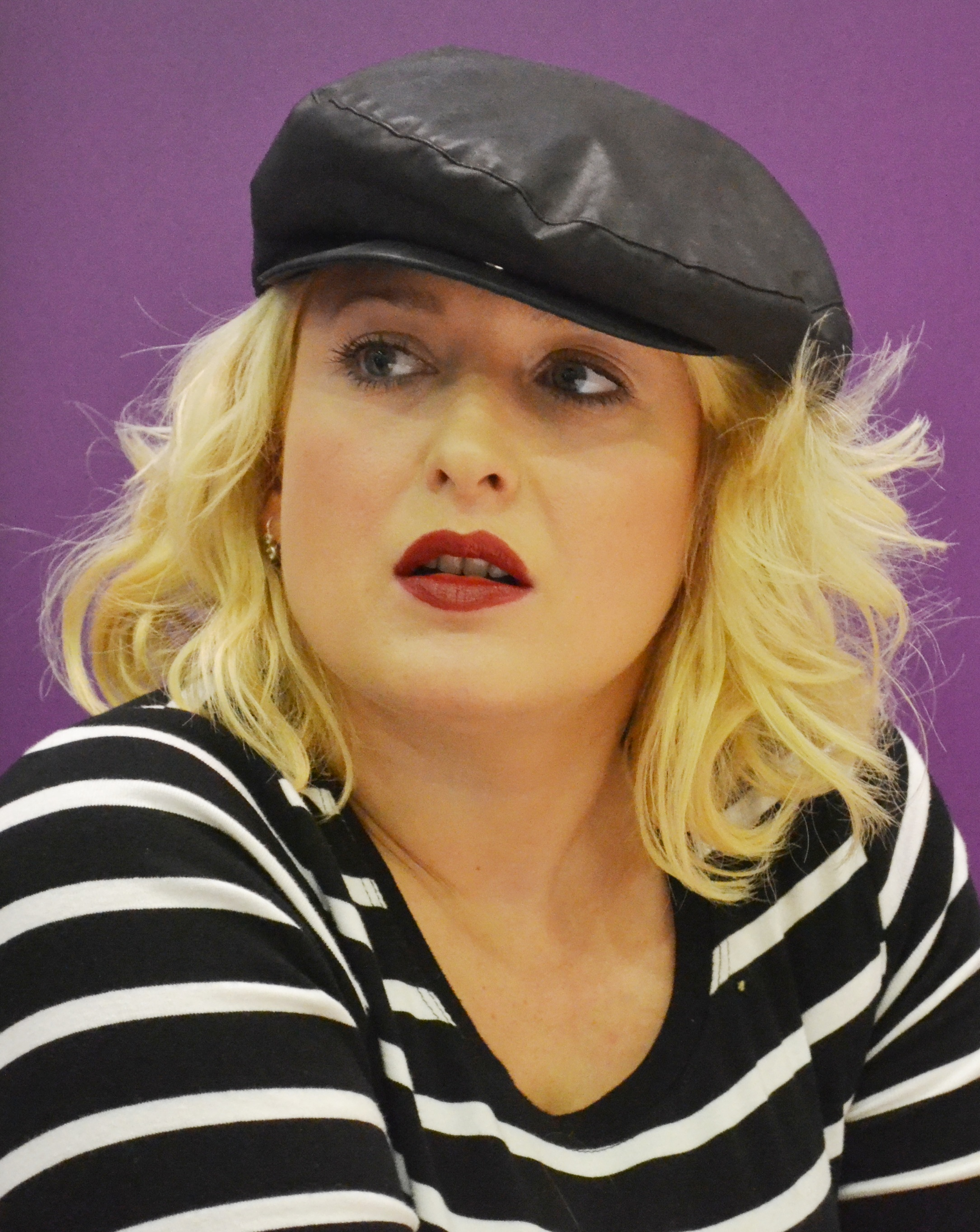
- Miluše Bittnerová (2015)
- Born: 10 December 1977 (age 48); Jičín, Czechoslovakia
- Occupations: Actress, presenter
- Years active: 1989–present
- Children: 1

Miluše Bittnerová (born 10 December 1977 in Jičín) is a Czech actress and presenter.

== Selected filmography ==
=== Films ===
- Nejlepší přítel (2017) TV
- Hodina klavíru (2017) TV
- Tajemství pouze služební (2016)
- Andílek na nervy (2015)
- Bankrotáři (2003) TV

=== TV series ===
- Kameňák (2019)
- Jetelín (2016)
- Ohnivý kuře (2016)
- Ordinace v růžové zahradě (2009)
- Ulice (2005)
