= Václav Čtvrtek =

Czech poet and author (1911–1976)

Václav Čtvrtek

Václav Cafourek (4 April 1911 – 6 November 1976), commonly known under his pen name of Václav Čtvrtek, was a Czech poet and author. His most famous works include Křemílek and Vochomůrka, Rumcajs and Víla Amálka. He primarily wrote fairy tales for children, and some of his works have been adapted on the Czech children's television program Večerníček. On 4 April 2011, Google celebrated his 100th birthday by replacing the original Google logo with a doodle celebrating his works for a day on Google Czech Republic.

== Biography ==
Čtvrtek was born on 4 April 1911 in Prague, Austria-Hungary. However, he spent a part of his childhood in Jičín, the town which later became the setting for his stories and fairy tales. He studied at gymnasium (graduated in 1931) and continued his studies at the Faculty of Law of the Charles University in Prague. Initially, he worked as a clerk, and only after World War II he began contributing to the children's magazines, such as Mateřídouška and Ohníček. In 1949, he was engaged as a dramaturgist in the Czechoslovak Radio, where he participated in broadcasting for children and youth. From the late 1950s, he created scripts for cartoons produced by the Czechoslovak Television. In collaboration with illustrators Radek Pilař, Gabriela Dubská and Bohumil Šiška, directors Ladislav Čapek, Zdeněk Smetana, Václav Bedřich and voice actors Karel Höger, Vlastimil Brodský, Jiřina Bohdalová and Jiří Hrzán he created some of the most popular cycles of the television programme Večerníček. In his later years, Čtvrtek focused on writing. He wrote more than 70 books, mainly for children.

He died on 6 November 1976 in Prague, Czechoslovakia.

== Works ==
- Whitehors a dítě s pihou (1940),
- Veselé pohádky o pejskovi a kočičce, strýci, hrochovi, loupežnících a jiných lidech a zvířátkách (1947),
- Jak pejsek a kočička pěstovali kaktus (1947),
- Lev utekl (1948),
- Kolotoč v Africe (1948),
- Král Lávra (1952),
- Honza, Čert a kašpárek (1956) (later remade for TV as Kasparek, Honza a ti druzi)
- Doktor Ludva Faust a povídky (1956),
- Budulínek (1957),
- My tři a pes z Pětipes (1958) (later adapted as a movie in 1971)
- Směr vesmír - start (1959), sci-fi literature
- Pohádkové příběhy kominíka Valenty (1960),
- Modrý kosatec (1961),
- Chlapec s prakem (1961), sci-fi novel for youth
- O Kubovi (1961),
- Čáry máry na zdi (1961),
- Patero pohádek pro závěsné loutky (1962),
- Zlaté pero (1962),
- Kosí strom (1963),
- Zlatá lilie (1964),
- Hodinky s lokomotivou (1965),
- Malá letní romance (1966),
- Duha a jelen Stovka (1966),
- Veselí mrtví (1967),
- Dobrodruzi z Devátého náměstí (1968),
- Pohádková muzika (1968),
- Pohádky z mechu a kapradí (1968),
- Pohádkový kalendář (1969),
- Pohádky ze čtyř studánek (1969),
- Rumcajs (1970),
- O Česílkovi, Šejtročkovi a jednom známém loupežníkovi (1970),
- O makové panence a motýlu Emanuelovi (1970),
- Vodník Česílko (1970),
- Z nejkrásnějších pohádek V.Čtvrtka (1970),
- Zpívající psíci při měsíci (1970),
- Kočičiny kocourka Damiána (1971) (adopted in a TV series by 1987),
- Jak si Rumcajs poradil s rakem (1971),
- Rumcajsova loupežnická knížka (1971),
- Rumcajsova vánoční pohádka (1972),
- Jak čert hlídal díru do pekla (1973),
- O víle Amálce a žabce Márince (1973),
- Císařská vojna se sultánem a jiné pohádky na motivy lidových písní (1973),
- O Rumcajsovi a loupežnickém synku Cipískovi (1973),
- Malá zlá kouzelnice a drak (1974),
- Pohádky z pařezové chaloupky Křemílka a Vochomůrky (1974),
- Cipísek (1975),
- Manka (1975),
- Malá zlá kouzelnice (1975),
- Neuvěřitelná příhoda práčete Leška (1975), originally published under the title Chlapec s prakem
- Jak si Slávek načaroval dubového mužíčka (1976),

Published posthumously:

- Nezbedné pověsti pro dospělé (1977),
- Cesty formana Šejtročka (1977),
- Čtyři Berberkos (1978),
- Franta a já (1978),
- Lenka a dva kluci (1978),
- Jak si Rumcajs poslal Cipíska pro pomoc (1978),
- Pohádka o myslivci a víle (1978),
- Jak ševci zvedli vojnu pro červenou sukni (1979),
- O hajném Robátkovi a jelenu Větrníkovi (1979),
- Podivuhodné vyprávění bývalého piráta Kolíska (1981),
- Rumcajsova loupežnická knížka (2007),
- Cipískova loupežnická knížka (2007),
- Rumcajs - leporelo pro nejměnší děti (2007),
- Jak Cipísek chránil jelení studánku - leporelo pro nejmenší děti (2008),
- Kočičiny kocourka Damiána (2008),
- Čtení o vepříkovi a kůzleti (2008),
- Jak ševci zvedli vojnu pro červenou sukni - Stázina (2008),
- Jak ševci zvedli vojnu pro červenou sukni - Kuba (2008).
