= Víla Amálka =

Czechoslovak animated TV series

Víla Amálka stand at the 60 Years of Večerníček exhibition in Prague

Víla Amálka (Amalka the Fairy (Note: Amalka is a diminutive from Amalia and vílas are nymphs in Czech and other Slavic folklore)) is a Czechoslovak animated television series created in 1973 and first aired in 1975. It was, and still regularly is, aired as part of Večerníček, a long-running evening TV programme for children. The author was Václav Čtvrtek. The series was drawn and directed by Václav Bedřich, with narration by Jiří Hrzán.

Amalka is a forest nymph: "A mist formed in the forest clearing, the wind blew, and suddenly a girl appeared, who decided to call herself víla Amálka."

In 2013, Amálka started gaining popularity in Japan, with the episodes having been dubbed into Japanese. A toy range featuring characters from the show has also been released.

== Episodes ==
13 episodes of about 8 minutes each were produced.

1. Jak nechala stát myslivce Mušku v lese
2. Jak potkala beránka Kudrnu
3. Jak našla kámen mutáček
4. Jak seděla v zelené kleci
5. Jak se udělala ptáčkem
6. Jak zatančila králi
7. Jak obrátila potok
8. Jak jí vodník Kebule málem řekl sedm
9. Jak přetancovala obra Hrompáce
10. Jak pomáhala ježkovi s horkou tlapkou
11. Jak vyléčila ty dva, Hrompáce a Ohniváče
12. Jak potkala oříškového panáčka
13. Jak odešla spát až do jara
