= Wieczorynka =

Polish children's programming block

Wieczorynka (alternatively: Dobranocka) is an evening programming block intended for children of preschool and early school age, broadcast on TVP ABC. From the 1950s until 2013, it was a short block of cartoons and animated series for children broadcast on TVP1. In the 1950s and 1960s, all editions were shown live, some as late as the 1970s. In 2013–2014, the block was additionally broadcast on TVP Kultura, and in 1992–2021 also on TVP Polonia, where from 2014 it was called Dobranocka. Between 2019 and 2021, the program was still broadcast by TVP Wilno.

== History ==
In Poland, the beginnings of the strand coincides with the launch of television in the 1950s. This slot was broadcast in the nationwide First Program of Polish Television in the evenings and lasted a maximum of 15 minutes. In the 1970s, the bedtime program broadcast on Sunday evenings was called Wieczorynka and lasted less than 30 minutes. However, the previous name was soon restored also on Sundays. Until 1993, the program was called Dobranocka.

The first bedtime shows of the 1950s and 1960s were not yet animated, they featured actors, toys and moving boards. One of the first characters appearing in Good Nights was the Mr. Darned puppet, made of a glove with button-eyes sewn on. Miś z okienka was broadcast from 1958 to 1973. In the "window", the bear talked to an actor (first Stanisław Wyszyński, then Bronisław Pawlik) about various books for children. In 1959, Przygody Gąski Balbinka appeared, the prototype of which were short fairy tales by Danuta Mancewicz published in Świerszczyk and then printed in the form of a booklet. Each episode was a set of static boards showing the adventures of Balbinka and her friend, the lisping Chicken Ptyś, and the characters' dialogues were read by the author, Danuta Mancewicz. Simple animation was also used in Przygody Gapiszon (1964–1966), whose originator and illustrator was Bohdan Butenko. The title Gapiszon was painted on a glass pane, behind which landscapes of Warsaw were moved.

In the 1990s, Dobranocka was the first in Poland to broadcast animated series by Walt Disney. After the fall of the Polish People's Republic, series and cartoons broadcast on this channel also enjoyed high viewership, including: Franklin, Tabaluga, various productions with Winnie the Pooh, Chuggington, Make Way for Noddy, Moomin, Postman Pat and the repeatedly-rerun Maya the Honey Bee and The Smurfs.

=== Popular Polish series ===
Over the years, many Polish cartoon were created especially for Dobranocka (later Wieczorynka). Most of them, made using various techniques, were created in the Se-ma-for studio in Łódź and Studio Filmów Rysunkowych in Bielsko-Biała. The most popular include: Przygody kota Filemona, Miś Uszatek, Bolek i Lolek, Reksio, Dziwne przygody Koziołka Matołka, Pies, Kot i..., Porwanie Baltazara Gąbki, Plastusiowy pamiętnik, Wędrówki Pyzy, Mały pingwin Pik-Pok, Pampalini łowca zwierząt, Kulfon, co z ciebie wyrośnie?, Przygody Misia Colargola, Przygód kilka wróbla Ćwirka, Pomysłowy Dobromir, Zaczarowany ołówek, Król Maciuś Pierwszy, Pamiętnik Florki, and also Rodzina Treflików.

== Airing ==
Since the 1950s, the programs was broadcast every day on the First Program of Polish Television (TVP1) around 7 p.m. before the main edition of Dziennik Telewizyjny, later, News. Both newscasts were broadcast at 7:30 p.m.

During the last year of Wieczorynka broadcast on TVP1, i.e. in 2012–2013, the broadcast lasted from 5 to 10 minutes. At that time, the half-hour Wieczorynka was broadcast by TVP Kultura at 7:30 p.m.

Since February 15, 2014, the evening has been functioning as a daily series of Polish and foreign fairy tales and animated series, which is shown on the TVP ABC channel dedicated to children between 7:00 p.m. and 8:00 p.m. This band broadcasts only productions intended for preschool and early school children.

In 2014, the former name of the program, Dobranocka (defunct since 1993), returned. This name was used to describe an approximately 15-minute program for children, exclusively with Polish cartoons and animated series, broadcast on TVP Polonia and TVP Wilno (only digital terrestrial television in Lithuania) at 7:45pm, just before the broadcast of the main edition of the Polonia 24 news service, which in 2020 replaced the previously rebroadcast Wiadomości. Dobranocka was addressed especially to children from emigrant families living abroad and who did not have access to Polish-language channels with children's productions. Dobranocka disappeared from both channels on March 15, 2021, when the channels returned to broadcasting the main news service of Telewizja Polska at 7:30pm.

The Polish Wieczorynka, broadcast from February 15, 2014, on TVP ABC, is an exception compared to other countries, as it lasts approximately 60 minutes. However, this is a block that consists of several different productions every day, interrupted by specially adapted announcements and information for children.

=== Withdrawal of Wieczorynka from TVP1 ===
On June 17, 2013, the president of TVP, Juliusz Braun, announced the removal of Wieczorynka from the TVP1 schedule. The reason for this decision were programming changes and a sharp decline in viewership, as there were already channels on the Polish media market offering programs for children 24 hours a day, and some stations already had well-developed bands intended for the youngest viewers. Another reason for its removal from the channel were plans to launch a new children's channel, TVP ABC, which was launched in 2014. Wieczorynka last appeared on TVP1 on August 30, 2013, and the last series shown in the block was Peppa Pig. Until February 15, 2014, Disney animated series in the Walt Disney Przedstawia series were broadcast on weekends at frequently changing times between 6:30pm and 7:30pm.

== See also ==
- Večerníček
