= Staré Místo =

- Municipality
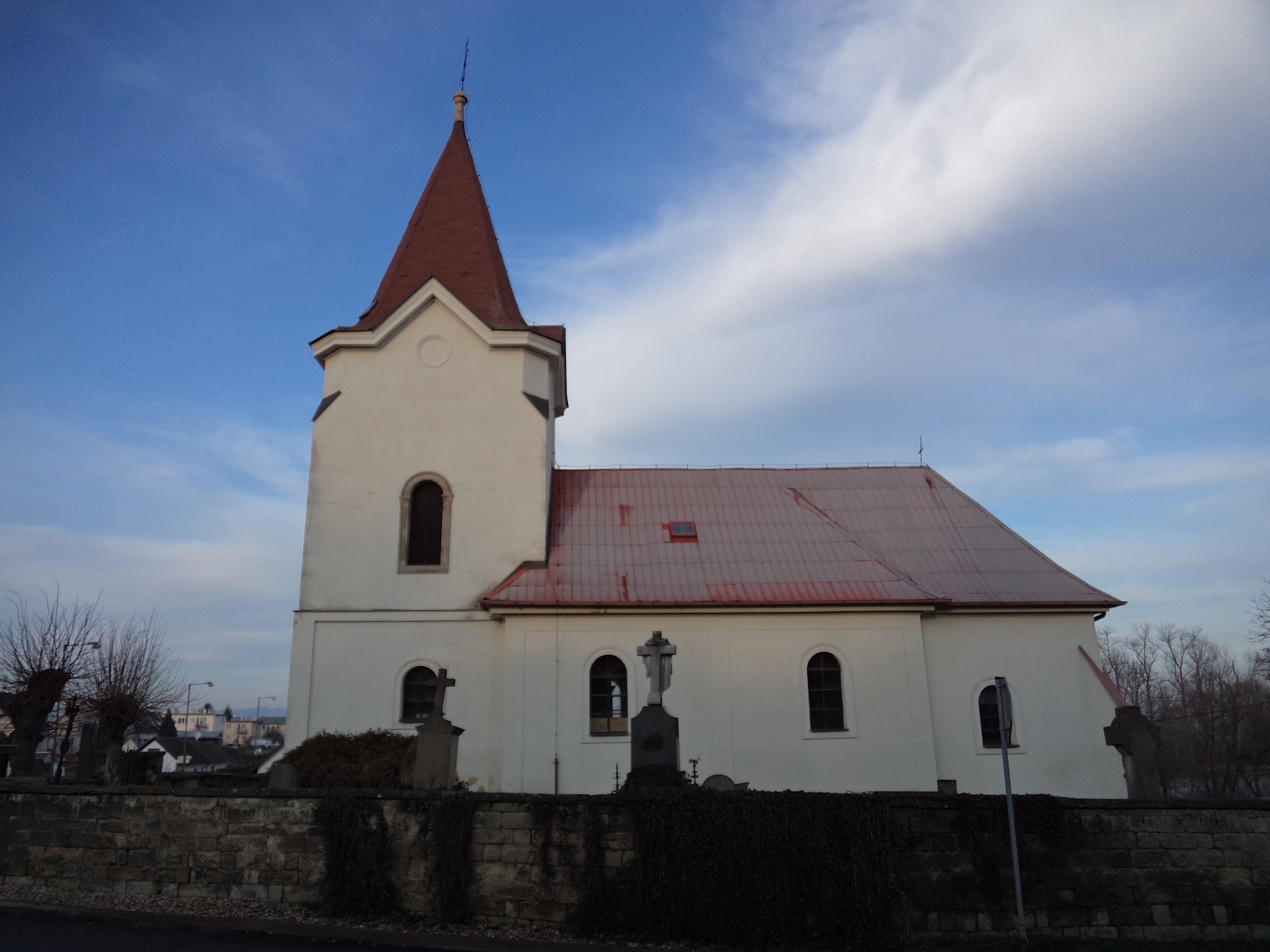
- Church of Saint Francis of Assisi

- Flag Coat of arms

- Location in the Czech Republic
- Coordinates: 50°24′18″N 15°20′32″E
- Country: Czech Republic
- Region: Hradec Králové
- District: Jičín
- First mentioned: 1327

Area
  - Total: 3.03 km^{2} (1.17 sq mi)
- Elevation: 282 m (925 ft)

Population (2026-01-01)
  - Total: 292
  - Density: 96.4/km^{2} (250/sq mi)
- Time zone: UTC+1 (CET)
  - Summer (DST): UTC+2 (CEST)
- Postal code: 506 01
- Website: www.staremisto.cz

Staré Místo is a municipality and village in Jičín District in the Hradec Králové Region of the Czech Republic. It has about 300 inhabitants.

== Demographics ==
Historical population
Year	Pop.	±%
1869	318	—
1880	301	−5.3%
1890	324	+7.6%
1900	347	+7.1%
1910	330	−4.9%
1921	320	−3.0%
1930	271	−15.3%
1950	179	−33.9%
1961	188	+5.0%
1970	227	+20.7%
1980	253	+11.5%
1991	326	+28.9%
2001	336	+3.1%
2011	305	−9.2%
2021	305	+0.0%
Source: Censuses
