= Nils Hjelmtveit =

Norwegian educator and politician (1892–1985)

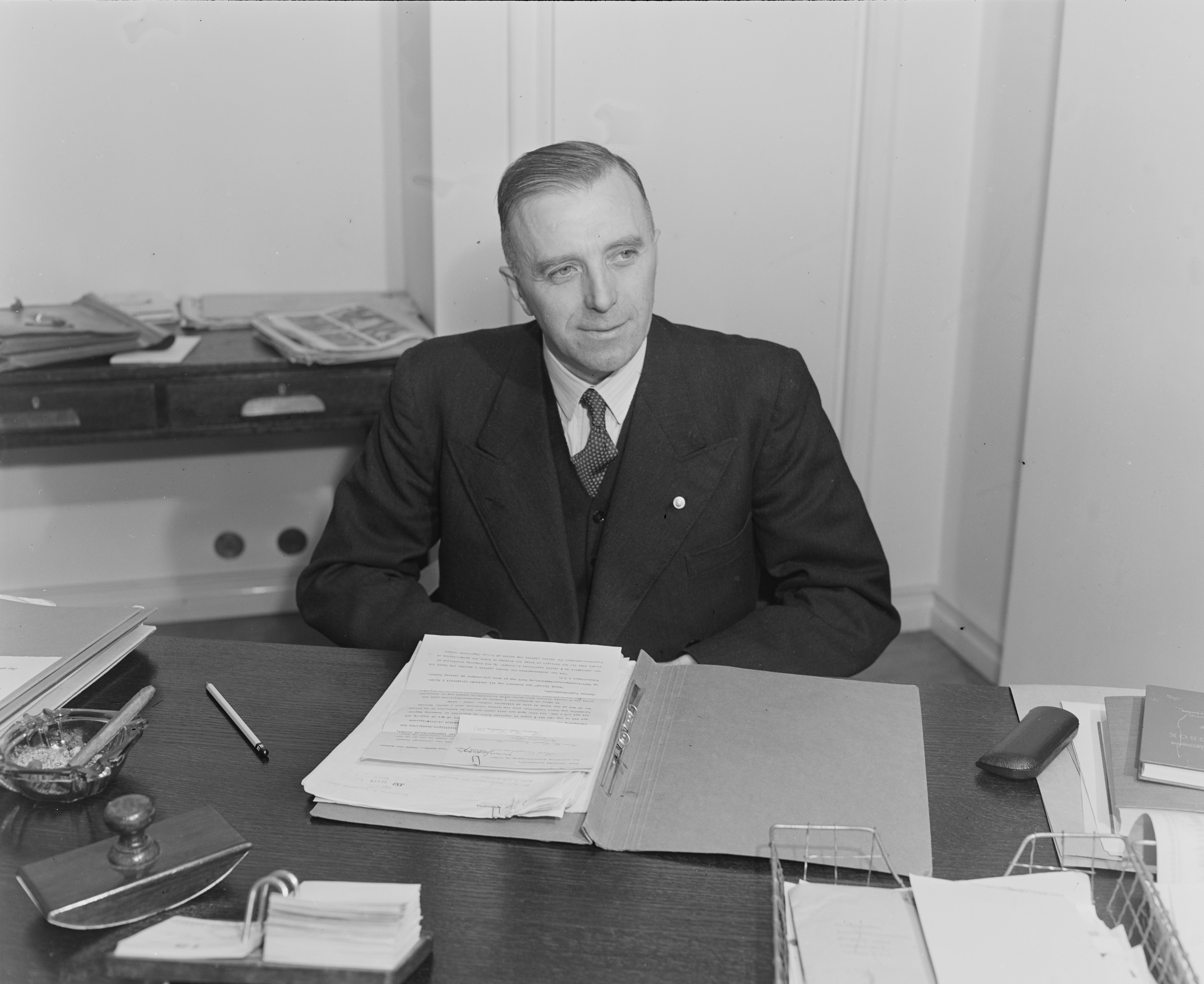

Minister of Education and Church Affairs
- In office 20 March 1935 – 25 June 1945
- Prime Minister: Johan Nygaardsvold
- Preceded by: Knut Liestøl
- Succeeded by: Kaare Fostervoll

County Governor of East Agder
- In office 1 July 1945 – 30 September 1961
- Prime Minister: Einar Gerhardsen; Oscar Torp
- Preceded by: Jonas Pedersen (1942)
- Succeeded by: Henrik Svensen

Mayor of Stokken Municipality
- In office 1 January 1931 – 20 March 1935
- Preceded by: Hans J. Bakke
- Succeeded by: Syver Kristiansen
- In office 1 January 1922 – 31 December 1928
- Preceded by: Guttorm Fløistad
- Succeeded by: Hans J. Bakke

Member of the Norwegian Parliament
- In office 1 January 1925 – 31 December 1930
- Constituency: Aust-Agder

Personal details
- Born: 21 July 1892 Alversund, Hordaland, United Kingdoms of Sweden and Norway
- Died: 30 October 1985 (aged 93) Austre Moland, Aust-Agder, Norway
- Party: Labour
- Spouse: Karen Adelma Andersen (m. 1918)

Nils Hjelmtveit (21 July 1892–30 October 1985) was a Norwegian educator and politician for the Labour Party. He was mayor of Stokken Municipality, MP from 1925 to 1930, Minister of Education and Church Affairs from 1935 to 1945 and County Governor of Aust-Agder from 1945 to 1961.

== Early career ==
He was born at Hopland in Alversund Municipality as a son of farmer Nils Hjelmtveit, Sr. (1861–1911) and his wife Ingebjørg Herland (1865–1893). He graduated from Stord Teacher's College in 1913, and was hired as a teacher in Eydehamn in the same year. He was promoted to headmaster in 1918. In December 1918, he married Karen Adelma Andersen (1894–1991).

== National politics ==
From 1919 to 1920 he also published the temperance weekly magazine Egden. Hjelmtveit was a member of the municipal council of Stokken Municipality from 1919 to 1937, and served as mayor from 1923 to 1928 and 1932 to 1935. He also chaired the school board from 1921 to 1922. He was elected to the Parliament of Norway from Aust-Agder in 1924 and 1927, serving two terms. In 1935, when Nygaardsvold's Cabinet assumed office, Hjelmtveit was appointed Minister of Education and Church Affairs. He reportedly had to be strongly persuaded by Johan Nygaardsvold. Some of the cases that were decided during Hjelmtveit's tenure were naming of the committees that prepared the University of Bergen, Riksteatret and the Norwegian State Educational Loan Fund, closing of the teachers' colleges at Hamar and Notodden, the language reform of 1938, poet's grant to Arnulf Øverland, construction of Kringkastingshuset and the signing of a Norwegian-Czechoslovak cultural cooperation treaty.

From 1940 to 1945 Hjelmtveit was exiled in London together with the rest of Nygaardsvold's Cabinet, because of the occupation of Norway by Nazi Germany. Hjelmtveit later defended the cabinet's actions on 9 April 1940, when they fled from the invading Germans. The war memoirs Vekstår og vargtid came in 1969. While exiled he wrote the book Education in Norway, published 1946. Between the war's end (8 May 1945) and Hjelmtveit's return to Norway, Alv Harald Helland and Terje Wold filled in as Minister of Education and Research. He stepped down in June 1945, when Gerhardsen's First Cabinet took over. On 1 December 1945 he became County Governor of Aust-Agder, a post he held until 1961. He headed the Norwegian delegation to found UNESCO in London in 1945, and also headed the delegation for UNESCO's 1st General Conference in Paris in 1946.

Hjelmtveit was a temperance activist, and was a local board member of the International Organisation of Good Templars. He was a member of the council of Vinmonopolet from 1929, deputy chair from 1932 to 1935, and then chair from 1946. He was also a board chairman of the newspaper Tiden from 1929 to 1934, a board member of the Norse Federation, deputy chair of the Norwegian Broadcasting Corporation from 1946 to 1957 and chair from 1957 to 1965. In the 1950s, 1960s and 1970s he wrote local history books about Nordhordland. He was decorated with the Royal Norwegian Order of St. Olav in 1954, and died in 1985 in Flosta Municipality.

Political offices
Preceded by Knut Liestøl	Minister of Education and Church Affairs; 1935–1945	Succeeded by Kåre Fostervoll
Government offices
Preceded by Eilif Løvrak Holmesland (acting governor)	County Governor of Aust-Agder; 1945–1961	Succeeded by Henrik Svensen
