= La Calabacita =

La Calabacita is an animated short that aired at the end of children's programming on Cuban television. The animation was a design prize created for the Cuban Institute of Radio and Television's 1976 "Es la hora de dormir" (It's time to sleep) contest by Marta Porro, who was then pregnant in the hospital with her first daughter, and premiered on television in February 1977, with a short produced by the ICRT Film Studios. La Calabacita featured the titular character, who lived in a pumpkin, which he had a head similar to, an idea suggested by documentary filmmaker Santiago Àlvarez, and would sprinkle magic powder on animals, kids, toys et al using a pillow.

Over the years, Calabacita segments have been directed by Felix Ricardo Rodriguez and sung by the likes of Miriam Ramos, Mayra de la Vega, Monica Sierra, Maggie Carles, and Liuba María Hevia.

== Plot and overview ==
Two versions of La Calabacita would air at different times. A version aimed at preschool children aired at 8PM, while the second was aimed at older children who would be at school an hour later. Many people have considered 8PM to be "the hour of the Calabacita." Back then, many people hated La Calabacita because it signaled bedtime. Today, everyone remembers it with affection. In the Summer season, a version of the Calabacita song about summer activities aired.

The most recent version of La Calabacita was "Travesia Magica" by Liuba María Hevia. The song has been included in some of her albums since then.

In 1981, the Calabacita starred in his own film titled Las 6 Maravillas and another in 1984 titled Suenos y Pesadillas. Both are produced by Tuilo Raggi.

La Calabacita is regarded part of Cuban broadcasting culture.
