= Podhradí (Jičín District) =

- Market town
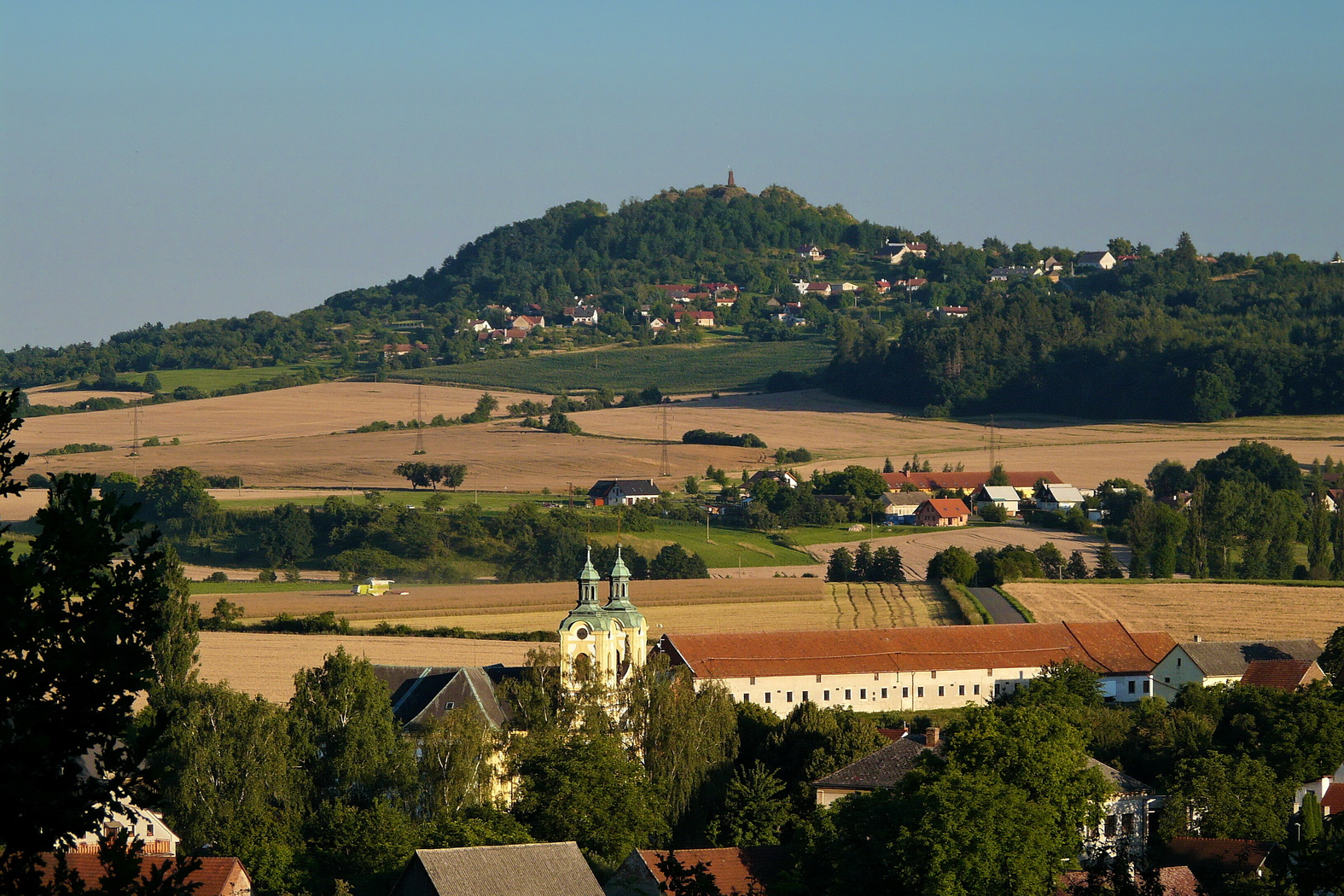
- View of Hlásná Lhota and Podhradí from the northwest

- Coat of arms

- Location in the Czech Republic
- Coordinates: 50°25′7″N 15°18′38″E
- Country: Czech Republic
- Region: Hradec Králové
- District: Jičín
- First mentioned: 1546

Area
  - Total: 10.28 km^{2} (3.97 sq mi)
- Elevation: 358 m (1,175 ft)

Population (2026-01-01)
  - Total: 500
  - Density: 49/km^{2} (130/sq mi)
- Time zone: UTC+1 (CET)
  - Summer (DST): UTC+2 (CEST)
- Postal code: 506 01
- Website: www.mestyspodhradi.cz

Podhradí (Czech pronunciation: [ˈpodɦraɟiː]) is a market town in Jičín District in the Hradec Králové Region of the Czech Republic. It has about 500 inhabitants.

== Administrative division ==
Podhradí consists of five municipal parts (in brackets population according to the 2021 census):

- Podhradí (95)
- Čejkovice (162)
- Hlásná Lhota (79)
- Šlikova Ves (115)
- Vokšice (42)

== Geography ==
Podhradí is located about 4 kilometres (2 mi) southwest of Jičín and 43 km (27 mi) northwest of Hradec Králové. It lies in the Jičín Uplands. The highest point is the hill Veliš at 429 m (1,407 ft) above sea level.

== History ==
The first written mention of Podhradí is from 1546.

== Demographics ==
Historical population

Year	Pop.	±%
1869	1,423	—
1880	1,375	−3.4%
1890	1,502	+9.2%
1900	1,530	+1.9%
1910	1,346	−12.0%

Year	Pop.	±%
1921	1,219	−9.4%
1930	1,017	−16.6%
1950	816	−19.8%
1961	737	−9.7%
1970	629	−14.7%

Year	Pop.	±%
1980	507	−19.4%
1991	407	−19.7%
2001	362	−11.1%
2011	439	+21.3%
2021	493	+12.3%

Source: Censuses

== Transport ==
The I/32 road from Jičín to Poděbrady runs through the eastern part of the municipal territory.

== Sights ==
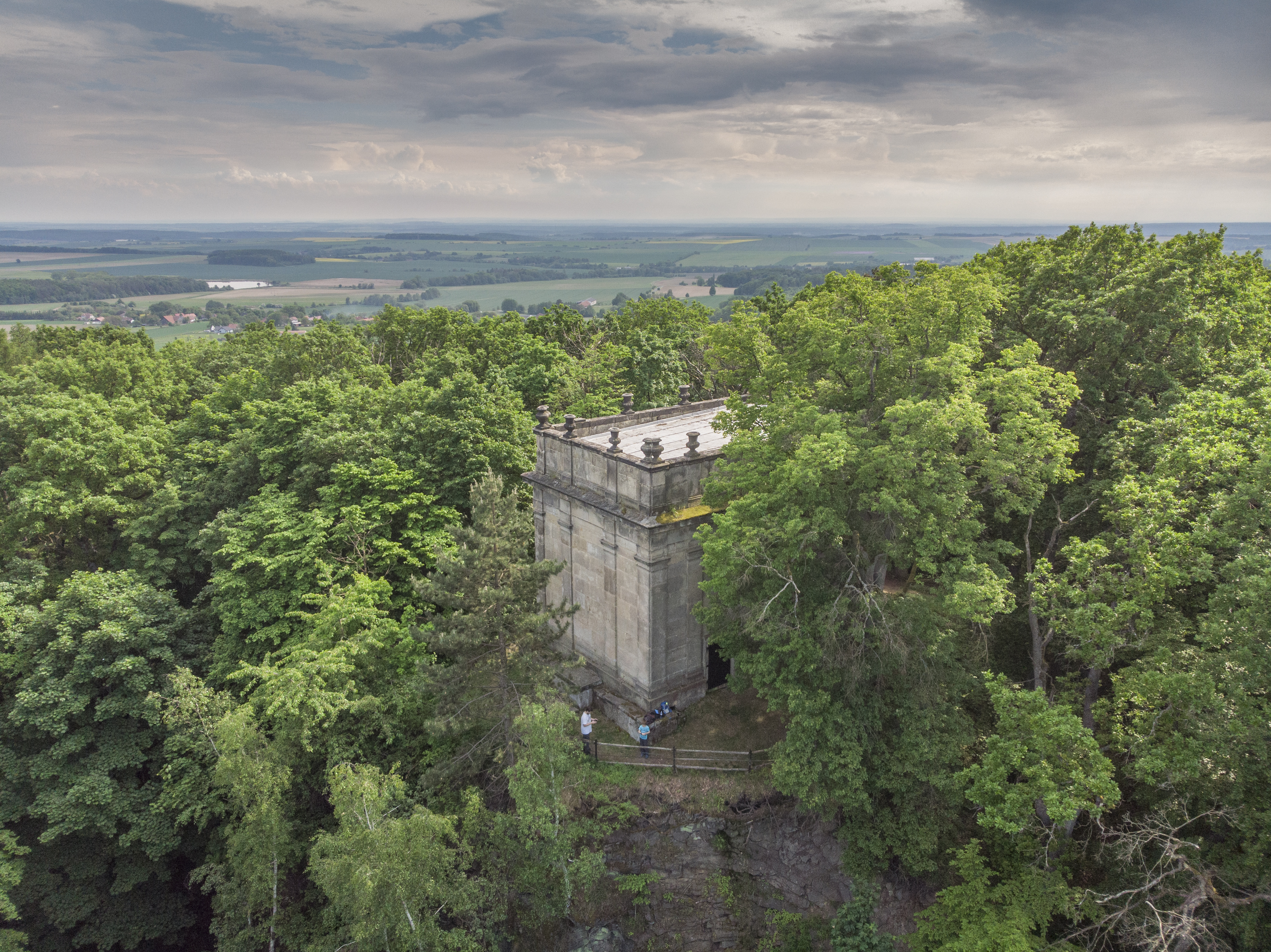
Loreto – Chapel of the Virgin Mary

On the hill Veliš is a ruin of the eponymous castle. Although the castle was one of the most important in the region in the Middle Ages, little information about it has been preserved. The castle was founded at the end of the 13th century and was abandoned after 1650. It had strong late Gothic outer fortifications that were among the best in the country at the time. Parts of it have survived to this day, as well as several fragments of the core.

Loreto – the Chapel of the Virgin Mary is located on a small hill in the woods near Podhradí. It was built in the Baroque style in 1694 by the Schlick family.

The Vokšice Castle was built in Vokšice at the end of the 17th century. The early Baroque building was later modified in the Empire style. The Chapel of Saint Rosalia was built next to the castle in the first half of the 19th century. Part of the castle complex is also a valuable granary, built in 1700 according to the design by Jean Baptiste Mathey.
