= TV Maci =

- Starring: TV Maci, Paprika Jancsi (toy doll)
- Composer: József Pécsi
- Country of origin: Hungary
- Original language: Hungarian

Production
- Running time: typically 4 minutes

Original release
- Release: 15 April 1963 – present

TV Maci (literally: TV Teddy) first appeared on Magyar Televízió (Hungarian Television) on April 15, 1963, serving as the opening sequence for the bedtime story program Esti mese (Evening Tale).

== History ==
The official birthday of TV Maci is celebrated on October 23, which is not the date of his first appearance on television,(which was on April 15, 1963), but rather the birthday of Ágnes Bálint, who wrote the original script for the Esti mese intro and created the character of the bear. The puppet figure was crafted by applied artist László Szabó.

=== 1963–1981 ===
The version of TV Maci from the 1960s and 70s was designed by Zsolt Lengyel and built by Tibor Köber. In the radio listings on April 15, 1963, viewers read: “From today, a little bear will also be listening to the evening tale!”

The show was introduced with the title: “Sweet dreams, children!” — which marked the first television appearance of the bear. Although the animation was still in black and white, TV Maci already brushed his teeth, sat in front of the television, and went to sleep after the story concluded. In 1970, Ágnes Bálint published a children's book titled Good Night, Maci!

The bear became so beloved that in 1980 he even accompanied Hungarian astronaut Bertalan Farkas into space, and together they told bedtime stories from orbit.

=== 1981–1983 ===
By 1981, it became evident that TV Maci and his surroundings needed a modern update. Designer Aurél Koch and director-animator Pál A. Tóth undertook the redesign. Maci’s toy, Valérka, was replaced by a cornhusk doll. Maci acquired a new wardrobe and redecorated his home. In keeping with the trends of the time, he also learned to play the guitar. Ágnes Bálint wrote another book about him, titled I Am TV Maci. The new apartment was designed by Márta Kende and her team.

Koch’s version of TV Maci was retired in 1983. Zoltán Rudi, then head of MTV, announced that the popular character needed a complete overhaul.

"I would definitely insist on keeping TV Maci! We flew together in zero gravity. I grew very fond of this character, and I believe many people in this country feel the same way," astronaut Bertalan Farkas said. Judit Endrei, on the other hand, would have made only minor changes.

=== 1983–present ===
The renewed TV Maci was created by Ottó Foky at the Pannónia Film Studio in 1982 using stop-motion puppet animation. The cornhusk doll was replaced by the figure of Paprika Jancsi.

In 1998, the MTV network removed the 1982 Foky version from programming, as the then program director deemed it outdated. The backlash was so strong that it returned to air on M2 after only six months.

=== 2012 ===
On April 15, 2012, the Foky version was removed once more and replaced with a newly redesigned TV Maci. In this version, he no longer watches TV alone in the evening — he now has a sibling and uses a computer, reflecting modern times. However, the new version was poorly received by both TV viewers and internet users, and after four months, it was replaced again by Ottó Foky’s earlier version.

=== Special Editions of TV Maci ===
- Holiday(s)
- National holiday(s)
- Birthday

== Music ==
Excerpts from Istók gazda's yard (Istók gazda udvarán) by József Pécsi were performed on bassoon by József Vajda.
