= Zdeněk Smetana =

- Born: 26 July 1925; Czechoslovakia
- Died: 25 February 2016 (aged 90); Prague, Czech Republic
- Known for: Director, animator, graphic artist

Zdeněk Smetana (26 July 1925 – 25 February 2016) was a Czechoslovak-born Czech animator and graphic artist who created more than 400 animated cartoons, including full-length feature films. He became known for a series of Czechoslovak animated children's television bedtime stories during the 1970s and 1980s, including The Little Witch (Malá čarodějnice), Fairy Tales of Moss and Fern (Pohádky z mechu a kapradí), Reedy (Rákosníček) and Štaflík a Špagetka. In 1981, Smetana's film, The End of A Cube, won a BAFTA award from the British Academy of Film and Television Arts. He also won awards from the Cannes Film Festival, the Berlin Film Festival and the Venice Film Festival.

In 1946, Smetana began working at the Bratři v triku animation studio, which had been founded by Jiri Trnka. He animated a sequence of the 1957 film, Creation of the World, in which the devil, Eve and others dance to rock 'n roll music. During the 1960s, Smetana animated episodes of Tom and Jerry, which was being produced at a studio in Prague at the time.

Smetana retired from full-time television animation in the late 1980s to focus on graphic art. He died in Prague on 25 February 2016, at the age of 90.
