= Jičín =

- Town
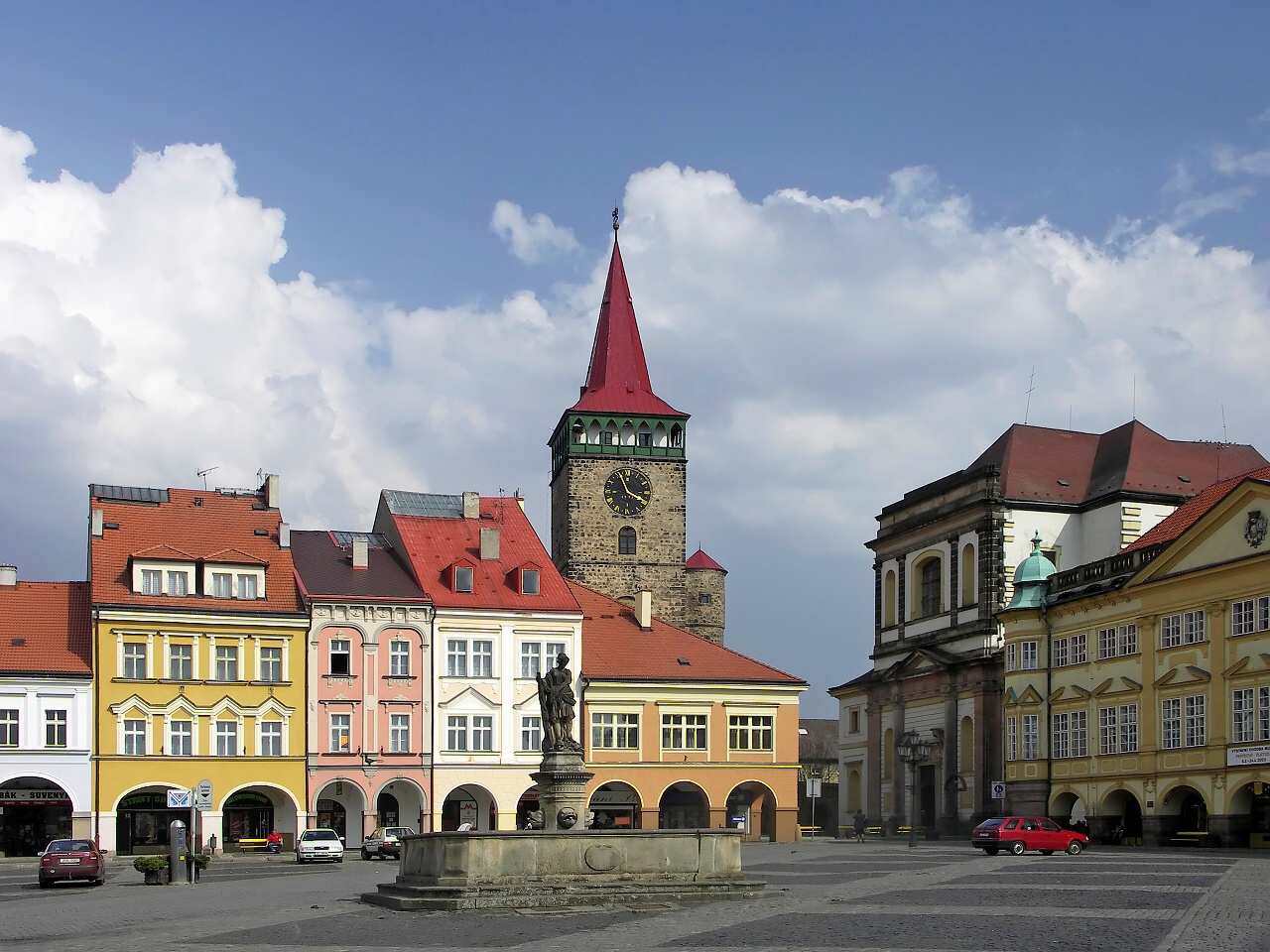
- The square Valdštejnovo náměstí

- Flag Coat of arms

- Location in the Czech Republic
- Coordinates: 50°26′12″N 15°21′6″E
- Country: Czech Republic
- Region: Hradec Králové
- District: Jičín
- First mentioned: 1293

Government
  - Mayor: Jan Zachoval

Area
  - Total: 25.88 km^{2} (9.99 sq mi)
- Elevation: 287 m (942 ft)

Population (2026-01-01)
  - Total: 16,052
  - Density: 620.2/km^{2} (1,606/sq mi)
- Time zone: UTC+1 (CET)
  - Summer (DST): UTC+2 (CEST)
- Postal code: 506 01
- Website: www.mujicin.cz

Jičín (Czech pronunciation: [ˈjɪtʃiːn]; German: Jitschin or Gitschin) is a town in the Hradec Králové Region of the Czech Republic. It has about 16,000 inhabitants. The town is located in the Jičín Uplands on the Cidlina River.

Jičín's history is connected with Albrecht von Wallenstein who had rebuilt the town, and many sights bear his name. The historic town centre is well preserved and is protected as an urban monument reservation. The town is connected with the fairy tale character Rumcajs and hosts a fairy tale-themed festival every year.

== Administrative division ==
Jičín consists of 12 municipal parts (in brackets population according to the 2021 census):

- Dvorce (33)
- Holínské Předměstí (2,013)
- Hubálov (68)
- Moravčice (18)
- Nové Město (4,659)
- Popovice (405)
- Pražské Předměstí (244)
- Robousy (548)
- Sedličky (216)
- Soudná (209)
- Staré Město (507)
- Valdické Předměstí (6,984)

== Etymology ==
The origin of the name Jičín is unknown, but according to the most probable hypotheses, it was derived from the German name of Queen Judith of Habsburg Guta, or from Dičín, derived from the Old Czech word dík (meaning 'wild boar', of which many lived here).

== Geography ==
Jičín is located about 41 kilometres (25 mi) northwest of Hradec Králové and 70 km (43 mi) northeast of Prague. It lies in the heart of the Jičín Uplands. The highest point is the hill Zebín at 399 m (1,309 ft) above sea level. The Cidlina River flows through the town. Several other small watercourses also flow through the municipal territory, including the streams Valdický potok, Popovický potok, Úlibický potok and Trnávka. There are five fishponds in the territory, the largest of which is Šibeňák. Ponds Kníže and Šibeňák are located right in the urban area.

Jičín is sometimes called "Gate to the Bohemian Paradise", however the territory of the Bohemian Paradise region begins beyond the borders of the Jičín municipal territory. In the northern part there are two nature monuments: Zebín (comprising the hill's peak) and Libosad-obora (comprising the whole Libosad park).

== History ==
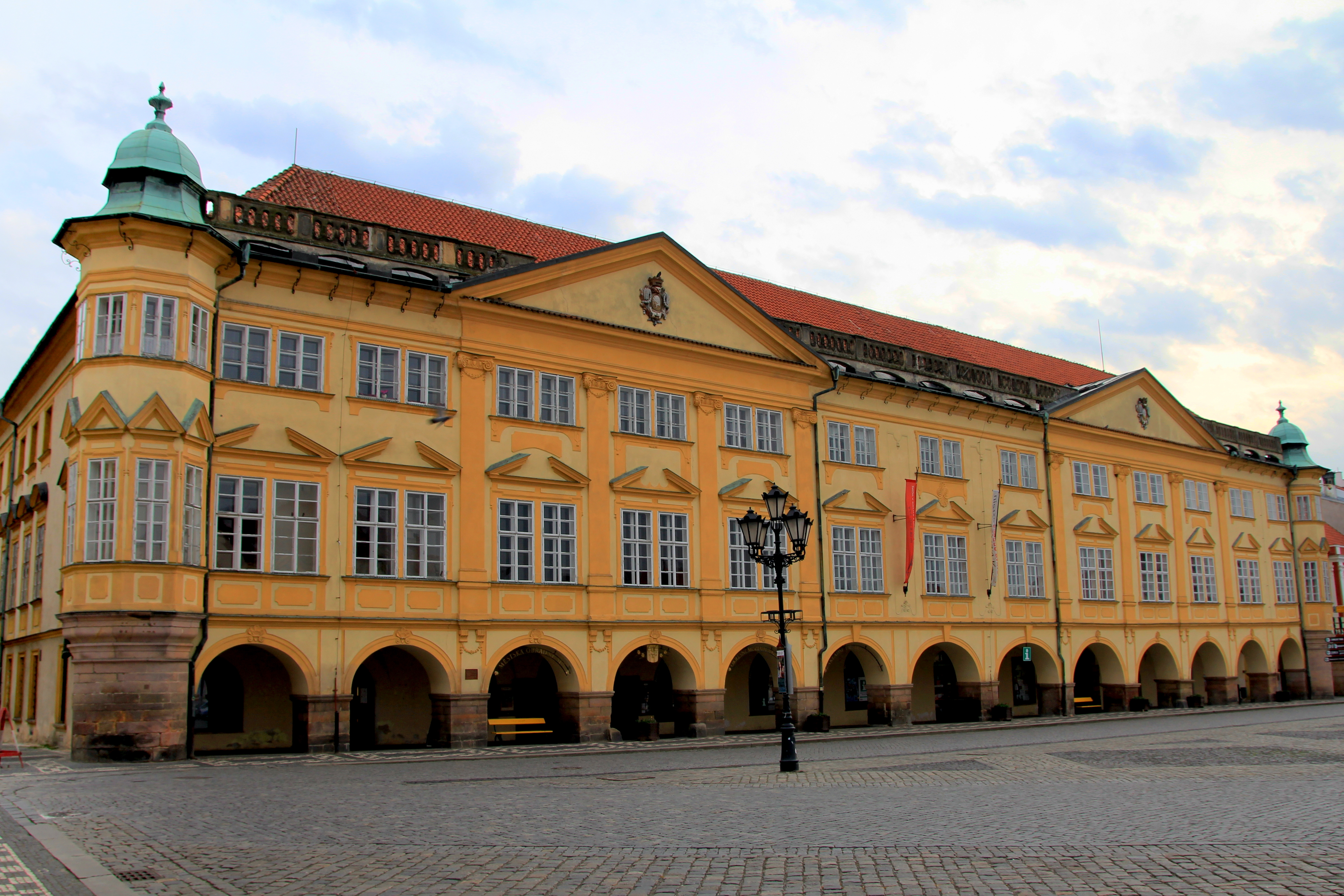
Valdštejnský Castle

The area of Jičín has been inhabited for almost 8,000 years thanks to the convenient geographical and climatic conditions. The settlement in the area of today's town is first mentioned in 1143 in deed of foundation of the Strahov Monastery. The town of Jičín was founded in the 13th century on the place of the village Staré Místo near the Veliš Castle. It was moved northward to its present location shortly afterward, which was better protected by the Cidlina River. The first written mention of Jičín comes from a document by Queen Judith of Habsburg, the wife of King Wenceslaus II of Bohemia, dated 1 August 1293. The town was built with a regular street layout around a rectangular square and was surrounded by wooden fortifications with reinforced bastions and a trench.

Jičín was first the royal town, but in 1337 King John of Bohemia sold it to the Wartenberg family, who owned it until the middle of the 15th century. The Hussite Wars did not affect the town much. During the 15th century, Jičín changed its lords several times until 1487, when it became a property of the House of Trčka of Lípa. With the succession of Vilém Trčka in 1540, the town began to be rebuilt in stone. The fortifications were rebuilt as well, with three gates connecting the centre with peripheries: the western Pražská Gate, the northern Holínská Gate, and the eastern Valdice Gate (1568–1578), which is the only one preserved today. After a large fire in 1572, most of the wooden houses were replaced by stone Renaissance buildings, often decorated with sgrafitti; the parish church was rebuilt as well. In 1587, Burjan Trčka had built a small castle. In 1607, Jičín was acquired by Zikmund Smiřický. The Smiřický family had built here a new larger castle, which replaced the castle of the Trčka family.

The biggest expansion of the town started in 1621 during the Thirty Years' War, when the town became a property of the generalissimo Albrecht von Wallenstein, who made it the centre of his Duchy of Friedland and minted his own coins there. Several architects worked for him, notably Giovanni de Galliano Pieroni, Giovanni Battista Marini, Andrea Spezza, and Nicolo Sebregondi. He had the castle and the Church of St. James rebuilt completely in the North-Italian style and connected them via a roofed footbridge. The town was to be rebuilt completely into a modern town with separated representative and craftsman parts. The parish Church of St. Ignatius together with the college was given to the Jesuits in 1627. Wallenstein also had a summer house with a court of honor, farm buildings, and a game park built in the northern part of the town near Valdice, and a linden alley along the path leading to the summer house. After the early death of Wallenstein in 1634, the town lost much of its importance.

In 1710 the town became a property of the Trauttmansdorff family, which meant the arrival of the period of High Baroque, during which many constructions were completed. Many statues and sculptures in the town today come from this period. In 1784, Jičín became the seat of a new region. During the first half of the 19th century, the town spread quickly, especially eastward.

The Battle of Gitschin was fought nearby during the Austro-Prussian War of 1866.

Until 1918, the town was part of Austria-Hungary, head of the Jicin – Jičín District, one of the 94 Bezirkshauptmannschaften in Bohemia.

In 2019, the village of Hubálov, originally part of Tuř, was joined to Jičín. The transfer of the entire cadastral territory is unique in the modern history of the country.

== Demographics ==
Historical population

Year	Pop.	±%
1869	8,129	—
1880	9,702	+19.4%
1890	10,024	+3.3%
1900	11,572	+15.4%
1910	12,032	+4.0%

Year	Pop.	±%
1921	12,134	+0.8%
1930	12,828	+5.7%
1950	12,611	−1.7%
1961	13,277	+5.3%
1970	13,497	+1.7%

Year	Pop.	±%
1980	16,243	+20.3%
1991	16,850	+3.7%
2001	16,531	−1.9%
2011	16,864	+2.0%
2021	15,904	−5.7%

Source: Censuses (Note: Including Hubálov, which was part of Tuř until 2019.)

== Transport ==
Jičín lies at the crossroad of two main road: the I/16 (the section from Mladá Boleslav to Trutnov) and the I/35 (the section from Liberec to Hradec Králové). The I/32 road splits from the I/16 and connects Jičín with the D1 motorway.

Jičín is located on the railway lines Prague–Turnov and Hradec Králové–Turnov.

== Culture ==
Jičín is connected with the popular fairy tale character, Robin Hood-like robber Rumcajs. The town hosts the annual festival called "Jičín – The Town of Fairy Tale", established in 1990.

== Sights ==
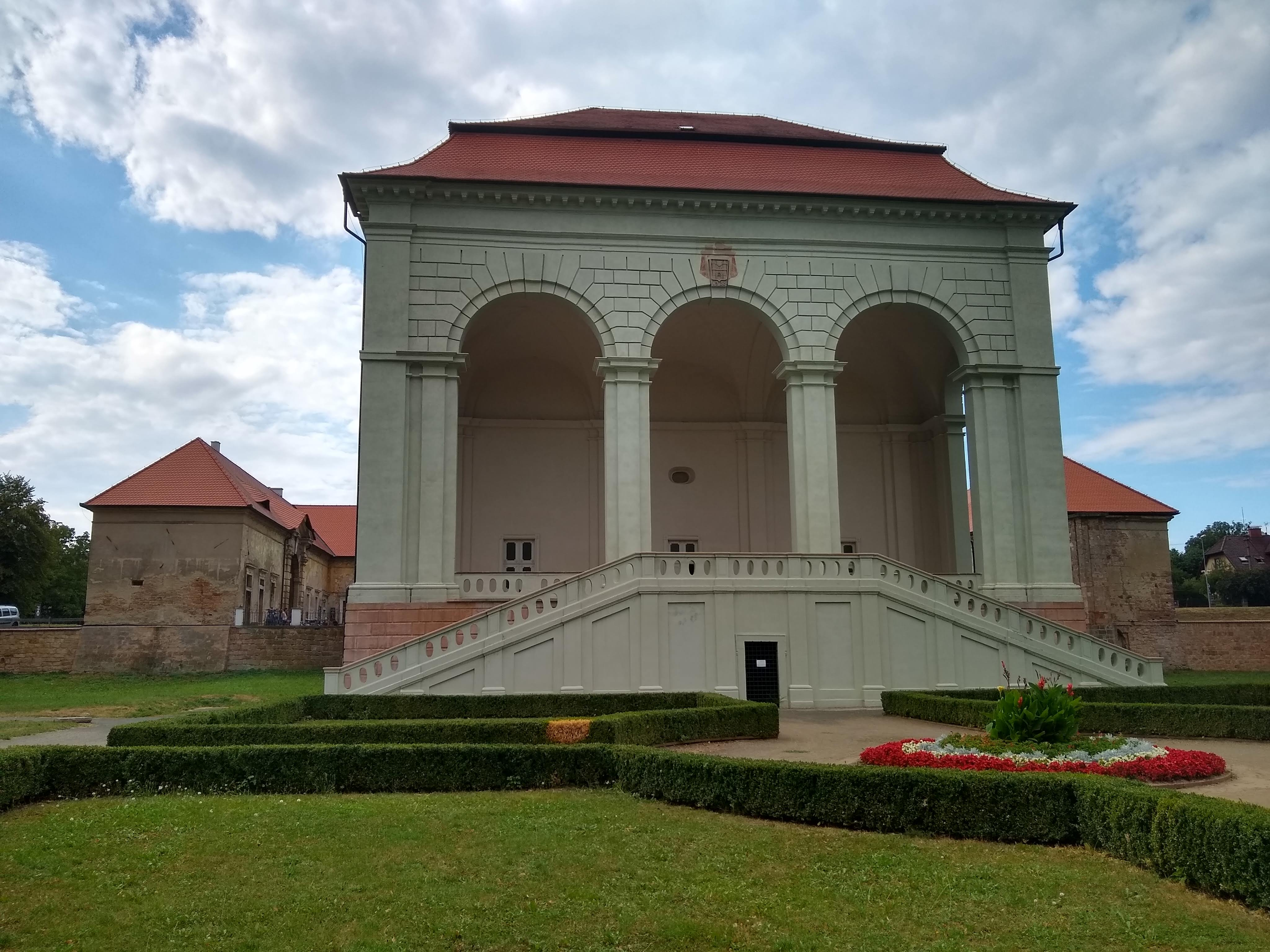
The loggia in the Libosad park

The historic centre is built around a rectangular square with a regular Gothic street layout, remnants of fortifications and arcade Renaissance and Baroque houses.

The historic core is formed by the square Valdštejnovo náměstí, where is the Valdštejnský Castle. The castle houses the Regional Museum and Gallery, a library and a primary art school, among others. There is also a castle park. Next to the castle is the Church of Saint James the Great. The church, intended as a seat of a never-established bishopric, has never been completed, so it lacks a spire and a cupola.

North of the town is the Baroque summer house of Albrecht von Wallenstein called Valdštejnská lodžie ('Wallenstein's loggia'). The original game park around it is nowadays a park called Libosad. The loggia is connected with the town by a 1.7 kilometres (1.1 mi)-long alley of linden trees. The loggia, the park and the alley together with the town centre are parts of so-called Wallenstein's Baroque composed landscape (designed landscape axes connecting sacral buildings, landscape landmarks and the town) which was unfinished due to early death of von Wallenstein.

There are several Jewish sights in the town. The most notable is the former synagogue, which was first documented in 1773.

== Notable people ==
- Jacob Bassevi (1580–1634), Jewish court financier
- Albrecht von Wallenstein (1583–1634), generalissimo and town lord
- Josef Gočár (1880–1945), architect
- František Kaván (1866–1941), painter and poet
- Karl Kraus (1874–1936), writer
- Vlastislav Hofman (1884–1964), artist and architect
- Josef Váchal (1884–1969), writer and painter
- Jaroslav Řezáč (1886–1974), ice hockey player
- Luděk Frýbort (1933–2019), writer
- Michal Suchánek (born 1965), actor and comedian
- Miluše Bittnerová (born 1977), actress
- Jana Plodková (born 1981), actress
- Jaroslav Soukup (born 1982), biathlete

== Twin towns – sister cities ==
Jičín is twinned with:

- Erbach im Odenwald, Germany
- Martin, Slovakia
- Świdnica County, Poland

== Gallery ==
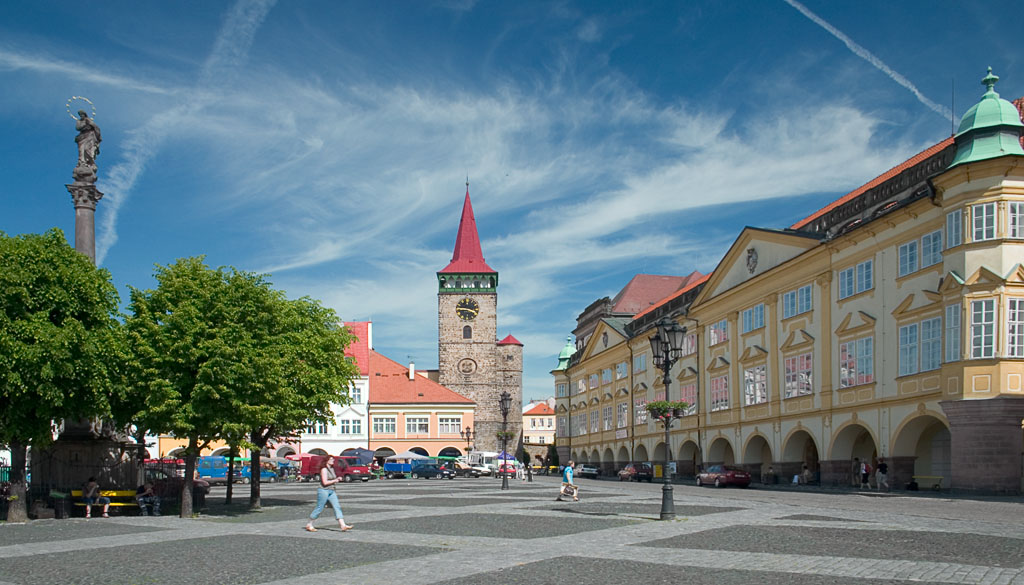
Valdštejnovo Square with the Valdice Gate and the castle

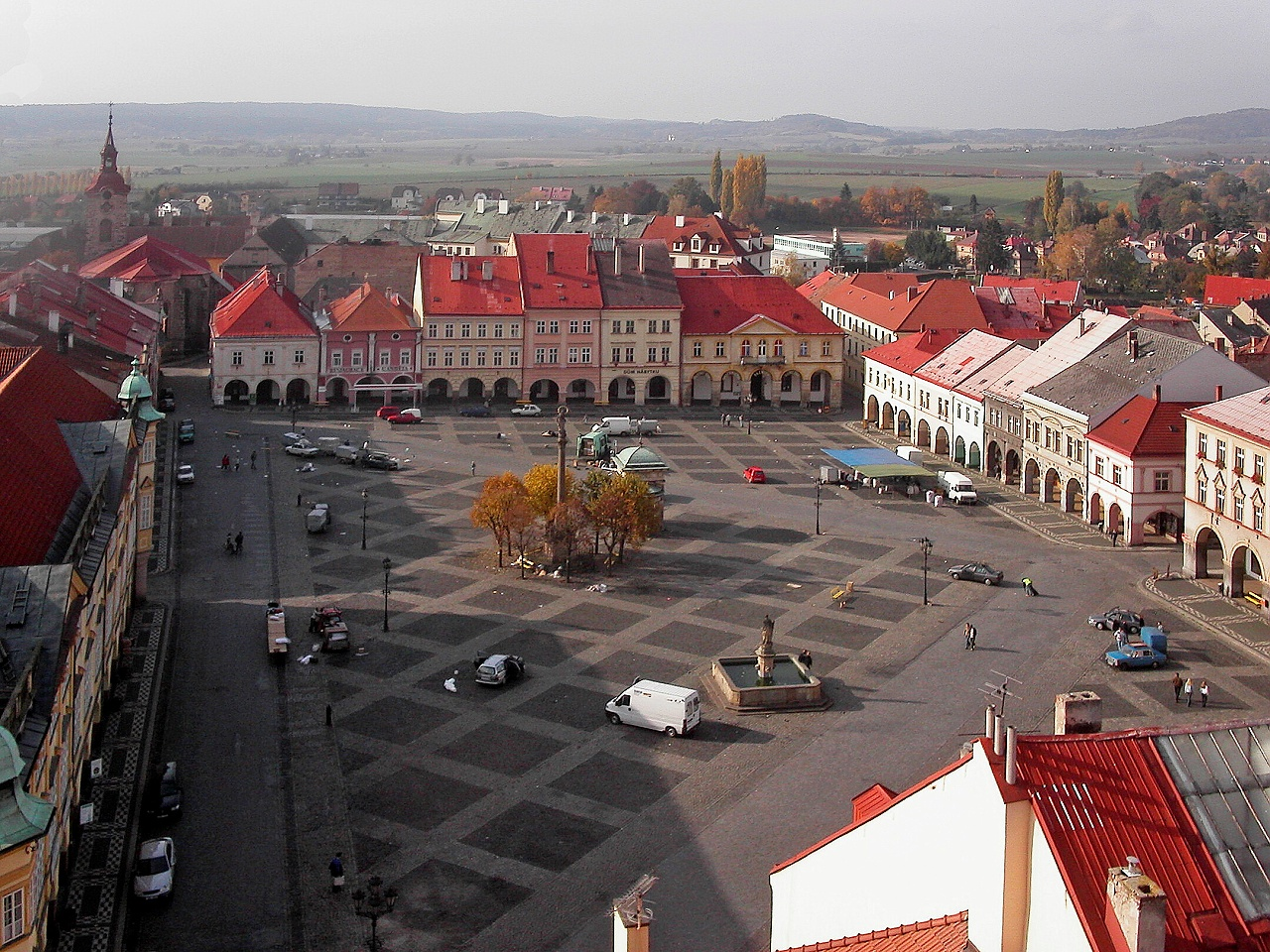
View of the Valdštejnovo náměstí from the Valdice Gate

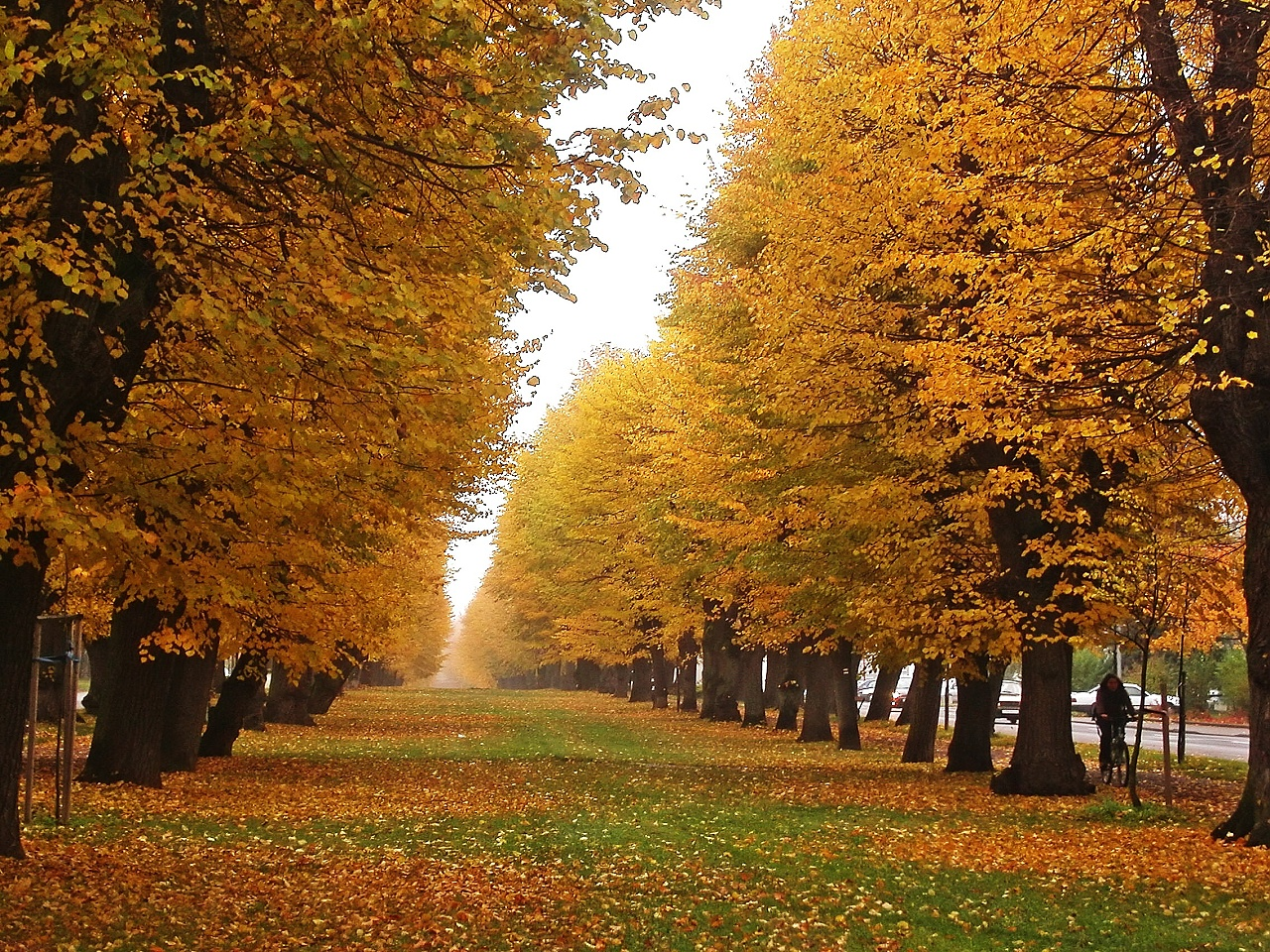
Linden alley connecting the Libosad park with the centre

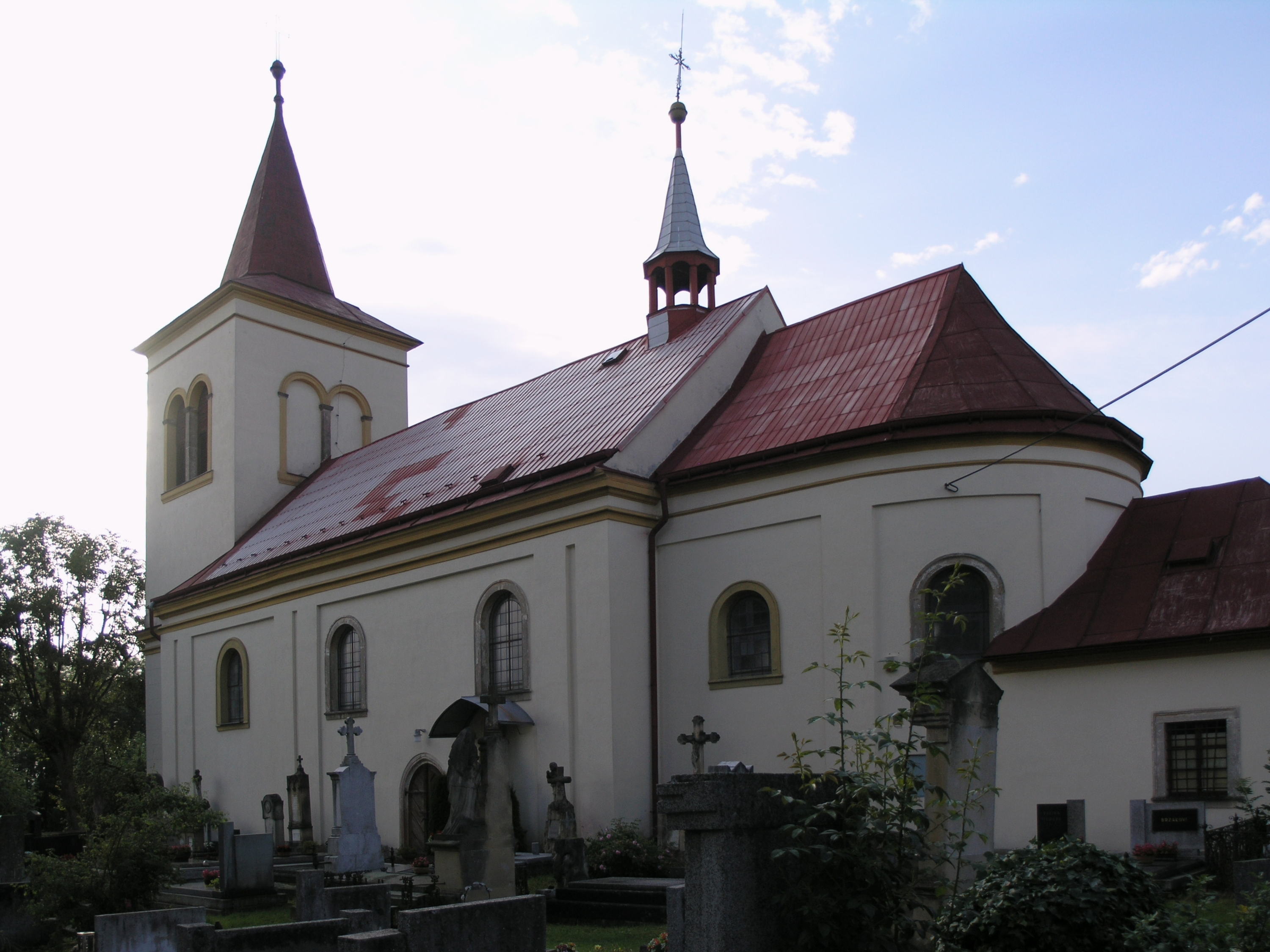
Church of the Finding of the Holy Cross in Robousy
