= 2012 in animation =

2012 in animation is an overview of notable events, including notable awards, list of films released, television show debuts and endings, and notable deaths.

== Events ==
=== January ===
- January 5: Total Drama's fourth season series Total Drama: Revenge of the Island premieres on Teletoon in Canada. This season/series features a completely brand new cast of campers than the ones from the three previous seasons. Revenge of the Island later premiered on Cartoon Network in the US on June 5.
- January 15: The Family Guy episode "The Blind Side" premieres on Fox. The episode became well known for two things, the running gag of Peter falling down the stairs while swearing and the poses he made after falling down them, which became an iconic meme about a decade later (which was dubbed as "Family Guy Death Pose").

=== February ===
- February 4: The 39th Annie Awards are held.
- February 7: The Looney Tunes Show concludes its first season on Cartoon Network with the episode "Point, Laser Point". The season's finale was seen by over 1.5 million viewers that night.
- February 13: Adventure Time concludes its third season on Cartoon Network.
- February 14: Matt Groening receives a star at the Hollywood Walk of Fame.
- February 17: Secret Mountain Fort Awesome aired new episodes for the last time on Cartoon Network due to the channel cancelling it cause of its low ratings, crude aesthetic, and disgusting toilet humor. The show released its remaining episodes on ITunes the following month.
  - After the show's conclusion, Peter Browngardt would finally begin development on his original idea pitch, Uncle Grandpa.
- February 19: The 500th episode of The Simpsons, "At Long Last Leave", is first broadcast, guest starring Julian Assange.
- February 26: 84th Academy Awards:
  - Rango by Gore Verbinski wins the Academy Award for Best Animated Feature.
  - The Fantastic Flying Books of Mr. Morris Lessmore by William Joyce and Brandon Oldenburg wins the Academy Award for Best Animated Short Film.

=== March ===
- March 2: The Lorax, based on the 1971 Dr. Seuss book of the same name, premieres, receiving mediocre reviews during the release. However, it garnered popularity online as an Internet meme a decade later.
- March 11: Season 2 of Bob's Burgers begins on Fox with the premiere of the episode "The Belchies"
- March 13:
  - Scooby-Doo! Music of the Vampire is officially released. Prior to date, it was originally a digital rental on Amazon Video and iTunes in late December 2011.
  - The Amazing World of Gumball concluded its first season on Cartoon Network.
- March 14: Season 16 of South Park begins on Comedy Central with the premiere of the episode "Reverse Cowgirl". It was seen by over 2.6 million viewers that night.
- March 23: Disney Junior launches as a 24/7 channel.
- March 25: Edd Gould, the creator of Eddsworld, dies from Leukemia. The episode "Space Face" was set to be released. But because of Gould's death, it was delayed. After Space Face Part 1 was uploaded, Tomska started a campaign on Kickstarter called Eddsworld Legacy. But it got removed on YouTube. The 5 retro/classic YouTube videos on YouTube were taken down for copyright in 2013 before they were reuploaded on Eddsworld Extra three years later.
- March 31: The Penguins of Madagascar concludes its second season on Nickelodeon with the episodes "Alienated/The Most Dangerous Game Night".

=== April ===
- April 2: Season 4 of Adventure Time begins on Cartoon Network, with the premiere of the episode "Hot to the Touch" (which follows up from right after the events of Season 3's finale "Incendium").
- April 12: Total Drama: Revenge of the Island aired its final episode on Teletoon in Canada, thus concluding the fourth season of Total Drama. The season later concluded in the US on Cartoon Network on August 28.
- April 14: The first episode of The Legend of Korra, the sequel to Avatar: The Last Airbender, premieres on Nickelodeon.
- April 15: The Simpsons episode "Beware My Cheating Bart" is first broadcast, with the couch gag being animated by Bill Plympton, the first time he did so.
- April 16: The third & final season of The Penguins of Madagascar begins on Nickelodeon with the premiere of the episode "Feline Fervor".

=== May ===
- May 3: Carlos Loiseau's Ánima Buenos Aires premieres.
- May 13:
- Season 2 of T.U.F.F. Puppy begins on Nickelodeon with the premiere of the episodes "Freaky Spy Day/Dog Tired".
- American Dad! concludes its eighth season on Fox with the episode "Toy Whorey". The season's finale was seen by over 4.1 million viewers that night.
- May 20:
  - The Cleveland Show concludes its third season on Fox with the episode "All You Can Eat". The season's finale was seen by just over 3 million viewers that night.
  - The Simpsons concludes its 23rd season on Fox with the episode "Lisa Goes Gaga", which guest stars pop singer Lady Gaga. This episode was panned by critics along with Simpsons fans and Lady Gaga fans and is often considered to be one of the worst Simpsons episodes of all time. Despite its negative reception, the season's finale was seen by over 4.8 million viewers that night.
  - Bob's Burgers concludes its second season on Fox with the episode "Beefsquatch". The season's finale was seen by over 3.5 million viewers that night.
  - Family Guy concludes its tenth season on Fox with the following episodes:
    - "Family Guy Viewer Mail #2"
    - "Internal Affairs"
      - Both episodes were seen by over 5.3 million viewers that night.
- May 26: Toonami relaunches as Adult Swim.
- May 27: T.U.F.F. Puppy concludes its first season on Nickelodeon with the episodes "Lie Like a Dog/Cold Fish".

=== June ===
- June 8: The third Madagascar film, Madagascar 3: Europe's Most Wanted, is released by DreamWorks Animation & Paramount Pictures.
- June 15:
  - The first episode of Gravity Falls premieres on Disney Channel, receiving generally favorable reviews.
  - Threshold Entertainment's Foodfight! premieres in United Kingdom as a limited release. This film received extremely negative reviews for its unfinished looking CG animation, Nazi-based propaganda, and sexual innuendo, declaring this as one of the worst animated films ever made.
- June 20: Season 7 of Futurama begins on Comedy Central with the premiere of the episode "The Bots and the Bees". The season's premiere was seen by over 1.5 million viewers that night.
- June 22: Brave, produced by the Walt Disney Company and Pixar, is released.
- June 23: The Legend of Korra concludes its first season on Nickelodeon with the episodes "Skeletons in the Closet" and "Endgame". The season's finale was viewed by 3.7 million viewers that night.

=== July ===
- July 13: Blue Sky Studios releases Ice Age: Continental Drift, directed by Steve Martino and Michael Thurmeier.
- July 21: Season 9 of SpongeBob SquarePants begins on Nickelodeon with the premiere of the episodes "Extreme Spots/Squirrel Record", the season's premiere was seen by a total of over 3.6 million viewers that night. Beginning with the season, episodes start being produced in High-definition.

=== August ===
- August 7: Season 2 of The Amazing World of Gumball begins on Cartoon Network, with the premiere of the episode "The Remote".
- August 15: Johnny Test concludes its fifth season on Cartoon Network with the episode "Green Johnny".
- August 20: Cookie Jar Entertainment was acquired by DHX Media for $111 million, which made DHX the world's largest independent owner of children's television programming. Cookie Jar was later folded on December 25, 2014.
- August 24: Don Hertzfeldt's It's Such a Beautiful Day premiers.
- August 25: Toonzai is replaced by Vortexx.

=== September ===
- September 3:
  - The first episode of Daniel Tiger's Neighborhood airs.
  - Regular Show concludes its third season on Cartoon Network.
- September 8: The Scooby-Doo film Big Top Scooby-Doo! premieres on Cartoon Network, later released on DVD, Blu-ray, & digital services on October 9.
- September 11: Cartoon Network greenlights two new original shows for its lineup: Steven Universe and Uncle Grandpa.
- September 20: Tim Burton's Frankenweenie is released.
- September 28:
  - Teenage Mutant Ninja Turtles premieres on Nickelodeon.
  - Hotel Transylvania, a film by Columbia Pictures and Sony Pictures Animation is released.
- September 30:
  - Season 24 of The Simpsons begins on Fox with the premiere of the episode "Moonshine River", which features the following guest stars: Ken Burns, Zooey Deschanel, Sarah Michelle Gellar, Anne Hathaway, Maurice LaMarche, Don Pardo, Natalie Portman, Kevin Michael Richardson, Al Roker and Sarah Silverman. The season's premiere was seen by over 8 million viewers that night.
  - Season 3 of Bob's Burgers begins on Fox with the premiere of the episode "Ear-sy Rider". The season's premiere was seen by over 5.4 million viewers that night.
  - Season 11 of Family Guy begins on Fox with the premiere of the episode "Into Fat Air", guest starring Elizabeth Banks and Martin Spanjers. The season's premiere was seen by over 6.5 million viewers that night.
  - Season 9 of American Dad! begins on Fox with the premiere of the episode "Love, AD Style". The season's premiere was seen by over 5.2 million viewers that night.

=== October ===
- October 1: Cartoon Network celebrates its 20th anniversary with a marathon of party-themed episodes, the marathon leads up to Regular Show's Season 4 premiere, the half-hour special "Exit 9B".
- October 2: The second & final season of The Looney Tunes Show begins on Cartoon Network with the premiere of the episode "Bobcats on Three!".
- October 7: The 4th & final season of The Cleveland Show begins on Fox with the premiere of the episode "Escape from Goochland". The season's premiere was seen by over 4.4 million viewers that night.
- October 12: Cartoon Network renews Adventure Time for a fifth season (which premiered exactly a month later).
- October 22: Adventure Time concludes its fourth season on Cartoon Network with the premiere of the episode "The Lich", which leaves the show on a cliffhanger.

=== November ===
- November 2:
  - The Walt Disney Company releases Wreck-It Ralph.
  - Phineas and Ferb's 100th episode "This Is Your Backstory" premieres on Disney Channel. It seen by 2.78 million viewers that night.
- November 7: South Park concludes its 16th season on Comedy Central with the episode "Obama Wins!". It was seen by over 2.1 million viewers that night.
- November 10:
  - The first episode of Littlest Pet Shop is broadcast.
  - The Penguins of Madagascar episodes "Marble Jarhead/Goodnight and Good Chuck" premiere. These were the final episodes to air on Nickelodeon, as the remaining episodes of the show would begin to air on Nicktoons the following year.
- November 12: Season 5 of Adventure Time begins on Cartoon Network with the premiere of the two-part episodes "Finn the Human/Jake the Dog", which follows up from the events of Season 4's finale "The Lich".
- November 21: Rise of the Guardians, a film by DreamWorks is released.
- November 23: The SpongeBob SquarePants Christmas special "It's a SpongeBob Christmas!" premieres on CBS, thus concluding the eighth season of the show. It later aired on Nickelodeon on December 6.
- November 30: Phineas and Ferb concludes its third season on Disney Channel with the premiere of the episode "Blackout!". The season's finale brought in a total of over 2 million viewers that night.

=== December ===
- December 7: Season 4 of Phineas and Ferb begins on Disney Channel with the premiere of the episodes "For Your Ice Only/Happy New Year!". The season's premiere brought in a total of 3.7 million viewers that night.
- December 12: Cartoon Network greenlights another new upcoming series for its lineup, with it being Clarence.

== Awards ==
- Academy Award for Best Animated Feature: Rango
- Academy Award for Best Animated Short Film: The Fantastic Flying Books of Mr. Morris Lessmore
- Animation Kobe Feature Film Award: K-On!
- Annecy International Animated Film Festival Cristal du long métrage: Crulic: The Path to Beyond
- Annie Award for Best Animated Feature: Wreck-It Ralph
- Asia Pacific Screen Award for Best Animated Feature Film: A Letter to Momo
- BAFTA Award for Best Animated Film: Brave
- César Award for Best Animated Film: Ernest & Celestine
- European Film Award for Best Animated Film: Alois Nebel
- Golden Globe Award for Best Animated Feature Film: Brave
- Goya Award for Best Animated Film: Tad, The Lost Explorer
- Japan Academy Prize for Animation of the Year: Wolf Children
- Japan Media Arts Festival Animation Grand Prize: Combustible
- Mainichi Film Award for Best Animation Film: Wolf Children

== Television series debuts ==
Date	Title	Channel	Year
January 8	YooHoo & Friends	Cartoon Network Latin America	2012
January 15	Napoleon Dynamite	Fox	2012
January 19	Unsupervised	FX	2012
February 18	Pokémon: BW: Rival Destinies	Cartoon Network	2012–2013
February 23	Monsuno	Nicktoons, TV Tokyo	2012–2014
March 3	The Aquabats! Super Show!	The Hub	2012–2014
March 23	Doc McStuffins	Disney Junior	2012–2020
March 30	Cartoon Planet	Cartoon Network	1995–1998; 2012–2014
April 1	Ultimate Spider-Man	Disney XD	2012–2017
April 7	Kuroko's Basketball	MBS, Tokyo MX, BS11	2012–2015
April 12	Kids on the Slope	Fuji TV	2012
April 14	The Legend of Korra	Nickelodeon	2012–2014
April 22	Hyouka	CTC, TVS, TVQ, tvk, KBS, Sun TV, GBS, Tokyo MX, MTV, BS11	2012
April 27	Wild Grinders	Nicktoons	2012–2015
April 30	Motorcity	Disney XD	2012–2013
May 5	Kaijudo	The Hub	2012–2013
May 18	Tron: Uprising	Disney XD	2012–2013
June 2	Care Bears: Welcome to Care-a-Lot	The Hub	2012
June 15	Gravity Falls	Disney Channel, Disney XD	2012–2016
July 7	Sword Art Online	Tokyo MX, Toonami	2012–2020
July 15	Black Dynamite	Adult Swim	2012–2015
August 1	Ben 10: Omniverse	Cartoon Network	2012–2014
August 4	Robot and Monster	Nickelodeon	2012–2015
August 7	DreamWorks Dragons	Cartoon Network, Netflix	2012–2018
August 13	Randy Cunningham: 9th Grade Ninja	Disney XD	2012–2015
September 3	Daniel Tiger's Neighborhood	PBS Kids	2012–2025
September 25	Brickleberry	Comedy Central	2012–2015
September 28	Teenage Mutant Ninja Turtles	Nickelodeon	2012–2017
October 6	JoJo's Bizarre Adventure	Tokyo MX, Toonami	2012–present
October 12	Psycho-Pass	Fuji TV	2012–2019
October 15	Slugterra	Disney XD, WildBrainTV, Netflix	2012–2016
November 8	Bravest Warriors	Cartoon Hangover/Teletoon	2012–2018
November 10	Littlest Pet Shop	The Hub	2012–2016
November 24	The Chica Show	Universal Kids	2012–2014
November 30	SuperF*ckers	Cartoon Hangover	2012–2014
December 14	Peter Rabbit	Nick Jr., CBeebies	2012–2016

== Television series endings ==
Date	Title	Channel	Year	Notes
January 7	Pokémon: Black & White	Cartoon Network	2011–2012	Ended
January 9	The Adventures of Chuck and Friends	The Hub	2010–2012	Ended
January 26	Bakugan Battle Brawlers	TV Tokyo, Cartoon Network, Teletoon	2007–2012	Ended
February 17	Secret Mountain Fort Awesome	Cartoon Network	2011–2012	Ended
February 24	Postcards from Buster	PBS Kids Go!	2004–2012	Ended
February 25	Rated A for Awesome	YTV	2011–2012	Cancelled
March 4	Napoleon Dynamite	Fox	2012	Cancelled
March 25	Mary Shelley's Frankenhole	Adult Swim	2010–2012	Cancelled
March 29	Secret Mountain Fort Awesome	iTunes	2011–2012	Cancelled
March 31	Ben 10: Ultimate Alien	Cartoon Network	2010–2012	Ended
April 25	Voltron Force	Nicktoons	2011–2012	Cancelled
April 25	Ugly Americans	Comedy Central	2010–2012	Cancelled
May 17	Special Agent Oso	Disney Junior	2009–2012	Ended
May 25	The Amazing Spiez!	TF1, Teletoon, Disney Channel Asia	2009–2012	Ended
June 16	ThunderCats	Cartoon Network	2011–2012	Cancelled
July 9	Hero: 108	Cartoon Network	2010–2012	Cancelled
July 13	The Ricky Gervais Show	HBO, Channel 4	2010–2012	Cancelled
July 25	Iron Man: Armored Adventures	France 2, France 4	2009–2012	Cancelled
August 25	League of Super Evil	YTV	2009–2012	Cancelled
October 26	Jungle Junction	Disney Junior	2009–2012	Ended
November 2	Fanboy & Chum Chum	Nickelodeon	2009–2012	Ended
November 8	Casper's Scare School	TF1	2009–2012	Ended
December 2	Kick Buttowski: Suburban Daredevil	Disney XD	2010–2012	Ended
December 2	Have a Laugh!	Disney Channel	2009–2012	Ended
December 8	Care Bears: Welcome to Care-a-Lot	The Hub	2012	Ended
December 20	Unsupervised	FX	2012	Ended

== Television season premieres ==
Date	Title	Season	Channel
January 5	Total Drama	4	Teletoon (Note: Season later premiered in the US on Cartoon Network on June 5th.)
March 11	Bob's Burgers	2	Fox
March 14	South Park	16	Comedy Central
April 2	Adventure Time	4	Cartoon Network
April 16	The Penguins of Madagascar	3	Nickelodeon
May 13	T.U.F.F. Puppy	2	Nickelodeon
May 28	Mad	3	Cartoon Network
June 20	Futurama	7	Comedy Central
July 21	SpongeBob SquarePants	9	Nickelodeon
August 7	The Amazing World of Gumball	2	Cartoon Network
September 17	Robot Chicken	6	Adult Swim
September 30	American Dad!	9	Fox
September 30	Bob's Burgers	3	Fox
September 30	Family Guy	11	Fox
September 30	The Simpsons	24	Fox
October 1	Regular Show	4	Cartoon Network
October 2	The Looney Tunes Show	2	Cartoon Network
October 7	The Cleveland Show	4	Fox
November 5	Mickey Mouse Clubhouse	4	Disney Jr. (Disney Channel)
November 12	Adventure Time	5	Cartoon Network
December 7	Phineas and Ferb	4	Disney Channel (Note: Season premiered on Disney XD on December 31st.)

== Television season finales ==
Date	Title	Season	Channel
January 15	Robot Chicken	5	Adult Swim
February 7	The Looney Tunes Show	1	Cartoon Network
February 13	Adventure Time	3	Cartoon Network
March 13	The Amazing World of Gumball	1	Cartoon Network
March 31	The Penguins of Madagascar	2	Nickelodeon
April 12	Total Drama	4	Teletoon (Note: Season later concluded in the US on Cartoon Network on August 28th.)
April 23	Mad	2	Cartoon Network
May 13	American Dad!	8	Fox
May 20	Bob's Burgers	2	Fox
May 20	The Cleveland Show	3	Fox
May 20	Family Guy	10	Fox
May 20	The Simpsons	23	Fox
May 27	T.U.F.F. Puppy	1	Nickelodeon
August 5	The Fairly OddParents	7	Nickelodeon
August 15	Johnny Test	5	Cartoon Network
September 3	Regular Show	3	Cartoon Network
September 28	Mickey Mouse Clubhouse	3	Disney Jr. (Disney Channel)
October 22	Adventure Time	4	Cartoon Network
November 7	South Park	16	Comedy Central
November 23	SpongeBob SquarePants	8	CBS (Note: Season later concluded on Nickelodeon on December 6th.)
November 30	Phineas and Ferb	3	Disney Channel (Note: Season concluded on Disney XD on December 8th.)

== Births ==
=== February ===
- February 6: Kai Zen, American child actress (voice of River in The Rocketeer, Pepper in Eureka!, young Luthera in Kung Fu Panda: The Dragon Knight, young Anne Boonchuy in the Amphibia episode "Lost in Newtopia").

=== April ===
- April 23: Alan Kim, American child actor (voice of Nano in PAW Patrol: The Mighty Movie, Kyong Won in Mickey Mouse Funhouse, Ben in Monsters at Work).

== Deaths ==
=== January ===
- January 6:
  - Tom Ardolino, American rock drummer and member of NRBQ (voiced himself in The Simpsons episodes "The Old Man and the "C" Student", "Take My Wife, Sleaze" and "Insane Clown Poppy"), dies from diabetes at age 56.
  - Bob Holness, British-South African radio and television presenter and occasional actor (voice of Mr. Formal in the Rex the Runt episode "Adventures on Telly 1") dies at age 83.
- January 14: Star Wirth, American xerographer (Hanna-Barbera, The Pagemaster, Warner Bros. Animation), dies at age 71.
- January 16: Efron Etkin, Israeli actor (dub voice of Piglet in Winnie the Pooh and Dolf in Alfred J. Kwak), dies at age 59.
- January 22: Dick Tufeld, American actor, announcer, and narrator (announcer and narrator for Spider-Man and His Amazing Friends, Spider-Woman, Super Friends: The Legendary Super Powers Show, The Super Powers Team: Galactic Guardians, Fantastic Four, and Histeria!, voiced the Robot from Lost in Space in The Simpsons episodes "Mayored to the Mob" and "Milhouse Doesn't Live Here Anymore"), dies at age 85.
- January 26: Ian Abercrombie, English actor (voice of Palpatine in Star Wars: The Clone Wars, F in The Grim Adventures of Billy & Mandy episode "Scythe 2.0", Ambrose in Rango, Ganthet in Green Lantern: The Animated Series), dies at age 77.

=== February ===
- February 6: Peter Breck, American actor (voice of Farmer Brown in The New Batman Adventures episode "Critters"), dies at age 82.
- February 8: Laurie Main, Australian actor (voice of Farmer Grey, Squire Douglas Gordon, and Pipe Smoking Stable Owner in Black Beauty, narrator in Winnie the Pooh Discovers the Seasons, and Winnie the Pooh and a Day for Eeyore, Dr. Watson in The Great Mouse Detective, additional voices in The Plastic Man Comedy Adventure Show, The New Yogi Bear Show, and Paddington Bear), dies at age 89.
- February 24: Jan Berenstain, American children's book author and illustrator (co-creator of The Berenstain Bears), dies from a stroke at age 88.
- February 29:
  - Sheldon Moldoff, American comics artist and animator (Courageous Cat and Minute Mouse), dies at age 91.
  - Davy Jones, English actor, singer and member of The Monkees (portrayed himself in the SpongeBob SquarePants episode "SpongeBob SquarePants vs. The Big One", voice of Jim Hawkins in Treasure Island, the Artful Dodger in Oliver Twist, Nigel in the Phineas and Ferb episode "Meatloaf Surprise", himself in The New Scooby-Doo Movies episode "The Haunted Horseman of Hagglethorn Hall" and the Hey Arnold! episode "Fishing Trip"), dies from a heart attack at age 66.

=== March ===
- March 5: Joaquim Muntañola, Spanish animator and comics artist (Gonzalez the Fakir), dies at age 97.
- March 6: Robert B. Sherman, American songwriter and composer (Walt Disney Animation Studios, Snoopy Come Home, Charlotte's Web, Little Nemo: Adventures in Slumberland, The Mighty Kong), dies at age 86.
- March 10: Jean Giraud, French artist, cartoonist and writer (Les Maitres du temps, Tron, Little Nemo: Adventures in Slumberland, Space Jam), dies at age 73.
- March 11: Don Markstein, American comics, cartoons and animation scholar (Don Markstein's Toonopedia) and editor (Comics Revue, co-founder of Apatoons), dies at age 65.
- March 18: Warren Luening, American musician and trumpeter (Walt Disney Animation Studios, The Nightmare Before Christmas, A Goofy Movie, Casper, Pixar, Space Jam, Anastasia, Family Guy, Stuart Little 2, Looney Tunes: Back in Action, The Polar Express, Ice Age: The Meltdown, The Ant Bully, Teen Titans: Trouble in Tokyo, The Simpsons Movie, Horton Hears a Who!, Shrek Forever After, Alvin and the Chipmunks: Chipwrecked, Despicable Me 2), dies at age 70.
- March 20: Noboru Ishiguro, Japanese film director, producer and screenwriter (Space Battleship Yamato II, Super Dimension Fortress Macross, Super Dimension Century Orguss, Humanoid Monster Bem, Megazone 23, Legend of the Galactic Heroes, Tytania), dies at age 73.
- March 23: Jim Duffy, American animator (Hanna-Barbera, Klasky-Csupo, Duckman), dies at age 74.
- March 25: Edd Gould, British animator (Eddsworld), dies from leukemia at age 23.

=== April ===
- April 9: Takeshi Aono, Japanese actor (voice of Shiro Sanada in Space Battleship Yamato, Kami and King Piccolo in the Dragon Ball franchise, Rihaku in Fist of the North Star, Japanese dub voice of Joker in the DC Animated Universe, King Harold in the Shrek franchise, Uncle Max in The Lion King 1½, and Sir Topham Hatt in Thomas & Friends), dies at age 75.
- April 18: Dick Clark, American radio and television personality, television producer and actor (voice of Lefty Redbone in The Angry Beavers episode "The Posei-Dam Adventure", himself in the Fantastic Four episode "The Origin of the Fantastic Four", the Pinky and the Brain episodes "You'll Never Eat Food Pellets in This Town Again!" and "The Pinky and the Brain Reunion Special", the Recess episode "Yes, Mikey, Santa Does Shave", the Futurama episode "Space Pilot 3000", and The Simpsons episode "Treehouse of Horror X"), dies from a heart attack at age 82.
- April 22:
  - Buzz Potamkin, American television producer and director (The Berenstain Bears, Cartoon All-Stars to the Rescue, Hanna-Barbera, Buster & Chauncey's Silent Night), dies from pancreatic cancer at age 66.
  - Paul Gringle, American comics artist, animator and illustrator (advertising film for Champion Spark Plugs), dies at age 89.
- April 24:
  - C. Lindsay Workman, American actor (voice of Garfield's Grandfather in Garfield on the Town, Old Man in Garfield's Halloween Adventure, God in Garfield: His 9 Lives, Professor O'Felix in Garfield's Babes and Bullets, Mr. Blossom in The Wish That Changed Christmas), dies at age 88.
  - Yugo Sako, Japanese film director, producer and animator (Ramayana: The Legend of Prince Rama), dies at age 84.
- April 30: George Murdock, American actor (voice of Boss Biggis in the Batman: The Animated Series episode "The Forgotten"), dies at age 81.

=== May ===
- May 2: Digby Wolfe, English actor (voice of Ziggy in The Jungle Book), dies at age 82.
- May 4: Monty Wedd, Australian comic artist and animator (worked for Artransa, Eric Porter and Ralph Bakshi, Hanna-Barbera), dies at age 91.
- May 6: George Lindsey, American actor (voice of Lafayette in The Aristocats, Trigger in Robin Hood, Deadeye in The Rescuers), dies at age 83.
- May 8:
  - Carlos Loiseau, aka Caloi, Argentine comics artist and animator (Ánima Buenos Aires), dies at age 63.
  - Maurice Sendak, American author and illustrator (Really Rosie, Little Bear, Seven Little Monsters, Where the Wild Things Are, Higglety Pigglety Pop! or There Must Be More to Life), dies at age 83.
- May 17: Geri Rochon, American color stylist (Starchaser: The Legend of Orin, Lazer Tag Academy, The Angry Beavers), dies at an unknown age.
- May 20: Marc Strange, Canadian actor (voice of Forge in X-Men: The Animated Series, Lord Glenn in Silver Surfer), dies from cancer at age 70.
- May 24: Millie Goldsholl, American film director and producer (Up Is Down), dies at age 92.
- May 29: Dick Beals, American actor (voice of the Speedy Alka-Seltzer in Alka-Seltzer ads, N.J. Normanmeyer in The Addams Family, Reggie van Dough in Richie Rich, Birdboy in Birdman and the Galaxy Trio, Buzz Conroy in Frankenstein Jr. and The Impossibles, Baby-Faced Moonbeam in Duck Dodgers, Ralph Phillips in From A to Z-Z-Z-Z and Boyhood Daze, Davey in Davey and Goliath), dies at age 85.

=== June ===
- June 10: Judy Freudberg, American screenwriter (Sesame Street, An American Tail, The Land Before Time, Between the Lions), dies from a brain tumor at age 62.
- June 15: Csaba Varga, Hungarian animator and producer (founder of Varga Studio), dies at age 66.
- June 16: Susan Tyrrell, American actress (narrator in Wizards), dies at age 67.
- June 19: Victor Spinetti, Welsh actor, author, poet and raconteur (voice of Dick Deadeye in Dick Deadeye, or Duty Done, Texas Pete in SuperTed, Glump in The Princess and the Goblin), dies from prostate cancer at age 82.
- June 24:
  - Lonesome George, Spanish Pinta Island tortoise (inspiration for the Lonesome Hubert segment in the Futurama episode "Naturama"), dies at age 101–102.
  - Iwan Lemaire, Belgian comics artist, animator, photographer and painter, dies at age 78.
- June 27: Don Grady, American actor, composer and musician (Jetsons: The Movie, Globehunters: An Around the World in 80 Days Adventure), dies from myeloma at age 68.

=== July ===
- July 3: Andy Griffith, American actor, comedian, television producer, singer and writer (voice of the Narrator in Frosty's Winter Wonderland, Santa Claus in Christmas Is Here Again), dies from a heart attack at age 86.
- July 4: Gerald Polley, American singer, activist and animator, dies at age 65.
- July 8: Ernest Borgnine, American actor (voice of Carface in All Dogs Go to Heaven 2 and All Dogs Go to Heaven: The Series, Mermaid Man in SpongeBob SquarePants, himself in The Simpsons episode "Boy-Scoutz 'n the Hood"), dies at age 95.
- July 12: Kenneth Landau, American comic artist and animator (Walt Disney Animation Studios, DePatie-Freleng, Hanna-Barbera, Cambria Productions), dies at age 86.
- July 13: Ginny Tyler, American actress (voice of Jan in Space Ghost, Sue Storm / Invisible Woman in The New Fantastic Four, the female squirrel in The Sword in the Stone, Davey's mother and sister in Davey and Goliath), dies at age 86.
- July 16: Frank Andrina, American animator and timing director (Warner Bros. Animation, The Smurfs, Wacky Races, The Flintstones), dies at age 82.
- July 26:
  - Tibor Hernádi, Hungarian animator, film director, producer, screenwriter and storyboard artist (Felix the Cat: The Movie, The Seventh Brother, Red Bull commercials), dies at age 64.
  - Lupe Ontiveros, American actress (voice of Abuela Elena in Maya & Miguel, Lupe in the Family Guy episode "We Love You Conrad", Anne in the King of the Hill episode "The Substitute Spanish Prisoner"), dies from liver cancer at age 67.
- July 27:
  - Norman Alden, American actor (voice of Kay in The Sword in the Stone and Kranix in The Transformers: The Movie), dies at age 87.
  - Geoffrey Hughes, British actor (voice of Paul McCartney in Yellow Submarine), dies at age 68.
- July 29: Chris Marker, French film director and animator (Les Astronautes), dies at age 91.
- July 31: Gore Vidal, American writer and public intellectual (voiced himself in the Family Guy episode "Mother Tucker", and The Simpsons episode "Moe'N'a Lisa"), dies from pneumonia at age 86.

=== August ===
- August 2: Mark Klastorin, American voice actor (voice of Bob, Skipper, Man in White and Yuppie Dad in Aaahh!!! Real Monsters, Truckee and other various characters in The Angry Beavers, Fisherman, Ned, Cop #2 and Old Man in Johnny Bravo, Vinnie in Happy Feet, Paul Teutul Sr. in the Celebrity Deathmatch episode "Stand-up vs. Smack Down") and television writer (Back to the Future), dies from cancer at age 61.
- August 6: Marvin Hamlisch, American composer and conductor (voiced himself in The Simpsons episode "Gone Abie Gone"), dies from respiratory arrest at age 68.
- August 14: Ron Palillo, American actor (voice of Rubik in Rubik, the Amazing Cube, Sgt. Squeally in Laverne & Shirley in the Army, Scrounger in Pound Puppies, Ordinary Guy in the Darkwing Duck episode "Planet of the Capes", himself in the Duckman episode "Westward, No!"), dies from a heart attack at age 63.
- August 16: William Windom, American actor (voice of Puppetino in Pinocchio and the Emperor of the Night, Dr. Marcus Wealthy in Pink Panther and Sons, "Cutter" King in Sky Commanders, Uncle Chuck in Sonic the Hedgehog, Uncle Bob in the Goof Troop episode "Major Goof", Ethan Clark in the Batman: The Animated Series episode "Prophecy of Doom"), dies at age 88.
- August 20: Phyllis Diller, American actress and comedian (voice of the Queen in A Bug's Life, Thelma Griffin in Family Guy, the Monster's Mate in Mad Monster Party?, the White Queen in Alice Through the Looking Glass, Grandma Neutron in The Adventures of Jimmy Neutron, Boy Genius, the Sugar Plum Fairy in The Nuttiest Nutcracker, Jane Goodair in the Captain Planet and the Planeteers episode "Smog Hog", Suzy Squirrel in the Animaniacs episode "The Sunshine Squirrels", Lillian in The King of the Hill episode "Escape from Party Island", Mitzi in the Hey Arnold! episode "Grandpa's Sister", Mask Scara in The Powerpuff Girls episode "A Made Up Story", herself in The New Scooby-Doo Movies episode "A Good Medium is Rare"), dies at age 95.
- August 21: Tissa David, Romanian-American film director (Bonjour Paris, worked for UPA, Hubley Studios, R.O. Blechman), dies from a brain tumor at age 91.
- August 22: Jeffrey Stone, American model (model for Prince Charming in Cinderella), dies at age 85.
- August 24: Steve Franken, American actor (voice of Eugene Atwater in Road Rovers, Mr. Beal in Detention, Mr. Janus in the Static Shock episode "Grounded", Rundle in the Batman: The Animated Series episode "The Mechanic", President Generic in The Sylvester & Tweety Mysteries episode "Spooker of the House"), dies at age 80.

=== September ===
- September 3:
  - Michael Clarke Duncan, American actor (voice of Tug in Brother Bear and Brother Bear 2, Big Daddy in The Land Before Time XI: Invasion of the Tinysauruses, Future Wade in Kim Possible: A Sitch in Time, Massive in Loonatics Unleashed, Elder Marley in Delgo, Commander Vachir in Kung Fu Panda, Guardian Cat in the Fish Hooks episode "Labor of Love", Groot in the Ultimate Spider-Man episode "Guardians of the Galaxy", Kingpin in the Spider-Man: The New Animated Series episode "Royal Scam", Coach Webb in the King of the Hill episode "The Son Also Roses", Mongo in The Proud Family episode "Smackmania 6: Mongo vs. Mama's Boy", Rashid "The Rocket" Randell in the Static Shock episode "Linked", Rockwell in The Fairly OddParents episode "Crash Nebula", Krall in the Teen Titans episode "Cyborg the Barbarian"), dies at age 54.
  - Ottó Foky, Hungarian animator and film director, dies at age 85.
- September 10: Lance LeGault, American actor (voice of Junior the Buffalo in Home on the Range, Yank Justice in Bigfoot and the Muscle Machines, the Chief in Tugger: The Jeep 4x4 Who Wanted to Fly), dies at age 77.
- September 16:
  - John Coates, English film producer (Yellow Submarine, The Snowman), dies at age 84.
  - John Ingle, American actor (voice of Cera's father in The Land Before Time franchise, Wise Paw in Paw Paws, Judge in the Animaniacs episode "La La Law"), dies at age 84.
- September 17: Roman Kroitor, Canadian filmmaker (Universe, creator of SANDDE), dies at age 85.
- September 20: Michael Rye, American actor (voice of the title character in The Lone Ranger, Apache Chief and Green Lantern in Super Friends, Duke Igthorn, King Gregor, and Sir Gawain in Adventures of the Gummi Bears, J.J. Wagstaff in Fluppy Dogs, Mr. Slaghoople in The Flintstone Kids, Farley Stillwell in Spider-Man), dies at age 94.

=== October ===
- October 8: Ken Sansom, American actor (voice of Rabbit in the Winnie the Pooh franchise, Hound in The Transformers, Erick Hunter in The Littles, Martin Stein in The Super Powers Team: Galactic Guardians, Ralph Throgmorton in the TaleSpin episode "On a Wing and a Bear"), dies at age 85.
- October 12: Břetislav Pojar, Czech puppeteer, animator and film director (To See or Not to See, Balablok), dies at age 89.
- October 18: John Clive, English actor (voice of John Lennon in Yellow Submarine), dies at age 79.
- October 21: Run Wrake, English animator and film director (Rabbit), dies at age 46.
- October 22: Russell Means, American activist and actor (voice of Chief Powhatan in Pocahontas and Pocahontas II: Journey to a New World, Shaman and Chief Sentry in Turok: Son of Stone, Thomas in the Duckman episode "Role With It"), dies at age 72.
- October 27: Bill White, American animator and comics artist (Spümcø, Walt Disney Company, DiC Entertainment), dies at age 51.

=== November ===
- November 5: Margaret Nichols, American animator (Warner Bros. Animation, Walt Disney Animation Studios, UPA, Fleischer Studios, Snowball Animation, Patin, TV Spots, Creston, Eagle, Hanna-Barbera, Marvel Productions, Universal Studios and Graz Entertainment) and animation director (The Transformers, Inhumanoids, My Little Pony: The Movie, The Transformers: The Movie), dies at age 82.
- November 6: Vladimír Jiránek, Czech animator, illustrator and film director (co-creator of Pat & Mat), dies at age 74.
- November 8: Lucille Bliss, American actress (voice of the title character in Crusader Rabbit, Anastasia Tremaine in Cinderella, Nibbles in Tom & Jerry, Smurfette in The Smurfs, Mrs. Beth Fitzgibbons in The Secret of NIMH, Ms. Bitters in Invader Zim), dies at age 96.
- November 22: Mel Shaw, American animator (Walt Disney Company), dies at age 97.
- November 23: Larry Hagman, American actor, director and producer (voice of Wallace Brady in The Simpsons episode "The Monkey Suit"), dies from throat cancer at age 81.
- November 28: Don Rhymer, American screenwriter and film producer (Fish Police, Surf's Up, Blue Sky Studios), dies at age 51.

=== December ===
- December 3: Fyodor Khitruk, Russian animator and film director (The Story of a Crime, Film, Film, Film, Winnie-the-Pooh, O, Sport, You - the Peace!), dies at age 95.
- December 4: Gerrit van Dijk, Dutch animator, filmmaker, actor and painter, dies at age 73.
- December 7: Rusty Mills, American animator (Warner Bros. Animation), dies from colon cancer at age 49.
- December 15: Maxine Markota, American animation checker (What's New, Mr. Magoo?, DePatie-Freleng Enterprises, Filmation, Daffy Duck's Quackbusters, The Simpsons), dies at age 83.
- December 21: Daphne Oxenford, English actress (voice of several of the female kid characters in The Wind in the Willows, Mother in The Reluctant Dragon), dies at age 93.
- December 24:
  - Charles Durning, American actor (voice of Francis Griffin in Family Guy, Archie the Archelon in The Land Before Time IV: Journey Through the Mists, Grandfather in The Butter Battle Book), dies at age 89.
  - Lee Hartman, American novelist and animator (Walt Disney Animation Studios, Warner Bros. Cartoons), dies at age 82.
- December 26:
  - Gerry Anderson, English television and film producer, director, writer and occasional voice artist (Dick Spanner, P.I., Lavender Castle, New Captain Scarlet, Firestorm), dies at age 83.
  - Gerald McDermott, American film director, children's book writer and illustrator, dies at age 71.

=== Specific date unknown ===
- Esfandiar Ahmadieh, Iranian film director, dies at age 82 or 83.

== See also ==
- 2012 in anime
