= 2012 in anime =

Events in 2012 in anime.

== Year in review ==
In Japanese polling, Newtype's best releases of Autumn 2011 to Summer 2012 announced the best anime series as Fate/Zero, The Idolmaster, Nisemonogatari, Tari Tari and Hyouka. For movies, the poll named only three awards for the K-On! Movie, Mahou Shoujo Lyrical Nanoha: The Movie and Wolf Children. Another series debut was Sword Art Online. Kotaku's Richard Eisenbeis praised Sword Art Online, even before the series' conclusion, for its complex and genre-crossing storyline and intelligent portrayal of sociological and psychological issues. Eisenbeis would also pick five different movies for top film of 2012, including The Wolf Children Ame and Yuki, Evangelion 3.0, Detective Conan: The Eleventh Striker, One Piece Film: Z and Doraemon: Nobita and the Island of Miracles as his top five movies.

Anime News Network's, Theron Martin and Carl Kimlinger listed the best anime in America of 2012 summarized the popular works that were widely released to American audiences. The two reviewers picked Puella Magi Madoka Magica and Anohana as series of the year with runners-up Love, Chunibyo & Other Delusions and Kimi ni Todoke. The staff's picks for best movies of the year, were The Secret World of Arrietty and Redline.

In March 2013, the Tokyo Anime Awards recognized Wolf Children for animation of the year, Sword Art Online and Kuroko's Basketball for television series of the year.

At the Mainichi Film Awards, the Animation Film Award was won by Wolf Children and the Ōfuji Noburō Award was won by Combustible. Wolf Children also won the Japan Academy Prize for Animation of the Year. Internationally, A Letter to Momo won the Asia Pacific Screen Award for Best Animated Feature Film, with three of the other four nominees being also from Japan: From Up on Poppy Hill, Niji-Iro Hotaru: Eien no Natsu Yasumi and Wolf Children.

== Deaths ==
March 20 - Noboru Ishiguro

== Releases ==
=== Films ===
A list of anime that debuted in theaters between January 1 and December 31, 2012.

Release date	Title	Studio	Director	Running time (minutes)	Alternate title	Ref
January 7	Magic Tree House	Ajia-do	Hiroshi Nishikiori	105	Majikku tsurīhausu	
January 7	Sacred Seven: Wings of the Silver Moon	Sunrise	Yoshimitsu Oohashi	59	Seikuriddo sebun: Gingetsu no tsubasa	
January 21	.hack//The Movie: Sekai no Mukou ni	Anima; CyberConnect2	Hiroshi Matsuyama	110	.Hakku//The movu~ie: sekai no mukō ni	
February 4	Berserk: The Golden Age Arc I - The Egg of the King	Studio 4°C	Toshiyuki Kubooka	76	Beruseruku kogane jidai-hen I haō no tamago	
February 11	Dragon Age: Dawn of the Seeker	Oxybot	Fumihiko Sori	89	Doragon'eiji - buraddo meiji no seisen -	
March 3	Doraemon: Nobita to Kiseki no Shima - Animal Adventure	Shin-Ei Animation	Kōzō Kusuba	100	Eiga Doraemon Nobita to kiseki no shima ~ animaru adobenchā ~	
March 10	s.CRY.ed Alteration II: Quan			93	Sukuraido orutareishon kōhen QUAN	
March 17	Precure All Stars Movie New Stage: Mirai no Tomodachi			73	Eiga purikyua ōru sutāzu nyū Stage mirai no tomodachi	
March 17	Strike Witches: The Movie			97	Sutoraikuu~itchīzu gekijō-ban	
April 14	Crayon Shin-chan: Arashi wo Yobu! Ora to Uchuu no Princess			110	Eiga Kureyon shin-chan arashi o yobu! Ora to uchū no purinsesu	
April 14	Detective Conan: The Eleventh Striker			110	Gekijō-ban meitantei konan 11 hitome no sutoraikā	
April 21	A Letter to Momo			120	Momo e no tegami	
May 19	Rainbow Fireflies			104	Nijiiro hotaru ~ eien no natsuyasumi ~	
June 2	Blood-C: The Last Dark			106	Gekijō-ban buraddoshī za rasuto dāku	
June 4	Combustible			12	Faiātaun	
June 4	Possessions			14	Tsukumo	
June 9	Persona 4 the Animation: The Factor of Hope			90	Perusona 4 the Animation - the fakutā of Hope -	
June 16	Library Wars: The Wings of Revolution			105	Toshokan sensō kakumei no Tsubasa	
June 23	Berserk: The Golden Age Arc II - The Battle for Doldrey			92	Beruseruku kogane jidai-hen II dorudorei kōryaku	
July 7	Anpanman: Revive Banana Island!			46	Sore ike! Anpan man yomigaere banana shima	
July 7	Sore Ike! Anpanman: Rhythm de Teasobi - Anpanman to Fushigi na Parasol			20	Sore ike! Anpan man rizumudete asobi anpan man to fushigina parasoru	
July 7	The Life of Budori Gusuko			105	Gusukō budori no denki	
July 14	Magical Girl Lyrical Nanoha: The Movie 2nd A's			149	Mahō shōjo ririka runanoha The mūbī 2 nd A' s	
July 14	Pokémon: Kyurem VS. The Sword of Justice			71	Gekijō-ban pokettomonsutā besutōisshu kyuremu VS seikenshi	
July 14	Pokémon: Meloetta's Moonlight Serenade			20	Meroetta no kirakirarisaitaru	
July 16	Code Geass: Akito the Exiled - The Wyvern Arrives			51	Kōdo giasu bōkoku no Akito dai 1-shō 'yokuryū wa maiorita'	
July 21	Starship Troopers: Invasion			89	Sutāshippu tourūpāzu inbeijon	
July 21	Uchuu Kyoudai: Itten no Hikari			38	Puranetariumu kosumo kyōdai ~ itten no Hikari ~	
July 21	Wolf Children			117	Ookami kodomo no ame to yuki	
July 28	Naruto Shippuden: Road to Ninja			109	ROAD TO NINJA NARUTO THE MOVIE	
August 11	Jewelpet Movie: Sweets Dance Princess			75	Eiga juerupetto suuītsu dansu purinsesu	
August 11	Onegai My Melody: Yuu & Ai			12	Onegai mai merodi tomo & ai	
August 18	Fairy Tail the Movie: The Phoenix Priestess			86	Gekijō-ban fearī teiru hōō no miko	
August 25	After School Midnighters			100	Hōkago middonaitāzu	
August 26	Gintama: Yorinuki Gintama-san on Theater 2D			96	Gintama yorinuki Gintama-san onshiatā 2D	
September 15	Biohazard: Damnation			100	Baiohazādo damunēshon	
September 22	Tiger & Bunny Movie 1			92	Gekijō-ban TIGER& BUNNY - The Beginning -	
September 29	Asura			75	Ashura	
September 29	Mardock Scramble: The Third Exhaust			68	Marudoukku sukuranburu dai 3-bu haiki	
October 6	Puella Magi Madoka Magica the Movie Part 1: Beginnings			131	Shinpi no hō	
October 6	The Mystical Laws			119	Gekijō-ban mahō shōjo Madoka ☆ magika hajimari no monogatari	
October 13	Puella Magi Madoka Magica the Movie Part 2: Eternal			109	Gekijō-ban mahō shōjo Madoka ☆ magika eien no monogatari	
October 19	Psychic School Wars			106	Nerawareta gakuen	
October 20	Fusé: Memoirs of a Huntress			110	Fuku teppō musume no torimono-chō	
October 20	Macross FB7: Ore no Uta wo Kike!			90	Makurosu FB 7 ginga-ryū tamashī ore no uta wo kike!	
October 27	009 Re:Cyborg			103	009 RE:CYBORG	
October 27	Smile Precure! Movie: Ehon no Naka wa Minna Chiguhagu!			71	Eiga sumairupurikyua! Ehon no naka wa min'na chiguhagu!	
November 1	Gothicmade: Hana no Utame			70	GOTHICMADE - gotikkumēdo hana no uta on'na -	
November 17	Evangelion: 3.0 You Can (Not) Redo			95	Evangerion Shin Gekijōban: Kyū	
November 29	Mass Effect: Paragon Lost			94	Masu efekuto ~ ushinawareta paragon	
December 1	Anpanman ga Umareta Hi			11	Anpan man ga umaretahi	
December 1	Inazuma Eleven Go vs. Danball Senki W Movie			90	Gekijō-ban inazuma irebun GO vs danbōru senki W	
December 15	One Piece Film: Z			107	Wan pīsu firumu Z	
December 22	Kaiketsu Zorori Da-Da-Da-Daibouken!			82	Kai ketsu zorori dadada daibōken!	
December 28	Blue Exorcist: The Movie			88	Gekijō-ban ao no futsumashi (ekusoshisuto)	

=== Television series ===
A list of anime television series that debuted between January 1 and December 31, 2012.

First run start and end dates	Title	Episodes	Studio	Director	Alternate title	Ref
January 3 – March 27	Natsume's Book of Friends Season 4	13			Natsume yūjinchō shi	
January 5 – March 22	Detective Opera Milky Holmes 2	12			Tantei opera mirukyi hōmuzu dai 2-maku	
January 5 – March 29	The Prince of Tennis II	13			Shin tenisu no ōjisama	
January 6 – March 23	High School DxD	12			Haisu kūru D×D	
January 6 – March 28	Recorder and Randsell	13			Rikōdā to randoseru do ♪	
January 6 – March 30	Amagami SS+ plus	13			Amagami SS+ plus	
January 6 – March 30	Kill Me Baby	13			Kiru mī beibē	
January 6 – March 30	Symphogear	13			Senhime zesshō shinfogia	
January 7 – March 24	The Familiar of Zero F	12			Zero no tsukaima F	
January 7 – September 29	The Knight in the Area	37			Eria no kishi	
January 8 – March 18	Nisemonogatari	11			Nise monogatari	
January 8 – March 25	Brave 10	12			Bureibu ten	
January 8 – March 25	Lagrange: The Flower of Rin-ne	12			Rin'ne no raguranje	
January 8 – July 1	Bodacious Space Pirates	26			Mōretsu uchū kaizoku	
January 8 – December 30	Poyopoyo Kansatsu Nikki	52			Poyopoyo kansatsu nikki	
January 9 – June 25	Aquarion Evol	26			Akuerion EVOL	
January 10 – March 27	Another	12			Anazā	
January 10 – March 27	Daily Lives of High School Boys	12			Danshi kōkōsei no nichijō	
January 10 – March 27	Waiting in the Summer	12			Ano natsu de matteru	
January 11 – March 28	Listen to Me, Girls. I Am Your Father!	12			Papa no iu koto o kiki nasai!	
January 13 – March 30	Inu X Boku Secret Service	12			Yōko × sāvuanto SS	
January 18 – March 20, 2013	LBX: Little Battlers eXperience Season 2	58			Danbōru senki W	
January 24 – March 27	Gokujo.: Gokurakuin Joshikou Ryou Monogatari	12			Gokujo~tsu.~ Gokuraku-in joshikō ryō monogatari ~	
February 3 – March 23	Black Rock Shooter	8			Burakku ★ rokku shūtā	
February 5 – January 27, 2013	Smile PreCure!	48			Sumairu purikyua	
March 17 – April 21	Ozma	6			Ozuma	
March 26 – February 26, 2013	Victory Kickoff!!	39			Ginga e kikku ofu!!	
April 1 – June 24	Hiiro no Kakera: The Tamayori Princess Saga	13			Hiiro no kakera	
April 1 – September 23	Shiba Inuko-san	26			Shiba inuko-san	
April 1 – March 22, 2014	Space Brothers	99			Kosumo kyōdai	
April 1 – March 30, 2014	Saint Seiya Omega	97			Seitōshi seiya Ō	
April 1 – March 26, 2017	Folktales from Japan	258			Furusato saisei Nihon no mukashibanashi	
April 2 – September 19	Nukko.	24			Nukko.	
April 2 – March 2, 2013	Paboo & Mojies	52			Pabū & mojīzu	
April 2 – March 25, 2013	Gon	50			Gon	
April 2 – November 29, 2013	Panda no Taputapu	431			Panda nota putapu	
April 3 – June 19	Queen's Blade Rebellion	12			Kuīnzu bureido riberion	
April 3 – June 26	You and Me 2	13			Kimi to boku. 2	
April 3 – June 26	Yurumates 3D	13			Yurumeitsu 3 dei	
April 3 – June 26	Zetman	13			Zettoman	
April 3 – September 18	Gakkatsu!	25			Gakkatsu!	
April 3 – February 26, 2013	Zumomo to Nupepe	32			Zumomo to nupepe	
April 3 – March 26, 2013	Naruto Spin-Off: Rock Lee & His Ninja Pals	51			Naruto SD rokku rī no seishun furupawā ninden	
April 4 – June 27	Recorder and Randsell Re	13			Rikōdā to randoseru re ♪	
April 4 – September 26	Arashi no Yoru ni: Himitsu no Tomodachi	26			Arashi no yoruni himitsu no tomodachi	
April 4 – February 19, 2014	Here Comes the Black Witch!!	60			Kuromajo-san ga tōru!!	
April 5 – June 7	Is This a Zombie? of the Dead	10			Kore ha zonbi desu ka? OF THE deddo	
April 5 – June 21	Medaka Box	12			Medaka bokkusu	
April 5 – June 28	Lupin the Third: The Woman Called Fujiko Mine	13			LUPIN the Third ~ mine fujiko to iu on'na ~	
April 5 – March 28, 2013	Polar Bear Cafe	50			Shirokuma kafe	
April 6 – June 28	Himitsukessha Taka no Tsume NEO	38			Himitsukessha taka no tsume neo	
April 6 – June 29	A Summer-Colored Miracle	12			Natsuiro kiseki	
April 6 – June 29	Place to Place	12			Atchi kotchi	
April 6 – June 29	Sankarea: Undying Love	12			Sankarea	
April 6 – September 28	Sengoku Collection	26			Sengoku korekushon	
April 7 – June 30	Magical Journey: Little Charo in Tohoku	12			Ritoru Charo ~ Tōhoku-hen ~	
April 7 – September 22	Accel World	24			Akuseru wārudo	
April 7 – March 30, 2013	Baku Tech! Bakugan	51			Tekku o bakuhatsu sa sero! Bakugan	
April 7 – March 30, 2013	Duel Masters Victory V	51			Deyueru masutāzu bikutorī V	
April 7 – March 30, 2013	Jewelpet Kira Deco!	52			Juerupetto kira ☆ dekotsu!	
April 7 – March 30, 2013	Penguin no Mondai POW	51			Pengin'no mondai POW	
April 7 – March 30, 2013	Pretty Rhythm: Dear My Future	51			Puritī rizumu dia mai fuyūchā	
April 8 – June 24	Fate/Zero Season 2	12			Feito/zero 2nd shīzun	
April 8 – July 1	Mysterious Girlfriend X	13			Nazo no kanojo X	
April 8 – September 22	Kuroko's Basketball	25			Kuroko no basuke	
April 8 – September 23	Phi-Brain ~ Puzzle of God: The Orpheus Order	25			Fai burein ~-shin no pazuru orupeusu ōdā-hen	
April 8 – December 23	Beyblade: Shogun Steel	45			Metaru faito beiburēdo ZERO G	
April 8 – January 2, 2013	Cardfight!! Vanguard Asia Circuit	39			Kādofaito!! Vuangādo ajia sākitto-hen	
April 9 – June 25	Dusk Maiden of Amnesia	13			Tasogare otome × amunejia	
April 9 – July 2	Saki Episode of Side A	12			Saki - Saki - Achiga-hen episode of saido - A	
April 10 – June 26	Nyaruko: Crawling with Love	12			Hai yore! Nyaruko-san	
April 11 – June 27	Jormungand	12			Yorumungando	
April 13 – June 29	Kids on the Slope	12			Sakamichi no aporon	
April 13 – June 29	Tsuritama	12			Tsuri-kyū	
April 13 – June 30	Shining Hearts: Shiawase no Pan	12			Shainingu hātsu 〜 shiawase no pan 〜	
April 13 – November 20	Eureka Seven: AO	24			Eureka sebun AO	
April 18 – May 1, 2013	Inazuma Eleven Go: Chrono Stone	51			Inazuma irebun GO Kurono sutōn	
April 23 – September 17	Hyouka	22			Hyōka	
April 29 – July 22	AKB0048	13			AKB0048	
May 13 – February 16, 2015	Ninja Hattori-kun (2012)	52			Ninja hattori-kun (2012-nenban)	
June 4 – February 25, 2013	Kingdom	38			Kingudamu	
June 21 – January 10, 2013	Pokémon: Black & White: Rival Destinies	24			Poketto monsutā besutō isshu shīzun 2	
July 1 – September 16	La storia della Arcana Famiglia	12			Arukana Famiria - La sutōria della Arcana Famiglia -	
July 1 – September 23	Tari Tari	13			TARI TARI	
July 2 – September 17	Humanity Has Declined	12			Jinrui ha suitai shimashita	
July 2 – September 18	YuruYuri: Happy Go Lily ♪♪	12			Yuru Yuri ♪♪	
July 2 – December 24	Chitose Get You!!	26			Chitose getchu!!	
July 2 – December 24	Muv-Luv Alternative: Total Eclipse	24			Maburavu orutaneitivu tōtaru ikuripusu	
July 3 – September 25	Chōyaku Hyakunin isshu: Uta Koi	13			Chōyaku hyakunin'isshu uta koi.	
July 3 – September 25	Yurumates 3D Plus	13			Yurume itsu 3 dei PLUS	
July 5 – September 27	Good Luck Girl!	13			Binbōgami ga	
July 6 – September 14	Moyasimon Returns	11			Moyashimon ritānzu	
July 6 – September 14	Natsuyuki Rendezvous	11			Natsu yuki randebū	
July 6 – September 21	Aesthetica of a Rogue Hero	12			Hagure yūsha no kichiku bigaku〈esutetika〉	
July 6 – September 25	So, I Can't Play H!	12			Dakara boku wa, H ga dekinai.	
July 6 – September 28	Campione!	13			Kanpiōne! ~ Matsuro wanu kamigami to kami-goroshi no maō ~	
July 6 – September 28	Joshiraku	13			Joshi raku	
July 6 – September 28	Love, Election and Chocolate	12			Koi to senkyo to chokorēto	
July 6 – September 28	Nakaimo - My Sister Is Among Them!	12			Kono naka ni 1-ri, imōto ga iru!	
July 7 – September 29	Dog Days	13			Doggu deizu'	
July 7 – March 30, 2013	Tanken Driland	37			Tanken dorirando	
July 8 – September 23	Lagrange: The Flower of Rin-ne Season 2	12			Rin'ne no raguranje season 2	
July 8 – September 30	Kokoro Connect	13			Kokoro konekuto	
July 8 – September 30	Horizon in the Middle of Nowhere (season 2)	13			Kyōkaisenjō no horaizon II	
July 8 – December 23	Sword Art Online	25			Sōdo āto onrain	
July 9 – September 24	The Ambition of Oda Nobuna	12			Oda nobuna no yabō	
July 10 – September 25	Hakuoki: Demon of the Fleeting Blossom - Dawn of the Shinsengumi	12			Hakuōki reimei-roku	
July 31 – November 16	Maji de Otaku na English! Ribbon-chan: Eigo de Tatakau Mahou Shoujo	12			Maji de otaku na ingurisshu! Ribon-chan ~ eigo de tatakau mahō shōjo ~	
September 9 – March 31, 2013	Battle Spirits: Sword Eyes	29			Batoru supirittsu: sōdo aizu	
September 10 – August 29, 2013	Tamagotchi! Yume Kira Dream	49			Tamagotchi! Yume kiradorīmu	
September 29 – March 23, 2013	From the New World	25			Shinsekai yori	
September 30 – December 23	Hiiro no Kakera: The Tamayori Princess Saga Season 2	13			Hiiro no kakera dai nishō	
October 2 – November 20	Lychee Light Club	8			Raichi DE-kō kurabu	
October 2 – December 25	Kamisama Kiss	13			Kamisama hajimemashita	
October 2 – December 25	My Little Monster	13			Tonari no kaibutsu-kun	
October 2 – September 24, 2013	Chōsoku Henkei Gyrozetter	51			Chōsoku henkei jairozettā	
October 3 – December 19	Wooser's Hand-to-Mouth Life	12			U-sa no sono higurashi	
October 3 – September 25, 2013	Monsuno: World Master	52			Kemono xuán Batoru monsūno	
October 4 – December 20	Btooom!	12			BTOOOM!	
October 4 – December 20	Hayate the Combat Butler: Can't Take My Eyes Off You	12			Hayate no gotoku! Can't Take My Eyes Off You	
October 4 – December 20	Love, Chunibyo & Other Delusions	12			Chūnibyō demo koigashitai!	
October 4 – March 28, 2013	Gintama: Enchousen	13			Gintama' enchō-sen	
October 5 – December 21	Busou Shinki: Armored War Goddess	12			Busōshinki	
October 5 – December 21	Hidamari Sketch × Honeycomb	12			Hidamari suketchi × hanikamu	
October 5 – December 21	OniAi	12			Onī-chan dakedo ai sae areba kankeinai yo netsu	
October 5 – December 28	K	13			K	
October 5 – March 29, 2013	Blast of Tempest	24			Zetsuen no tenpesuto	
October 5 – September 27, 2013	Picchipichi Shizuku-chan	52			Pitchipichi ♪ shizuku-chan	
October 6 – December 29	Haitai Nanafa	13			Haitai nanaha	
October 6 – December 29	To Love-Ru Darkness	12			To LOVEru - tora buru - dākunesu	
October 6 – March 30, 2013	Bakuman. 3	25			Bakuman.	
October 6 – April 6, 2013	JoJo's Bizarre Adventure	26			Jojo no kimyō na bōken	
October 6 – April 6, 2013	Little Busters!	26			Ritoru basutāzu!	
October 7 – December 23	Code:Breaker	13			CØDE:BREAKER	
October 7 – December 23	Teekyu	12			Te-kyū	
October 7 – December 30	Say "I love you"	13			Suki tte ī na yo.	
October 7 – February 24, 2013	Bottom Biting Bug	20			Oshiri kajiri mushi	
October 7 – March 31, 2013	Magi: The Labyrinth of Magic	25			Magi The labyrinth of majikku	
October 7 – September 29, 2013	B-Daman Fireblast	52			Kurosufaito bīdaman eS	
October 7 – March 23, 2014	Yu-Gi-Oh! Zexal II	73			Yū ☆ gi ☆ Ō ZEXAL II (sekando)	
October 8 – April 1, 2013	Ixion Saga DT	25			Ikushion sāga DT	
October 8 – March 31, 2016	Aikatsu!	178			Aikatsu! Aidoru katsudou!	
October 9 – March 25, 2013	Girls und Panzer	12			Gāruzu & pantsuā	
October 9 – March 26, 2013	The Pet Girl of Sakurasou	24			Sakurasō no petto na kanojo	
October 10 – December 26	Jormungand: Perfect Order	12			Yorumungando pāfekuto ōdā	
October 11 – December 27	Medaka Box Abnormal	12			Medaka bokkusu abunōmaru	
October 12 – March 22, 2013	Psycho-Pass	22			Saikopasu	
October 12 – March 22, 2013	Robotics;Notes	22			Robotikusu nōtsu	
November 4 – May 10, 2013	Initial D Fifth Stage	14			Inisharu Dī Fifth Stage	
December 21 – March 15, 2013	Boku no Imōto wa "Ōsaka Okan"	12			Boku no imōto wa 'Ōsaka o kan'	

=== OVAs, ONAs, and Television Specials ===
A list of original video animations, original network animations, and television specials that debuted between January 1 and December 31, 2012.

First run start and end dates	Title	Category	Episodes	Studio	Director	Alternate title	Ref
January 1 – February 23	Tales of Gekijou	TV Special	5			Teiruzu obu gekijō	
January 3	Guilty Crown Locus: Reassortment	TV Special	1			Giruti kuraun kiseki: Reassortment	
January 3	Neko no Sakusen	TV Special	1			TheNightGame neko no sakusen	
January 13 – January 27	Thermae Romae	TV Special	3			Terumae romae	
January 18 – April 18	Ai no Kusabi	OVA	4			Manokusabi	
January 25	Mashiro-iro Symphony: Airi ga Anata no Kanojo ni!?	TV Special	1			Mashiro iro shinfonī - Airi ga anata no kanojo ni!?	
January 25 – November 21	Guilty Crown: 4-koma Gekijou	TV Special	11			Giru kura 4-koma gekijō giru-tei kura kumo	
January 26	Otome Nadeshiko Koi Techou	OVA	1			Otome nadeshiko koi techō	
January 27	Morita-san wa Mukuchi. Specials	TV Special	2			Morita-san ha mukuchi.	
January 27 – May 30	Shakugan no Shana-tan III (Final): Final Destruction	TV Special	2			Shakugan'no shana-tan fu~ainaru desutorakushon	
January 27 – August 31	The Future Diary Specials	TV Special	10			Mirai Nikki: Ura Mirai Nikki	
January 31	Sayonara Zetsubou Sensei Special Omake	TV Special	1			Sayonara zetsubō-sensei	
January 31	Sayonara Zetsubou Sensei Special	TV Special	1			Sayonara zetsubō-sensei	
February 3	Ijime: Ikenie no Kyoushitsu	OVA	1			Ijime 〜 ikenie no kyōshitsu 〜	
February 8	Ground Control to Psychoelectric Girl Special	TV Special	1			Denpa onna to seishun otoko mayonaka no taiyō	
February 15	Minori Scramble!	OVA	1			Minori sukuranburu!	
February 15	Yuri Seijin Naoko-san	OVA	1			Yuri seijin' naoko-san	
February 22	Ano Hi Mita Hana no Namae wo Bokutachi wa Mada Shiranai.: Menma e no Tegami	TV Special	1			Ano hi mita hana no namae o bokutachi wa mada shiranai. 'Men ma e no tegami'	
February 22	Steins;Gate: Egoistic Poriomania	TV Special	1			Shutainzu gēto ōkōbakko no poriomania	
February 22 – May 23	Mashiroiro Symphony Picture Drama	TV Special	2			Mashiro iro shinfonī - The karā of lovers - pikuchā dorama	
February 22 – July 25	To Heart 2: Dungeon Travelers	OVA	2			To~uhāto 2 danjon toraberāzu	
February 24	Kaette Kita Top wo Nerae! Kagaku Kouza	TV Special	2			Kaette kita toppu wo nerae! Kagaku kōza	
February 24	Tenkuu no Escaflowne Recaps	TV Special	4			Tenkū no esukafurōne BD - bokkusu tokubetsu henshū-ban	
February 26 – August 25	Patema Inverted: Beginning of the Day	TV Special	4			Sakasama no patema Beginning of the dē	
March 1 – September 25, 2013	Maken-Ki! OVA	OVA	2			Makenki~tsu ovu~a	
March 5	Buta	TV Special	1			BUTA	
March 7 – September 19	Fate/Zero: Please! Einzbern Counseling Room	TV Special	6			Onegai! Aintsuberun sōdan-shitsu	
March 12	Li'l Spider Girl	TV Special	1			Wasurena gumo	
March 13 – March 19	Kid Icarus: Uprising	ONA	3			Shin-kō shinwa parutena no kagami	
March 14 – May 16, 2014	KenIchi: The Mightiest Disciple OVA	OVA	11			Shijō saikyō no deshi Ken'ichi ovu~a	
March 16 – June 15	A Town Where You Live: Crossing at Twilight	OVA	2			Kimi no iru machi tasogare kōsaten	
March 18	Marimo no Hana: Saikyou Butouha Shougakusei Densetsu	OVA	1			Mari mo no hana ~ saikyō budōha shōgakusei densetsu ~	
March 18	Nagareboshi Lens	OVA	1			Nagareboshi renzu	
March 19	Pukapuka Juju	TV Special	1			Pukapuka juju	
March 20	Shiranpuri (Special)	TV Special	1			Shiran puri	
March 20 – June 30	47 Todoufuken Specials	TV Special	2			47 Todō-fu inu 2012 natsu	
March 21	A Channel + smile	OVA	3			A chan'neru + smile (purasu sumairu)	
March 21	Cat God: Ohanami Ghostbusters	OVA	1			Nekogami yaoyorozu o hanami gōsutobasutāzu	
March 21 – May 25	Holy Knight	OVA	2			hōrī naito	
March 21 – August 29	High School DxD Specials	TV Special	6			Haisukūru D×D supesharu	
March 23 – August 24	Lagrange: The Flower of Rin-ne Specials	TV Special	6			Rin'ne no raguranje	
March 25 – April 1	Fate/Zero Remix	TV Special	2			Feito/zero Remix	
March 28	Lupin III 3DCG	TV Special	1			Rupan-sansei 3DCG	
March 28	Lupin VIII	TV Special	1			Rupan 8-sei	
April 3 – September 4	Daily Lives of High School Boys Specials	TV Special	6			Danshi kōkōsei no nichijō	
April 4	Shinken Seminar Koukou Kouza	OVA	1			Shinken zemi kōkō kōza	
April 4 – September 5	Amagami SS+ Plus: Extra Episode+ Plus	TV Special	6			Amagami SS+ plus ekusutora episōdo+ plus	
April 6	Koukyoushihen Eureka Seven: New Order	TV Special	1			Kōkyōshihen eureka sebun dai 51-wa 'nyū ōdā'	
April 6 – April 23, 2014	himitsukesshatakanotsume.jp	ONA	78			Himitsukesshatakanotsume.jp	
April 7 – June 9	Upotte!!	ONA	10			Upotte!!	
April 8 – October 7	Blood-C: None-None Gekijou	ONA	7			None none gekijō	
April 14	Detective Conan Bonus File: Fantasista Flower	OVA	1			Meitantei konan bōnasu FILE fantajisuta no hana	
April 18	Mermaid Licca-chan	OVA	1			Māmeidorika-chan	
April 20	Sacred Seven: Wings of the Silver Moon Picture Drama	TV Special	2			Gekijō-ban seikuriddo sebun – Gingetsu no tsubasa – pikuchā dorama	
April 20	Thermae Romae	TV Special	2			Terumae romae	
April 20	Thermae Romae: Kodai Romajin ga Uchuu e	ONA	1			Terumae romae kodai rōma hito ga uchū e	
April 20 – April 24, 2013	The Prince of Tennis II Specials	TV Special	7			Shin tenisu no ōjisama	
April 21	Yama ni Kagayaku: Guide-ken Heiji Gou	TV Special	1			Yama ni kagayaku gaido inu heijigō	
April 25	C^{3} - CubexCursedxCurious - Outdoor School Confusion	TV Special	1			Shīkyūbu - rinkan gakkō Kon fu ~yu ̄ji ~yon!	
May 24	Detective Conan OVA 12: The Miracle of Excalibur	OVA	1			Meitantei konan e kusu kariba ano kiseki	
May 25	Ai Mai! Moe Can Change!	OVA	1			Aimai! Moe Can chi ~enji!	
May 25 – August 17	PES: Peace Eco Smiles	ONA	7			PES: Peace Eco Smile	
May 25 – October 25, 2013	Star Blazers: Space Battleship Yamato 2199	OVA	26			Uchū senkan' yamato 2199	
May 26	Another: The Other	OVA	1			Anazā The azā - inga -	
May 26 – May 30	Blood-C: Special Edition	TV Special	2				
May 30 – June 27	Tight-rope	OVA	2			Taito rōpu	
June 3	Computer Kakumei: Saikyou x Saisoku no Zunou Tanjou	TV Special	1				
June 8 – November 9	Sankarea OVA	OVA	2			Sankarea	
June 15	Mahoutsukai Nara Miso wo Kue!	OVA	1			Mahōtsukai nara miso o kue!	
June 16	Stitch and the Planet of Sand	TV Special	1				
June 19 – July 5	Surprise 4 U.	ONA	2			SURPRISE 4 U.	
June 22	Top wo Nerae 2! Kagaku Kouza	TV Special	3				
June 23	Lagrange: The Flower of Rin-ne – Kamogawa Days	OVA	1			Rin'ne no raguranje Kamogawa deizu	
June 23	See Me After Class	OVA	1			Asa made jugyō chū!	
June 27	Tamayura: Hitotose - Attakai Kaze no Omoide, nanode	TV Special	1				
June 27 – November 28	Queen's Blade: Rebellion Specials	TV Special	6				
June 28	.hack//Versus: The Thanatos Report	TV Special	1				
June 28	The iDOLM@STER: 765 Pro to Iu Monogatari	TV Special	1			Aidorumasutā 765 puro to iu monogatari	
July 1	Lagrange: The Flower of Rin-ne Episode 00	TV Special	1				
July 3	Pokémon: Sing Meloetta - Search for the Rinka Berries	OVA	1				
July 7	Carnival Phantasm: HibiChika Special	TV Special	1				
July 8	Hyouka: What Should Be Had	OVA	1				
July 11	Papa no Iukoto wo Kikinasai!: Pokkapoka	TV Special	1				
July 14 – September 15	Ebiten	ONA	10				
July 17	Recorder to Randoseru	OVA	2				
July 25 – February 27, 2013	Accel World: Acchel World.	TV Special	8				
July 26	Guilty Crown: Lost Christmas	OVA	1				
July 27	Code Geass: Lelouch of the Rebellion - Nunnally in Wonderland	OVA	1				
July 27 – November 22	Dangerous Jiisan Ja	OVA	2				
July 27 – December 21	Shining Hearts: Bread of Happiness Picture Drama	TV Special	6				
July 27 – December 21	Shining Hearts: Bread of Happiness Specials	TV Special	6				
July 27 – March 22, 2013	Kuroko's Basketball Specials	TV Special	9				
July 30 – October 1	Otome wa Boku ni Koishiteru: Futari no Elder The Animation	OVA	3				
August 2	Corpse Party: Missing Footage	OVA	1				
August 3 – January 5, 2013	Today's Asuka Show	ONA	20				
August 3 – December 27, 2013	Nazotoki-hime wa Meitantei♥	OVA	6				
August 4	Yahabee	OVA	1				
August 5 – October 7	One Off	OVA	4				
August 8 – September 8, 2014	The Squid Girl OVA	OVA	3				
August 9	The Mystic Archives of Dantalian: Ibarahime	OVA	1				
August 11	Ichigeki Sacchuu!! Hoihoi-san: Legacy	ONA	1				
August 12	Zettai Junpaku♡Mahou Shoujo	OVA	1				
August 17 – April 3, 2015	To LOVE-Ru Darkness OVA	OVA	6				
August 18 – December 9	Tantei Opera Milky Holmes: Alternative	TV Special	2				
August 19 – November 28	Haruka Nogizaka's Secret Finale	OVA	4				
August 20 – August 31	Sukkiri!! x Eiga Himitsu no Akko-chan	TV Special	10				
August 22	Persona 4 the Animation: No One is Alone	TV Special	1				
August 23	Mysterious Girlfriend X: A Mysterious Summer Festival	OVA	1				
August 24	So, I Can't Play H! Recap	TV Special	1				
August 24	Tobidase! Dokan-kun Specials	TV Special	2				
August 25	One Piece: Episode of Nami - Tears of a Navigator and the Bonds of Friends	TV Special	1				
August 29	Natsu-iro Kiseki: 15-kaime no Natsuyasumi	OVA	1				
August 30	Yurumates 3D OVA	OVA	1				
August 31 – December 22	Kyousou Giga (2012)	ONA	5				
September 4 – November 4	Spy Penguin	OVA	5				
September 6 – May 31, 2013	High School DxD OVA	OVA	2				
September 13 – January 31, 2013	Accel World EX	OVA	2				
September 14	Cockroach Girls	ONA	2				
September 14 – February 22, 2013	Kremlin	ONA	5				
September 17	Yu☆Gi☆Oh! Zexal Special	TV Special	1				
September 19 – February 20, 2013	Humanity Has Declined Specials	TV Special	6				
September 20	Eureka Seven AO: Jungfrau no Hanabana-tachi	OVA	1				
September 21	Hashi no Mukou	ONA	1				
September 21 – February 22, 2013	Lagrange: The Flower of Rin-ne Season 2 Specials	TV Special	6				
September 26	Bakuman. 2nd Season Special	TV Special	1				
September 26	Haganai: A Round-Robin Story's Ending Is Way Extreme	OVA	1				
September 26	Hidamari Sketch x ☆☆☆ Recap	TV Special	1				
September 26	Inu X Boku Secret Service Episode 13	TV Special	1				
September 26	Koi to Senkyo to Chocolate: Ikenai Hazuki-sensei	TV Special	1				
September 26 – February 27, 2013	Aesthetica of a Rogue Hero Specials	TV Special	6				
September 26 – May 25, 2021	Hori-san to Miyamura-kun	OVA	6				
September 27 – October 31	Love, Chunibyo & Other Delusions!: Chuni-Shorts	ONA	6				
September 29 – January 2, 2013	Bakuman.: Deraman.	TV Special	2				
October 1	The Ambition of Oda Nobuna	TV Special	1				
October 3	Amagami SS+ Plus Picture Drama	TV Special	2				
October 3	Jormungand: Perfect Order Recap	TV Special	1				
October 5	Minami-ke Omatase	OVA	1				
October 5 – December 7	Aratanari Fukaki Ao	ONA	10				
October 9	Kunchi	ONA	1				
October 13	Upotte!! Miatte Waratte	OVA	1				
October 13 – December 15	Student Council's Discretion Level 2	ONA	10				
October 18 – December 18	The World God Only Knows: Tenri Arc	OVA	2				
October 19	Ippatsu Hicchuu!! Devander	OVA	1				
October 19	Usogui	OVA	1				
October 20	Is This a Zombie? Of the Dead OVA	OVA	1				
October 20	World's End	OVA	1				
October 20 – April 4, 2013	World War Blue	TV Special	3				
October 24 – June 26, 2013	Sword Art Offline	TV Special	9				
October 25	Karneval	OVA	1				
October 25	The iDOLM@STER Shiny Festa	OVA	3				
October 27	Puchimas!: Petit iDOLM@STER Episode 0	OVA	1				
October 28	Jinrui wa Suitai Shimashita: Ningen-san no, Yousei-san Memo	ONA	1				
November 1	Pokémon Mystery Dungeon: Gates to Infinity	ONA	2				
November 2	Lupin III: The Secret Page of Marco Polo	TV Special	1				
November 7	Acchi Kocchi: Place=Princess	TV Special	1				
November 9	Kono Danshi, Ningyo Hiroimashita.	OVA	1				
November 10 – October 28, 2015	Komachi to Dangorou	ONA	4				
November 13 – December 25	Girls & Panzer: Shoukai Shimasu!	TV Special	2				
November 19	Muv-Luv Alternative: Total Eclipse Recap - Climax Chokuzen Special	TV Special	1				
November 19 – December 10	Kokoro Connect OVA	TV Special	4				
November 21	Tsuritama: Harikitte Contest	TV Special	1				
November 22 – April 18, 2014	Owanko	ONA	7				
November 23	Haiyore! Nyaruko-san: Yasashii Teki no Shitome-kata	OVA	1				
November 28	Dusk Maiden of Amnesia: Ghost Girl	TV Special	1				
November 28	Yumekuri	OVA	1				
November 30	Sankarea: I, Too, Am... A Zombie...	TV Special	1				
November 30 – March 29, 2013	Ebiten: Kouritsu Ebisugawa Koukou Tenmonbu Specials	TV Special	5				
December 2 – December 16	Hiyokoi (2012)	TV Special	3				
December 2 – March 14, 2013	Hanayaka Nari, Waga Ichizoku: Kinetograph	OVA	2				
December 3 – August 23, 2013	Saint☆Young Men	OVA	2				
December 4 – March 4, 2013	Nurarihyon no Mago OVA	OVA	2				
December 7 – January 11, 2013	Kotoura-san: Haruka no Heya	ONA	6				
December 8	Yu☆Gi☆Oh! Zexal Second: Midokoro Tenkomori Special	TV Special	1				
December 12 – February 6, 2013	himitsukesshatakanotsume.jp Specials	TV Special	2				
December 15	One Piece: Episode of Luffy - Adventure on Hand Island	TV Special	1				
December 17 – March 15, 2013	Kindaichi Shounen no Jikenbo: Kuromajutsu Satsujin Jiken-hen	OVA	2				
December 17 – April 17, 2013	Code:Breaker OVA	OVA	3				
December 19	Lupin Shanshei	OVA	10				
December 19	Lupin Shanshei Pilot	TV Special	1				
December 19 – June 19, 2013	Love, Chunibyo & Other Delusions! Depth of Field: Love and Hate Theater	TV Special	7				
December 20 – December 1, 2015	Junjou Romantica OVA	OVA	2				
December 21	Cowboy Bebop: Ein's Summer Vacation	TV Special	1				
December 21	Kuroko's Basketball Special	TV Special	1				
December 21 – January 9, 2013	Tiger & Bunny Recaps	OVA	2				
December 21 – June 21, 2013	Girls & Panzer: Fushou Akiyama Yukari no Sensha Kouza	TV Special	6				
December 21 – June 21, 2013	Girls und Panzer OVA	TV Special	6				
December 23 – December 30	One Piece: Glorious Island	ONA	2				
December 25 – March 19, 2013	Inferno Cop	ONA	13				
December 26 – May 22, 2013	Say "I Love You".: Mei and Marshmallow Meow	TV Special	10				
December 26 – May 29, 2013	OniAi Specials	TV Special	6				
December 28 – March 17, 2013	Inferno Cop: Fact Files	ONA	12				
December 29	Boku no Imouto wa "Osaka Okan": Haishin Gentei Osaka Okan.	ONA	1				
December 31	D.C.III: Da Capo III Special	TV Special	1				
December 31	Nekomonogatari Black	TV Special	4				

== See also ==
- 2012 in Japanese television (general)
- 2012 in British television
- 2012 in Mexican television
- 2012 in animation
- 2012 in television
- 2012 phenomenon
