= Bad Tina =

- Bob's Burgers episode
- Episode no.: Season 2 Episode 8
- Directed by: Jennifer Coyle
- Written by: Holly Schlesinger
- Editing by: Mark Seymour
- Production code: 2ASA10
- Original air date: May 13, 2012

Guest appearances
- Melissa Bardin Galsky as Miss Jacobson; David Herman as Mr. Frond; Larry Murphy as Teddy; Laura Silverman as Andy; Sarah Silverman as Ollie; Jenny Slate as Tammy; Bobby Tisdale as Zeke

Episode chronology
← Previous "Moody Foodie"	Next → "Beefsquatch"
- Bob's Burgers season 2

"Bad Tina" is the eighth episode of the second season of the animated comedy series Bob's Burgers and the overall 21st episode, and is written by Holly Schlesinger and directed by Jennifer Coyle. It aired on Fox in the United States on May 13, 2012.

== Plot ==
Tina shows new girl Tammy around the school, but after the rebellious Tammy eggs her on, Tina shows her a spyhole into the boys locker room, but they get caught and sent to detention. The now-rebellious Tina starts to become upset with her parents, and when they leave her to babysit Gene and Louise while they see Cake (a show presenting patty-cake in the style of Stomp), she invites Tammy, Zeke and Jimmy Jr. to her house and Tammy convinces them to get drunk on margarita mix, until Jimmy Jr. accidentally breaks one of her porcelain toys and Tina tells them to leave. Tammy, however, steals Tina's notebook full of potentially embarrassing "erotic friend fiction" and blackmails her with it, while Gene and Louise force her to do their chores so they do not reveal the margarita party to their parents.

While trying to sneak out with margarita mix for Tammy, Tina gets caught and is grounded, and an upset Tammy warns her that she will read her friend fiction out at lunch the following day. The next morning, a distraught Tina finally cracks and tells her mom, Linda, everything, and Linda tells her that she's the only person who can make her feel embarrassed and not care what anyone else thinks. This cheers her up, and she decides to write some new friend fiction to read out herself instead. Gene and Louise, having found out about Tammy's blackmailing, steal back the notebook, but Tina still decides to read her story Buttloose (like Footloose but with "touching butts") only to have the entire cafeteria laugh at her, until Tammy has a sudden bout of flatulence, and the school laugh at her instead, causing her to flee with embarrassment, farting the whole way. Tina, now relieved, thinks that things have turned out OK...until Mr. Frond and Bob begin to patty-cake in front of the school, leading Tina to remark that "no one can embarrass you quite like your parents".

== Reception ==
The episode received a 1.8 rating and was watched by a total of 3.69 million people. This made it the fourth most watched show on Animation Domination that night, beating The Cleveland Show, but losing to American Dad!, The Simpsons and Family Guy with 4.94 million. Les Chappell of The A.V. Club gave the episode a B−, saying "All this is well and good, but there’s a lack of focus to the episode compared to other weeks, which makes me think that centering episodes chiefly on Tina aren’t the best way for the show to go. Tina’s such a passive character by definition that her actions usually come as a reaction to her more dynamic family members, and her flashes of independence (such as alter ego Dina in “Food Truckin’”) are muted enough to be overshadowed by the characters dragging her on that journey. And in terms of figures driving the action, Tammy’s relatively tame, her corrupting influence limited to a series of portmanteaus (Prudabaga, Glamsterdam, snorgasm) that confuse Bob and Linda when Tina uses them."
