= Dr. Yap =

- Bob's Burgers episode
- Episode no.: Season 2 Episode 6
- Directed by: Anthony Chun
- Written by: Steven Davis; Kelvin Yu
- Editing by: Mark Seymour
- Production code: 2ASA07
- Original air date: April 29, 2012

Guest appearances
- Rob Huebel as The Prince; Ken Jeong as Dr. Yap; Wendy Molyneux as the dental hygienist; Megan Mullally as Gayle; Larry Murphy as Teddy

Episode chronology
← Previous "Food Truckin'"	Next → "Moody Foodie"
- Bob's Burgers season 2

"Dr. Yap" is the sixth episode of the second season of the animated comedy series Bob's Burgers and the overall 19th episode, and is written by Steven Davis and Kelvin Yu and directed by Anthony Chun. It aired on Fox in the United States on April 29, 2012.

== Plot ==
Linda's sister Gayle unexpectedly shows up at the restaurant, on new medication and in high spirits. She intends to stay for a few days on the first stop of her "Eat Pray Love" tour of the world. Her gift of a jawbreaker to Gene inspires jealousy in Louise, who challenges Gene for it in a series of competitions such as a gross-drink contest (judged by Tina) and a contest to see who can listen to Teddy's boring stories about his towels the longest.

Meanwhile, Bob is seeing the family dentist, the lecherous Dr. Yap (Ken Jeong). After hearing Yap mention accidentally sticking a needle through a patient's cheek, Bob tries to distract Yap by asking about his guitar (named Greta) and his cabin in the mountains. He is ultimately unsuccessful, and Yap anesthetizes Bob. He wakes up and is picked up by Gayle, whom in his drugged state he believes to be Linda. They kiss in the car, and Gayle develops a crush on Bob. The next morning, Bob wakes up to Gayle announcing they are now a couple.

Bob worries about Linda's reaction, but to his surprise, Linda encourages them to date and even have sex, believing it will be good for Gayle's spirits and that she will quickly move onto another man. Uncomfortable with Gayle's attraction to him, Bob proposes to bring the family to Yap's cabin in the hopes Gayle and Yap will fall in love. They arrive and Yap and Gayle begin flirting, but she soon reveals she is only pretending to be interested in Yap as a cover so she and Bob can continue their affair.

Meanwhile, Gene and Louise continue to fight over the jawbreaker. Tina, who has a crush on Dr. Yap, discovers that Yap is using false and extremely misguided methods from the pickup artist "The Prince of Persuasia" to woo Gayle. Tina begins using the Prince's methods to try and pick up Yap.

Yap and the family go skiing. Gayle pursues Bob, Yap pursues Gayle, and Tina pursues Yap, leading to a chase. Bob veers off-course to a secluded area where Gene and Louise are building snowmen in a contest for the jawbreaker. He smashes into Louise's snowman, a depiction of herself holding the jawbreaker, and breaks his tooth on the jawbreaker. Gayle pursues Bob, interpreting his steering off-course as an invitation to have sex in the woods. Yap and Linda witness Gayle on top of Bob and become jealous.

Yap pulls Bob's tooth without anesthesia, causing him to faint. Tina is disturbed by Yap's violence and decides to stop pursuing him. Yap makes a move on Gayle, but Gayle rejects him, deciding to instead "wait for Bob to wake up." This causes Yap to break down. Linda comforts him, advising him to stop following the Prince of Persuasia's techniques. Remembering that Gayle always wanted whatever she had, hence her attraction to Bob, Linda declares she's in love with Dr. Yap. This makes Gayle instantly attracted to Yap, and the two leave to make love. Meanwhile, Gene and Louise, who lost the jawbreaker in the snow, begin fighting over Bob's tooth.

== Reception ==
The episode received a 1.9 rating and was watched by a total of 3.92 million people. This made it the fourth most watched show on Animation Domination that night, beating The Cleveland Show, but losing to a second episode of The Cleveland Show, The Simpsons and Family Guy with 5.63 million. Rowan Kaiser of The A.V. Club gave the episode a B+, saying "While the main storyline is cute, the highlight of the episode is the B-plot, involving Gene and Louise challenging each other for possession of a giant jawbreaker. Giving the two younger, louder children a story of escalating dares is as close to a comedic sure thing as you can get, and "Dr. Yap" doesn't disappoint. Each of the challenges is fun, from the initial "most disgusting drink" competition, to the kids stuffing snow down their pants for as long as they can. Having the kids be so reliably funny, both in how they're written and acted, ensures that Bob's Burgers can rely on having something good each episode while the producers tinker with other aspects of the show."
