= Bob Day Afternoon =

- Bob's Burgers episode
- Episode no.: Season 2 Episode 2
- Directed by: Wes Archer
- Written by: Dan Fybel; Rich Rinaldi
- Production code: 2ASA02
- Original air date: March 18, 2012

Guest appearances
- Kevin Kline as Mr. Fischoeder; Pamela Adlon as Olsen Benner; Craig Anton as the bank manager; Todd Barry as Hummer guy; Gary Cole as Sergeant Bosco; Bill Hader as Mickey; David Herman as Mr. Frond; Jay Johnston as Jimmy Pesto; Andy Kindler as Mort; Larry Murphy as Teddy

Episode chronology
| ← Previous "The Belchies" | Next → "Synchronized Swimming" |
- Bob's Burgers season 2

"Bob Day Afternoon" is the second episode of the second season of the animated comedy series Bob's Burgers and the overall 15th episode, and is written by Dan Fybel and Rich Rinaldi and directed by Wes Archer. It aired on Fox in the United States on March 18, 2012.

== Plot ==
After a bit of role-play training at home, Bob goes across the street to the bank in order to ask for a loan, despite having a low credit score and several outstanding loans with them already. Upon arriving at the bank, he is immediately rejected by the bank teller. Upon returning to Bob's Burgers, Bob sees several police cars, followed by a SWAT team and a series of news vans, heading back towards the bank. A police detective enters their store, announcing that there is a holdup and hostage situation in progress in the bank, and that he needs Bob's Burgers to act as a headquarters for the police response.

The bank robber Mickey requests pizza, and much to Bob's dismay, Jimmy Pesto takes the publicity opportunity to deliver it to them. Disgusted by Pesto's pizza, Mickey asks for burgers and requests for Bob to deliver them personally. During the hand off, a police sniper shoots at Mickey, who takes Bob hostage as well. A series of increasingly complicated group phone calls ensue between the police, Mickey, and the Belcher family, culminating in Bob being told that he should "hit the deck" in one hour.

Bob and the other hostages convince Mickey to surrender on his own terms; he decides that he wants to eat at Bob's Burgers before he is arrested. Mickey forms the hostages around himself as human shields to go to the restaurant, and also demands the police do the same into the bank. As Mickey eats, the bank is flooded with tear gas, incapacitating the police. Mickey tries to escape but is quickly caught. Bob is almost offered a loan from the teller, but an ink packet explodes in his pocket, revealing money that had been taken from the bank. Bob blames Mickey, but no one believes him. Mickey calls the family from jail, still on good terms with them all.

== Reception ==
The episode received a 2.1 rating and was watched by a total of 4.40 million people. This made it the fourth most watched show on Animation Domination that night, beating The Cleveland Show, but losing to American Dad!, The Simpsons and Family Guy with 5.61 million. Rowan Kaiser of The A.V. Club gave the episode an A−, saying "Bob Day Afternoon" is also structured to build and maintain humor. Bob tries to get his loan restructured at the bank across the street, which starts the episode off on a simple, strong emotional core. Then a robber comes in and takes hostages, which builds tension, adds a bunch of stressed out characters, and makes the middle third of the episode about the difficulties of communication, which is traditional comic gold."
