= Full Bars =

- Bob's Burgers episode
- Episode no.: Season 3 Episode 2
- Directed by: Boohwan Lim; Kyounghee Lim
- Written by: Steven Davis; Kelvin Yu
- Production code: 2ASA17
- Original air date: October 7, 2012

Guest appearances
- David Herman as Mr. Frond; Andy Kindler as Mort; Jay Johnston as Jimmy Pesto; Joe Lo Truglio as Bryce; Tim Meadows as Mike; Larry Murphy as Teddy; Eddie Pepitone as Reggie; Paul Rust as Milo; Samantha Shelton as Amanda

Episode chronology
← Previous "Ear-sy Rider"	Next → "Bob Fires the Kids"
- Bob's Burgers season 3

"Full Bars" is the second episode of the third season of the animated comedy series Bob's Burgers and the overall 24th episode, and is written by Steven Davis and Kelvin Yu and directed by Boohwan Lim and Kyounghee Lim. The episode premiered on October 7, 2012, in the United States on Fox. This marks the series first Halloween episode.

== Plot ==
On Halloween, the kids ask Bob to let them go trick-or-treating unsupervised for the first time. Teddy is happy as Bob and Linda can now attend his Halloween party. When they get there, everything is painted black and orange, including Teddy's guinea pig Frances. Seeing that Bob is the only one in the party not in costume, Teddy pulls out a fat suit from his closet for Bob to wear.

While trick-or-treating, the kids are disappointed by the lousy treats that the locals are giving. So they take a ferry to the nearby island called King's Head Island, home to a posh community. They meet up with two neighborhood boys, Milo and Ned, and are shocked to find that many houses are giving them full-size chocolate bars, something they're not used to back home. As the night gets late, Milo and Ned want to get out of the streets because Hell Hunt is soon approaching. Hell Hunt is when the teenagers in the neighborhood come out at night and attack any kids that are still on the streets. The teens arrive and the Belcher kids escape while Milo and Ned are caught. Louise and Gene are ready to board the ferry to get back home, but Tina feels they owe a debt to the neighborhood for having given them the best candy they ever had and they all decide to go rescue Milo and Ned who are being held hostage with other kids in a tennis court as the teens humiliate and force them to watch their candy be eaten.

Meanwhile, Teddy's party comes to a halt when Frances is found dead. Teddy assumes that someone murdered her and holds everyone at the party hostage until he finds out who was responsible. Linda spots black and orange hair on Bob's fat suit and Bob realizes that he might have killed Frances.

Louise steals a cell phone owned by Amanda, a teenage girl that the Hell Hunt boys have a crush on and uses it to lure the teens to Amanda's house for a skinny dipping party. The Belcher kids free the trick-or-treaters and then go to Amanda's house to get payback on the teens. They are spotted and the teens chase the Belcher kids down the street. The trick-or-treaters come out and fight back against the teens using the urine-filled balloons that they were going to use on them forcing the teens to retreat.

After Teddy holds a funeral for Frances, Bob confesses to having possibly killed her. But then it is revealed that Frances was 14 years old, unusually long for a guinea pig. Realizing that Frances might have died due to old age or exposure to the black and orange paint, Teddy finally lets everyone go home.

The Belcher kids go home to enjoy their candy, except for Gene, who lost all of his in the chase. Bob and Linda then recount to the kids the events that happened at Teddy's party, unaware of what they were really up to the entire night.

== Reception ==
Rowan Kaiser of The A.V. Club gave the episode a B+, saying "On the other hand, the parents' plot never comes together. Bob and Linda end up at Teddy's Halloween party. I theoretically like the idea of giving the ever-present, rarely examined Teddy more of a role, but in practice, he's much less funny. His guinea pig ends up dead at his Halloween party, which turns the story into a murder mystery. But instead of utilizing that format for character development and jokes based on all the people there, it's mostly Teddy being somewhat crazy and Bob itching to leave, and it ends up slightly disappointing, given the potential for greatness that a Halloween murder mystery should have. Still, the entire episode has a can't-miss premise, and it doesn't miss."

Ross Bonaime of Paste gave the episode an 8.4 out of 10, saying "Full Bars" once again focuses on Bob's Burgers' strengths, which the show does on a more regular basis than other animated sitcoms. "Having the three kids together on an adventure, especially one in a foreign land, brings some great laughs by themselves. Louise as the leader, Gene as the instigator and Tina as the one always a step behind, is such a fun dynamic that has yet to get old." The episode received a 2.3 rating and was watched by a total of 4.89 million people, this made it the fourth most watched show on Animation Domination that night beating The Cleveland Show but losing to Family Guy with 6.70 million.
