= Synchronized Swimming (Bob's Burgers) =

- Bob's Burgers episode
- Episode no.: Season 2 Episode 3
- Directed by: Anthony Chun
- Written by: Holly Schlesinger
- Production code: 2ASA03
- Original air date: March 25, 2012

Guest appearances
- Pamela Adlon as teenage girl #1; David Herman as Mr. Frond; Andy Kindler as Mort; Larry Murphy as Teddy; Laura Silverman as Andy; Sarah Silverman as Ollie; Declyn Thornton as Little League player #1

Episode chronology
← Previous "Bob Day Afternoon"	Next → "Burgerboss"
- Bob's Burgers season 2

"Synchronized Swimming" is the third episode of the second season of the animated comedy series Bob's Burgers and the overall 16th episode, and is written by Holly Schlesinger and directed by Anthony Chun. It aired on Fox in the United States on March 25, 2012.

== Plot ==
Linda is performing prenatal yoga, despite the fact that she has not been pregnant for nine years. The kids call her over from the television to help them with their homework, and Bob chastises Linda for coddling them. Later, Bob shows off his new soft serve ice cream machine to Teddy, dreaming of selling ice cream during the summer months. At school, the children complain about how much they hate gym class, and convince Mr. Frond to allow them to instead have an independent study of synchronized swimming, which they have no intention of actually doing.

The next morning, Bob shows the kids how to use the soft serve machine and Linda continues doing things for the kids, including making a Navajo mask for Gene's school project. Bob again chastises Linda for coddling. At school, the kids ditch gym class for their "independent study" and have fun around town. At Reflections, Linda runs into Mr. Frond, who mentions the kids' synchronized swimming study supposedly coached by Linda. Back at the restaurant, Linda announces to the children that she will be coaching them in synchronized swimming instead of letting them run around alone.

Later, Linda takes the kids to the community pool to begin their lessons, and Louise finds numerous ways of staying out of the water. At the restaurant, Bob finds himself swamped attempting to fill in for Linda and dealing with the new soft serve machine. The next day, several more children join the independent study, and Linda quits as coach when they continue to goof off and after Andy and Ollie naïvely blurt out that the independent study was made up. The kids think they have gotten out of work, and Mr. Frond finds them to let them know that the school board wishes to watch a performance that afternoon or face summer school. They beg for Linda's help, who refuses, and Bob decides to coach them because he needs them to work there over the summer.

At the pool, Louise finds several ways of attempting to get out of the performance, including pulling the fire alarm, and spraying talcum powder claiming that it is anthrax. In a last ditch effort, Louise defecates in the pool, requiring the lifeguard to drain the pool. The school board members are ready to shut down the performance, but Mr. Frond and Bob push for the performance to be completed in the empty pool. Linda arrives at the last minute to help them with a synchronized performance of her prenatal yoga. The kids receive a D in independent study and do not have to go to summer school.

== Reception ==
The episode received a 2.0 rating and was watched by a total of 3.97 million people. This made it the fourth most watched show on Animation Domination that night, beating The Cleveland Show, but losing to American Dad!, and repeats of The Simpsons and Family Guy with 4.57 million. Rowan Kaiser of The A.V. Club gave the episode a B+, saying "Tonight's episode had far more than the normal amount of these fanciful extended cutaways. And they were all, by and large, good. Bob's visions of floating off into happyland based on his new soft-serve machine were good stuff, as were the kids' remembrances of gym class (especially Tina getting hit in the head with a ball). There were just significantly more than usual. As a one-time thing, this could work. As a strategy for the show moving forward? I'm not so sure."
