= Moody Foodie =

- Bob's Burgers episode
- Episode no.: Season 2 Episode 7
- Directed by: Boohwan Lim; Kyounghee Lim
- Written by: Steven Davis; Kelvin Yu
- Editing by: Mark Seymour
- Production code: 2ASA06
- Original air date: May 6, 2012

Guest appearances
- Kevin Kline as Mr. Fischoeder; David Herman as Charac; Andy Kindler as Mort; Michael Madsen as Kevin Costner; Tim Meadows as Mike; Wendy Molyneux as a customer; Larry Murphy as Teddy; Oscar Nunez as Pepe; Patton Oswalt as Moody Foodie; Eddie Pepitone as Reggie; Russell Peters as Tran; Holly Schlesinger as Kathy

Episode chronology
← Previous "Dr. Yap"	Next → "Bad Tina"
- Bob's Burgers season 2

"Moody Foodie" is the seventh episode of the second season of the animated comedy series Bob's Burgers and the overall 20th episode, and is written by Steven Davis and Kelvin Yu and directed by Boohwan Lim and Kyounghee Lim. It aired on Fox in the United States on May 6, 2012.

== Plot ==
After a local restaurant closes following a bad review by a vicious food critic called the Moody Foodie (Patton Oswalt), one of Bob's friends and a fellow restaurant owner named Reggie warns Bob that his restaurant is next. Since the Moody Foodie always wears a disguise, Bob's family tries to work out which of their customers he could be until a man dressed as a Hasidic Jew comes in and wipes his hands with a blue handkerchief, his "tell." Unfortunately, the family make fools of themselves, culminating in Bob forgetting what the Moody Foodie's order was, and Gene accidentally setting the grill on fire. The local paper publishes a harsh review, which Bob angrily obsesses over.

After Tina suggests that he try a "redo", Bob heads to the Moody Foodie's house to make him another burger, but since he refuses to let him in, Bob and the kids force themselves in and tie him to a chair with duct tape. While Bob tries to feed him the "Girls Just Want to Have Fennel" Burger, Linda visits him with other restaurateurs who have been given bad reviews who now want their chance at a redo as well, and they force feed him their food and even one of his reviews, until a man delivering a package interrupts them. They tie him to a chair as well, and Louise opens the package to find a DVD of the movie Tin Cup, which Bob begins to mock as a bad movie. Everyone else says that it is not a bad movie, but Bob adamantly says it must be, until he realizes he has not seen it and only thinks that because of a bad review. This leads him to have an epiphany: the Moody Foodie's bad review was just him doing his job, and he should just let it go.

After paying the deliveryman $48 plus the DVD edition of Tin Cup to forget about what happened, they set the Moody Foodie and the deliveryman free, but not until one of the restaurateurs gives the Moody Foodie a wet willy (in a parody of the ear-cutting scene from Reservoir Dogs). Business in Bob's Burgers returns to normal after he gives discounts to anyone bringing in a copy of the review. Bob wonders why the cops have not come yet to arrest him yet. A flashback reveals that, after everyone left, the Moody Foodie actually intended to call the cops, but after he tried the burger, he enjoyed it so much he decided not to press charges.

== Reception ==
The episode received a 1.8 rating and was watched by a total of 3.72 million people. This made it the fourth most watched show on Animation Domination that night, beating The Cleveland Show, but losing to American Dad!, The Simpsons and Family Guy with 5.64 million. Rowan Kaiser of The A.V. Club gave the episode an A, saying "One of the reasons "Moody Foodie" works so well is that each of its situations allows the characters to behave in a different, amusing fashion. The nervousness of the Belcher family at the impending arrival of the critic puts Bob in the role of the straight man, with each of the other family members responding to the anxiety differently. Linda, usually one of the more difficult characters for the show to handle, may be best here, giving "pep talks" which do the opposite of pepping. Louise, of course, is an all-star throughout the episode, scoring with this suggestion: "Let's bribe him. Dad, take out the lettuce and replace it with this $20 bill that I took out of your wallet."
