= Hot to the Touch =

- Adventure Time episode
- Episode no.: Season 4 Episode 1
- Directed by: Larry Leichliter (Note: Director); Adam Muto (Note: Creative director); Nick Jennings (Note: Art director)
- Written by: Cole Sanchez; Rebecca Sugar
- Story by: Patrick McHale; Kent Osborne; Pendleton Ward
- Production code: 1008-082
- Original air date: April 2, 2012
- Running time: 11 minutes

Guest appearance
- Andy Milonakis as N.E.P.T.R.

Episode chronology
← Previous "Incendium"	Next → "Five Short Graybles"
- Adventure Time season 4

"Hot to the Touch" is the first episode of the fourth season of the American animated television series Adventure Time. The episode was written and storyboarded by Cole Sanchez and Rebecca Sugar, from a story by Patrick McHale, Kent Osborne, and Pendleton Ward. It originally aired on Cartoon Network on April 2, 2012. The episode serves as a direct continuation of the third season episode "Incendium".

The series follows the adventures of Finn (voiced by Jeremy Shada), a human boy, and his best friend and adoptive brother Jake (voiced by John DiMaggio), a dog with magical powers to change shape and grow and shrink at will. In this episode, Finn develops a crush on Flame Princess (voiced by Jessica DiCicco) and tries to get to know her, which proves difficult due to her destructive and uncontrollable power.

The episode was the first to be storyboarded by Sanchez and Sugar; Sugar's previous storyboard partner, Adam Muto, helped clean up the episode's drawings. Sugar wrote a short rap for the episode, rapped by Andy Milonakis. Originally, Sugar wanted Milonakis to write his own, but he felt the song was of quality and he wanted to rap Sugar's version. "Hot to the Touch" was seen by 2.655 million viewers and marked a significant increase in ratings for the series. It received largely positive critical reviews, with reviewers from both The A.V. Club and Slate applauding the episode's emotional range.

== Plot ==
After the events in Incendium, Finn pursues Flame Princess (voiced by Jessica DiCicco), trying to explain to her that he does not want to hurt her. However, Flame Princess, confused by Finn's aversion to fire, assumes that he merely wants to taunt her. She ventures to the Goblin Kingdom, intent on turning it into her new domain. Finn and Jake, meanwhile, return to the tree fort and, with the help of N.E.P.T.R. (voiced by Andy Milonakis), build flame-retardant battle robots.

The two heroes descend on the Goblin Kingdom, and begin putting out the fire; this, in turn, hurts Flame Princess, both emotionally and physically, judging from her shedding of a single tear. Finn, horrified at the pain he has caused the object of his affections, exits his robot and calls for Flame Princess's attention, before crying. The tears alert Flame Princess that Finn is a "water elemental", and that the two will only hurt each other, due to the opposition of their natural states.

== Production ==
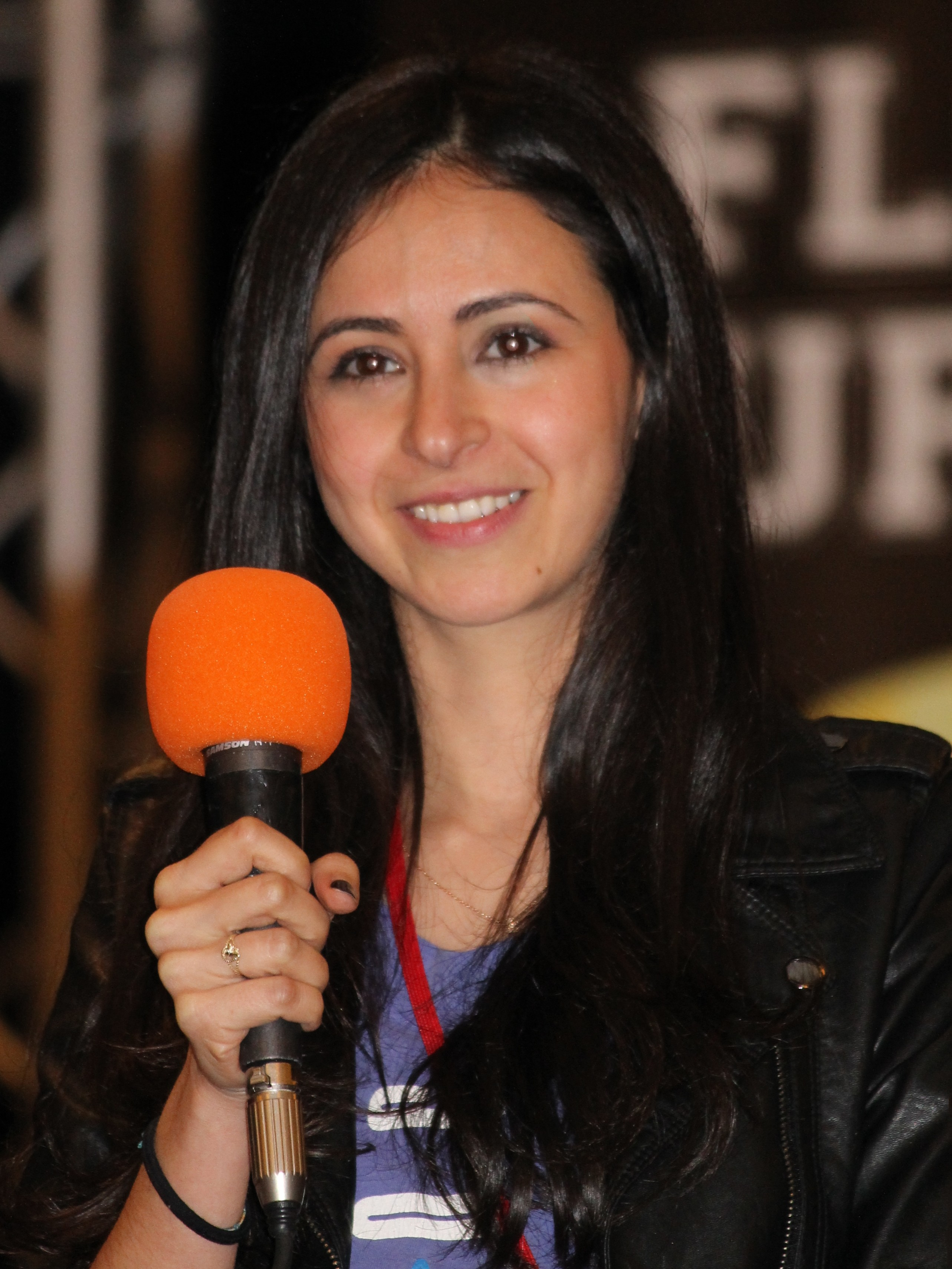
"Hot to the Touch" featured the second major appearance of Flame Princess, voiced by Jessica DiCicco.

"Hot to the Touch" was written and storyboarded by Cole Sanchez and Rebecca Sugar, from a story developed by series creator Pendleton Ward, Patrick McHale, and Kent Osborne. This was the first episode that Sugar and Sanchez worked on together; Sugar's previous partner Adam Muto served as the episode's creative director, and also helped clean up the episode's storyboards. Sugar was excited to get a chance to show how Flame Princess interacted in the Land of Ooo, because in "Incendium", she was only shown inside of her lantern. The line about Finn wanting to play BMO with Flame Princess was based on Sanchez's experiences with his high school girlfriend; he reasoned that, since Finn was younger, his ultimate idea of love would be to sit next to his love interest and play video games.

The episode features Andy Milonakis reprising his role as N.E.P.T.R., a character that was last seen in the first season episode "What is Life?" The short rap "Working for the Master" that is sung by N.E.P.T.R. was written by Sugar. She had originally planned for her demo version to merely be a "filler" track, as she expected Milonakis to want to write his own rap. To her surprise, however, Milonakis enjoyed Sugar's lyrics and insisted that he perform her version. Sugar's father, Rob, later released her demo version on his YouTube channel. Series composer Tim Kiefer produced the song's instrumental. Inspired by Wu-Tang Clan's penchant for sampling, Kieffer took his music from the season one episode "What is Life?" and edited it substantially, creating the "clattery bumpin' beat" featured in the episode.

== Reception ==
"Hot to the Touch" aired on Cartoon Network on April 2, 2012. The episode was seen by 2.655 million viewers. The episode also ranked as the number one telecast for all children demographics, according to Nielsen ratings. It also marked a 96 percent increase in ratings, when the numbers for "Hot to the Touch" were compared to the ratings for the same time period in 2011. The episode first saw physical release as part of the 2014 DVD, Princess Day, which included 16 episodes from the series' second through sixth seasons. It was later re-released as part of the complete fourth season DVD in October 2014.

Oliver Sava of The A.V. Club gave the episode a largely positive review, noting that "in the episode’s 10 minutes, the writers create an apt metaphor for pubescent dating, as Finn and FP struggle to make a relationship work." He noted the symbolism inherent in making Flame Princess a fire elemental, writing that "fire is the perfect element for a hormonal teenage princess, and FP can’t control her emotions, burning everything in her path as she reacts to Finn’s advances." Sava also complimented the return of N.E.P.T.R., as well as his short rap, which Sava called "a perfect little musical interlude at the midway point of the episode."

Mike Lechevaillier of Slate magazine, in a review of the fourth season, wrote that "it's frequently astonishing to observe the confidence and wide-ranging appeal with which Adventure Time unswervingly depicts the many stages of infatuation." The reviewer highlighted "Hot to the Touch" as an example of such an example, noting that Flame Princess represents "an uncomplicated yet vastly pertinent metaphor for the hypothesis that the closer you cherish someone, the likelier they are to singe your soft exterior and the easier it is for them to affectionately melt your exposed heart." Marc Snetiker of Entertainment Weekly awarded the episode a "B", noting that "the season four premiere of this inspired 'toon about a boy and his precocious dog is as colorful, clever, and unpredictably funny as ever."
