= Food Truckin' =

- Bob's Burgers episode
- Episode no.: Season 2 Episode 5
- Directed by: Bernard Derriman
- Written by: Lizzie Molyneux; Wendy Molyneux
- Editing by: Mark Seymour
- Production code: 2ASA05
- Original air date: April 15, 2012

Guest appearances
- Dave (Gruber) Allen as Bill; Jay Johnston as Foodie; Megan Mullally as Tabitha Johansson; Larry Murphy as Teddy; Dana Powell as Karen; Paul Scheer as Larry; Paul F. Tompkins as Randy Watkins

Episode chronology
| ← Previous "Burgerboss" | Next → "Dr. Yap" |
- Bob's Burgers season 2

"Food Truckin'" is the fifth episode of the second season of the animated comedy series Bob's Burgers and the overall 18th episode, and is written by Lizzie Molyneux and Wendy Molyneux and directed by Bernard Derriman. It aired on Fox in the United States on April 15, 2012.

== Plot ==
Numerous food trucks are parking on the street in front of the restaurant, stealing the customers. After several failed attempts to make the trucks leave, Bob ends up buying a food truck of his own. Teddy fixes up the truck, warning Bob that the grill cannot be on at the same time as the truck or it could result in a massive fireball. Gene proceeds to destroy the truck this way, and Teddy fixes it up again. Bob and the kids work from inside the truck and Linda is forced to stay inside watching the restaurant.

The food truck is doing well and Bob decides to take it on the go to get more money. Soon after, Linda shuts down the restaurant to join them on the road. Bob laments to Randy Watkins (Paul F. Tompkins) that he is still not turning a profit, and Randy mentions "Lolla-Pa-Foods-A" which has a $1,000 prize for the best food truck. The Belchers hit the road to the festival, with Linda driving who quickly gets road rage.

At the festival, Tina, who has reinvented herself as Dina, hands out free mini burgers to promote the truck and lies about the contents of the burgers to the festival-goers with a few being vegetarian. Louise and Gene taste-test other food truck fares and give bad reviews online, giving Bob's truck more business. Bob ends up winning the $1,000 prize before Linda accidentally lets the festival-goers in on one of the various lies. A riot ensues, and the Belchers (and Randy) are forced to hide in their food truck. After the festival-goers fall asleep, they manage to get away in the food truck before Randy starts the grill while driving, causing an explosion that forces everyone to walk back to town.

== Reception ==
The episode received a 1.9 rating and was watched by a total of 3.90 million people. This made it the fourth most watched show on Animation Domination that night, losing to The Cleveland Show, Family Guy and The Simpsons with 4.96 million. Rowan Kaiser of The A.V. Club gave the episode a B−, saying "So much of the episode hinges on the Bob–Randy relationship, and their move from rivals to, well, more-friendly rivals doesn't lead anywhere. Most of the rest of the episode works, though not as well as normal.... After the highs of this second season, "Food Truckin'" is a mild disappointment."
