= Incendium =

- Adventure Time episode
- Title Card
- Episode no.: Season 3 Episode 26
- Directed by: Larry Leichliter (Note: Director); Adam Muto (Note: Creative director); Nick Jennings (Note: Art director)
- Written by: Adam Muto; Rebecca Sugar
- Story by: Patrick McHale; Kent Osborne; Pendleton Ward; Mark Banker
- Production code: 1008-074
- Original air date: February 13, 2012
- Running time: 11 minutes

Episode chronology
← Previous "Dad's Dungeon"	Next → "Hot to the Touch"
- Adventure Time season 3

"Incendium" is the twenty-sixth and final episode of the third season of the American animated television series Adventure Time. The episode was written and storyboarded by Adam Muto and Rebecca Sugar, from a story by Mark Banker, Patrick McHale, Kent Osborne, and Pendleton Ward. It originally aired on Cartoon Network on February 13, 2012. The episode guest stars Keith David, and also features Jessica DiCicco, who would go on to play the recurring role of Flame Princess.

The series follows the adventures of Finn (voiced by Jeremy Shada), a human boy, and his best friend and adoptive brother Jake (voiced by John DiMaggio), a dog with magical powers to change shape and grow and shrink at will. In this episode, Jake seeks the Flame King's (voiced by David) consent for Finn to date his daughter, Flame Princess (voiced by DiCicco) in order to help a brokenhearted Finn. Jake eventually angers the princess, however, and she chases him back to the tree fort and confronts Finn himself. The episode's plot would be continued in the season four premiere "Hot to the Touch".

The impetus for this episode was the writers and producers not wanting to keep writing episodes in which Finn is continuously rejected by Princess Bubblegum. The character of Flame Princess was largely designed by Sugar, based on a rough drawing by storyboard revisionist and character designer Natasha Allegri. The episode received largely positive reviews from critics, with both David's and DiCicco's voice work earning praise.

== Plot ==
After Princess Bubblegum (voiced by Hynden Walch) scorns his advances, Finn falls into a serious depression and sings a woeful song about the romantic pain he feels, called "All Gummed Up Inside". Jake, worried about his brother, decides to find Finn a new love interest, and so he journeys to the Fire Kingdom, ruled by the evil Flame King (voiced by Keith David).

Jake bluffs that he is an emissary of "Prince Finn", ruler of the Grasslands. Jake attempts to court Flame King's daughter, Flame Princess (voiced by Jessica DiCicco) on Finn's behalf. After several disastrous attempts, including a performance of a rendition of Finn's song called "All Warmed Up Inside", Jake is told to leave. However, he uses his shape-shifting abilities to morph part of his body and make it look as if Finn has entered the palace. Jake-as-Finn then pretends to strangle Jake, which appeases Flame King. He applauds Finn's supposed butchery, agreeing to give him the hand of his evil daughter.

Jake, distressed that Flame Princess is apparently evil, bluntly rejects her advances as Finn, but this enrages her. Jake regretfully flees back to the Tree Fort, with the princess on his trails, leaving a trail of destruction in her path. Once there, Jake tries to explain what happened to Finn, but a struggle breaks out. In the confusion, Flame Princess is nearly killed by rain, but Finn saves her. When she regains her powers, she slaps him, warning him never to mess with her. The episode concludes with Finn noting that he now has a crush on Flame Princess.

== Production ==
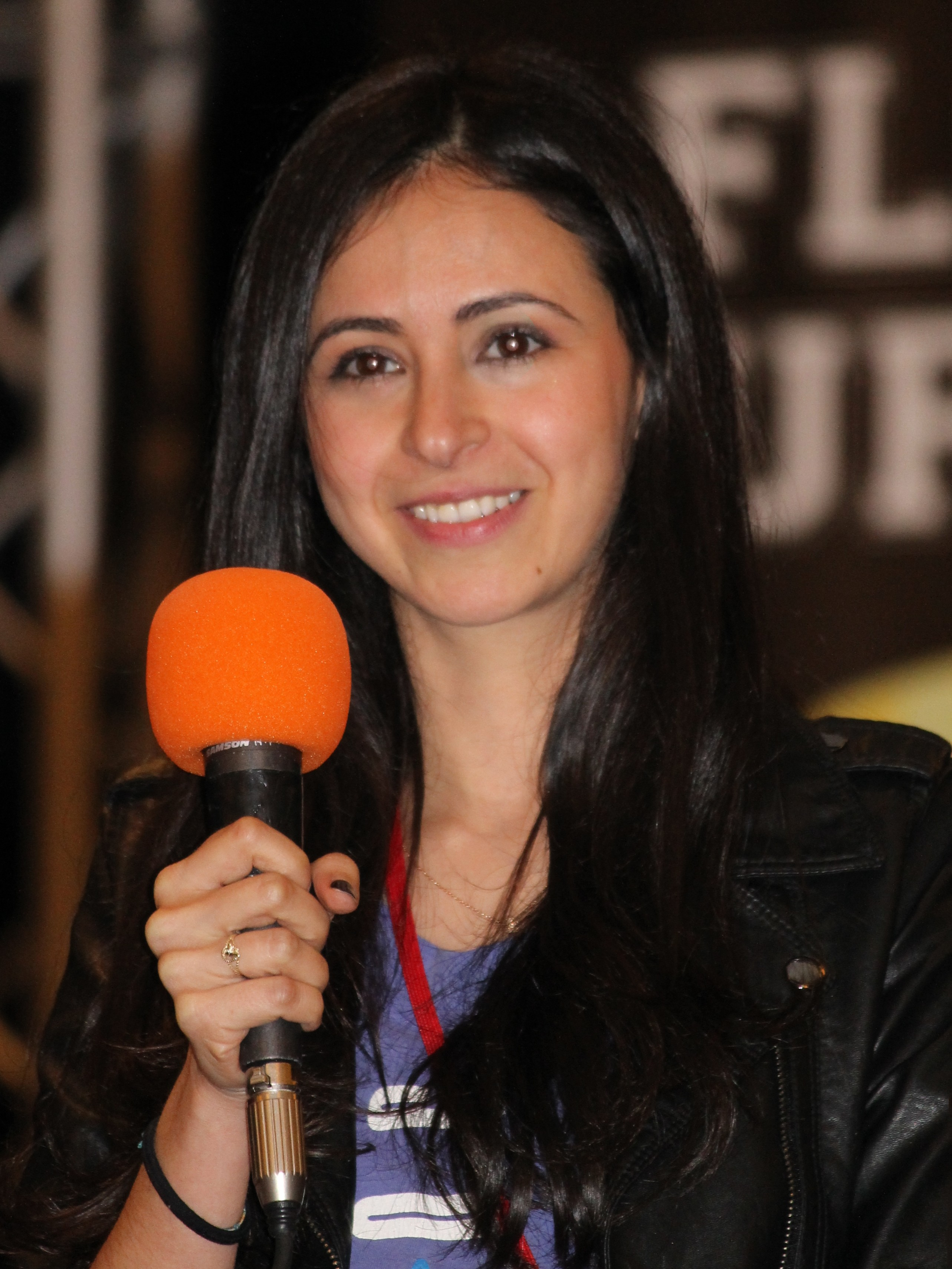
The episode introduced Flame Princess, voiced by Jessica DiCicco.

"Incendium" was written and storyboarded by Adam Muto and Rebecca Sugar from a story developed by Mark Banker, Patrick McHale, Osborne, and series creator Pendleton Ward. This was both the last episode to have been boarded by Sugar and Muto as a team, as well as the last to credit Muto as a storyboard artist; he was later promoted to creative director for the entirety of season four, as well as the first half of season five.

The impetus for this episode was the writers and producers not wanting to keep writing episodes in which Finn is continuously rejected by Princess Bubblegum. Because of the thematic undertones of romance and unrequited love, the episode had several emotional beats. Sugar later explained that, since she had first started on the show, she had attempted to storyboard a situation causing Finn to cry. Ward and the producers had vetoed this idea several times, because they felt it did not fit his personality. However, with "Incendium", Sugar noted that "the dam finally broke" and she was allowed to make Finn cry over his unreciprocated love of Princess Bubblegum. Sugar put as much "gut-wrenching imagery" at the start of the episode in order to emphasize the installment's pathos. Similarly, she "wanted to make Finn lose it" near the end to show how much his love of Princess Bubblegum was hurting him. As such, the fact that Finn chooses to save Flame Princess over the lock bubblegum's hair was used as a metaphor by the writers to show that Finn was getting over his fixation with Bubblegum.

The episode introduced Flame Princess, who would become a more important character in the following seasons; the character is voiced by Jessica DiCicco. Flame Princess was written to be "clueless", in that she was emotionally more immature than any of the other characters. This allowed other, usually immature characters like Finn to play off of her in a different and unique way. The design for the character was based on a rough drawing by Natasha Allegri. This drawing was later cleaned-up by Sugar; originally, she envisioned Flame Princess as being similar in coloring to a match, with "dark skin and fire for hair". Her sketches were later redesigned for the show by Andy Ristaino. When Sugar was redesigning the character, she added a gem in the middle of her forehead, which she claimed was inspired by the rudimentary designs for the characters in her series Steven Universe, which would air several years later.

== Reception ==
"Incendium" first aired on Cartoon Network on February 13, 2012. The episode first saw physical release as part of the 2013 Fionna and Cake DVD, which included 16 episodes from the series' second, third, and fourth seasons. It was later re-released as part of the complete third season DVD on February 25, 2014.

Dean Childers of TV Geek Army gave the episode a largely positive review, noting that it was "particularly well done." He noted that the twist that Flames Princess was evil was "great comedy" even though it "comes out of nowhere", and he also felt that the ending allowed for the episode to reach a higher level of excitement and interest. He also applauded the voice acting in the episode, writing, "[Keith David's] regal voice works wonderfully as a king in the world of Oo [sic] and his daughter [DiCicco] isn't lacking in the voice over department either."
