= The Belchies =

- Bob's Burgers episode
- Episode no.: Season 2 Episode 1
- Directed by: Boohwan Lim; Kyounghee Lim
- Written by: John Schroeder
- Production code: 2ASA01
- Original air date: March 11, 2012

Guest appearances
- Jay Johnston as Jimmy Pesto; Larry Murphy as Teddy; Laura Silverman as Andy; Sarah Silverman as Ollie; Bobby Tisdale as Zeke

Episode chronology
← Previous "Torpedo"	Next → "Bob Day Afternoon"
- Bob's Burgers season 2

"The Belchies" is the season premiere of the second season of the animated television series Bob's Burgers, and the 14th episode overall. The episode aired on Fox in the United States on March 11, 2012. The episode was written by John Schroeder and directed by Boohwan Lim and Kyounghee Lim. The episode is a parody of the 1985 film The Goonies and features a song by Cyndi Lauper.

== Plot ==
Teddy tells the Belcher kids that the abandoned taffy factory, which is scheduled for demolition the following day, contains hidden treasure. This turns out to be a joke, the punchline of which is that the map he draws looks like a butt, but Louise takes it seriously and convinces Gene and Tina to go with her that night to find the treasure. To Louise's frustration, Tina has invited Jimmy Pesto, Jr. to come along and wherever Jimmy Jr. goes, his best friend Zeke must go as well. Further complicating matters are Andy and Ollie Pesto, who show up randomly out of nowhere.

Meanwhile, Bob and Linda have their scheduled sex night, though they have difficulty getting in the mood, and their plans are interrupted by the discovery that the children snuck out. They go looking for them, becoming equally lost in the factory. Louise gets trapped in a pit with a man made of taffy, whom she names Taff and becomes close friends with during her isolation.

Eventually Bob and Linda reunite with the kids and they escape just in time to avoid being killed in the demolition. Louise wants to take Taff home with her, but Linda convinces her to throw him away. The episode ends with the revelation that the coastline around the factory perfectly matches the map drawn by Teddy, and that unbeknownst to the kids, Taff was full of gold bars. The episode ends with Cyndi Lauper singing a version of "The Goonies 'R' Good Enough" called "Taffy Butt," which describes the episode's ending.

== Reception ==
The episode received a 1.9 rating and was watched by a total of 4.04 million people. This made it the fourth most watched show on Animation Domination that night, beating The Cleveland Show, but losing to American Dad!, The Simpsons and Family Guy with 5.74 million. Rowan Kaiser of The A.V. Club gave the episode a B+, saying "If there's any issue with "The Belchies" it's that the episode is somewhat lacking in big laughs, which some of its animated brethren like Archer and even American Dad! succeed at causing. There's no shortage of chuckles, though, it's a good-humored episode in both senses of the word."

Dyanamaria Leifsson of TV Equals gave the episode a positive review, saying "We don't spend a whole lot of time in the restaurant, but "The Belchies" still delivers a simple story peppered with the kind of unexpected and outrageously funny lines that made me fall in love with Bob's Burgers in the first place."
