= Bob's Burgers season 2 =

Bob's Burgers
- Season 2
- DVD cover
- No. of episodes: 9

Release
- Original network: Fox
- Original release: March 11 – May 20, 2012

Season chronology
- ← Previous; Season 1 Next → Season 3

The second season of the animated sitcom Bob's Burgers began airing on Fox in the United States on March 11, 2012, and concluded on May 20, 2012. The season was produced by Wilo Productions and Buck & Millie Productions in association with 20th Century Fox Television, and is distributed by 20th Century Fox Home Entertainment, along with its other seasons. Actors H. Jon Benjamin, John Roberts, Dan Mintz, Eugene Mirman and Kristen Schaal reprised their roles as Bob Belcher, Linda Belcher, Tina Belcher, Gene Belcher and Louise Belcher. These characters are all a part of the Belcher family, a nuclear family that runs a hamburger restaurant titled Bob's Burgers. The series started using Toon Boom Harmony instead of Adobe Flash.

== Production ==
FOX renewed the show for a second production cycle consisting of thirteen episodes on April 7, 2011, and picked up the back nine on October 31, 2011, bringing the cycle to a total of 22 episodes. Only nine of the episodes aired during the second season, with the remaining 13 episodes being held for the third season of the show.

Like the previous season, the second season aired in the competitive timeslot at 8:30 p.m. on Sundays. The season premiere, "The Belchies", obtained 4.04 million viewers in the United States. The season finale, "Beefsquatch", obtained 3.57 million viewers in the United States, slightly down from the season premiere. All of these ratings are measured by Nielsen ratings.

Bob's Burgers ended its second season with a per episode average of 4.18 million total viewers and a 2.3 ratings share in the 18–49 demographic. The season was generally well received by television critics. Most agreed that the second season was a considerable improvement over the first season of the series, particularly "Moody Foodie", "Burgerboss", and "Bob Day Afternoon". Rowan Kaiser of The A.V. Club claimed that "after an uneven start, Bob's Burgers is becoming one of television’s best comedies!"

On May 7, 2013, Amazon.com released the season for purchase on "Burn-On-Demand DVD-R. The sole bonus feature is a table read of the season 3 episode An Indecent Thanksgiving Proposal.

== Episodes ==
No. overall	No. in season	Title	Directed by	Written by	Original release date	Prod. code	U.S. viewers (millions)
14	1	"The Belchies"	Boohwan Lim & Kyounghee Lim	Jon Schroeder	March 11, 2012	2ASA01	4.04
The kids hear rumor of a hidden treasure in an abandoned taffy factory and sneak off to look for it the night before the factory's demolition. Bob and Linda's plans for a romantic night together are interrupted when they realize their kids are gone, and they begin a search of the factory for them. Everyone has to work together to escape when Louise becomes trapped and the demolition begins ahead of schedule.
15	2	"Bob Day Afternoon"	Wes Archer	Dan Fybel & Rich Rinaldi	March 18, 2012	2ASA02	4.40
Bob and Linda decide to take an opportunity to promote their restaurant when a bank robbery/hostage situation explodes across the street, but the robber, a low-level criminal named Mickey (voiced by Bill Hader) ends up taking Bob as a hostage.
16	3	"Synchronized Swimming"	Anthony Chun	Holly Schlesinger	March 25, 2012	2ASA03	3.97
The kids find a way to escape gym class by doing a bogus independent study of synchronized swimming, but things get complicated when Linda becomes their synchronized swimming instructor and Mr. Frond wants the kids to show off their routine in front of the school board. Meanwhile, Bob welcomes a new ice cream machine into the restaurant.
17	4	"Burgerboss"	Jennifer Coyle	Scott Jacobson	April 1, 2012	2ASA04	3.66
Bob gets a burger-themed arcade cabinet for the restaurant. After Jimmy Pesto gets the high score and writes "BOB SUX" on the leader board, Bob becomes obsessed with trying to beat Pesto's score. When Bob's obsession starts to affect business, Linda gets rid of the cabinet, but Bob follows it to its new home at an arcade where Darryl, a gaming whiz, helps Bob try to beat Pesto's score. Meanwhile, the Belcher kids take advantage of Bob's gaming obsession by party crashing birthdays at the arcade. Guest star (and first appearance of) Aziz Ansari as DRL ("Darryl")
18	5	"Food Truckin'"	Bernard Derriman	Lizzie Molyneux & Wendy Molyneux	April 15, 2012	2ASA05	3.90
After food trucks start stealing their customers, Bob buys a food truck of his own to fight back. Operating out of a truck turns out to be harder than the Belchers anticipated and they turn to social media and catering events to increase business. When the Lolla-Pa-Foods-A Festival comes up, the Belchers attend and the kids try to help increase business, but their ethically questionable tactics ultimately start a riot among the food truckers and festival attendees.
19	6	"Dr. Yap"	Anthony Chun	Steven Davis & Kelvin Yu	April 29, 2012	2ASA07	3.92
While Bob is medicated, he mistakes Linda's sister, Gayle, for his wife and kisses her. After she falls for him, Bob seeks help from Dr. Yap.
20	7	"Moody Foodie"	Boohwan Lim & Kyounghee Lim	Steven Davis & Kelvin Yu	May 6, 2012	2ASA06	3.72
Bob learns that a vicious undercover food critic known as the Moody Foodie (voiced by Patton Oswalt) is in the neighborhood. The extra stress causes things to go awry and Bob's Burgers receives a negative review which begins to affect business. Seeking to get a review redo, Bob visits the critic's home but it only makes things worse. Bob's restaurateur friends arrive for their own review redos, but soon realize getting revenge is also an option.
21	8	"Bad Tina"	Jennifer Coyle	Holly Schlesinger	May 13, 2012	2ASA10	3.69
Tina starts hanging out with bad girl, Tammy (voiced by Jenny Slate), in an effort to get closer to Jimmy Junior.
22	9	"Beefsquatch"	Wes Archer	Nora Smith	May 20, 2012	2ASA09	3.57
Bob appears in a cooking segment on a local news morning program, but Gene steals the show when he crashes the set with a Sasquatch mask.

== Broadcast and reception ==
=== Ratings ===
The second season of Bob's Burgers originally premiered on March 11, 2012 in the United States on the Fox network between 8:30 p.m. and 9:00 p.m., with "The Belchies", and obtained 4.04 million viewers in the United States. They are all of episodes which are part of Fox's Animation Domination television block. It was preceded by The Simpsons at 8:00 p.m., and was followed by Family Guy at 9:00 p.m. The season finale, "Beefsquatch", obtained 3.57 million viewers in the United States.

Despite its middling ratings, Bob's Burgers was renewed for a third season, on May 14, 2012, alongside the cancellation of Napoleon Dynamite.

=== Critical response ===
The second season of Bob's Burgers was well received by television critics, particularly "Moody Foodie", "Burgerboss", and "Bob Day Afternoon". It received a "78 out of 100" on aggregate site Metacritic. Rowan Kaiser of The A.V. Club claimed that "after an uneven start, Bob's Burgers is becoming one of television's best comedies!". Alan Sepinwall of HitFix claimed that "the season's first two episodes aren't as consistently funny as last spring's best outings, but they do a good job of showcasing both the style of Bob's Burgers and the deep roster of characters the show has already assembled". Sepinwall claimed that it was "strange, and I often like strange in my comedy, but at least initially, I didn't find it funny. But it was compelling in its weirdness — one early episode had the family becoming obsessed with the cow a protest filmmaker had parked outside their restaurant — and that kept me watching until the rest of the show clicked for me". Maureen Ryan of The Huffington Post stated that "an animated comedy that is propelled by a very strong voice cast and by its own daffy comedic momentum", and compared it to Breaking In. Chris Cabin of The Slant Magazine called the season "improbably poignant". Cabin also claimed that it "possesses an unmistakable love for underdogs and odd ducks". Clark Collis of Entertainment Weekly noted that "While the show's attempt to please different generations is sometimes more jarring than jocular, this episode does feature the best non sequitur gag you're ever likely to hear about the Parliament song "Aqua Boogie"".

=== International broadcast ===
The season was first broadcast on the Global Television Network in Canada on March 11, 2012, between 8:30 p.m. and 9:00 p.m., as part of the Animation Rules comedy television block. It has the same schedule as the Fox network for the season. In the United Kingdom, the season premiered on May 1, 2012, at 10:30 p.m., on E4, (it is shown after the other FOX animated series, The Cleveland Show).
