= Beefsquatch =

- Bob's Burgers episode
- Episode no.: Season 2 Episode 9
- Directed by: Wes Archer
- Written by: Nora Smith
- Production code: 2ASA09
- Original air date: May 20, 2012
- Running time: 22 minutes

Guest appearances
- Kevin Kline as Mr. Fischoeder; Samantha Bee as Pam; Nathan Fielder as Nathan; David Herman as Kevin; Andy Kindler as Mort; Thomas Lennon as Chuck; Larry Murphy as Teddy; Sam Seder as Hugo Habercore

Episode chronology
← Previous "Bad Tina"	Next → "Ear-sy Rider"
- Bob's Burgers season 2

"Beefsquatch" is the ninth and final episode of the second season of the animated comedy series Bob's Burgers. The episode premiered on May 20, 2012, in the United States on Fox. In the episode, Bob appears in a cooking segment for a talk show. He appears alongside Gene, and they become rivals when Gene makes fun of Bob around other people.

The episode was written by Nora Smith and directed by Wes Archer. "Beefsquatch" was well received by critics, who praised its storylines. Upon airing, "Beefsquatch" obtained 3.568 million viewers and a 1.7 rating in the 18–49 demographic, according to Nielsen ratings.

== Plot ==
Linda convinces Bob to audition for "Hey Good Cookin'", a cooking segment on the local morning news show Get on Up with married news anchors Chuck and Pam. While Linda is filming Bob, Gene appears in the video wearing a Sasquatch mask and going after the burger Bob just made for attention. The audition tape is picked not because of Bob's cooking, but because of the comical duo of Bob and Gene. In their first appearance, Gene wears his Sasquatch mask and wrecks Bob's cooking segment as he did before. The act becomes an instant success, and Gene names his character Beefsquatch. Meanwhile, Nathan, a boy in the studio audience for Get on Up asks Tina if she is close with Pam, which gets him really excited. He convinces Tina to become his girlfriend.

Business at Bob's Burgers goes up due to Gene's fame, but Bob is not happy. When the Belcher family gets invited to Chuck and Pam's pool party, Pam secretly confides to Linda that she and Chuck are getting a divorce. Bob gets angry when Gene mocks him at the party. To get revenge, he asks for Louise's help to pull a prank on Gene during their next segment. Gene also asks for her help to do the same. During the segment, Bob finds that his cooking utensils have been glued to his hands but manages to sneak habanero peppers into the burger that Gene eats.

As the weeks go by, the prank wars become more intense, and popular with the audience, but Linda worries that the family is falling apart. Louise reveals that she has been helping both Bob and Gene with their pranks without the other knowing and announces that she is quitting. With no other options left, Linda tries to get Chuck and Pam to end the show, but they refuse and kick Linda out of the studio.

Tina breaks up with Nathan when she realizes he is only using her to get close to Pam and taste her hair. Nathan manages to sneak into Pam's dressing room disguised as Tina and attacks Pam. Tina tries to stop Nathan and the two are thrown out of the studio, along with Louise.

While filming the next episode of "Hey Good Cookin'", Gene and Bob get into a fight. Linda breaks back into the studio and tries to ruin the show by cursing in front of the camera, but does not know any so she pulls up her shirt to reveal her breasts on live TV. Bob and Gene apologize to each other, reconcile, and decide to join Linda in flashing to the camera. Get on Up is canceled as a result of the controversy which causes both Chuck and Pam to be fired.

== Reception ==
"Beefsquatch" was originally broadcast on May 20, 2012, in the United States on Fox between 8:30 p.m. and 9:00 p.m., as part of Fox's animation television block Animation Domination, preceded by The Cleveland Show and The Simpsons and following the one-hour finale of Family Guy. Upon airing, "Beefsquatch" obtained 3.568 million viewers despite airing simultaneously with The Apprentice on NBC, a television movie Jesse Stone: Benefit of the Doubt on CBS and The Billboard Music Awards on ABC. It acquired and a 1.7 rating in the 18–49 demographic, according to Nielsen ratings, meaning that it was seen by 0.9% of all 18- to 49-year-olds. The episode's ratings slightly dropped from the previous episode.

"Beefsquatch" was well received by television critics. Rowan Kaiser of The A.V. Club claimed that "Manic energy makes Bob's Burgers work best, so having a little too much of it isn't likely to turn the show bad." Despite this, Kaiser claimed that "we get that crazy energy, but it gets excessive. There's a lot of shouting here, without much to balance it out." Kaiser noted that the episode "leans almost entirely Gene, separating the kids from one another for most of the show." He also noted that "It also doesn't help that the boy is so over-the-top awkward that it isn't really a respite, just more crazy." Kaiser concluded his review by giving the episode a grade of "B". Dyanamaria Leifsson of TV Equals also enjoyed the episode, mentioning that "Tina had a funny little side story of her own at the TV studios." Leifsson enjoyed Linda's cursing, claiming that it "was probably the funniest gag of the night, in part because it was set up so perfectly." Leifsson also enjoyed Teddy's commentary with Linda at the end of the episode. She also enjoyed Linda's "hilarious dag-nabbit-peep-lubbin-nuts nonsense that took the gag in a totally different – and much more funny – direction." Leifsson concluded her review by claiming that "the summer will seem very long without new Bob's Burgers on Sunday nights and I'm already looking forward to seeing the remaining thirteen episodes as well as the brand new season 3 episodes that are in the works.
