= Ear-sy Rider =

- Bob's Burgers episode
- Episode no.: Season 3 Episode 1
- Directed by: Anthony Chun
- Written by: Dan Fybel; Rich Rinaldi
- Production code: 2ASA13
- Original air date: September 30, 2012

Guest appearances
- Kurt Braunohler as Logan; Ben Garant as Critter; David Herman as Mr. Frond; Kyle Kinane as Rat Daddy; Andy Kindler as Mort; Wendi McLendon-Covey as Mudflap; Larry Murphy as Teddy; Laura Silverman as Andy; Sarah Silverman as Ollie; Lindsey Stoddart as Cynthia

Episode chronology
← Previous "Beefsquatch"	Next → "Full Bars"
- Bob's Burgers season 3

"Ear-sy Rider" is the first episode of the third season of the animated comedy series Bob's Burgers and the overall 23rd episode, and is written by Dan Fybel and Rich Rinaldi and directed by Anthony Chun. The episode premiered on September 30, 2012 in the United States on Fox.

== Plot ==
Mort is holding a funeral for Horny Dave, the head of an outlaw motorcycle club called the "One-Eyed Snakes". After the ceremony, the gang goes to Bob's Burgers to have beers, much to Bob's dismay. After having wrecked much of the restaurant, Critter, the new leader of the "One-Eyed Snakes", pays for the damage and gives Bob a card which he can use to ask the gang for a favor in the future.

Meanwhile, the kids are crossing by a street corner which is often occupied by skateboarding teenagers after school. Louise taunts Logan, one of the teens, to the point where he grabs Louise's bunny ears and runs off. Louise, unable to cope with the loss, starts to act crazy and wears a hoodie as a replacement, though she is determined to get her bunny ears back. When bribery fails, Louise begins to follow and stalk Logan in numerous desperate attempts to get them back. Logan is resistant because he believes that the bunny ears have given him good luck. She finally tattles on Logan to his parents. When his parents confront him, Logan tells Louise that he had them sent to the dumpster. Louise tries to track them down to the waste management plant, but it is believed that they are incinerated and she is too late.

This brings Louise to her breaking point as she plots revenge. She cashes in the "One-Eyed Snakes" card and the gang arrives to threaten Logan. He confesses to never having thrown the bunny ears away and pulls them out of his backpack to give back to Louise. The gang returns to Bob's Burgers to celebrate, as Louise tells them food and drinks are on the house.

Having learned that their son was threatened, Logan's family gathers the neighbors and they all confront the "One-Eyed Snakes" in the restaurant. When Linda gets into a fight with Logan's mom, Critter tries to break it up, until Logan's mom accidentally tears off Horny Dave's jacket from Critter, and a standoff between the neighbors and the "One-Eyed Snakes" ensues. Critter, in an attempt to prove his leadership, plans to beat the neighbors up, but before the fight can begin, Mudflap, Horny Dave's pregnant lover, who Critter had sex with, goes into labor. Logan's dad is a doctor and takes charge of the delivery, where everyone in the restaurant lends a hand. After the baby is born, Mudflap confesses to Critter that he is the child's biological father.

Everyone is at peace, except for Louise and Logan, who were looking forward to the fight, though Louise is happy to have her ears back.

== Reception ==
Rowan Kaiser of The A.V. Club gave the episode an A−, saying "'Ear-sy Rider' ... acts as an extraordinarily effective traditional season première in that it demonstrates the best and most representative qualities of Bob’s Burgers. This show is already great on a regular basis, and the third season has the chance to solidify it as one of the best on TV."

Ross Bonaime of Paste gave the episode an 8.2 out of 10, saying "“Ear-sy Rider” does a great job of combining two seemingly unconnected stories, into a predictable, yet fun way. The show uses the ideas of family unity and just how insane the Belchers can be, into a great start to the third season and showcases why Bob’s Burgers is the best animated show on television today." The episode received a 2.6 rating and was watched by a total of 5.46 million people, this made it the third most watched show on Animation Domination that night beating American Dad! but losing to The Simpsons with 8.08 million.
