= Yurumates =

Japanese four-panel manga series

ゆるめいつ (Yurumeitsu)
- Genre: Comedy
- Manga
- Written by: saxyun
- Published by: Takeshobo
- Magazine: Manga Club
- Original run: June 2005 – March 2020
- Volumes: 8
- Original video animation
- Directed by: Tomohiro Tsukimisato
- Studio: Triple A
- Released: April 24, 2009
- Runtime: 36 minutes
- Original video animation

Yurumates wa? ゆるめいつ は？
- Released: June 24, 2011
- Runtime: 34 minutes
- Anime television series

Yurumates 3D ゆるめいつ 3でぃ
- Directed by: Tomohiro Yamanishi (chief); Yoshihide Yuuzumi
- Studio: C2C
- Original network: Sun Television, tvk
- Original run: April 2, 2012 – October 5, 2012
- Episodes: 26

Yurumates (Japanese: ゆるめいつ, Hepburn: Yurumeitsu; "Relaxed Roommates") is a Japanese four-panel manga series written and illustrated by Saxyun. The series revolves around four university students living together in a cheap apartment building. It has been adapted into two OVAs and an anime series that premiered April 2012 under the name Yurumates 3D.

The first volume of manga sold 100,000 copies in Japan.

== Characters ==
Yurume Aida (相田 ゆるめ, Aida Yurume)
Voiced by: Halko Momoi
Sae Kawano (川野 サエ, Kawano Sae)
Voiced by: Natsuko Kuwatani
Kumi Tanaka (田中 くみ, Tanaka Kumi)
Voiced by: Miyu Matsuki
Matsukichi (松吉)
Voiced by: Satoshi Hino
Sae's sister (サエの妹, Sae no Imōto)
Voiced by: Ayana Taketatsu
Landlord (大家, Ōya)
Voiced by: Mayu Miyazaki
Yurume's mother (ゆるめの母, Yurume no Haha)
Voiced by: Mayu Miyazaki (OVA), Kanami Satō (TV)
