= If the Pig Had Wings =

Kdyby prase mělo křídla If the Pig Had Wings

Compilation album by Petr Skoumal
- Released: 1991
- Recorded: 1990–1991
- Genre: Children's music
- Language: Czech
- Producer: Bonton

Kdyby prase mělo křídla (If the Pig Had Wings) is an album for children. It includes songs by Petr Skoumal, based on rhymes by Emanuel Frynta and Pavel Šrut. The album was recorded in the studio of Petr Skoumal in 1990-1991 and produced by Bonton in 1991. A remastered version was released by Supraphon in March 2012.

The title song is based on a rhyme "If Pigs Could Fly" by James Reeves. In 1996, Petr Skoumal together with stage director Jan Borna and actor Jan Vondráček turned the album into a performance staged in Divadlo v Dlouhé. It was on the repertoire till March 2013, at which point 288 performances had been staged.

== Track listing ==
format: Title translated to English (Czech title) /lyrics/ performer (length)

1. "Sandals (Sandály)" /Emanuel Frynta/ Petr Skoumal, C & K Vocal (1:46)
2. "The Like (Pod)" /Emanuel Frynta/ Petr Skoumal (4:09)
3. "Tiger (Tygr)" /Emanuel Frynta/ Petr Skoumal (1:59)
4. "Annies (Ančičky)" /Emanuel Frynta/ Petr Skoumal (1:38)
5. "Kangaroo (Klokan)" /Emanuel Frynta/ Petr Skoumal, C & K Vocal (0:58)
6. "Puppy (Štěně)" /Emanuel Frynta/ Jiří Cerha (2:07)
7. "How many are in the World (Kolik je na světě)" /Jan Vodňanský/ Petr Skoumal, Hana Horká (3:01)
8. "If the Pig Had Wings (Kdyby prase mělo křídla)" /James Reeves, Pavel Šrut/ Oldřich Kaiser & Jiří Lábus (1:30)
9. "All the Acquaintances (Samí známí)" /Emanuel Frynta/ Petr Skoumal (2:37)
10. "Five Witches (5 ježibab)" /Pavel Šrut/ Jan Hartl, C & K Vocal (1:16)
11. "Little Owl (Sýček)" /Emanuel Frynta/ Jiří Malšovský, C & K Vocal (1:26)
12. "Five Mice (Pět myšů)" /Emanuel Frynta/ Petr Skoumal (2:16)
13. "Mr. Šatra (Pan Šatra)" /Emanuel Frynta/ Petr Skoumal (2:07)
14. "Woodworm (Červotoč)" /Emanuel Frynta/ Petr Skoumal (1:22)
15. "Deer (Jeleni)" /Emanuel Frynta/ Petr Skoumal (2:09)
16. "Polecats (Tchoři)" /Emanuel Frynta/ C & K Vocal (0:47)
17. "Snail (Plž)" /Emanuel Frynta/ Petr Skoumal (1:15)
18. "Sparrows (Vrabčáci)" /Emanuel Frynta/ Petr Skoumal (1:02)
19. "Snake and Reptile (Had a plaz)" /Pavel Šrut/ Petr Skoumal (0:53)
20. "Elephants (Sloní)" /Pavel Šrut/ Lubor Šonka, Jarka Krečmerová, Jan Hartl (0:48)
21. "When a Small Beaver Goes to Sleep (Když jde malý bobr spát)" (Jan Vodňanský) Petr Skoumal, C & K Vocal (2:56)
22. "Mill (Mlýnek)" /František Halas/ Petr Skoumal, Hana Horká (2:46)
23. "Mole (Krtek)" /Emanuel Frynta/ Jiří Cerha (2:20)
24. "Unfortunately (Bohužel)" /Pavel Šrut/ Petr Skoumal (1:40)
25. "On a Camel (Na velbloudu)" /Petr Skoumal/ Petr Skoumal (2:53)
26. "House Mouse (Myš domácí)" /Emanuel Frynta/ Petr Skoumal (2:55)
27. "Autumn (Podzim)" /Emanuel Frynta/ C & K Vocal (3:17)
28. "Life is a Dog (Život je pes)" /Emanuel Frynta/ Petr Skoumal, C & K Vocal (2:16)
