= Bob a Bobek – králíci z klobouku =

Czech children's TV series

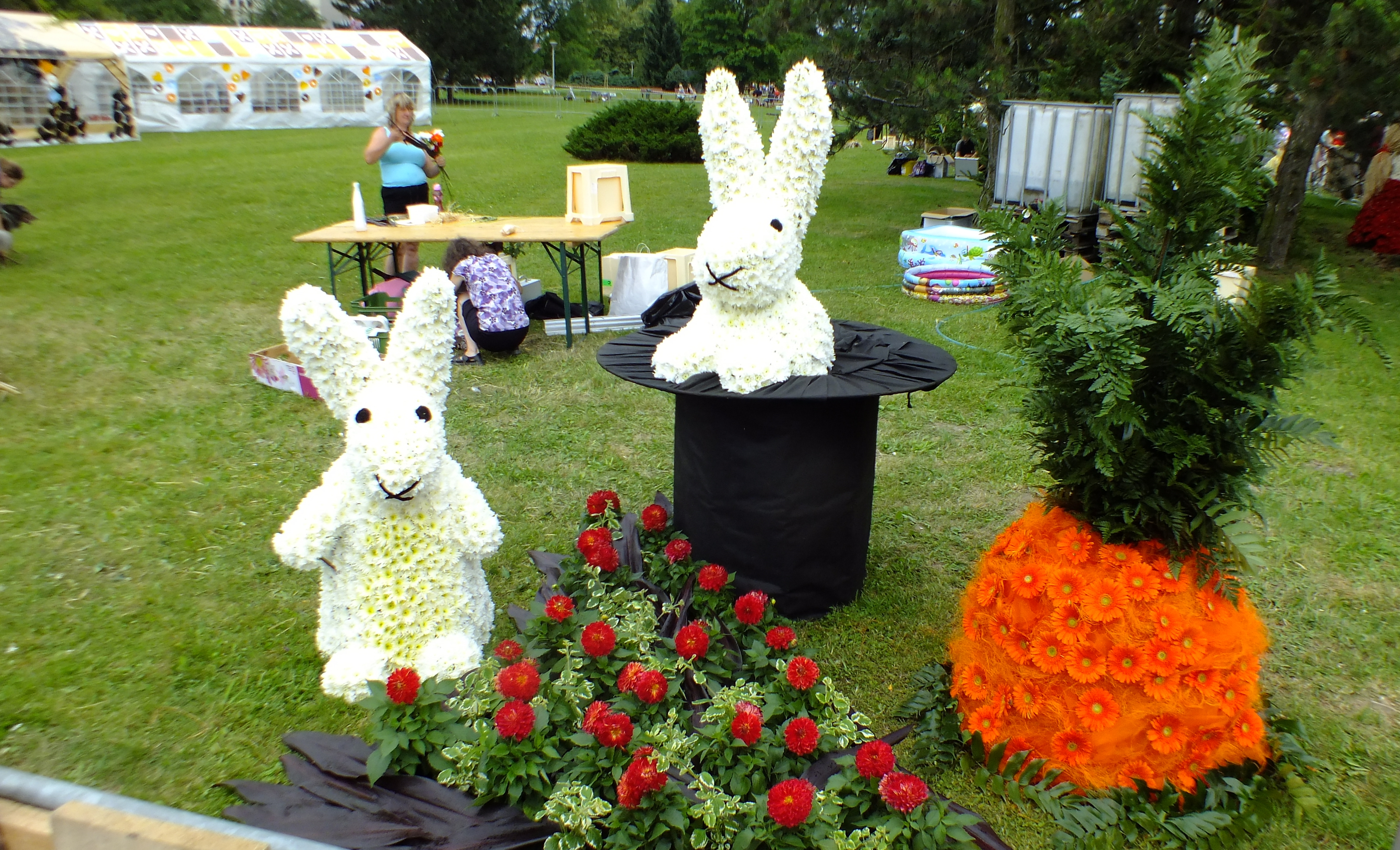
Bob and Bobek flower sculpture

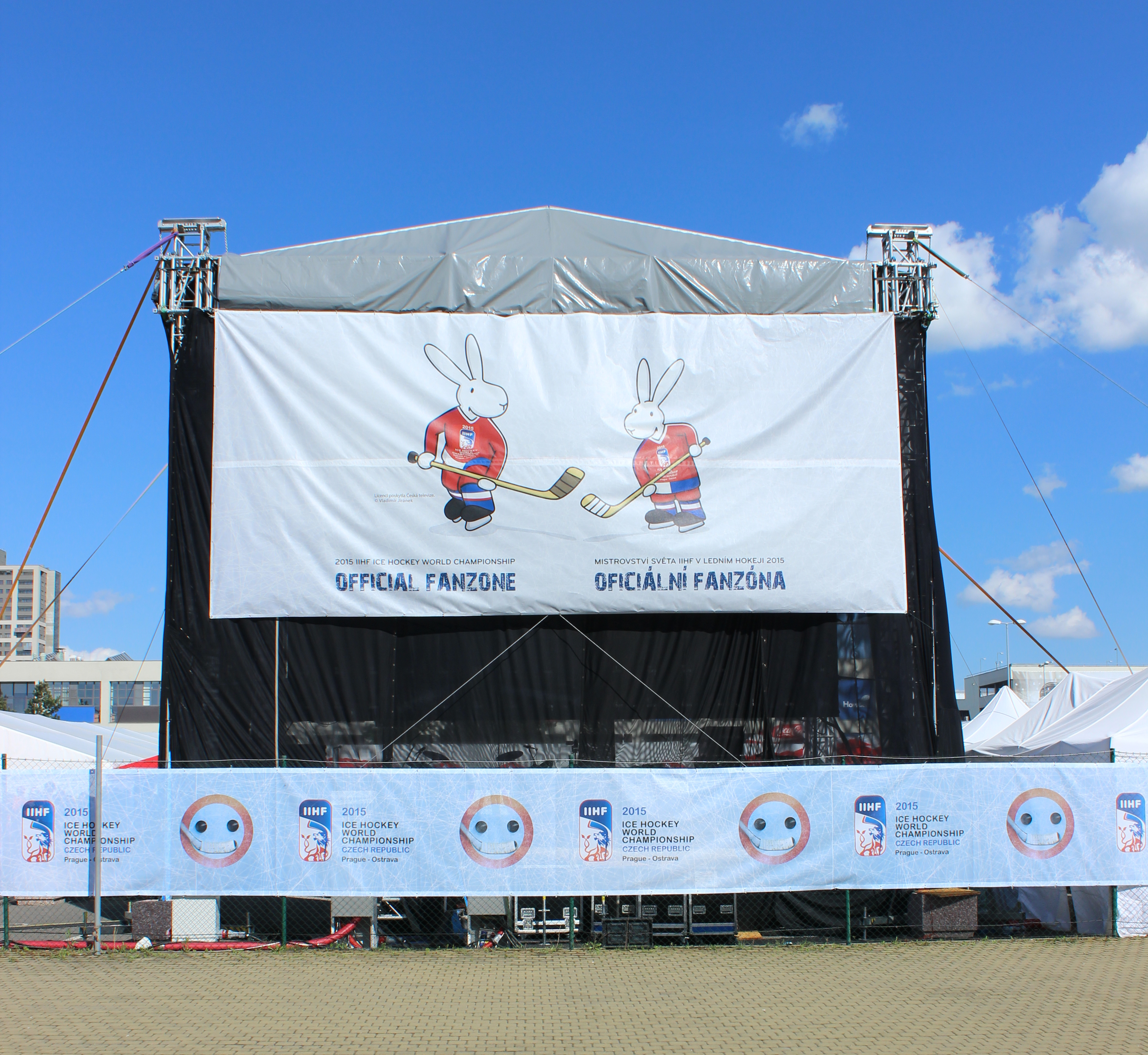
Poster for Bob a Bobek IIHF 2015

Bob a Bobek – králíci z klobouku (English: Bob and Bobek – the Rabbits from a Hat or Bob and Bobby – the Rabbits from a Hat) is a Czech cartoon series. It is one of the most popular series made for the children's television programme Večerníček.

Production began in 1978, and the series first appeared on Czechoslovak Television on 11 December 1979. It ran for 91 episodes and eight seasons between 1979 and 2005. Starting with the fourth season (2003), the show was renamed Bob a Bobek na cestách (English: Bob and Bobek on the road). A New Year's Eve special for adults, Bob a Bobek Grand šou, was also released in 1980.

The series was directed by Václav Bedřich, Miroslav Walter, and Ivo Hejcman. Art was done by Vladimír Jiránek, while writing was done by Jiránek, Jaroslav Pacovský, Jiří Šebánek and Pavel Šrut. Petr Skoumal composed the music and Josef Dvořák provided the voices.

== Synopsis ==
Bob and Bobek are two white rabbits who live in a hat owned by the (usually unseen) magician Pokustón. Bob is older and wiser while Bobek is younger and more carefree. Each episode traditionally begins with Bob pulling Bobek out of the hat and telling him "get up and exercise". Bobek then asks why, Bob says "because it is morning", and Bobek says "for me, it is still nighttime". The first three seasons are about the rabbits' adventures in their everyday life, which often involve them getting a new job or hobby. In the fourth to eighth seasons, the rabbits fly in their hat to overseas locations.

== Movie adaptation ==
A movie adaptation was released on 5 December 2024. The movie is called Bob & Bobek - On the Trail to Carrot Eater and is directed by Miroslav Zachariáš and Ondřej Pecha.

== In popular culture ==
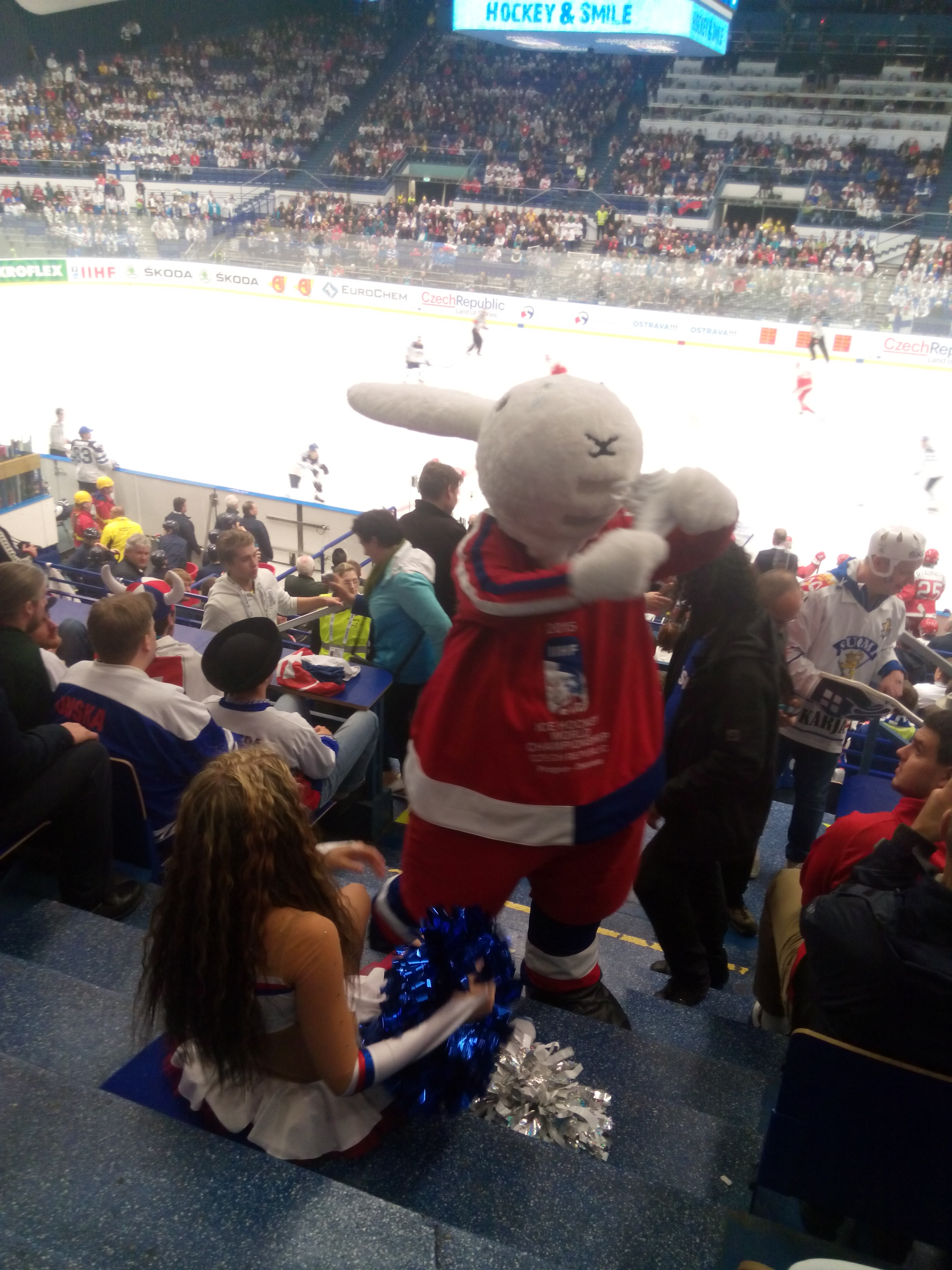
Bob or Bobek as a 2015 IIHF World Championship mascot

Bob and Bobek were the mascots for the 2015 and 2024 Ice Hockey World Championships, which were held in the Czech Republic.
