= Srdečný pozdrav ze zeměkoule =

- Directed by: Oldřich Lipský
- Written by: Vladimír Jiránek, Oldřich Lipský, Alexander Lukeš, Milan Lasica, Július Satinský
- Produced by: Zdeňka Deitchová (uncredited); Jiri Sebestik (uncredited); Jaromir Lukas
- Starring: Jiří Menzel; Jiří Lábus; Karel Augusta; Milos Kopecky; Vladimir Hruby; Vladimir Jiranek (illustration)
- Cinematography: Eva Kargerova; Zdena Hajdova; Jiri Macak
- Edited by: Gaia Vitkova (animation); Jirina Pecova (animation); Miroslav Hajek
- Music by: Petr Skoumal (live action); Jiří Kolafa (animation)
- Production companies: Bratři v triku Kratky Film Prague; Barrandov Studios
- Distributed by: Ústředni půjčovna filmu Praha
- Release date: 1982
- Running time: 98 min.
- Country: Czechoslovakia
- Language: Czech

Srdečný pozdrav ze zeměkoule (Best Regards from the Earth) is a 1982 Czechoslovak comedy science fiction film directed by Oldřich Lipský. This is the only live action film to be done in Kratky Film Praha under the Bratři v triku mark.
