= Lubomír Beneš =

Czech animator, director and author (1935–1995)

- Born: 7 November 1935; Prague, Czechoslovakia
- Died: 12 September 1995; Roztoky, Czech Republic
- Known for: Co-creator of Pat & Mat

Lubomír Beneš (7 November 1935 – 12 September 1995) was a Czech animator, director, and author, best known as the co-creator of Pat & Mat, an animated series about two highly inventive, yet incredibly clumsy handyman neighbours.

== Life and career ==
Lubomír Beneš grew up in Hloubětín, a suburb of Prague. As a child, he was artistically talented, so his parents paid for private art lessons, in which he studied drawing, painting and writing.

He began working in animation in the late 1950s in the animation studios of Krátký Film Praha. After winning a competition he was accepted to the animated film studio Bratři v triku after his military service, where he became acquainted with various animation techniques. He worked in SFX on the animated film like Gallina Vogelbirdae by Jiri Brdecka.

In 1967, he transferred from Bratři v triku to the Loutkovy Film Praha/Jiří Trnka Studio. There he created and directed his first film, Homo (Man) in 1969. Beneš’s first puppet film, Beg your pardon (Czech: Račte prominout), was made in 1974. He directed over a hundred short films, mostly puppet stop motion animation, and many of them for children. Some of his films also used cutout techniques.

During the 1970s and 1980s, Beneš worked on numerous TV projects for the state channels Československá televize (ČST) Praha and ČST Bratislava. His most popular animated series for ČST were ... a je to! (... and that's it!) (28 episodes, 1979–1985) and Jája a Pája (21 episodes, 1986, 1987, 1995).

From 1990, he worked in the aiF Studio, which he had founded together with his son Marek, Pat & Mat co-creator Vladimír Jiránek and producer Michal Podhradský. There, he produced and directed 14 new Pat & Mat episodes in 1992 and 1994, which were highly successful and broadcast internationally. The animated films made by aiF were also broadcast on BBC One. Beneš directed, produced and wrote animated films in his studio until his death in 1995. His studio declared bankruptcy four years later.

== Awards and prizes ==
His films won several prizes abroad and at home. The King and the Dwarf (Czech: Král a skřítek) won several prizes, including The Silver Carnation at the Sitges Film Festival, Silver in the Odesa International Film Festival, and the Silver Mikeldi in Bilbao. The Record Player (Czech: Gramofon) from ...A je to! won the Prize for the Best Film for Children at the 6th festival in Espinho, Portugal. Uneven Fight (Czech: Nerovný souboj) won the Main prize at the Vancouver Film Festival. With a Smile (Czech: S úsměvem) won the main prize, Golden Dancer, in Huesca.

The 38th Pat & Mat episode, The Cyclists (Czech: Cyklisti), animated by Alfons Mensdorff-Pouilly, participated in the "Annecy '93" (Annecy, France) animation festival competition, and was invited to a number of other international festivals. The Cyclists was also included in the selection "The Best of Annecy '93" by Cinémathèque Québécoise (Montreal), Museum of Fine Arts (Boston), Pacific Film Archive (Berkeley), Museum of Modern Art (New York City) and presented by these institutions in their autumn 1993 show.

The 44th Pat & Mat episode, The Billiards (Czech: Kulečník), animated by František Váša, was selected for the "Annecy '95" competition, and invited to many other international film festivals. The Billiards won two prizes at the World Animation Celebration in Agoura, California, in March 1997: 1st prize, Best Animation for a Daytime TV Series and 2nd prize, Best Stop Motion Professional Animation.

== Personal life ==
Beneš lived in Roztoky, near Prague. He was married to his wife Vera Smetanova-Benesova, and had a son and daughter. His son Marek is the current director of the Pat & Mat series.
