= Jiří Srnec =

Czech theatre director and artist (1931–2021)

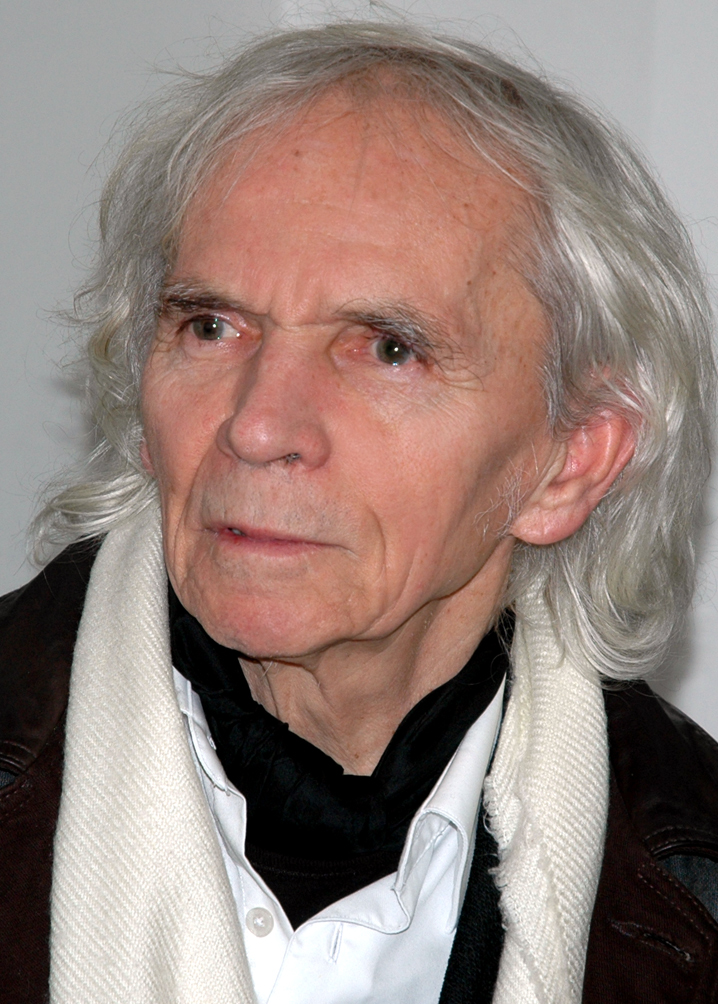
- Srnec in 2012
- Born: 29 August 1931; Žalov, Czechoslovakia
- Died: 28 November 2021 (aged 90)
- Occupations: Theatre director and artist

Jiří Srnec (29 August 1931 – 28 November 2021) was a Czech theatre director and artist. He was a recipient of the Medal of Merit of the Czech Repulic (2011).

Srnec died on 28 November 2021, at the age of 90.
