= Roztoky =

Town in Central Bohemian Region, Czech Republic

- Town
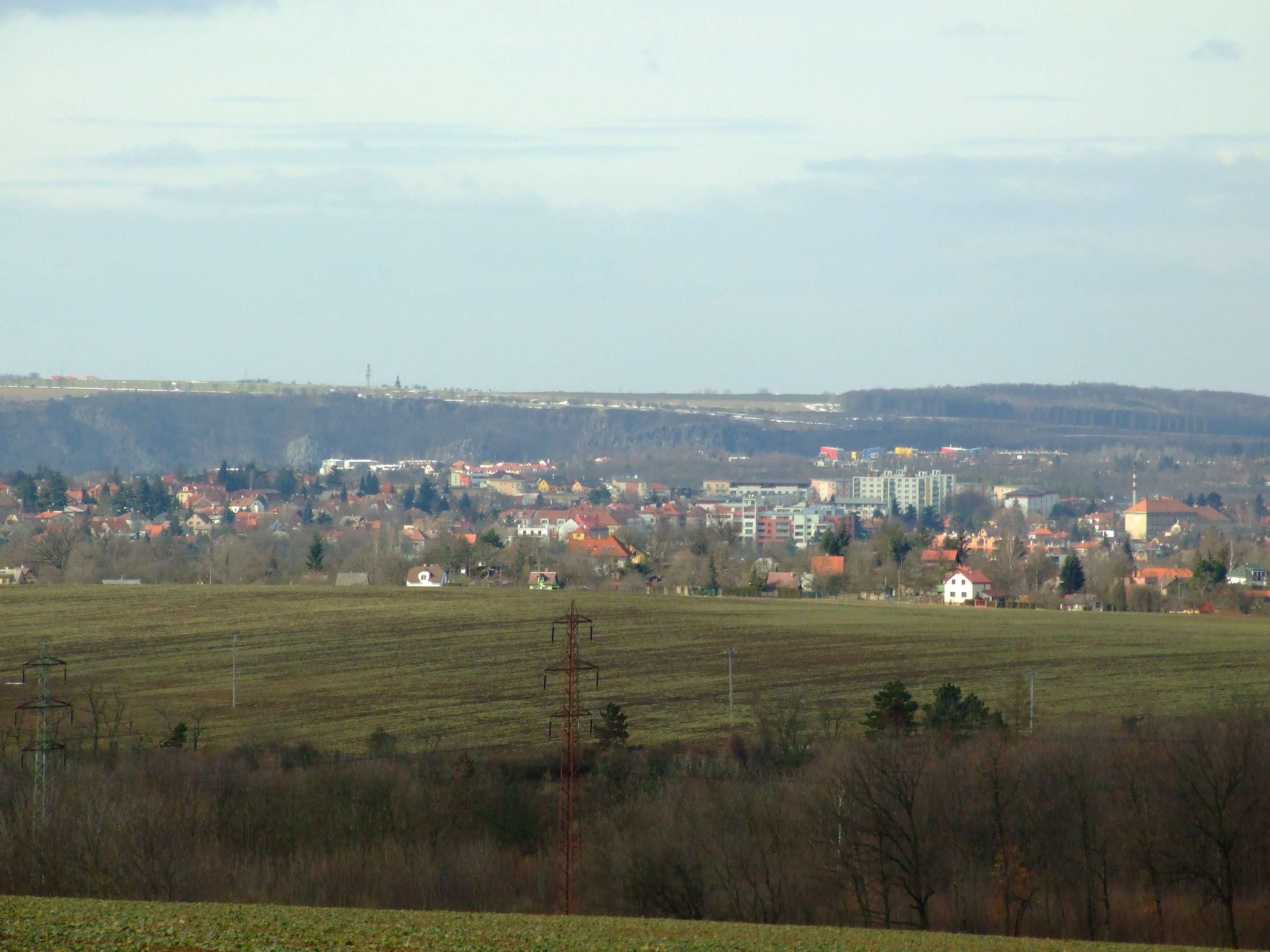
- Roztoky seen from Prague-Čimice

- Flag Coat of arms

- Location in the Czech Republic
- Coordinates: 50°9′41″N 14°23′13″E
- Country: Czech Republic
- Region: Central Bohemian
- District: Prague-West
- First mentioned: 1233

Government
  - Mayor: Marie Dvořáková

Area
  - Total: 8.13 km^{2} (3.14 sq mi)
- Elevation: 237 m (778 ft)

Population (2026-01-01)
  - Total: 9,147
  - Density: 1,130/km^{2} (2,910/sq mi)
- Time zone: UTC+1 (CET)
  - Summer (DST): UTC+2 (CEST)
- Postal code: 252 63
- Website: www.roztoky.cz

Roztoky (Czech pronunciation: [ˈrostokɪ]; German: Rostok) is a town in Prague-West District in the Central Bohemian Region of the Czech Republic. It has about 9,100 inhabitants. The town is located on the Vltava River in the Prague Plateau. Roztoky is known for the Levý Hradec site with the remains of a Slavic gord, which is protected as a national cultural monument.

== Etymology ==
The name is derived from rozdělený tok, i.e. 'divided stream'. It is a common Czech geographical name for places founded at the confluence of a small stream with a river.

== Geography ==
Roztoky is located north of Prague, in its immediate vicinity. It lies in the Prague Plateau. The highest point is at 310 m (1,017 ft) above sea level. The town is situated on the left bank of the Vltava River, in its meander.

== History ==
According to archaeological findings, the area of Roztoky was inhabited continuously from the early Stone Age to the early Middle Ages. The first written mention of Roztoky is found in the ruling charter from 1233, in which Peter of Roztoky is named.

From 1870 to 1952, a globe manufacturing industry founded by Jan Felkl was located in Roztoky.

== Demographics ==
Historical population

| Year | Pop. | ±% |
|---|---|---|
| 1869 | 1,148 | — |
| 1880 | 1,213 | +5.7% |
| 1890 | 1,367 | +12.7% |
| 1900 | 1,575 | +15.2% |
| 1910 | 1,941 | +23.2% |

| Year | Pop. | ±% |
|---|---|---|
| 1921 | 2,609 | +34.4% |
| 1930 | 4,769 | +82.8% |
| 1950 | 5,272 | +10.5% |
| 1961 | 5,905 | +12.0% |
| 1970 | 6,146 | +4.1% |

| Year | Pop. | ±% |
|---|---|---|
| 1980 | 6,138 | −0.1% |
| 1991 | 5,756 | −6.2% |
| 2001 | 5,733 | −0.4% |
| 2011 | 8,140 | +42.0% |
| 2021 | 9,216 | +13.2% |

Source: Censuses

== Transport ==
Roztoky is located on the railway line Prague–Ústí nad Labem via Kralupy nad Vltavou.

== Sights ==
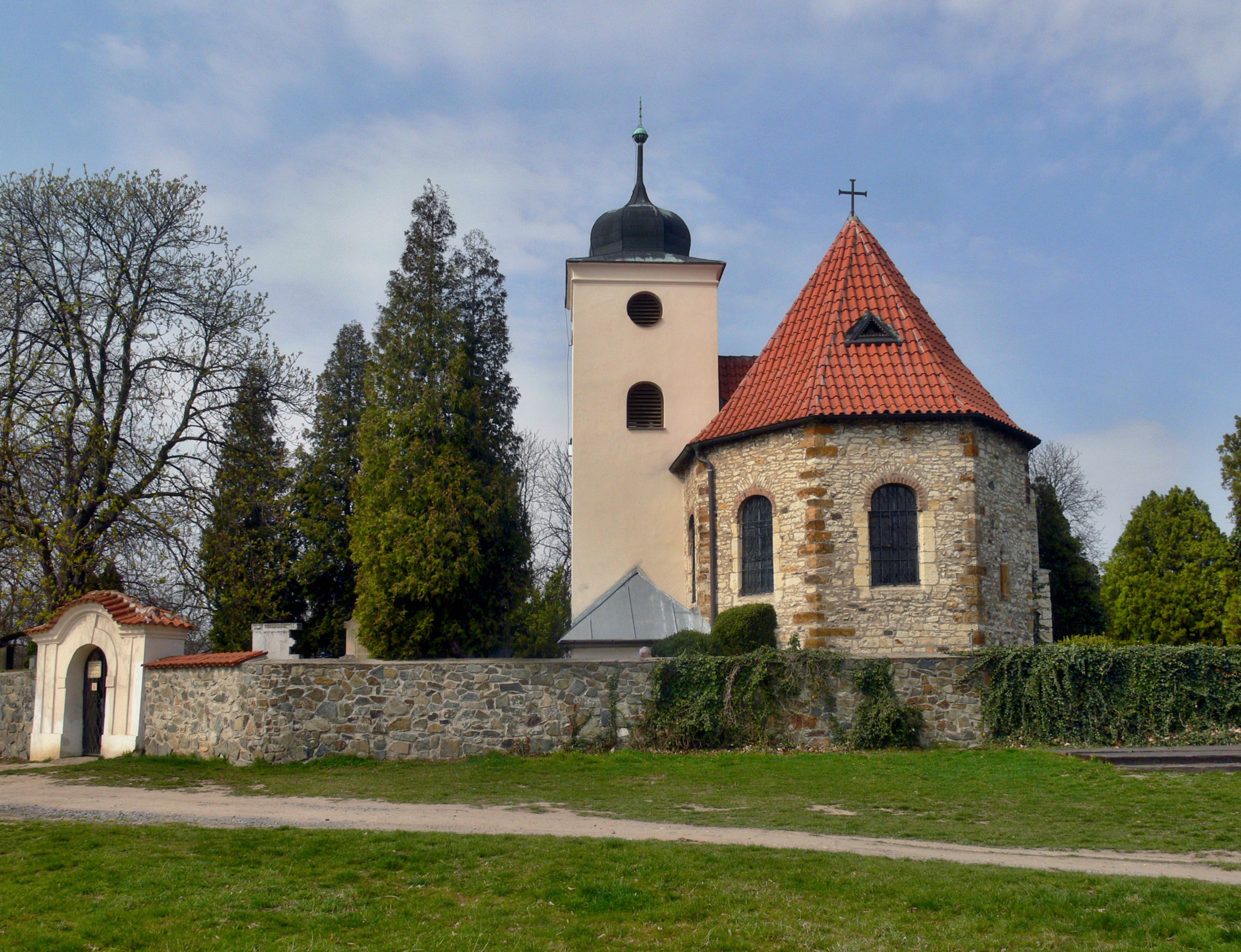
Church of Saint Clement

Levý Hradec is a locality in Roztoky with remains of a Slavic gord founded by the Přemyslid dynasty. In the 980s, Duke Bořivoj I had the first Christian church in Bohemia built here, dedicated to Saint Clement. The church is preserved, but has been rebuilt and expanded many times, and only the foundations of the rotunda under the floor are preserved from the original church. The site is protected as a national cultural monument.

== Notable people ==
- Zdenka Braunerová (1858–1934), painter and graphic designer
- Emil Utitz (1883–1956), philosopher and psychologist
- Jiří Srnec (1931–2021), theatre director and artist
- Lubomír Beneš (1935–1995), animator, director and author; lived and died here
- Martin Myšička (born 1970), actor; lives here
- Gabriela Jílková (born 1995), racing driver

== Twin towns – sister cities ==
Roztoky is twinned with:

- Skawina, Poland
