= Jan Felkl =

Czech globe maker and industrialist

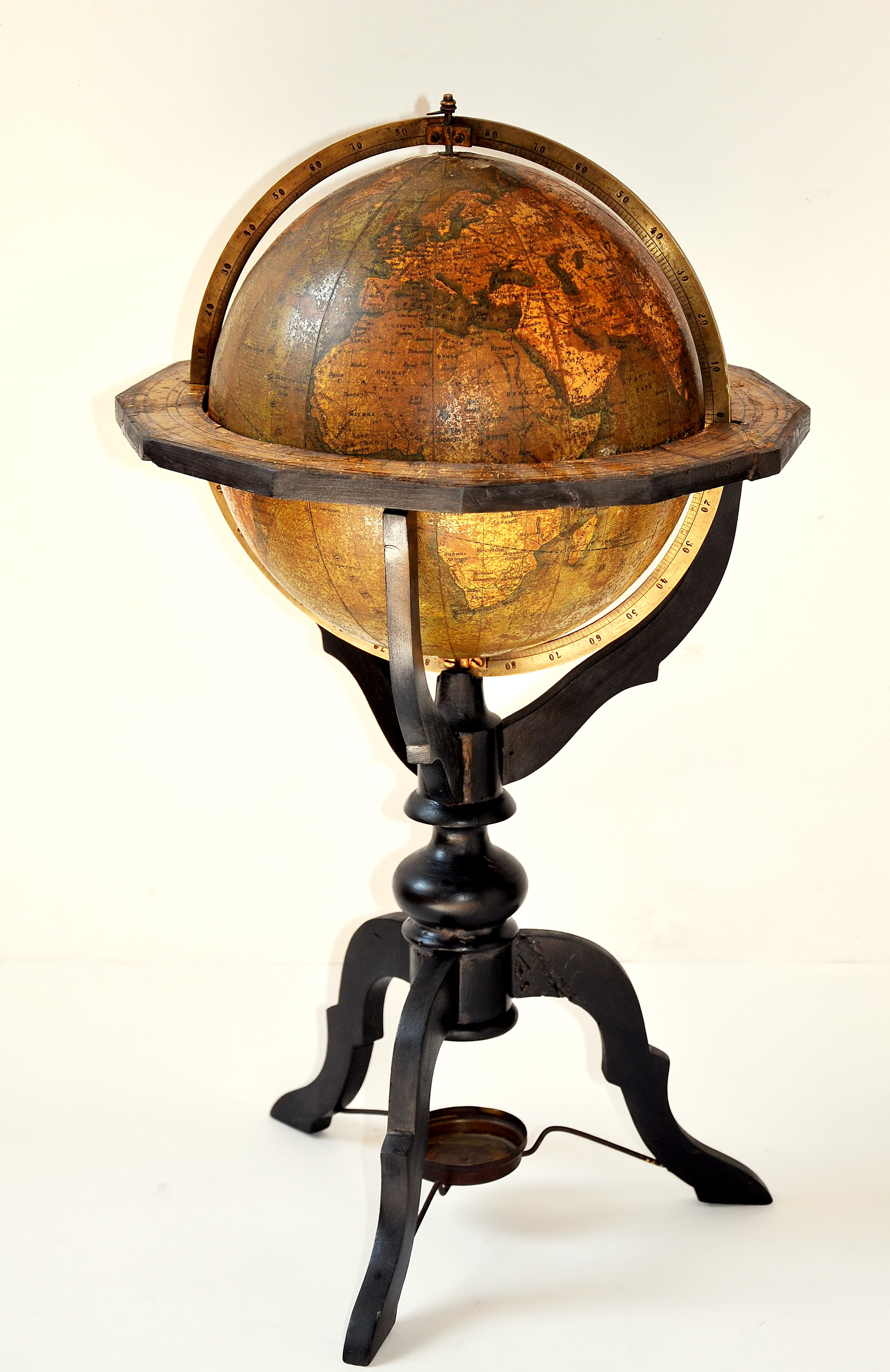
Globe by the firm of Jan Felkl dated 1875, from the Museum of Science and Technology, Belgrade (Serbia)

Jan Felkl (20 May 1817 – 7 October 1887) was a Czech globe maker and industrialist. He came from Banín, but settled in Prague where he got to know cartographer and globe maker Václav Merklas. Merklas soon after gifted his tools to Felkl, who set up his own workshop in the Old Town of Prague in the early 1850s.

Felkl's company grew rapidly and was eventually to become the most important and internationally most well-known globe manufacturing firm of Austria-Hungary. In 1870 the factory for the manufacturing of Felkl's globes relocated from Prague to the nearby town of Roztoky. By 1873 it produced 15,000 globes annually and, by 1877, in 17 languages. After Jan Felkl's death, the company continued to produce globes until 1952, when it closed due to setbacks suffered from market loss after the dissolution of Austria-Hungary, legal conflicts, World War II, the installation of the Communist regime, and not least stiffening competition.

== Early life ==
Jan Felkl was born on 20 May 1817 in Banín, in what is today the Czech Republic but was then the Austrian Empire. He was the son of an ethnic German farmer. His interest in globe making was supposedly born when he was a conscripted soldier in the Imperial Austrian Army, and had a superior whose hobby was globe making. With the military he came to Prague, where he after his discharge found a job working for the postal service and settled in Hradčany. In Prague he got to know cartographer Václav Merklas, who had made the first Czech-language globe in 1848. Merklas soon thereafter took up a teaching position and abandoned further attempts at globe making, and therefore gifted his tools to Felkl in 1849. Felkl moved to the Old Town in 1850 and only began producing his own globes sometimes after this. They were initially copies of Merklas' models with diameters of 2.5 inches (6.4 cm), 3.5 inches (8.9 cm) and 4.5 inches (11 cm), respectively. Two friends from his military days helped Felkl set up his workshop. He formally founded a globe making company in 1854.

== Globe manufacturing ==
The business grew rapidly. In 1855, the firm produced 800 globes annually; by 1873 it had expanded to 15,000 globes annually. Felkl employed a simple manufacturing technique, whereby plaster globes were moulded in brass moulds, onto which printed and initially hand-painted paper slips were attached. Later, some globes would also be made of cardboard. With the introduction of colouring by lithography, as opposed to by hand, production costs went down further. The printing was done in Prague but from the outset also in Leipzig. With the rapid growth of the company, in 1870 the factory for the manufacturing of Felkl's globes relocated from Prague to the nearby town of Roztoky. At that time, the company employed around 24 people. Felkl also set up his own lithographic printing office in Prague c. 1873. In the same year, at the 1873 Vienna World's Fair, Felk's globes were awarded the first prize, and the next year one of the German-language versions of the globes was approved for use in primary and secondary schools in Austria-Hungary. This was followed by an approval in 1879 to use a Czech-language version in Czech-language schools. Felkl's son entered the company in 1875 as his father's business partner, whereafter the firm was known as "Felkl & Son". The firm had its heyday in the 1890s. At its peak, it was the most important and internationally most well-known globe manufacturing firm of Austria-Hungary. It dominated the domestic market and exported thousands of globes.

Though his first globe models were with text in Czech, early on he began printing and manufacturing globes in German, which opened a larger market. Felkl thereafter soon expanded to producing globes in other languages as well, using translations from the German-language globes. By 1861 Felkl produced globes in English, Dutch, Hungarian, Polish and Russian. By 1877, Felkl's company offered globes in 17 different languages.

Already in 1855, Felkl also produced a celestial globe, which he had developed with the aid of the director of the Prague observatory, Joseph Böhm. Felkl also cooperated with others in producing his terrestrial globes, including German geographer Otto Delitsch (who aided Felkl in designing a relief globe) and Czech statistician Josef Erben, who collaborated with Felkl on finding the right terminology for the Czech globes. Apart from globes, the company also produced a range of other instruments such as telluria and orreries.

Jan Felkl married Maria Anna Jakob and the couple had nine children. He died on 7 October 1887. After his death, the company continued to operate and remained a family business. Production stood still between the advent of World War I in 1914 and 1921. The dissolution of Austria-Hungary after the war meant that the domestic market vanished. The company had a second period of success after 1924, when it pioneered selling illuminated globes. However, legal conflicts, World War II, the installation of the Communist regime, and not least stiffening competition led to its decline. The company formally closed in 1952.
