= Pat & Mat =

Czechoslovak stop-motion animated series

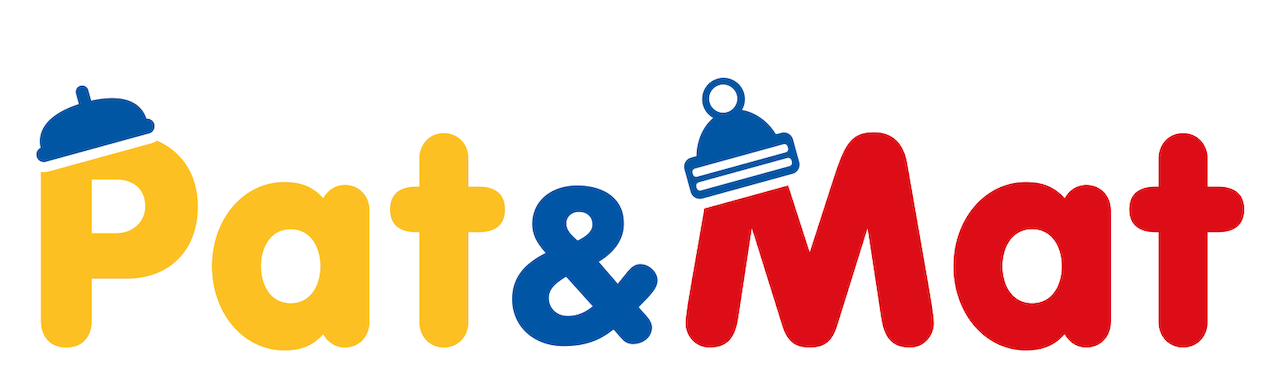
- Pat and Mat logo (in VAG Rounded)
- Genre: Comedy; Slapstick
- Created by: Lubomír Beneš; Vladimír Jiránek
- Written by: Lubomír Beneš; Vladimír Jiránek; Jiří Kubíček; Vendulka Čvančarová; Marek Beneš others
- Directed by: Lubomír Beneš; Marek Beneš others
- Theme music composer: Petr Skoumal
- Composers: Luboš Fišer (ep. 1); Petr Skoumal (ep. 2–91); Zdeněk Zdeněk (ep. 92–130)
- Countries of origin: Czechoslovakia; Czech Republic
- Original language: None (Note: The original episodes have no spoken dialogue with the exception of ep. 50, which has English voice acting. In certain foreign markets, notably the Netherlands, spoken dialogue is added.)
- No. of episodes: 130

Production
- Running time: 6–9 min.
- Production companies: Krátký film Praha aiF Studio; Patmat film Ateliéry Bonton Zlín others

Original release
- Network: ČST (1979–1992); ČT (1992–2020); STV (1993–2011); ČT :D (2013–2020); TV JOJ (2016)
- Release: 12 August 1976 – 2020

Pat & Mat (Czech and Slovak: Pat a Mat) is a Czech silent stop-motion animated comedy series created by Lubomír Beneš and Vladimír Jiránek. The characters first appeared in the theatrically released short Kuťáci (Tinkers) in 1976, while the first made-for-TV episode "Tapety" ("Wallpaper") was produced for ČST Bratislava three years later.

The main characters of the series are two inventive yet clumsy handymen named Pat and Mat who end up facing various mishaps while on the job. As of 2026, 130 episodes of the show have been released, and it has been syndicated in a large number of countries due to its lack of dialogue (except in some markets such as the Dutch version, which is dubbed).

== History ==
=== Names ===
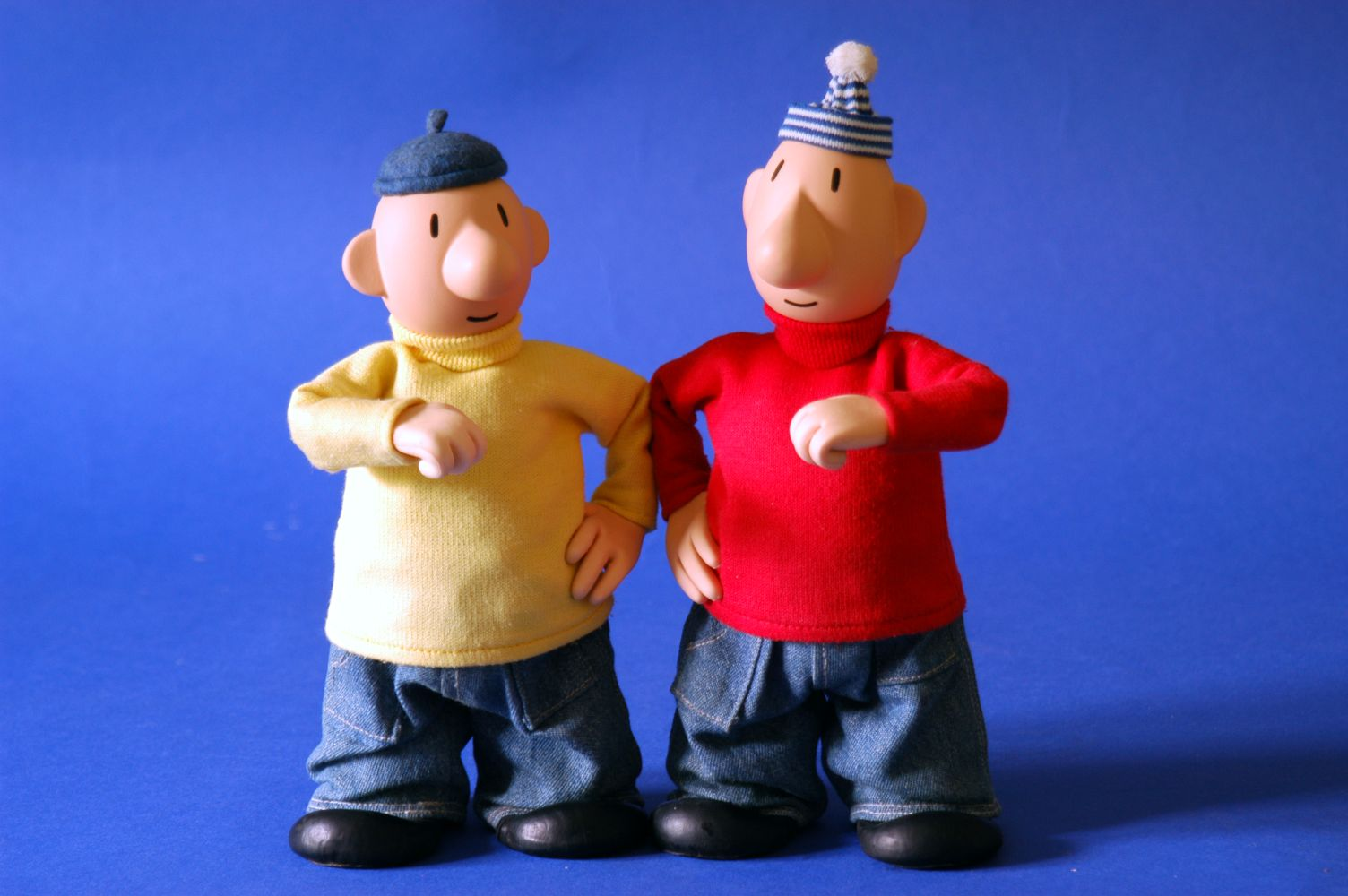
Pat (left) and Mat (right)

The original name of the series was Kuťáci (The Tinkers), but when production of episodes started for ČST Bratislava, a Slovak name was required, and the crew eventually settled for ... a je to! (... and it's done!). The characters themselves were nameless until 1989, when they were given the names Pat and Mat. "Pat" and "mat" are the Czech and Slovak terms for stalemate and checkmate respectively, but despite popular belief, this is not where Pat and Mat's names come from; they are shortened forms of Czech expressions "patlal" and "matlal", which can roughly be translated as "clumsy" and "awkward". The authors intentionally gave the characters short and universal names suitable for a worldwide audience.

=== Premise ===
According to the authors, it is manual ineptitude that inspires the stories. Alongside the humour, another motif of the show is the importance of an optimistic approach towards life. The two characters always get into problematic situations, but they never give up until they solve the problem in imaginative ways. Pat and Mat typically find a solution in the end, usually via a surprising or innovative method, after which they shake hands, before making their trademark hand gesture with a bent hand and closed fist.

=== Struggles ===
Although the authors wanted to continue shooting after the initial short, their studio Krátký film did not allow them to do so. The reason given was that Kuťáci were just ordinary entertainment not appropriate for the cultural policy of the time, but as the Slovak Television in Bratislava showed interest in further episodes, twenty-eight episodes were produced for them instead, with great success.

=== Further productions ===
The characters were revived in 2009 by Beneš for a new series, Pat a Mat na venkově (Pat & Mat in the Country). The pilot, "Postele" ("Beds"), premiered at the 50th Zlín Film Festival in 2010. 12 more episodes followed between 2011 and 2015, produced by Patmat Film and filmed in 16:9. Beneš directed and wrote all 13 episodes. Eight of the episodes were released on DVD in 2013 and received their TV premiere on the Dutch channel VPRO on 9 June of the same year, with the rest following soon.

To celebrate the show's 40th anniversary, Gusto Entertainment produced a full-length feature film released in cinemas in 2016. The film, Pat a Mat ve filmu (Pat & Mat in a Movie), featured ten of the 2009–2015 episodes with linking segments and was shown in cinemas in several countries, including the Netherlands.

From 2018 until 2020, 39 new episodes divided into three 13-part series were made in Patmat film, co-produced by Czech Television and Netherlands-based JUST Productions, again directed by Beneš. The animation for more than half of these episodes was produced in a Chinese studio to speed up work. New episodes for Pat a Mat na venkově series were announced by Czech Television since 2021.

=== "Playing Cards" ===
After Lubomír Beneš died in 1995, the studio produced a new episode titled Playing Cards (Karty in Czech) and initially planned to make further episodes of this new series, with the possibility of half-hour episodes and a feature film in the future. Unlike the previous silent episodes, the new episode had English voice acting, with David Nykl as the voice of Pat and Peter Alton as the voice of Mat. Due to various circumstances, Playing Cards was never released or distributed in the Czech Republic and most of the world, even though it entered competition at Annecy in 1999.

Although the episode was pulled from distribution, a screenshot from it was posted on aiF Studio's website. The former Prague management later set up a new studio at the same location, Animation People, and posted more screenshots on their website, which were eventually replaced with a short, silent clip of the episode. In 2025 the episode was finally uploaded on the official Pat a Mat YouTube channel.

== Production years ==
Nr.	Episode(s)	Production year
1	1 (1)	1976
2	2–29 (28)	1979, 1981–1985
3	30–35 (6)	1989–1990
4	36–49 (14)	1992, 1994
5	50 (1, unreleased until 2025)	1997–1998
6	51–78 (28)	2002–2004
7	79–91 (13)	2009, 2011–2015
8	92–104 (13)	2018
9	105–117 (13)	2018–2019
10	118–130 (13)	2019–2020

== List of episodes ==
N°	Year of production	English title	Czech title (Slovak in 1979–1985)	Episode director
Kuťáci (Tinkers) produced in the Barrandov animation studios (Krátký Film), Prague
1	1976	Tinkers	Kuťáci	Lubomír Beneš
... a je to! produced in the Barrandov animation studios (Krátký Film), Prague for Czechoslovak Television, Bratislava
2	1979	Tapestry (Wallpaper)	Tapety	Lubomír Beneš
3	1979	Workshop	Dielňa	Lubomír Beneš
4	1979	Carpet	Koberec	Lubomír Beneš
5	1979	Rocking Chair	Hojdacie kreslo	Lubomír Beneš
6	1979	Picture	Obraz	Lubomír Beneš
7	1979	Garage	Garáž	Lubomír Beneš
8	1979	Light (The Light)	Svetlo	Lubomír Beneš
9	1981	Record Player (Gramophone)	Gramofón	Lubomír Beneš
10	1981	Grill	Grill	Lubomír Beneš
11	1982	Removal (Moving Day)	Sťahovanie	Lubomír Beneš
12	1982	Water	Voda	Lubomír Beneš
13	1982	Garden	Záhradka	Lubomír Beneš
14	1982	Painting Job	Maľovanie	Lubomír Beneš
15	1982	Jumpers	Skokani	Lubomír Beneš
16	1982	Crossword (Crossword Puzzle)	Krížovka	Lubomír Beneš
17	1983	Bird Feeder (Birdhouse)	Búdka	Lubomír Beneš
18	1983	Big Laundry (Laundry Day)	Veľké pranie	Lubomír Beneš
19	1983	Gym	Telocvičňa	Lubomír Beneš
20	1983	Breakfast (Breakfast in Grass)	Raňajky v tráve	Lubomír Beneš
21	1983	Washing Machine	Práčka	Lubomír Beneš
22	1983	Rain	Dážď	Lubomír Beneš
23	1984	Excursion (Trip)	Výlet	Lubomír Beneš
24	1984	Winegrowers (Winemakers)	Vinári	Lubomír Beneš
25	1984	Skates	Korčule	Lubomír Beneš
26	1984	Piano	Klavír	Lubomír Beneš
27	1985	Potters	Hrnčiari	Lubomír Beneš
28	1985	Defect (Malfunction)	Porucha	Lubomír Beneš
29	1985	Apple	Jablko	Lubomír Beneš
Pat & Mat produced in the Barrandov animation studios (Krátký Film), Prague
30	1989	Key (The Key)	Klíč	Lubomír Beneš
31	1989	Furniture	Nábytek	Lubomír Beneš
32	1990	Mowing Machine (Lawnmower)	Sekačka	Lubomír Beneš
33	1990	Big Cleanup	Generální úklid	Lubomír Beneš
34	1990	Roof	Střecha	Lubomír Beneš
35	1990	Door	Dveře	Lubomír Beneš
Pat & Mat produced in the authors' aiF Studio, Prague
36	1992	Biscuits	Sušenky	Marek Beneš
37	1992	Garage Door	Vrata	Lubomír Beneš
38	1992	Cyclists	Cyklisti	Lubomír Beneš
39	1992	Paving Bricks (Tiles)	Dlaždice	Lubomír Beneš
40	1992	Parquetry (Parquet)	Parkety	Lubomír Beneš
41	1992	Gutter Pipe	Okap	Marek Beneš
42	1992	Convertible	Kabriolet	Lubomír Beneš
43	1994	Flat Tire (Accident)	Nehoda	Lubomír Beneš
44	1994	Billiards	Kulečník	Lubomír Beneš
45	1994	Quickset Hedge (Hedgerow)	Živý plot	Lubomír Beneš
46	1994	Safe (The Safe)	Trezor	Lubomír Beneš
47	1994	Mudguard (Fender)	Blatník	Lubomír Beneš
48	1994	Model Builders	Modeláři	Lubomír Beneš
49	1994	Windsurfing	Windsurfing	Lubomír Beneš
episode not released for distribution
50	1997–1998	Playing Cards	Karty	František Váša
Pat a Mat, Pat a Mat se vracejí (Pat & Mat Return) (followers, with Marek Beneš or his consent) produced by Ateliery Bonton Zlín
51	2002	Puzzle	Puzzle	Marek Beneš
52	2003	Roasted Sausages	Opékají špekáčky	Ladislav Pálka
53	2003	Roof Repair	Opravují střechu	Ladislav Pálka
54	2003	Black Box	Černá bedýnka	Vlasta Pospíšilová
55	2003	Furniture on Wheels	Kolečka	Vlasta Pospíšilová
56	2003	Dog House	Psí bouda	Milan Šebesta
57	2003	Lacquering the Floor	Natírají podlahu	Ladislav Pálka
58	2003	The Greenhouse	Skleník	Marek Beneš
59	2003	The Swing	Houpačka	Marek Beneš
60	2003	Unwanted Guest	Nezvaný návštěvník	Marek Beneš
61	2003	Bodyguards	Bodygárdi	Marek Beneš
62	2003	Painting the Windows	Natírají okna	Marek Beneš
63	2003	Easter Egg	Velikonoční vajíčko	Vlasta Pospíšilová
64	2003	Slim Figure	Štíhlá linie	Vlasta Pospíšilová
65	2003	Vending Machine	Automat	Marek Beneš
66	2003	Autodrome	Autodráha	Marek Beneš
67	2003	Aquarium	Akvárium	Marek Beneš
68	2003	Canning	Zavařují	Ladislav Pálka
69	2003	Hang Glider	Rogalo	Ladislav Pálka
70	2003	Christmas Cake	Vánočka	Milan Šebesta
71	2003	Flu	Stůňou	Ladislav Pálka
72	2003	Fax Machine	Fax	Josef Lamka
73	2003	Strawberries	Truskawki	Vlasta Pospíšilová
74	2004	Playing Golf	Hrají golf	Ladislav Pálka
75	2004	Bottle Cap	Někam to zapadlo	Vlasta Pospíšilová
76	2004	Swimming Pool	Kopají bazén	Marek Beneš
77	2004	Hanging a Painting	Věší krajinu	Marek Beneš
78	2004	Christmas Tree	Vánoční stromeček	Marek Beneš
Pat a Mat na venkově (Pat & Mat in the Countryside) produced by Patmat film, Prague
79	2009	Beds	Postele	Marek Beneš
80	2011	Water Supply	Vodovod	Marek Beneš
81	2011	Paper Plates	Papírový servis	Marek Beneš
82	2011	Projector	Promítačka	Marek Beneš
83	2012	Vacuum Cleaner	Vysavač	Marek Beneš
84	2012	The Pool	Bazén	Marek Beneš
85	2012	The Floor	Podlaha	Marek Beneš
86	2013	Deadwood	Suchý strom	Marek Beneš
87	2014	Orange Juice	Pomerančová šťáva	Marek Beneš
88	2014	Bicycle	Rotoped	Marek Beneš
89	2015	Cactus	Kaktus	Marek Beneš
90	2015	Bathroom Tiles	Obkladačky	Marek Beneš
91	2015	Sun Cover	Sluneční clona	Marek Beneš
Pat a Mat nás baví (Pat & Mat Entertain Us) produced by Patmat film, Prague
92	2018	Bees	Včely	Marek Beneš
93	2018	(Solar) Lawnmower	Sekačka	Marek Beneš
94	2018	Mole	Krtek	Marek Beneš
95	2018	Fence	Plot	Marek Beneš
96	2018	Clogged Chimney	Ucpaný komín	Marek Beneš
97	2018	Power Station	Elektrárna	Marek Beneš
98	2018	Rock Garden	Skalka	Marek Beneš
99	2018	Rodeo	Rodeo	Marek Beneš
100	2018	Carousel	Kolotoč	Marek Beneš
101	2018	Dishwasher	Myčka	Marek Beneš
102	2018	Waste	Odpad	Marek Beneš
103	2018	Stairs	Schody	Marek Beneš
104	2018	Camera	Kamera	Marek Beneš
Pat a Mat – Zimní radovánky/Pat a Mat v zimě (Pat & Mat – Winter Fun/Pat & Mat in Winter) produced by Patmat film, Prague
105	2018	Calamity	Kalamita	Marek Beneš
106	2018	Christmas Lights	Vánoční světýlka	Marek Beneš
107	2018	Sauna	Sauna	Marek Beneš
108	2018	Nativity Scene	Betlém	Marek Beneš
109	2018	Tree	Stromeček	Marek Beneš
110	2018	Gifts	Dárky	Marek Beneš
111	2018	New Year	Silvestr	Marek Beneš
112	2019	Christmas Card	Novoroční přání	Marek Beneš
113	2019	Potato Salad	Bramborový salát	Marek Beneš
114	2019	Carp	Kapr	Marek Beneš
115	2019	Gingerbread House	Perníková chaloupka	Marek Beneš
116	2019	Glazed Frost	Ledovka	Marek Beneš
117	2019	Igloo	Iglú	Marek Beneš
Pat a Mat kutí (Pat & Mat Handymen's Adventures/DIY Troubles) produced by Patmat film, Prague
118	2019	Pancakes	Palačinky	Marek Beneš
119	2019	Flying Machine	Létající stroj	Marek Beneš
120	2019	Popcorn	Popcorn	Marek Beneš
121	2019	New Kitchen / Furniture	Nová kuchyně (Note: In Czech TV airings.) / Nábytek	Marek Beneš
122	2019	Car Wash	Automyčka	Marek Beneš
123	2019	Harvest	Sklizeň	Marek Beneš
124	2019	Phototrap	Fotopast	Marek Beneš
125	2020	Ice Making	Výroba ledu	Marek Beneš
126	2020	Tube Post	Potrubní pošta	Marek Beneš
127	2020	Barbecue	Barbecue	Marek Beneš
128	2020	Pizza	Pizza	Marek Beneš
129	2020	Bread	Pečou chleba	Marek Beneš
130	2020	Garage Door	Garážová vrata	Marek Beneš

== Feature films ==
Year	Czech title	English title
2016	Pat a Mat ve filmu	Pat & Mat in a Movie
2018	Pat a Mat znovu v akci	Pat & Mat in Action Again
2018	Pat a Mat: Zimní radovánky	Pat & Mat: Winter Fun
2019	Pat a Mat: Kutilské trampoty	Pat & Mat: Handymen's Adventures

== Broadcast ==
=== Fox Kids airings ===
In 2003 Fox Kids Europe bought the rights from Ateliéry Bonton Zlín to air episodes 2–26.

Country	TV channel(s)	Year(s)
Czech Republic	ČST, ČT, ČT :D, Fox Kids	1979–1992, 1992–present, 2013–present
Slovakia	ČST, Jednotka, Dvojka, TV JOJ	1979–1992, 1993–2010, 2016
Netherlands	NCRV, VPRO	1982, 1984–present

== Home media ==
Shorts from the AIF era were initially unavailable due to copyright issues, but appeared on DVD for the first time in 2007.

== Related products ==
At least two books with the series' characters have been published:

- Michl, Jiří (1994). Pat & Mat: ...and that's it!. Czech Republic: Egmont.
- Sýkora, Pavel; Jiránek, Vladimír; Beneš, Lubomír (2010). Pat a Mat dokážou všechno [Pat and Mat can do anything] (3rd ed.). Albatros. ISBN 9788000025933.

A Czech computer development company, Centauri Production released the Pat & Mat mini video game. It was released in Czech language in the Czech Republic on 1 October 2009, and in other EU countries in English in 2010. The English version from Steam was taken down in July 2020.

There is a wide range of Pat & Mat merchandise available, including games, dolls, key rings, office material, posters and T-shirts.
