= Galina Miklínová =

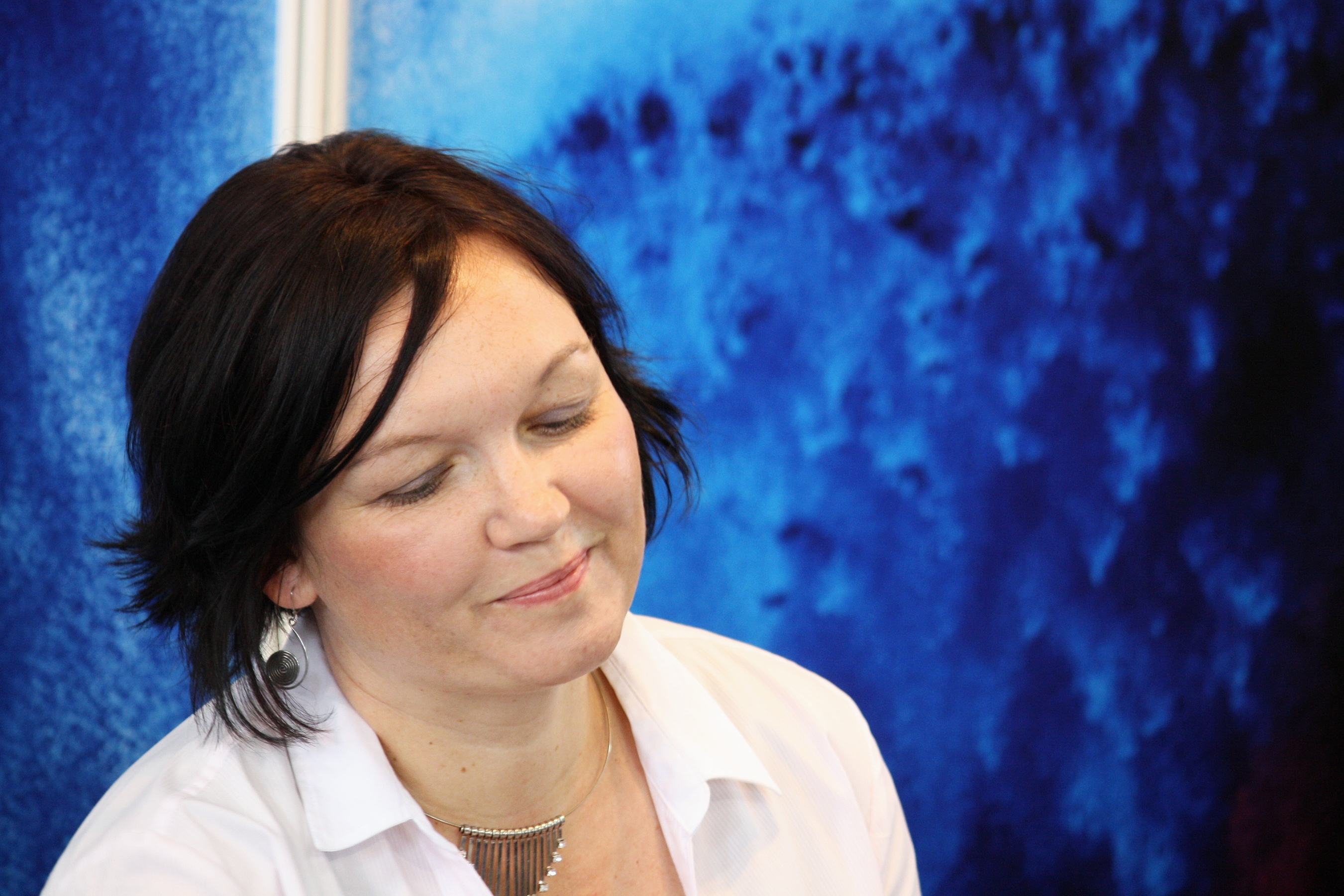
Galina Miklínová

Galina Miklínová (28 July 1970) is a Czech illustrator and director of cartoons.

== Career ==
She graduated from UMPRUM in Prague in 1997. She also studied at the University of Humberside in the United Kingdom.

She won many awards as both an author of cartoons and an illustrator of books. She often works with Czech poet, Pavel Šrut.

== Works ==
Filmography

- Biograf (1997)
- Bajky ze zahrady (2003)
- O Kanafáskovi (2004)
- Hra (2004)
- Nešťastné narozeniny Péti Fotky (2005)
- O Kanafáskovi II. (2008)
