= Theatre in Dlouhá Street =

Theatre in Prague, Czech Republic

- Divadlo v Dlouhé
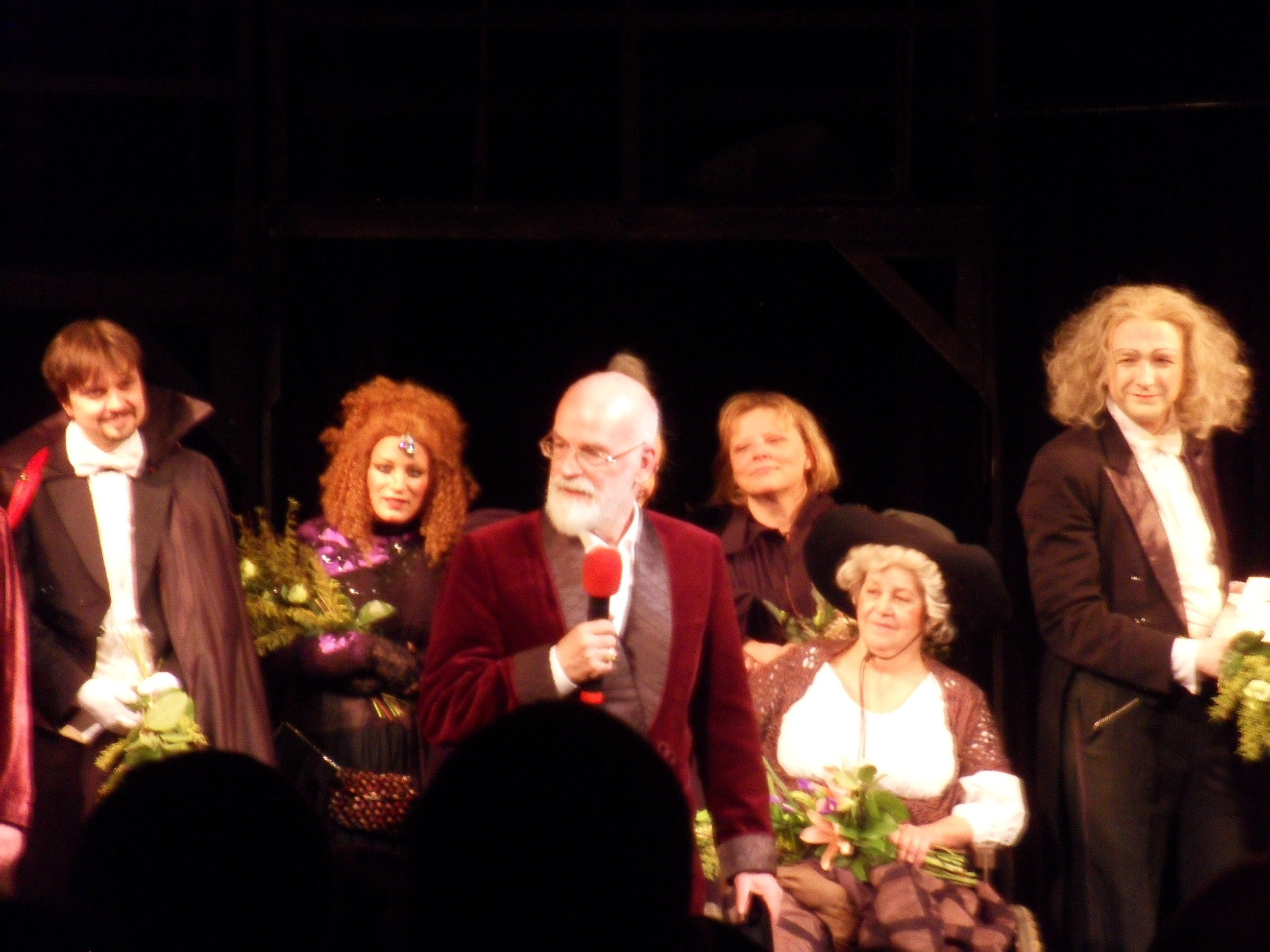
- performance Maskerade or The Phantom of the Opera
- Interactive map of Theatre in Dlouhá Street
- Address: Dlouhá 727/39; Prague 1 Czech Republic
- Coordinates: 50°5′28.3″N 14°25′35.8″E

Construction
- Opened: 1996

Website
- www.divadlovdlouhe.cz/english/

Theatre in Dlouhá Street (Czech: Divadlo v Dlouhé) is a repertoire theatre established in 1996 with financing from the Municipality of Prague.

== History ==
The building was originally constructed in 1929 in Old Town Prague, with art deco designs by Emil Sušický and Pavlo Sydow. Designed for operetta performances, its opening night would be December 4, 1929 and would operate until its closure by Nazi authorities in 1944. After the war, it reopened as a soviet political education center for children. This would end with the velvet revolution, it would reopen under its current program in 1996. In 2002, floods from the Vltava river damaged the theatre requiring reconstruction and allowing for modernization, some original features from the 1930s remain.

== Current operations ==
Actors include graduates of the Theatre Academy of Musical Arts and the Department of Alternative and Marionette Theatre. The repertoire puts on a variety of performances. The Theatre hosts the Child in Dlouhá / Dítě v Dlouhé festival which is focused on children's theatre. Divadlo v Dlouhé was nominated several times for Alfréd Radok Award in the category Theatre of the Year. Grabbe's Don Juan and Faust and Sestra Úzkost won the category Performance of the Year. The theatre hosted its first performance with English subtitles in 2019.

The theatre is headed by Daniela Šálková. The key directors are Hana Burešová and Jan Borna. The most prominent actors are Miroslav Táborský, Jan Vondráček, Vlastimil Zavřel, Jaroslava Pokorná and Klára Sedláčková. Notable guest actors include Karel Roden, Martin Huba and Petr Skoumal.

== See also ==
- If the Pig Had Wings
