= Banín =

- Municipality
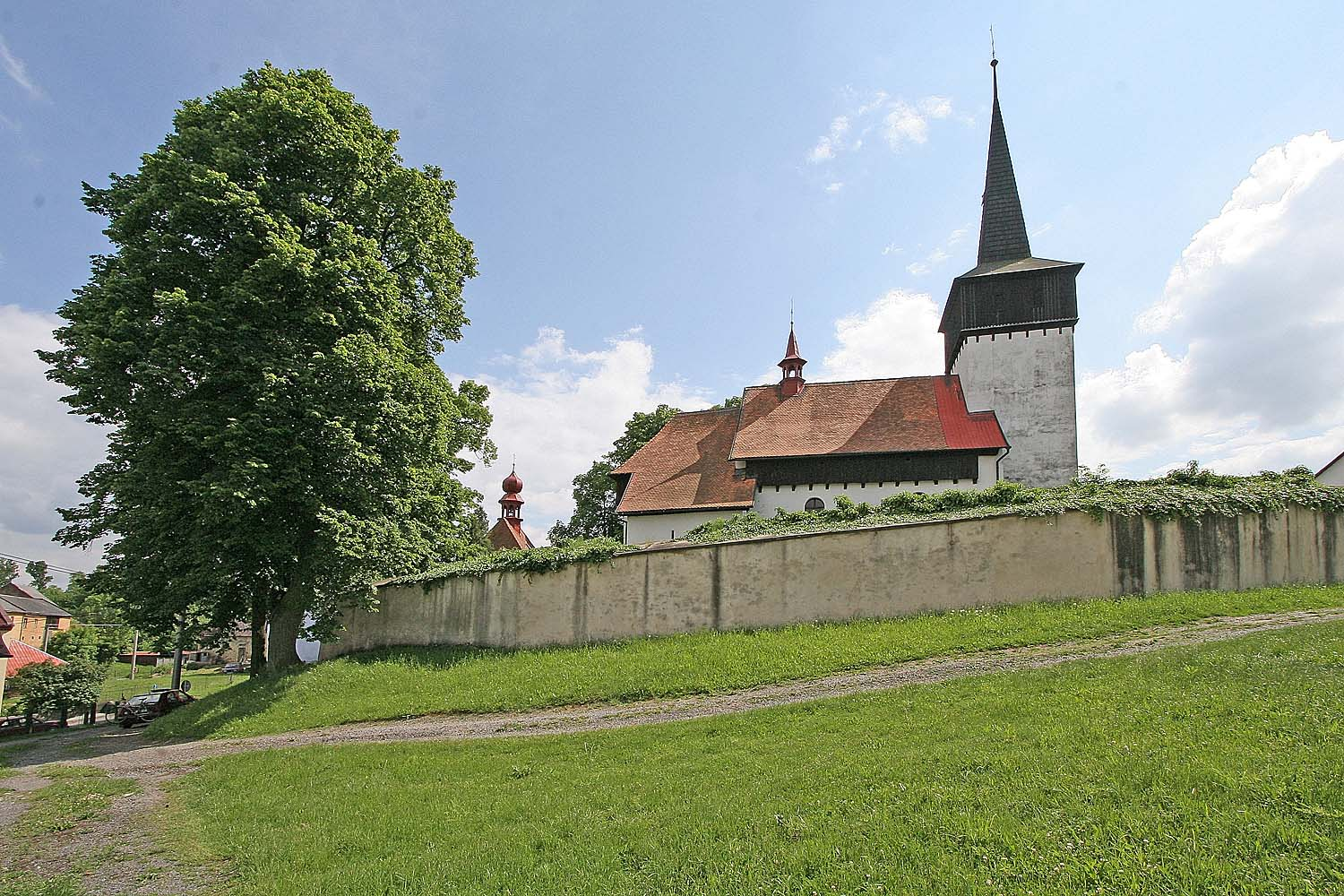
- Church of Saint Barbara

- Flag Coat of arms

- Location in the Czech Republic
- Coordinates: 49°39′56″N 16°27′43″E
- Country: Czech Republic
- Region: Pardubice
- District: Svitavy
- First mentioned: 1291

Area
  - Total: 12.92 km^{2} (4.99 sq mi)
- Elevation: 454 m (1,490 ft)

Population (2026-01-01)
  - Total: 300
  - Density: 23/km^{2} (60/sq mi)
- Time zone: UTC+1 (CET)
  - Summer (DST): UTC+2 (CEST)
- Postal code: 568 02
- Website: www.banin.cz

Banín (German: Bohnau) is a municipality and village in Svitavy District in the Pardubice Region of the Czech Republic. It has about 300 inhabitants.

Banín lies approximately 11 kilometres (7 mi) south of Svitavy, 64 km (40 mi) south-east of Pardubice, and 153 km (95 mi) east of Prague.

== Demographics ==
Historical population
Year	Pop.	±%
1869	701	—
1880	668	−4.7%
1890	702	+5.1%
1900	719	+2.4%
1910	731	+1.7%
1921	696	−4.8%
1930	694	−0.3%
1950	367	−47.1%
1961	403	+9.8%
1970	357	−11.4%
1980	328	−8.1%
1991	276	−15.9%
2001	304	+10.1%
2011	301	−1.0%
2021	280	−7.0%
Source: Censuses

== Notable people ==
- Jan Felkl (1817–1887), industrialist and globe maker
