= Vladimír Jiránek =

Czech illustrator and cartoonist (1938–2012)

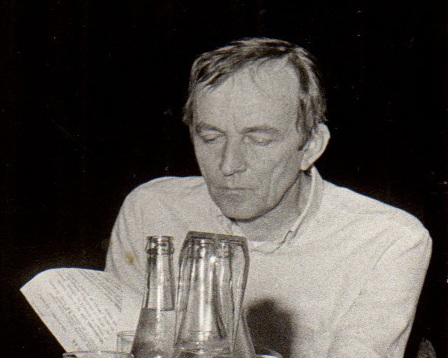
- Jiránek in 1990
- Born: 6 June 1938; Hradec Králové, Czechoslovakia
- Died: 6 November 2012 (aged 74); Prague, Czech Republic
- Education: Charles University
- Known for: Pat & Mat; Bob a Bobek – králíci z klobouku

Vladimír Jiránek (6 June 1938 – 6 November 2012) was a Czech illustrator, cartoonist and director of animated films. Most of his work was intended for an adult audience, but his best-known works are the animated series for children Pat & Mat and Bob a Bobek – králíci z klobouku.

== Biography ==
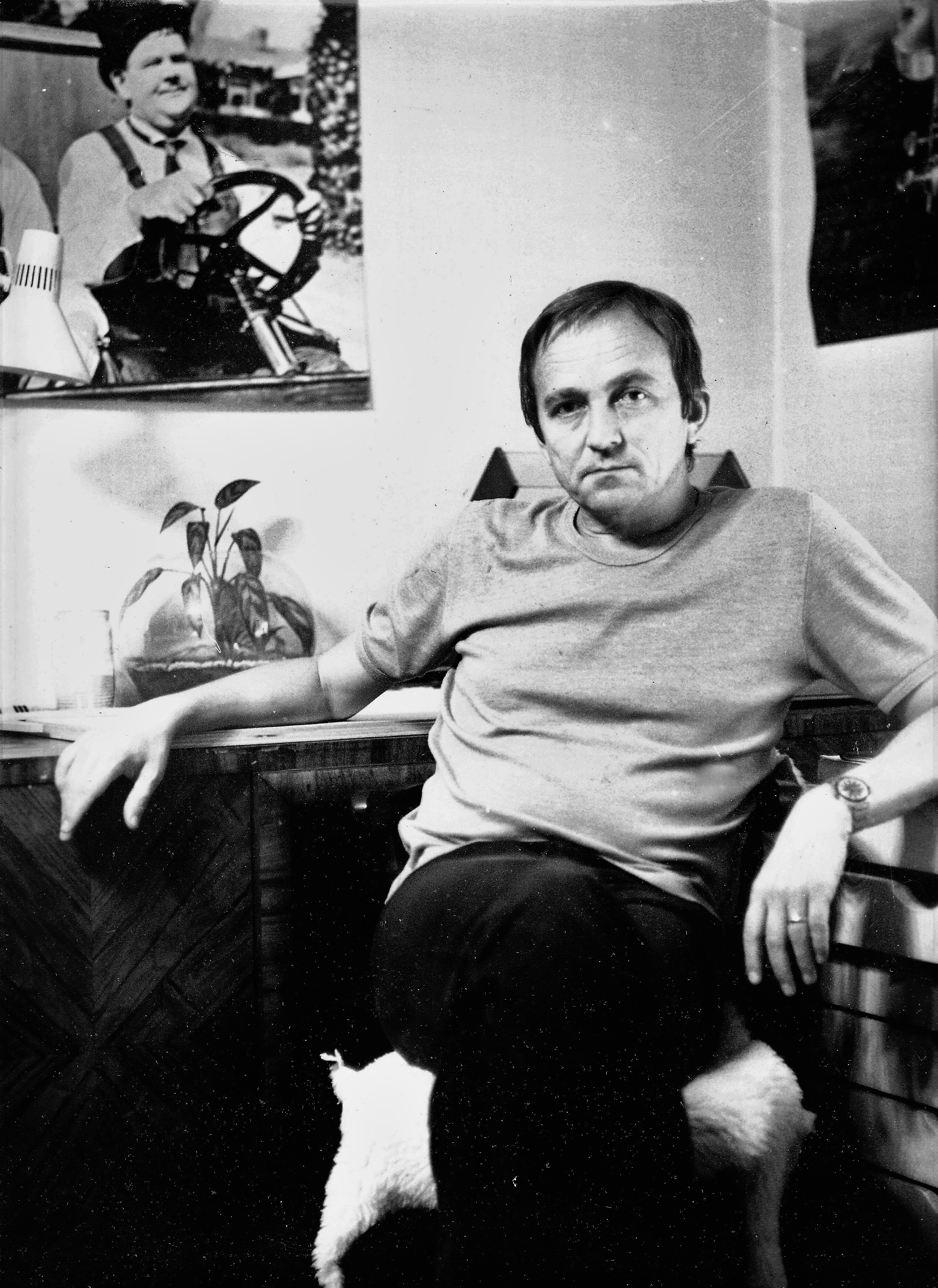
Jiránek in the 1980s

Vladimír Jiránek was born in Hradec Králové on 6 June 1938, but he spent almost his entire life in Prague. He graduated from the Faculty of Arts of Charles University in Prague with a degree in journalism. He was a freelance illustrator and cartoonist all his life. He started drawing during his studies and offered his illustrations to various magazines to earn some money. He closely cooperated with the magazines Mladý svět, Literární noviny, Vesmír, Technický magazín and Melodie.

After the Prague Spring in 1968, he was banned from publishing for political reasons, but he got a job at Krátký film Praha (a company focused on producing short films) in the Bratři v triku studio. Here he met Václav Bedřich, who introduced him to the creation of cartoons. His most famous works – the animated series for children Pat & Mat and Bob a Bobek – králíci z klobouku – were created here. In the 1980s, he returned to drawing and illustrating. After the Velvet Revolution in 1989, he started drawing political cartoons. He regularly collaborated with the newspapers Lidové noviny and Mladá fronta DNES, and with the Reflex magazine. He died after a long illness in Prague on 6 November 2012, aged 74.

Jiránek considered himself a humorist. Together with Vladimír Renčín and later Dušan Pálka, he became a representative of a school of Czech illustrators who drew jokes without open satire, but people read them as an innuendo to politics. He became a role model for many of his successors.

== Honours ==
In 1998, Jiránek won the Karel Poláček Award in the category "Humor of the Wise". In 2005, he was awarded by the Czech Republic's Medal of Merit (Second Class) for services to the state in the field of culture. In 2009, the Czech Union of Caricaturists awarded him the Order of the White Monkey (award given for lifetime achievement in the field of caricature).

In 2014, Jiránek was posthumously awarded Honorary Citizenship of Prague 1.

The main-belt asteroid 17694 Jiránek was named after Vladimír Jiránek.

== Selected filmography ==
Jiránek created twenty animated films. His films have been awarded many times at foreign film competitions. Among notable Jiránek's films are:

- Pivo přes ulici (1974)
- Pat & Mat (1976)
- Co jsme udělali slepicím (1977) – co-director, story, illustrations; awarded by the Golden Bear for best short film
- Bob a Bobek – králíci z klobouku (1977)
- Hokej je hra (1978)
- Srdečný pozdrav ze zeměkoule (1981) – animated inserts
- Pozor, bonbon (1990) – co-illustrations

== Books ==
- Anekdoty pro civilizaci (Anecdotes for civilization, 1977)
- Běžte a milujte se (1987)
- Bob a Bobek – králíci z klobouku (Bob and Bobek, 1988)
- Knížka pro snílky (A book for dreamers, 1989)
- Události (Events, 1990)
- Doktorská knížka (1997)
- (Ne)kuřácká knížka (Book for (non)smokers, 2000)
- To byla léta devadesátá (2000)
