= Petr Skoumal =

Czech musician and composer (1938–2014)

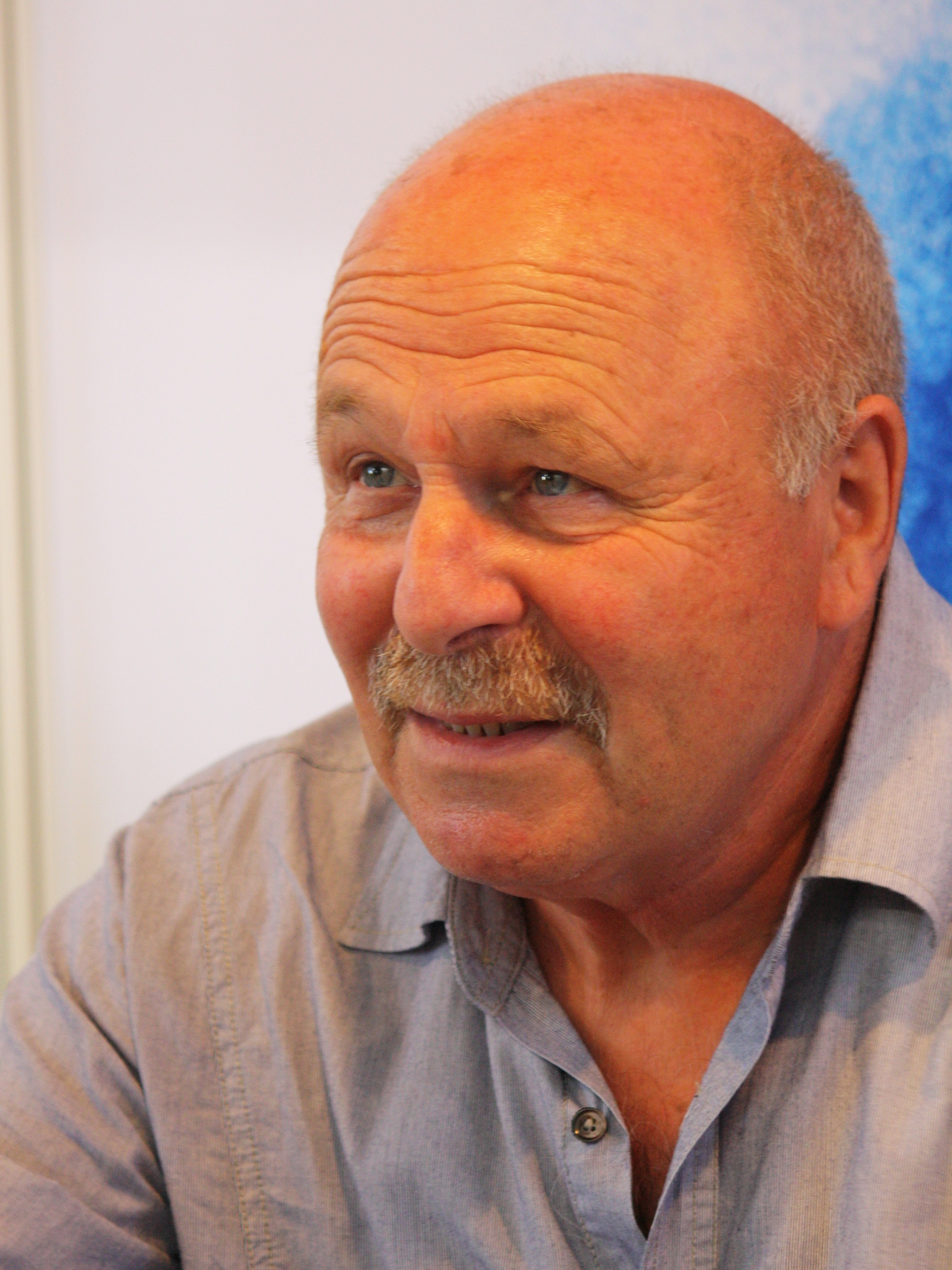
- Skoumal in 2013
- Born: 7 March 1938; Prague, Czechoslovakia
- Died: 28 September 2014 (aged 76); Prague, Czech Republic
- Education: Janáček Academy of Performing Arts

Petr Skoumal (7 March 1938 – 28 September 2014) was a Czech musician and composer. He is best known as a composer of music for films and theatre performances.

== Biography ==
Petr Skoumal was born on 7 March 1938 in Prague to Aloys Skoumal and Hana Skoumalová, both notable translators from English. He learned to play the piano from childhood and also received lessons in London when his father worked there as a cultural attaché after World War II. Because he had a small finger span, he was not accepted to study piano at university. He studied conducting at the Prague Conservatory and then choir management at the Janáček Academy of Performing Arts in Brno.

After his studies, he worked on stage music, especially at The Drama Club in Prague, where he was a director and musical dramaturg. In the 1960s, he began collaborating with the writer Jan Vodňanský there. Their parody performances were a great success. After Vodňanský signed Charter 77 and became an enemy of the communist regime in Czechoslovakia, the duo had to stop working and they were forbidden from appearing on TV and radio.

He died in the Military Hospital in Prague on 28 September 2014, aged 76. His funeral was held at the Strašnice Crematorium in Prague.

== Musical work ==
Petr Skoumal is best known as a composer of film music. Among the films he has composed music for are Jára Cimrman Lying, Sleeping, Dissolved and Effused and the animated shorts Maxipes Fík, Pat & Mat and Bob a Bobek – králíci z klobouku. In the 1990s, he started a series of albums for children, based on the stories of Emanuel Frynta, Pavel Šrut and Jan Vodňanský (i.e. If the Pig Had Wings, Pastries, How to hunt a Gorilla). If the Pig Had Wings was made into a stage performance for Theatre in Dlouhá Street in Prague, which had 300 reruns between 1996 and 2013.

Skoumal collaborated with a many notable musicians, such as Luboš Pospíšil and Michal Prokop. For several years he was a member of Vladimír Mišík's Etc band. He also made several albums with songs for adults: …se nezblázni (1989), Poločas rozpadu (1990), Hotelový pokoje (1994), Březen (1999), and Nebo cibule (2006).

In total, Skoumal composed music for more than two hundred theatre performances, television productions and films. He has 779 compositions registered with the Copyright Protection Association. In 2013, he received an award from this association for the most successful Czech composer abroad.
