= Jan Vodňanský =

Czech writer

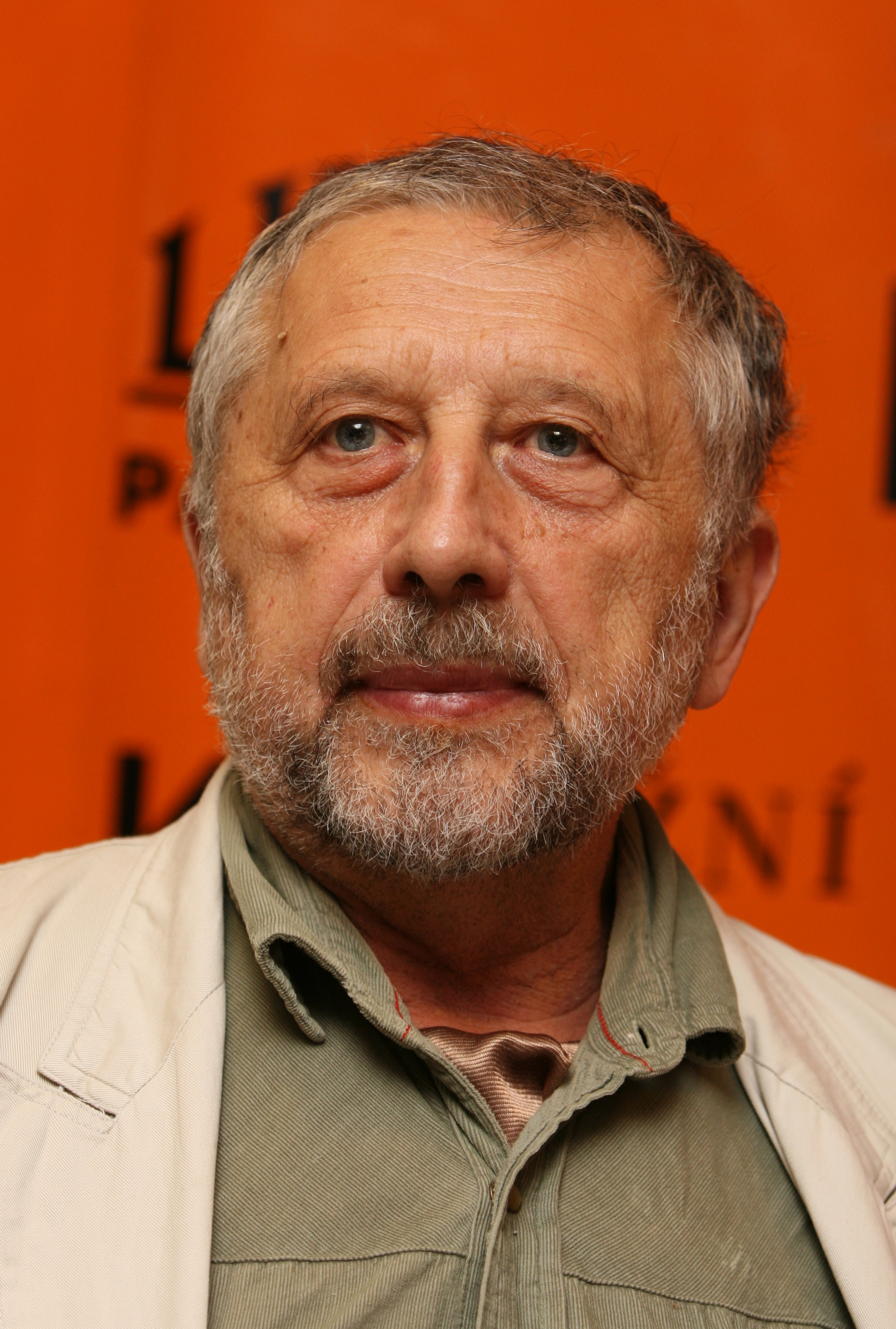
- Jan Vodňanský in 2008
- Born: 19 June 1941; Prague, Protectorate of Bohemia and Moravia
- Died: 10 March 2021 (aged 79)
- Education: Czech Technical University in Prague, Faculty of Arts, Charles University

Jan Vodňanský (19 June 1941 – 10 March 2021) was a Czech writer, songwriter, singer and humorist. He was best known for his collaboration with musician Petr Skoumal.

== Biography ==
Vodňanský was born on 19 June 1941 in Prague. He studied at the Construction Faculty of the Czech Technical University, later he studied philosophy and history at the Faculty of Arts, Charles University and obtained PhDr title. After his studies, he started working in radio and in 1964 he met composer and pianist Petr Skoumal, with whom he began to collaborate. After Vodňanský signed Charter 77 and became an enemy of the communist regime in Czechoslovakia, the duo had to stop working.

After the breakup of the duo, Vodňanský worked in Bratislava and performed in programs for children. After the Velvet Revolution, he lectured philosophy at the Faculty of Arts, Charles University, and performed in theatres and on foreign tours. He died on 10 March 2021, at the age of 79 from COVID-19 during the COVID-19 pandemic in the Czech Republic.

== Work ==
Playing with words and ironic humor were typical for Vodňanský's work. He started by writing texts based on absurd humor, he also wrote songs and texts for children. With Petr Skoumal he composed several songs for radio fairy tales and for films for children. The breakthrough was their full-length program in the Drama Club called S úsměvem idiota ("With an Idiot's Smile"), which was also published as an audio recording and as a book.
