= Pavel Šrut =

Czech poet and writer

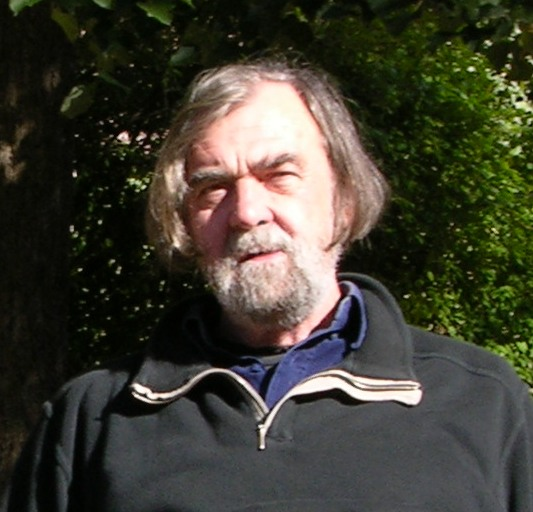
Šrut in 2005

Pavel Šrut (3 April 1940 – 20 April 2018) was a Czech poet and writer.

== Life and career ==
Šrut was born on 3 April 1940 in Prague. After graduating in 1967 from the Charles University in Prague, where he studied English and Spanish, he worked as an editor in a publishing house. Since 1972, he was a freelance writer and translator. Together with poets such as Ivan Wernisch and Petr Kabeš, Šrut belonged to the famous generation of Czech poets who published their first books in the 1960s. Like so many of his contemporaries, he was not allowed to publish books of his poems during the Soviet occupation, except for books for children. His work was often done together with an award-winning Czech painter and illustrator Galina Miklínová (e. g. Verunka a kokosový dědek (2004) which is included on the IBBY list, as is his 1992 book Kočičí král which is a collection of English, Irish, Scottish and Welsh fairy-tales) and lyrics for Czech musicians like Petr Skoumal, and Framus Five.

Apart from his celebrated poetry and books for children, he was also a translator from English and Spanish. His translations include books of Dylan Thomas, Robert Graves, D. H. Lawrence, Leonard Cohen, John Updike, Federico García Lorca, and others.

Šrut lived in Zdice.

Western Michigan University offered the Pavel Šrut Poetry Fellowship in their Prague Summer program, where Šrut appeared sometimes as a guest or guest faculty member.

== Works ==
Poetry

- Noc plná křídel (1964)
- Přehlásky (1967)
- Červotočivé světlo (1969)
- Malá domů (1989)
- Přestupný duben (1989)
- Kolej Yesterday (1990) (a collection of his lyrics)
- Cadus rotundus - Sud kulatý (with Eugen Brikcius) (1993)
- Zlá milá (1997)
- Brožované básně (2000) - for these two books he was awarded the prestigious Jaroslav Seifert Prize in 2000
- Papírové polobotky (2001)

Essays

- Konzul v afrikánech (1998)

For children (selection)

- Pavouček Pája (2001)
- Veliký tůdle (2003)
- Verunka a kokosový dědek (2004)
- Příšerky a příšeři (2005)
- Šišatý švec a myšut (2008) (all five with Galina Miklínová)
