= Austin High School (El Paso, Texas) =

Coordinates: 31.7994°N 106.451°W

Stephen F. Austin High School
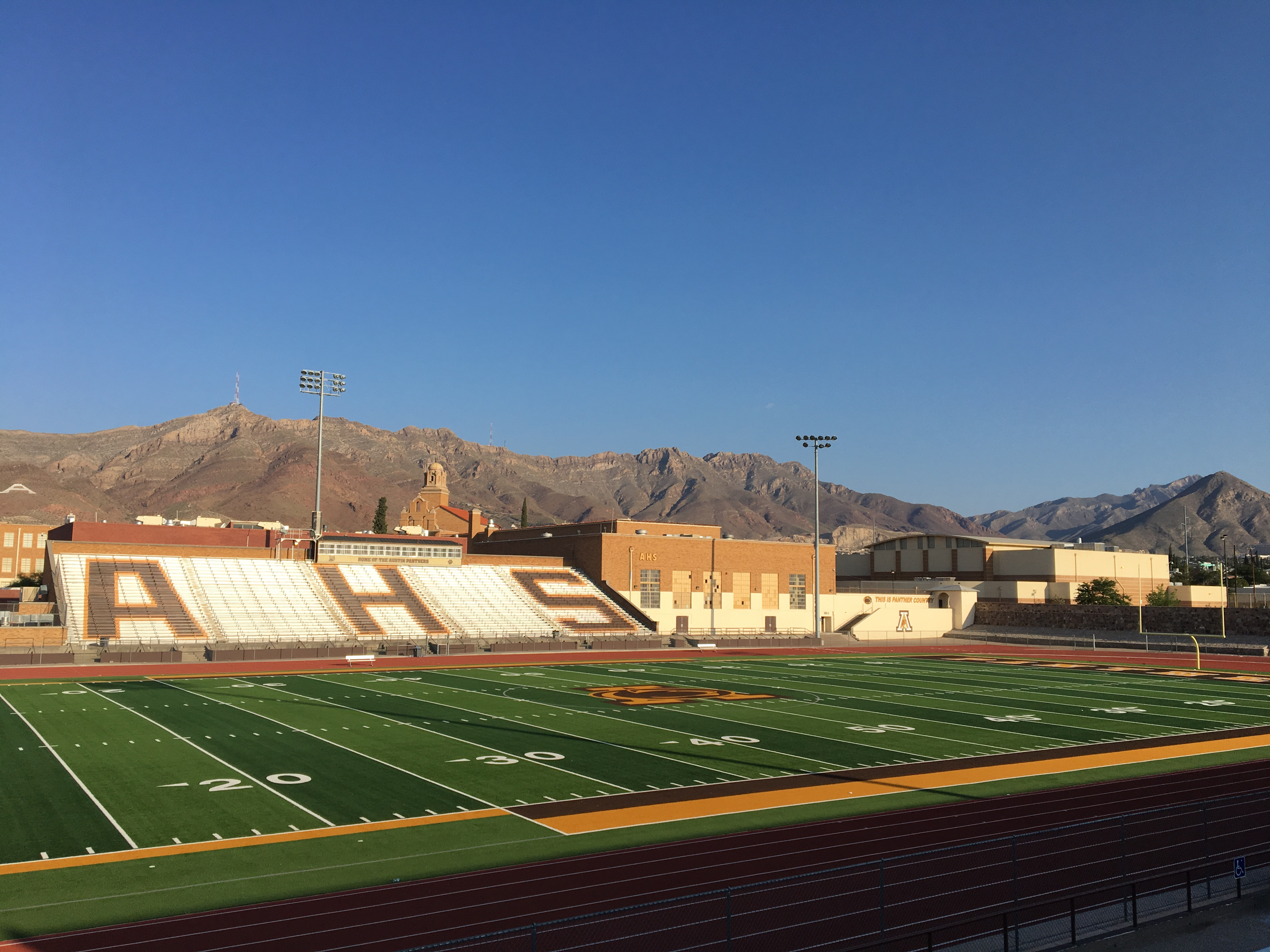
- Austin High School from R.E. McKee Stadium

Location
- 3500 Memphis Avenue; El Paso, Texas 79930; United States

Information
- Type: Public
- Established: 1930
- Principal: Cydni Ponce
- Staff: 93.85 (FTE)
- Grades: 9-12
- Enrollment: 1,381 (2017–18)
- Student to teacher ratio: 14.71
- Colors: Brown & Gold
- Mascot: Golden Panther
- Nickname: The School with Pride
- Website: www.episd.org/o/auhs

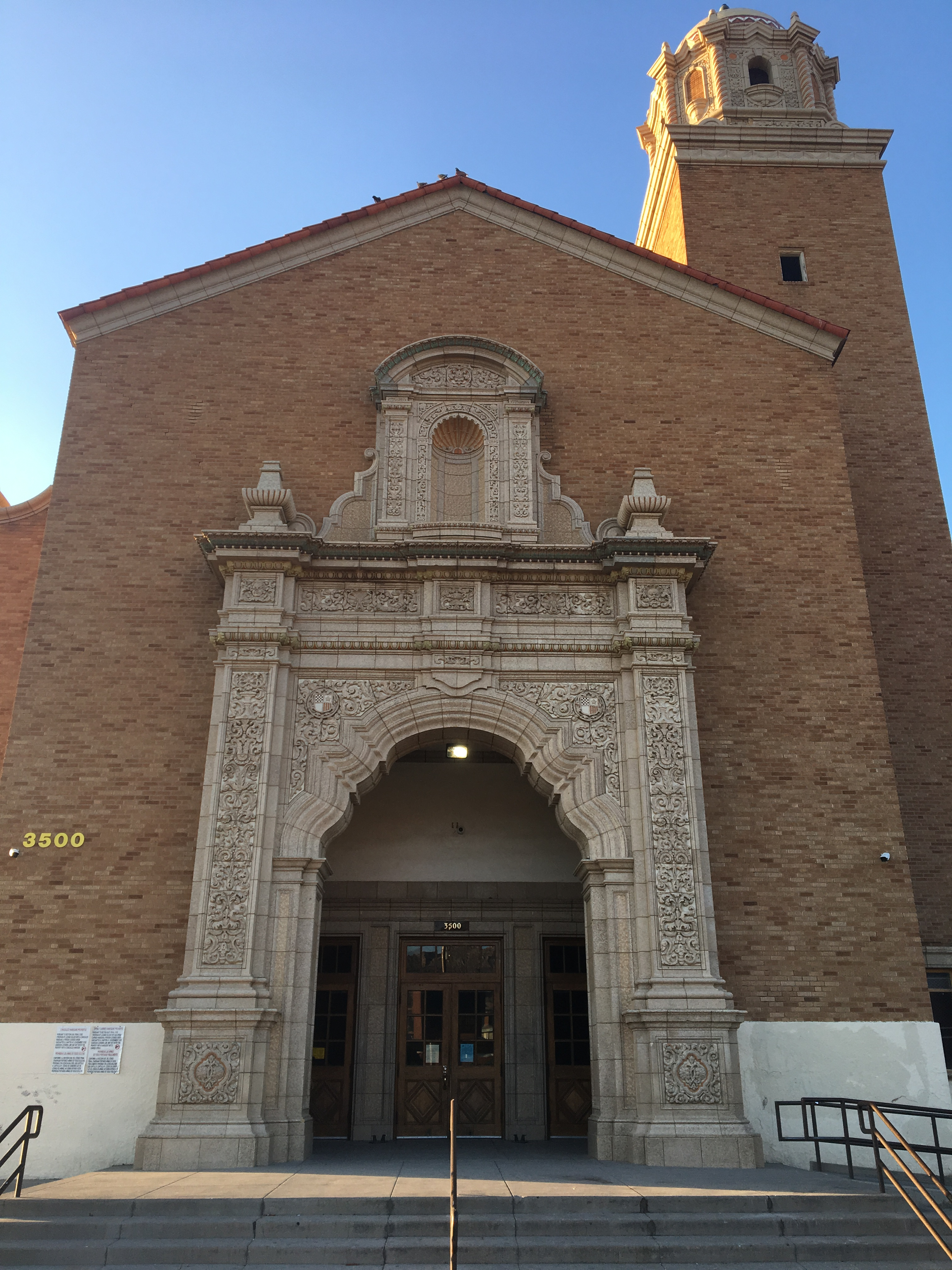
Front of Austin High School, summer of 2019

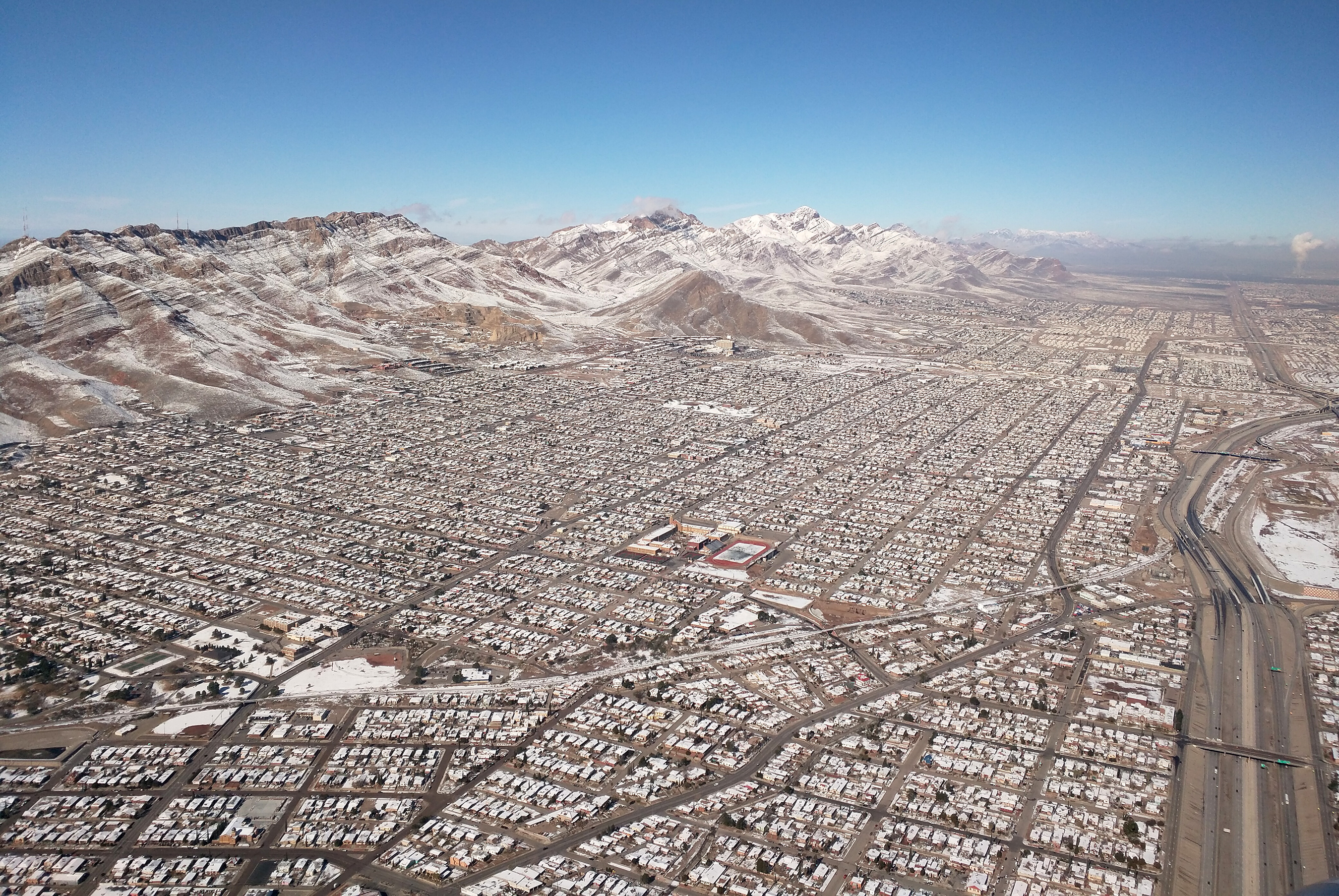
Austin High School (center) and surrounding areas of El Paso and the Franklin Mountains with snow from winter storm Goliath

Stephen F. Austin High School is a high school in El Paso, Texas. Austin opened in 1930. It is part of the El Paso Independent School District. The school's mascot is a golden panther named "Henry." Austin High School is located in the heart of historic Central El Paso and serves the Central community.

The school was designed by Texas contractor and architect Robert E. McKee. When the local school district ran out of money during the construction, McKee donated the remainder owed. Consequently, the school's football stadium is named in McKee's honor. The R.E. McKee Construction Company built the school and used a classic Spanish architecture. The structure is surmounted by a 103-foot tower. The classrooms had marble floors and the hallways are floored with terrazzo.

The Aero Vista area of Fort Bliss is zoned to Austin High.

== The "A" ==
The school, located minutes from the Franklin Mountains, faces a large, white, block "A" letter painted on the mountain. AHS students traditionally light the "A" on Homecoming night's football game which is played at R.E. McKee Stadium. The "A" is lit by placing small cans, full of kerosene and sawdust, around the "A" and lighting them before kickoff. The burning "A" is visible from the home bleachers and AHS supporters chant "Hey, Hey, Look at the A" to signify its lighting.

== "Elroy" ==
The school has an actual, stuffed Golden Panther in the main lobby. The Panther is named "Elroy" after Austin High English and Creative Writing teacher and author Elroy Bode. Bode is a famed West Texas author and has published several books, including Home Country: An Elroy Bode Reader, Commonplace Mysteries, and This Favored Place: The Texas Hill Country.

In 1998, Mr. Gary Mowad, a special agent for the United States Fish and Wildlife Service and former Austin teacher, approached the Austin High School about donating a stuffed panther to display on campus. Elroy was hunted illegally in Colorado by a hunter who unlawfully used a spotlight in pursuit of the panther. Consequently, Elroy was seized by the United States Fish and Wildlife Service and the hunter was sentenced to four years of prison time.

At the conclusion of the litigation in September 2002, the Panther was transported to El Paso and donated to the school through the Austin High School Alumni Association, who then presented this spectacular animal to Austin High School. On January 7, 2004, the Panther was placed in the lobby where it can be viewed today.

== Austin Alumni Association ==
The Austin High School Alumni Association (AAA) was formed in 1991 to serve and support Austin High School and its students. The first Board of Directors was elected on May 16, 1991. The AAA is a 501c3 non-profit organization.

== Notable alumni ==
- Anita Lee Blair (1916-2010), Texas state legislator
- Heidi V. Brown, class of 1977, was the first woman to command an air defense battalion.
- Rufus Brown, class of 1999, played professional football for the Washington Redskins after playing at Florida State University under Bobby Bowden.
- Ronald D. Coleman, Democrat, elected to the 98th United States Congress and served six terms in office before electing not to run for re-election to the 105th United States Congress.
- Mary Cunningham Hoover was a top athlete in rodeo, tennis, and golf.
- Rebeca Huddle was appointed to the Supreme Court of Texas by Governor Greg Abbott in October 2020. After graduating from Stephen F. Austin High School, Justice Huddle earned her undergraduate degree from Stanford University. Justice Huddle earned her law degree at the University of Texas School of Law, where she was the recipient of three endowed presidential scholarships and graduated with honors.
- Terry Manning, Music Producer, Engineer, composer, recording artist and inventor. Began in music with all-AHS member band "Terry Manning and The Wild Ones," playing local dances. After moving to Memphis, became well known in popular music.
- Tom Moore, cartoonist of the Archie Comic Books, also graduated from Austin High in 1946. Moore was also a cartoonist for Underdog and Mighty Mouse.
- Sandra Day O'Connor, Supreme Court Justice, graduated 6th in her class in 1946 and attended her 50th reunion. The school honored O'Connor by naming a magnet school located on the Austin campus the Sandra Day O'Connor Criminal Justice/Public Service Academy, in her honor.
- Pat O'Rourke served as El Paso county judge.
- Jimmy Ortega, Hollywood stuntman who has appeared as a stuntman in over 120 motion pictures including Lakeview Terrace, G-Force, Ocean's 13, Mr. & Mrs. Smith, and Spider-Man 2. Ortega has also appeared, as an actor, in several films and television shows.
- Dave Simmons, class of 1960, played professional football for the St. Louis Cardinals, New Orleans Saints, and Dallas Cowboys after playing at Georgia Tech.
- Ron Stallworth, class of 1971, is an American retired police officer who infiltrated the ranks of the Ku Klux Klan in Colorado Springs, Colorado in the late 1970s. He was the first African-American police officer and detective in the Colorado Springs Police Department. The 2018 film BlacKkKlansman is based on his life and early career.
- Kenny Thomas, NBA player and All-American basketball player at the University of New Mexico. Thomas attended Austin High for three years before transferring and graduating from high school in Albuquerque, New Mexico. Thomas was the 22nd overall pick in the 1999 NBA draft and was selected by the Houston Rockets.
- Kimie Yanagawa, class of 1932, was an educator who was the first Japanese woman to be naturalized in the United States under the McCarran immigration act.
