= Tom Moore (cartoonist) =

American cartoonist

- Born: May 16, 1928 El Paso, Texas, U.S.
- Died: July 20, 2015 (aged 86–87) El Paso, Texas
- Area: Artist
- Notable works: Archie Comics

Tom Moore (May 16, 1928 – July 20, 2015) was an American cartoonist and member of National Cartoonists Society, known for his work on the Archie Comic Book series in the late 1950s, and then again in the late 1980s.

Moore was born in El Paso, Texas, and was a 1946 graduate of Austin High School in El Paso. He began drawing cartoons while serving in the United States Navy during the Korean War. He attended the University of Texas at El Paso, the American Academy of Art in Chicago, and the Cartoonists and Illustrators School (renamed the School of Visual Arts in 1956) in New York, the latter funded by the G.I. Bill. Some of his instructors during that time were Tom Gill and Tarzan comic strip illustrator Burne Hogarth. Moore was the Staff Cartoonist in the Texas Navy at Corpus Christi. After his discharge, he married his wife, Ruth, and they lived on Long Island for eight years. During this time he freelanced for Archie Comics, primarily working on Archie's Joke Book, and collaborated with other Archie creators such as George Gladir, Orlando Busino, Sy Reit, and Frank Doyle.

In 1961, Moore moved his family back to El Paso. There he created the Chick Call strip feature which appeared worldwide in American Armed Forces publications. He did other local freelance work and assisted Fred Lasswell on the Snuffy Smith comic strip, until 1964 when he took a full-time job as Director of PR and Advertising for Mutual Savings & Loan, run by his father. He resumed freelance cartooning in 1970, but it wasn't until the late 1980s that he returned to Archie Comics, initially as the inker for the launch of the second volume of the Jughead title.

During his time at Archie, Moore also did freelance inking for Spotlight Comics on their Underdog and Mighty Mouse titles.

After he retired in 1988, he taught at El Paso Community College for a number of years.

Moore died in El Paso on July 20, 2015, from throat cancer at the age of 86.
