= Yanagawa =

Yanagawa may refer to:

- Yanagawa, Fukuoka
- Yanagawa, Fukushima
- Yanagawa (surname)
- Yanagawa (film)
