= Spotlight Comics =

Defunct American comics publishing company

- Status: defunct in 1989; 36 years ago
- Founded: 1983; 42 years ago
- Founders: Rich Maurizio, Kelley Jarvis, Jim Main
- Country of origin: United States
- Headquarters location: Connecticut
- Key people: Rich Maurizio, publisher Jim Main, editor
- Publication types: Comics
- Imprints: TV Comics; Airwave Comics

Spotlight Comics was an American comic publisher based in western Connecticut. It is best known for a short run of comic books based on licensed characters such as Mighty Mouse and Heckle and Jeckle that contained contributions from several major US comic book creators.

== Company history ==
After beginning his career in collectible magazines such as the Comics Collector and Toy Values Monthly, Richard "Rich" Maurizio and his then-significant other Kelley Jarvis wrote, drew, and published two issues of a comic entitled Samurai Squirrel: Master of the Sword, under the publisher name Spotlight Comics starting in 1983. They also produced a comic containing reprints of the daily Stern Wheeler comic strip from The Hartford Times, illustrated by Jim Aparo, and another comic, L. T. Caper, Agent for H.E.R.O. (the Higher Espionage Reinforcement Organization), written and drawn by Maurizio.

Spotlight expanded into licensed character comics and acquired the rights to Mighty Mouse, Underdog, and other properties. The company ran into financial problems in 1988 and ceased operations in 1989. In the end, they only produced a total of 11 individual issues of their various titles.

Notable writers and artists who contributed to the Spotlight titles included Curt Swan, Joe Gill, Win Mortimer, Frank Mclaughlin, Tom Moore, Gary Fields, Bill White, Ray Dirgo, Doug Cushman, Nate Butler, Jim Engel, John A. Wilcox, Mark Scott Marcus, Milton Knight, Paul Chadwick, and Mike Tiefenbacher.

The Spotlight Comics titles were all edited by Jim Main.

== Post-Spotlight ==
After Spotlight's demise, Maurizio and Jarvis co-produced the Tom & Jerry comic strip for a five-year run.

In the late 1990s and early 2000s, Maurizio packaged and edited licensed comics such as The Munsters and I Dream of Jeannie for the short-lived publishers TV Comics and Airwave Comics.

== Titles published ==
One issue published per title, unless otherwise noted

=== Original titles ===
- Samurai Squirrel (1986–1987) — 2 issues
- Stern Wheeler #1 (1986)
- L.T. Caper (1986)

=== Licensed characters ===
- The Beagles #5 (1989) - 6 issues
- Mighty Heroes (1987)
- Mighty Mouse (1987) — 2 issues
  - Mighty Mouse and Friends Holiday Special (1987)
  - Mighty Mouse Adventure Magazine (1987)
- Underdog #2 (1987) — 3 issues
- Tennessee Tuxedo #3 (1986) - 4 issues
- King Leonardo #4 (1983) - 5 issues

== Characters ==
- Mighty Mouse
- Heckle and Jeckle
- Underdog
- King Leonardo
- Tennessee Tuxedo
- The Beagles
- Deputy Dawg
