= Mary Cunningham Hoover =

Mary Hoover (born Cunningham January 15, 1928 - May 18, 2020) was an American athlete who lived in El Paso, Texas and Fabens, Texas.

== Biography ==
Hoover attended Crockett Elementary School where she was involved in swimming, track, basketball and football. At age 5, she started participating in rodeo. She attended Austin High School, was crowned a Grand Champion in rodeo at age 15 and started playing tennis and cheerleading. In 1943, Hoover won the junior girls doubles in the Southwestern Tennis Association Championships.

Hoover went on to attend the University of Arizona (UofA), where she played golf. At UofA, she was on the women's golf and tennis teams. In 1945 and 1947, she was the singles tennis champion and in 1946, the doubles champion. She was ranked 7th nationally and went on to become a member of the Junior Wightman Cup Team. At UofA, she was a member of Kappa Kappa Gamma and was the university "rodeo queen."

In 1948, she married Joseph R. Hoover and moved to the family's cotton farm in Fabens, Texas. In 1963, the family moved to El Paso for their children's school prospects. She stayed active in the Junior League of El Paso and the school PTA. She was also involved with the Sun Carnival and University of Texas at El Paso (UTEP) sports. She was also a championship winning regional golfer. In 1974, Hoover was inducted into the El Paso Athletic Hall of Fame and the El Paso Herald-Post called her "one of El Paso's greatest living athletes."

Two of Hoover's three children died in a car accident in 1997. Hoover died on May 18, 2020 and her ashes were scattered at the Church of St. Clement in El Paso.
