= Yanagawa (surname) =

Yanagawa is a Japanese surname. Notable people with the surname include:

- Akira Yanagawa (born 1971), Japanese motorcycle racer
- Harumi Yanagawa, Japanese athlete
- Heisuke Yanagawa (1879–1945), Japanese general
- Kimie Yanagawa (1915–1997), Japanese-American educator
- Masaki Yanagawa (born 1987), Japanese footballer
- Yanagawa Shigenobu (1787–1932), Japanese painter
