= 43rd Air Defense Artillery Regiment =

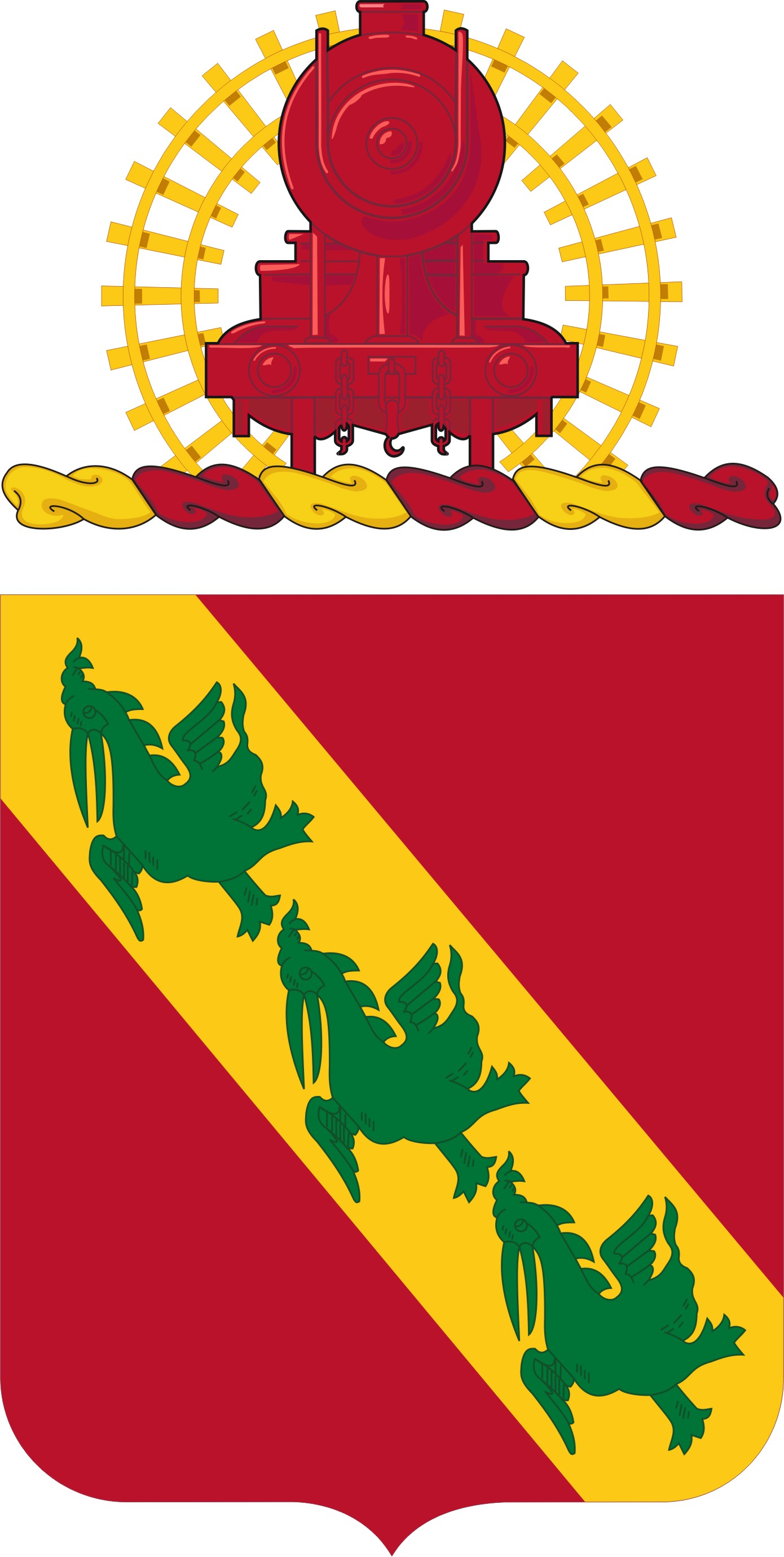
- Coat of arms
- Active: 1918
- Country: USA
- Branch: Army
- Type: Air defense artillery
- Motto: SUSTINEMUS (We Support)
- Branch color: Scarlet
- Decorations: Presidential Unit Citation with Three Oak Leaf clusters Navy Unit Commendation; Air and Space Outstanding Unit Award

Insignia
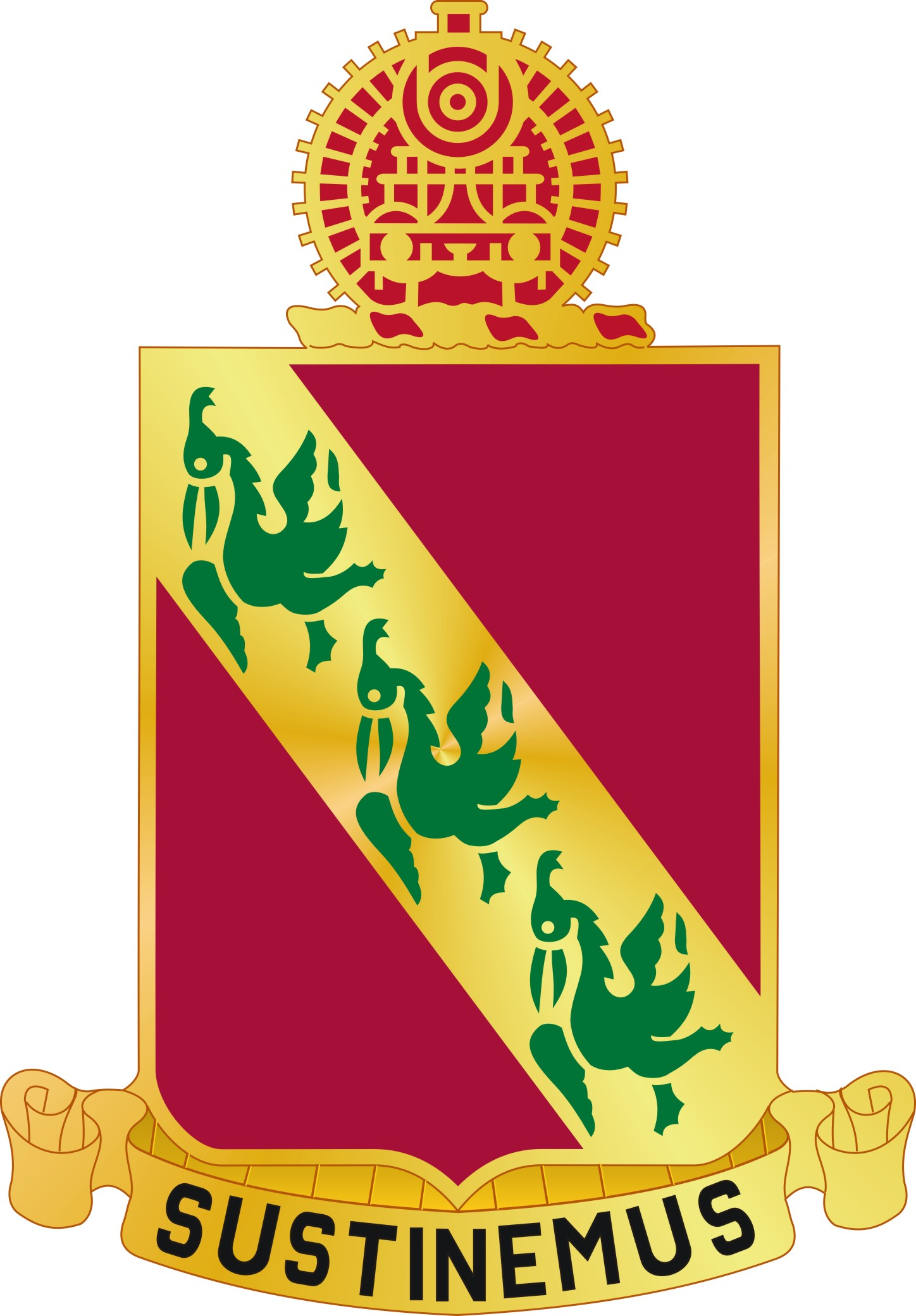
- Distinctive unit insignia

The 43rd Air Defense Artillery Regiment is an air defense artillery regiment of the United States Army first constituted 1918 in the Regular Army.

In 2018, its battalions use Patriot antimissiles, and are cross-training with THAAD.

In 2020, the 2-43 Air Defense Artillery Battalion deploy two Iron Dome.

== History ==
When Heidi V. Brown took over the battalion in the 1990s, she became the first woman to command an air defense battalion.

== Lineage ==
Constituted 29 June 1918 in the Regular Army as the 43rd Artillery (Coast Artillery Corps)

Organized 7 August 1918 in France from existing Regular Army units and one New York National Guard company

(National Guard company demobilized in February 1919; regiment continued on active status)

Inactivated 17 August 1921 at Camp Eustis, Virginia

Redesignated 1 July 1924 as the 43rd Coast Artillery

Disbanded 14 June 1944

43rd Coast Artillery reconstituted 28 June 1950 in the Regular Army; regiment concurrently broken up and its elements redesignated as follows:

Headquarters and Headquarters Battery as Headquarters and Headquarters Battery, 43rd Artillery Group

1st Battalion consolidated with the 43rd Field Artillery Battalion (see ANNEX 1) and consolidated unit designated as the 43rd Field Artillery Battalion, an element of the 8th Infantry Division

2d Battalion consolidated with the 61st Field Artillery Battalion (active) (see ANNEX 2) and consolidated unit designated as the 61st Field Artillery Battalion, an element of the 1st Cavalry Division

3d Battalion consolidated with the 64th Field Artillery Battalion (active) (see ANNEX 3) and consolidated unit designated as the 64th Field Artillery Battalion, an element of the 25th Infantry Division

After 28 June 1950 the above units underwent changes as follows:

43rd Field Artillery Battalion activated 17 August 1950 at Fort Jackson, South Carolina

Inactivated 1 August 1957 in Germany and relieved from assignment to the 8th Infantry Division

61st Field Artillery Battalion inactivated 15 October 1957 in Japan and relieved from assignment to the 1st Cavalry Division

64th Field Artillery Battalion inactivated 1 February 1957 in Hawaii and relieved from assignment to the 25th Infantry Division

Headquarters and Headquarters Battery, 43d Artillery Group, and the 43rd, 61st, and 64th Field Artillery Battalions consolidated, reorganized, and redesignated August 1958 – July 1959 as the 43rd Artillery, a parent regiment under the Combat Arms Regimental System

Redesignated 1 September 1971 as the 43rd Air Defense Artillery

Withdrawn 16 March 1989 from the Combat Arms Regimental System and reorganized under the United States Army Regimental System

Redesignated 1 October 2005 as the 43rd Air Defense Artillery Regiment

ANNEX 1

Constituted 1 October 1933 in the Regular Army as the 43rd Field Artillery

Redesignated 13 January 1941 as the 43rd Field Artillery Battalion

Assigned 1 June 1941 to the 8th Division (later redesignated as the 8th Infantry Division) and activated at Fort Jackson, South Carolina

Inactivated 20 October 1945 at Fort Leonard Wood, Missouri

ANNEX 2

Constituted 16 December 1940 in the Regular Army as the 61st Field Artillery Battalion

Assigned 3 January 1941 to the 1st Cavalry Division and activated at Fort Bliss, Texas

ANNEX 3

Constituted 26 August 1941 in the Regular Army as the 64th Field Artillery Battalion and assigned to the 25th Infantry Division

Activated 1 October 1941 in Hawaii

== Distinctive unit insignia ==
- Description

A Gold color metal and enamel device 1 5/32 inches (2.9 cm) in height overall consisting of a shield blazoned: Gules, on a bend Or three oozlefinches Vert. Attached above a wreath Or and Gules, an épi Or around and behind a French locomotive affronté Gules. Attached below the shield a Gold scroll inscribed "SUSTINEMUS" in Black letters.

- Symbolism

The shield is red for Artillery. The bend is taken from the arms of Lorraine, which is gold with three golden alerions on a red bend, with the colors reversed. The three oozlefinches are used instead of the alerions. The green oozlefinch was the device on the shoulder patch worn by the railway artillery reserve in France, of which this regiment was a unit. The locomotive and épi show the character of the regiment. The motto translates to "We Support" and alludes to the mission of railway artillery.

- Background

The distinctive unit insignia was originally approved for the 43d Coast Artillery Regiment on 1 February 1937. It was redesignated for the 43d Artillery Regiment on 13 January 1959. The insignia was redesignated for the 43d Air Defense Artillery Regiment effective 1 September 1971. It was amended to correct the symbolism on 17 November 1983.

== Coat of arms ==
=== Blazon ===
- Shield

Gules, on a bend Or three oozlefinches Vert.

- Crest

On a wreath of the colors, Or and Gules, an épi Or around and behind a French locomotive affronté Gules. Motto SUSTINEMUS (We Support).

=== Symbolism ===
- Shield

The shield is red for Artillery. The bend is taken from the arms of Lorraine, which is gold with three golden alerions on a red bend, with the colors reversed. The three oozlefinches are used instead of the alerions. The green oozlefinch was the device on the shoulder patch worn by the railway artillery reserve in France, of which this regiment was a unit.

- Crest

The locomotive and épi show the character of the regiment.

=== Background ===
The coat of arms was originally approved for the 43d Coast Artillery Regiment on 2 March 1929. It was redesignated for the 43d Artillery Regiment on 13 January 1959. The insignia was redesignated for the 43d Air Defense Artillery Regiment effective 1 September 1971. It was amended to correct the blazon and symbolism on 17 November 1983.

== Current configuration ==
- 1st Battalion, 43rd Air Defense Artillery Regiment
- 2nd Battalion, 43rd Air Defense Artillery Regiment
- 3rd Battalion, 43rd Air Defense Artillery Regiment
- 6th Battalion, 43rd Air Defense Artillery Regiment

== Campaign participation credit ==
- World War I: St. Mihiel; Meuse-Argonne; Lorraine 1918
- World War II: Normandy; Northern France; Rhineland; Central Europe; Central Pacific; Guadalcanal; Northern Solomons; New Guinea; Bismarck Archipelago; Leyte (with arrowhead); Luzon
- Korean War: UN Defensive; UN Offensive; CCF Intervention; First UN Counteroffensive; CCF Spring Offensive; UN Summer-Fall Offensive; Second Korean Winter; Korea, Summer-Fall 1952; Third Korean Winter; Korea, Summer 1953
- Southwest Asia: Defense of Saudi Arabia; Liberation and Defense of Kuwait; Cease-Fire
- War on Terrorism: Global War on Terrorism (additional campaigns to be determined)

== Decorations ==
- Presidential Unit Citation (Army), Streamer embroidered GUADALCANAL
- Presidential Unit Citation (Army), Streamer embroidered NAM RIVER
- Presidential Unit Citation (Army), Streamer embroidered PAKCHON, KOREA
- Presidential Unit Citation (Navy), Streamer embroidered WONJU-HWACHON
- Presidential Unit Citation (Navy), Streamer embroidered IRAQ 2003
- Valorous Unit Award, Streamer embroidered SAUDI ARABIA AND BAHRAIN 1991
- Meritorious Unit Commendation (Army), Streamer embroidered SOUTHWEST ASIA 2002–2003
- Meritorious Unit Commendation (Army), Streamer embroidered SOUTHWEST ASIA 2013–2014 * Army Superior Unit Award, Streamer embroidered 1992–1993
- Army Superior Unit Award, Streamer embroidered 1998–1999
- Navy Unit Commendation, Streamer embroidered PANMUNJOM
- Air Force Outstanding Unit Award, Streamer embroidered ALASKA
