= Dave Simmons (linebacker, born 1943) =

American football player (1943–1994)

No. 53
- Position: Linebacker

Personal information
- Born: August 3, 1943; Elizabethtown, Kentucky, U.S.
- Died: November 7, 1994 (aged 51); Chattanooga, Tennessee, U.S.
- Listed height: 6 ft 4 in (1.93 m)
- Listed weight: 245 lb (111 kg)

Career information
- High school: Stephen F. Austin (TX)
- College: Georgia Tech (1961-1964)
- NFL draft: 1965: 2nd round, 26th overall pick
- AFL draft: 1965: 5th round, 40th overall pick

Career history
- St. Louis Cardinals (1965–1966); New Orleans Saints (1967); Dallas Cowboys (1968); Pittsburgh Steelers (1969)*
- * Offseason or practice squad member only

Awards and highlights
- Second-team All-SEC (1963)

Career NFL statistics
- Interceptions: 2
- Stats at Pro Football Reference

David Alan Simmons (August 3, 1943 – November 7, 1994) was a professional American football linebacker in the National Football League (NFL) for the St. Louis Cardinals, New Orleans Saints, and Dallas Cowboys. He played college football at Georgia Tech.

== Early life ==
Simmons attended Stephen F. Austin High School, where he played as a fullback. He accepted a football scholarship from Georgia Tech where he played at center and linebacker.

== Professional career ==
=== St. Louis Cardinals ===
Simmons was selected in the second round (26th overall) of the 1965 NFL draft by the St. Louis Cardinals. He was also selected by the Buffalo Bills in the fifth round (40th overall) of the 1965 AFL draft. He was a backup linebacker and played on special teams. In 1966, he injured his ribs while playing against the Dallas Cowboys in the sixth game of the season and was placed on the injured reserve list.

=== New Orleans Saints ===
He was selected by the New Orleans Saints in the 1967 NFL expansion draft. He was a part of franchise's inaugural season and played in eleven games. On August 15, 1968, he was traded to the Dallas Cowboys in exchange for a fourth round draft choice (#102-Bob Hudspeth).

=== Dallas Cowboys ===
In 1968, after trading the main backup at linebacker Harold Hays, the Dallas Cowboys acquired Simmons and Jackie Burkett for depth purposes. He appeared in 13 games as a backup linebacker. He was released in 1969.

=== Pittsburgh Steelers ===
In 1969, he was claimed off waivers by the Pittsburgh Steelers. He was released on August 11.

== Personal life ==
Simmons was an ordained Baptist minister. He helped to establish King's Arrow Ranch for children in Lumberton, Mississippi. He started his personal ministry in Little Rock, Arkansas. He wrote the books "Dad the Family Coach" with the foreword provided by Tom Landry, "Dad the Family Mentor" with the foreword provided by Howard Hendricks and "Dad the Family Counselor". On November 7, 1994, he died in a one-car accident in Tennessee, while traveling to Atlanta.
