= Heidi V. Brown =

American Army Major General

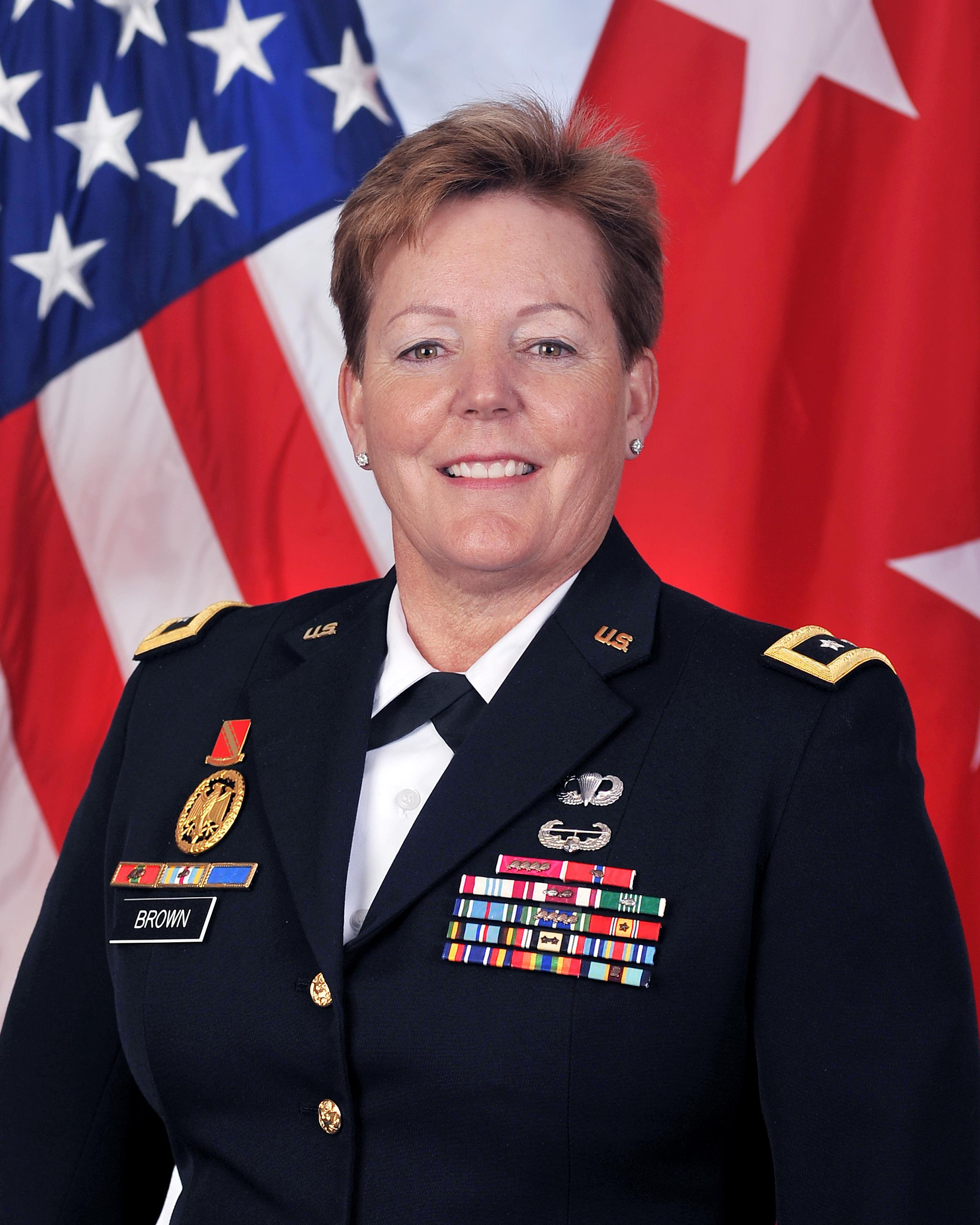
Heidi V. Brown

Heidi Virginia Brown (born 20 July 1959) is a retired U.S. Army Major General who was the first woman to command an air defense battalion and later, in combat, an air defense brigade.

== Biography ==
Born in Texas and raised in El Paso, Brown graduated from Austin High School in 1977. That same year, she was nominated by Congressman Richard Crawford White to the United States Military Academy. In 1981, she graduated from the second West Point class to include women. In 1993, she graduated from the Army Command and General Staff College at Fort Leavenworth. Later, she earned a master's degree in education from the University of South Carolina.

Brown worked at the Pentagon where she developed a computer program to identify demographic profiles of deployed Army units. In September 1997, she returned to Ft. Bliss. She was in charge of a PATRIOT missile battalion in Saudi Arabia and Kuwait in the late 1990s. During this time, when she led the 2-43 Air Defense Artillery Battalion, she became the first woman to command an air defense battalion.

In 2002, Brown became the first woman to command an air defense artillery brigade in the Army. In 2003, she became the first woman to command a brigade, the 31st Air Defense Artillery Brigade, in combat during the Iraq War. In 2008, she took a new assignment in combat support operations. Later she became the director of global operations for the U.S. Strategic Command stationed in Offutt Air Force Base.

Brown retired as an Army Major General in 2017. She retired to Locust Grove, Virginia.
