= Anita Lee Blair =

American politician

Anita Lee Blair (September 8, 1916 – August 25, 2010) was an American politician and activist from Texas. She was the first blind woman elected to any state legislature in the United States.

== Early life and education ==
Anita Lee Blair was born in Oklahoma City, Oklahoma, and raised in El Paso, Texas. She graduated from Austin High School in that city, in 1933. She became blind after a car crash at age 19, in Alamogordo, New Mexico. She earned a B. A. at Texas College of Mines and Metallurgy in 1944, and later completed a master's degree from Texas Women's College, in 1951.

== Career ==
In 1940, Blair became the first person in El Paso to have a service dog, a German shepherd named Fawn. The pair became famous beyond Texas while lecturing on traffic safety and accident prevention. In 1946, Blair and Fawn escaped the fatal La Salle Hotel fire in Chicago; their story highlighted the function of service dogs and was covered in newspapers across the country, and on local television stations in Chicago. In 1950, Blair successfully protested when Fawn was not allowed into the United States Senate gallery with her to attend a debate.

Blair was elected to the Texas House of Representatives in 1952, and served one term. As a state representative, she worked for a pay increase for teachers, for the renovation of the state school for the deaf, and for the right of women to serve on juries. She also co-authored a bill requiring jail sentences for drunk drivers. She lost her bid for re-election in 1954, and in three subsequent elections.

In her later years, Blair was a fixture on local talk radio in El Paso, and at age 86 ran unsuccessfully for county judge. In 2009, she was honored with a Lifetime Achievement BRAVO Award from the League of Women Voters of El Paso.

== Personal life and legacy ==
Blair married Curtis Reynolds Chartier in 1959, in Alamogordo, New Mexico. Blair died in 2010, at age 93. In recognition of her service as a state legislator, her remains were buried in the Texas State Cemetery in Austin.
