= Bill White (comics) =

American animator and illustrator (1961–2012)

- Born: July 15, 1961
- Died: October 27, 2012 (aged 51) Scituate, Massachusetts, U.S.
- Areas: Penciler, Inker, Writer

William W. White, Jr. (July 15, 1961 – October 27, 2012) was an American animator, and a comic book writer, penciller, and inker.

White studied animation under former Disney animator Milt Neil at The Kubert School. He contributed artwork and stories to many comic book publishers, including DC Comics, Marvel Comics, Archie Comics, Harvey Comics, Spotlight Comics, and Walt Disney Publishing. He illustrated the adventures of many famous characters including Donald Duck, Roger Rabbit, The Flintstones, The Jetsons, Scooby-Doo, Richie Rich, Casper the Friendly Ghost, and others. He also had a comic book featuring his own characters, Kaptain Keen and Kompany (Vortex Comics), which ran for six issues and was optioned for television in 1986.

In the animation field, White worked for Spümcø (for the animated series The Ren and Stimpy Show), Walt Disney Feature Animation, and DiC Entertainment (for the animated series Inspector Gadget). He also did extensive work in the advertising and publishing fields and traveled throughout the United States doing caricatures at private parties and corporate events. He had a wife, Sharon, who he often referred to as "Perfect Wifey", and the couple had children.

Bill White died at his home in Scituate, Massachusetts on the evening of October 27, 2012. The cause of death was not disclosed, but according to his personal blog White had been suffering from a series of pancreatic problems for the two years prior to his death.
