= Kimie Yanagawa =

American educator

Kimie Yanagawa Sanematsu (Tokuyama) (January 1, 1915 - August 23, 1997) was an American academic. In 1953 she was the first Japanese person to be naturalized in the United States since 1922, and the first in El Paso, Texas. News from the time period also stated that she was the first Japanese woman to be naturalized in the United States under the McCarran immigration act.

== Biography ==
Yanagawa left Tokyo when she was six and her family moved to Oakland, California. After two years in California, she and her family moved to El Paso, Texas. Her father was a physician. She went to Crockett School, where she commenced in 1928. When she was 16, she spent a year in Tokyo and then she and her family came back to El Paso. She was a salutatorian graduate of Austin High School in 1932. Yanagawa earned a scholarship to attend Mills College, where she planned to major in music. Her graduation from Mills was planned for June 1937. She was inducted into Phi Beta Kappa. In 1939, she married Shunichi S. Tokuyama, a physician. It was an arranged marriage, and it eventually ended in divorce. Yanagawa went on to Texas Western College and earned her master's degree in education in 1948. After graduating, she began teaching at Franklin Elementary.

In 1948, Yanagawa declared her intention to become a United States citizen, even though Japanese people were often excluded from citizenship. In 1953, she became the first Japanese woman in the United States and the first Japanese person in El Paso to become a naturalized United States citizen. Yanagawa benefited from the passage of the McCarran immigration act, which allowed Japanese immigrants to become citizens of the U.S. At her citizenship ceremony, she had her full name to shortened, dropping Tokuyama from her name. That same year, Yanagawa moved to Tacoma, Washington.

In 1960, she met Ben Sanematsu at the University of San Francisco where they were both taking special education classes. Sanematsu was blind, so Yanagawa offered to read some of the assignments for him. Later that year on December 20, they were married. In 1962, the couple began to travel across the country.

Yanagawa had a stroke in 1993 and lived in a nursing facility until her death in 1997. She was buried at Oak Hill Cemetery. After her death, her husband, Sanematsu, created a scholarship in her honor. The scholarship now memorializes both of them.
