= Mighty Mouse =

American animated anthropomorphic superhero mouse

- Terrytoons character
- Mighty Mouse, as appeared in the 1940s theatrical shorts made by the Terrytoons studio for 20th Century Fox
- First appearance: Mouse of Tomorrow (1942)
- Created by: Paul Terry; Isadore Klein
- Voiced by: Roy Halee (theatrical cartoons, singing); Allen Swift (Mighty Mouse's First Adventures); Tom Morrison (theatrical cartoons, speaking); Alan Oppenheimer (The New Adventures of Mighty Mouse and Heckle & Jeckle); Patrick Pinney (Mighty Mouse: The New Adventures)

In-universe information
- Species: Mouse
- Gender: Male

Mighty Mouse is an American animated character created by the Terrytoons studio for 20th Century Fox. He is an anthropomorphic superhero mouse, originally called Super Mouse, who made his debut in the 1942 short The Mouse of Tomorrow. The character's name was changed to Mighty Mouse in his eighth film, 1944's The Wreck of the Hesperus, and the character went on to star in 80 theatrical shorts, concluding in 1961 with Cat Alarm.

In 1955, Mighty Mouse Playhouse debuted as a Saturday morning cartoon show on the CBS television network, which popularized the character far more than the original theatrical run. The show lasted until 1967. Filmation revived the character in The New Adventures of Mighty Mouse and Heckle & Jeckle, which ran from 1979 to 1980, and animation director Ralph Bakshi revived the concept again in Mighty Mouse: The New Adventures, from 1987 to 1988.

Mighty Mouse also appeared in comic books by several publishers, including his own series, Mighty Mouse and The Adventures of Mighty Mouse, which ran from 1946 to 1968.

Mighty Mouse is known for his theme song, "Mighty Mouse Theme (Here I Come to Save the Day)", written by composer Marshall Barer.

== History ==
=== Super Mouse ===
The character originated in 1942 from an idea by animator Isadore Klein at the Terrytoons studio, who suggested a parody/homage to the popular Superman character, making some sketches of a superhero fly. Paul Terry, the head of the studio, liked the idea but suggested a mouse rather than an insect.

The character was dubbed "Super Mouse", and his first theatrical short, The Mouse of Tomorrow, debuted on October 16, 1942.

In his book Of Mice and Magic, critic Leonard Maltin describes the character's origin story:

Cats of the city have imposed a reign of terror on the rodent community. The mice have barely a chance to live in peace, with endless traps and clever feline footwork sealing their doom. One mouse manages to escape from a particularly hungry cat and runs for shelter into an enormous supermarket. He examines the goods on the long lines of shelves and sets to work on a total transformation: He bathes in Super Soap, swallows Super Soup, munches Super Celery and plunges head first into an enormous piece of Super Cheese -- from which he emerges in a flash as Super Mouse! He's no longer a tiny rodent, but a two-footed, humanized mouse with a massive chest and powerful biceps. His costume is like Superman's, with a flowing red cape, and his powers are similar, too: He can fly through the air and repel bullets with his chest. Super Mouse soars to the rescue of his fellow mice and dispatches the neighborhood cats to the moon. Returning to earth, he is hoisted on the shoulders of his happy comrades, as the narrator declares, "Thus ends the adventure of Super Mouse... he seen his job and he done it!"

The trade journal Variety said The Mouse of Tomorrow "just misses being outstanding, mainly because of faulty narration and too much kidding of Superman. Idea of super-rat conquering prowling beasts of feline world is good, but too closely follows pattern of that super hero."

Super Mouse, and later Mighty Mouse, was originally voiced by Roy Halee Sr., a tenor who often sang on radio and first started doing cartoon voices for J. R. Bray's studio. In the operatic melodramas to follow, Halee and his quartet provided all of the vocals.

In Super Mouse's next film, he spoofed the popular Universal Monsters films (Frankenstein's Cat, 1942). In Pandora's Box (1943), he battled bat-winged cat demons, and his origin story was changed: now he becomes Super Mouse by eating vitamins A through Z. The hero made seven films in 1942–1943 before his name was changed.

=== Mighty Mouse: rename and redesign ===
Mighty Mouse, as the character originally appeared, wearing a costume reminiscent of Superman's.

In 1944, Paul Terry learned that another character named "Super Mouse" was to be published in Standard Comics' Coo-Coo Comics, so his character's name was changed to Mighty Mouse. The first short under the character's new name was The Wreck of the Hesperus, released February 11, 1944, adapting the celebrated poem by Henry Wadsworth Longfellow with the addition of a superhero mouse. A couple months later, the studio spoofed another classic, Robert Louis Stevenson's Strange Case of Dr Jekyll and Mr Hyde, under the title Mighty Mouse Meets Jeckyll and Hyde Cat.

By summer, Mighty Mouse's costume got an overhaul as well. Until this point, he'd been wearing Superman's colors—a blue costume with a red cape—but in the June 16, 1944, cartoon Eliza on the Ice, Mighty Mouse appears for the first time in a red costume, with a yellow cape. This is also the first time that the character was portrayed as living among the stars, hurtling down from the heavens to save the day.

The final design of the character debuted in the 15th cartoon, The Sultan's Birthday, released on October 13, 1944. In this cartoon, redesigned by animator Connie Rasinski, Mighty Mouse has a fuller figure with an exaggerated upper body, and is clad in a yellow outfit, with a red cape and trunks.

Like his inspiration, Superman, Mighty Mouse's superpowers are vast and sometimes appear limitless. His main powers include flight, super-strength and invulnerability. The early cartoons often portray him as a ruthless fighter; one of his most frequent tactics is to fly under an enemy's chin and let loose a volley of blows, subduing the opponent through sheer physical punishment.

However, his powers can vary, depending on the demands of the story; he is sometimes knocked unconscious or rendered temporarily immobile by the villain, only to rise again by the end of the cartoon and save the day. In some films, he uses X-ray vision and psychokinesis. He was also able to turn back time in 1946's The Johnstown Flood. Other cartoons, like 1945's Krakatoa, show him leaving a red contrail during flight that he can manipulate like a band of solid, flexible matter. In several of the cartoons, when Mighty Mouse achieves the impossible feats, the narrator exclaims, first in a normal voice: "What a mouse!!!!!", followed by his louder triumphant voice: "WHAT A MOUSE!!!!!"

In a 1969 interview, Terry said that Mighty Mouse's power had a religious aspect: "When a man is sick, or down, or hurt, you say, 'There's nothing more we can do. It's in God's hand.' And he either survives or he doesn't according to God's plan. Right? So, 'Man's extremity is God's opportunity.' So, taking that as a basis, I'd only have to get the mice in a tough spot and then say, 'Isn't there someone who can help?' 'Yes, there is someone; it's Mighty Mouse!' So, down from the heavens he'd come sailing down and lick the evil spirit, or whatever it was. And everything would be serene again." Biographer W. Gerald Harmonic notes that as of the mid 40s, Mighty Mouse would be pictured living on a star or a cloud, up in the heavens, and that he became "a Christ-like figure, a savior of all 'mouse-kind'."

While his typical opponents are nondescript cats, Mighty Mouse occasionally battles specific villains, though most appear in only one or two films. Several of the earliest "Super Mouse" films, which were made during World War II, feature the cats as thinly veiled caricatures of the Nazis, hunting down mice and marching them into concentration camp–like traps to what would otherwise be their doom. The Bat-cats, alien cats with bat wings and wheels for feet, appeared in two cartoons; in two others between 1949 and 1950 he faces a huge, dim-witted, but super-strong cat named Julius "Pinhead" Schlabotka (voiced by Dayton Allen) whose strength rivals Mighty Mouse's. In rare moments, he confronts non-feline adversaries such as human villain Bad Bill Bunion and his horse, or the Automatic Mouse Trap, a brontosaur-shaped robotic monster. In The Green Line (1944), the cats and the mice live on either side of a green dividing line down the middle of their town's main street. They agree to keep the peace as long as no one crosses it. An evil entity, a Satan cat, starts the cats and mice fighting. At the end, Mighty Mouse is cheered by mice and cats alike.

=== Melodrama spoofs ===
In 1945, Mighty Mouse and the Pirates was the first Mighty Mouse cartoon to feature sung dialogue, in the operetta style. Gypsy Life (1945) and The Crackpot King (1946) followed in the same style. Gypsy Life was particularly successful, earning Terry his third nomination for an Academy Award for Short Subjects (Cartoon).

There was a romantic, damsel in distress element in these cartoons—in each one, Mighty Mouse saves a dark-haired beauty from terrible trouble, and in the latter two, the camera fades out on the hero and the girl in a romantic clinch. While these were very similar to the musical melodrama spoofs that were soon to emerge, they didn't have an overwrought narrator, or the suggestion that the cartoon is an episode of a continuing story.

In November 1947, A Fight to the Finish was the first in a series of musical melodrama spoofs, with Mighty Mouse saving damsel in distress Pearl Pureheart (sometimes "Little Nell") from the villainous, mustache-twirling cat Oil Can Harry. Terrytoons revived the concept from their earlier Fanny Zilch series, a melodrama spoof that ran for seven cartoons from 1933 to 1937. Fanny was constantly tormented by a human version of Oil Can Harry, and protected by her lover, J. Leffingwell Strongheart.

A Fight to the Finish begins with a snatch of Cole Porter's song "And The Villain Still Pursued Her", which had also been used as the theme for the Fanny Zilch cartoons. The narrator opens with an urgent recap of the (nonexistent) previous episode: "In our last episode, we left Mighty Mouse at the old Beaver River station. As you remember, folks, he was locked in a desperate struggle with a villain. But on with the story..." Mighty Mouse is engaging in "a fight to the finish" with Oil Can Harry, now a villainous cat with a mustache, a top hat and a big black cloak, voiced by Tom Morrison. The blonde heroine, Pearl Pureheart, is tied up in the other room, but refuses to give up hope. Harry manages to knock out Mighty Mouse, and leaves him tied to the railroad track with a bomb on his head, and the 5:15 train due to pass by. Harry drives Pearl away to his home, where he woos her in song, to no avail. Mighty Mouse manages to blow out the fuse, stop the train and escape from his bonds, and rushes to Pearl's rescue. At Harry's house, they fight with fists, guns and swords, as Pearl slips out the window and onto a passing log which is floating down the river into a mill. Mighty Mouse throws Harry into the river and rushes to rescue Pearl, who's heading for the buzzsaw. The narrator asks, "Is our little heroine doomed to destruction in the sawmill? Will Mighty Mouse arrive in time? See the following episode, next week!" The camera starts to iris out, but then stops, as the narrator relents, "Stop! Gosh, we can't wait until next week. Please, show us what happens, won't you?" Mighty Mouse grabs Pearl in time, and the pair have a brief romantic chorus together as the cartoon delivers a happy ending.

The melodrama spoofs continued as an occasional series over the next six years, with Oil Can Harry and Pearl Pureheart returning in thirteen more cartoons. Another memorable short was 1949's The Perils of Pearl Pureheart, in which Oil Can Harry hypnotizes Pearl into singing "Carry Me Back to Old Virginny" on stage at an old saloon, where he vacuums up the tips thrown by the audience. Hypnotized for three and a half minutes of the six-minute cartoon, Pearl continues to sing as the battle between Harry and Mighty Mouse rages around her, even underwater.

To vary the formula, the melodramas started traveling to exotic locales, including Italy (Sunny Italy, 1951), Switzerland (Swiss Miss, 1951), Holland (Happy Holland, 1952) and even prehistoric times (Prehistoric Perils, 1952) and medieval times (When Mousehood Was in Flower, 1953).

The fourteen Oil Can Harry melodrama theatricals were:

- A Fight to the Finish (1947)
- Loves Labor Won (1948)
- The Mysterious Stranger (1948)
- Triple Trouble (1948)
- A Cold Romance (1949)
- The Perils of Pearl Pureheart (1949)
- Stop, Look and Listen (1949)
- Beauty on the Beach (1950)
- Sunny Italy (1951)
- Swiss Miss (1951)
- Prehistoric Perils (1952)
- Happy Holland (1952)
- A Soapy Opera (1953)
- When Mousehood Was in Flower (1953)

=== Television ===
==== Mighty Mouse Playhouse ====
Mighty Mouse had little theatrical impact, but became Terrytoons' most popular character and a cultural icon on television. In 1955, Paul Terry sold the Terrytoons studio to CBS, which repackaged the theatrical cartoons as a popular Saturday morning show, Mighty Mouse Playhouse. The show aired from December 1955 through September 1967, using the existing film library. Only three new cartoons were produced after the sale. The final season also included a new feature, entitled The Mighty Heroes.

Tom Morrison of Terrytoons provided the speaking voice of Mighty Mouse in the show's new framing sequences.

The show's theme song was credited on some early records to "The Terrytooners, Mitch Miller and Orchestra". However, writer Mark Evanier credits a group called The Sandpipers (not the 1960s easy listening group of the same name).

==== The New Adventures of Mighty Mouse and Heckle & Jeckle ====
In 1979–1980, Filmation made television cartoons starring Mighty Mouse and fellow Terrytoon characters Heckle and Jeckle in a show called The New Adventures of Mighty Mouse and Heckle & Jeckle. The show introduced two new characters: a vampire duck named Quacula, and Oil Can Harry's bumbling, large, but swift-running, henchman Swifty. The show premiered in 1979 and lasted two seasons. In the Filmation series and movie, Mighty Mouse and Oil Can Harry were performed by veteran voice artist Alan Oppenheimer, and Pearl Pureheart was voiced by Diane Pershing. Frank Welker played Heckle, Jeckle and Quacula, and Norm Prescott played Theodore H. Bear.

Each episode included two traditional Mighty Mouse cartoons, as well as an episode of a Mighty Mouse science-fiction serial, "The Great Space Chase". The hour was rounded out with two Heckle & Jeckle cartoons and one Quacula cartoon, plus short bumpers with tips about safety and the environment. The total cartoons produced for the series were 32 Mighty Mouse cartoons, 32 Heckle & Jeckle cartoons, 16 episodes of "The Great Space Chase" and 16 Quacula cartoons.

The "Space Chase" episodes were edited together into a theatrical matinee movie, Mighty Mouse in the Great Space Chase, which was released on December 10, 1982.

==== Mighty Mouse: The New Adventures ====
In 1987 and 1988, animation producer Ralph Bakshi – who began his career at Terrytoons in the late 1950s and worked on the last Mighty Mouse shorts filmed by that company – created a new series of heavily stylized Mighty Mouse cartoons entitled Mighty Mouse: The New Adventures for the CBS Saturday morning children's lineup. In this series, Mighty Mouse has a real identity, Mike Mouse (both identities voiced by Patrick Pinney), and a sidekick, Scrappy Mouse (voiced by actress Dana Hill), the little orphan. Though a children's cartoon, its heavy satirical tone, risqué humor and adult jokes made the Bakshi Mighty Mouse series a collector's item for collectors of older television series.

The best-remembered episode of this series featured a crossover with Mighty Mouse and another Bakshi creation, the Mighty Heroes (Strong Man, Tornado Man, Rope Man, Cuckoo Man and Diaper Man). In the 1988 episode "Heroes and Zeroes", the Mighty Heroes were middle-aged men (except for Diaper Man, who was 36) and were all accountants with the firm of Man, Man, Man, Man, and Man.

==== Later years ====
Marvel Comics produced a 10-issue comic book series (set in the New Adventures continuity) in 1990 and 1991. Since then, little else new has been produced using the Mighty Mouse character except for a 2001 "The power of cheese" television commercial. That commercial shows Mighty Mouse dining calmly on cheese in a restaurant, utterly unconcerned with a scene of chaos and terror visibly unfolding in the street outside. The commercial was later removed from air following the September 11 attacks.

The character appeared in the 1999 pilot Curbside, voiced by Dee Bradley Baker.

Until 2019, the rights to Mighty Mouse were divided as a result of the 2006 corporate split of Viacom (the former owner of the Terrytoons franchise) into two separate companies. CBS Operations (a unit of the CBS Corporation) owned the ancillary rights and trademarks to the character, while Paramount Home Entertainment/CBS Home Entertainment held home video rights. The first official release of Mighty Mouse material has been announced and what is now CBS Media Ventures has television syndication rights (the shorts are currently out of circulation). On December 4, 2019, CBS Corporation and Viacom re-merged into a single entity, ViacomCBS, officially reuniting the rights to Mighty Mouse within the same company.

In 2017, during his 75th anniversary, Mighty Mouse made his return with a five-issue comic book series produced by Dynamite Entertainment.

On October 16, 2025, it was announced that Mighty Mouse would be coming back to television after decades, joined by others in the Terrytoons library, under the title Mighty Mouse and Friends, airing on MeTV Toons on Sundays starting November 2, 2025. On November 10, 2025, just one week after the airing of Mighty Mouse and Friends, he and other Terrytoons characters then appeared on MeTV as part of the weekday morning block Toon In with Me.

=== Feature film adaptation ===
As early as 2004, Paramount Pictures and Nickelodeon Movies announced their intention to bring Mighty Mouse back to the motion picture screen with a CGI Mighty Mouse feature film that was tentatively scheduled to be released some time in 2013.

In April 2019, Jon and Erich Hoeber signed on to script the film for Paramount Animation while Karen Rosenfelt (Wonder Park) and Robert Cort (Terminator Genisys) are set to produce. The film will be a live action/animated production. In November 2024, it was announced Matt Lieberman took over as the writer for the film with Ryan Reynolds as the producer and the voice of Mighty Mouse.

== Terrytoons theatrical shorts ==
The first seven films starred the character named Super Mouse. In these early films the character's costume is much closer in design to that of Superman (blue tunic and tights with red trunks and cape).

No.	Title	Directed by	Written by	Produced by	Original release date
1	"The Mouse of Tomorrow"	Eddie Donnelly	John Foster, Isadore Klein	Paul Terry	October 16, 1942
In Mouseville, the town's cats capture all the mice except one, who escapes to a Supermarket, where he uses Super Soap, and eats Super Celery and Super Cheese, transforming into Super Mouse, who then vanquishes the cats and saves the mice of Mouseville.
2	"Frankenstein's Cat"	Manny Davis	John Foster	Bill Weiss	November 27, 1942
Super Mouse must rescue the mice from a monster cat brought to life by a strike of lightning.
3	"He Dood It Again"	Eddie Donnelly	John Foster	Paul Terry	February 5, 1943
Super Mouse protects a group of mice who like to eat and party at a local diner at night.
4	"Pandora's Box"	Connie Rasinski	John Foster	Paul Terry	June 11, 1943
Greek mythology provides the background as Super Mouse must battle bat-like cats to save a female mouse from the Troubles she unleashes from a box mysteriously dropped from the sky.
5	"Super Mouse Rides Again"	Mannie Davis	John Foster	Paul Terry	August 6, 1943
Cats battle a group of mice with everything imaginable (including Tommy guns) that only Super Mouse can thwart.
6	"Down with Cats"	Connie Rasinski	John Foster	Paul Terry	October 7, 1943
Super Mouse comes to the rescue of some mice enjoying winter sports. The influence of World War II is evident in this film.
7	"The Lion and the Mouse"	Mannie Davis	John Foster	Paul Terry	November 12, 1943
Aesop's tale is reborn as Super Mouse faces a lion. (Technicolor)

In the eighth cartoon, the character's name was changed to Mighty Mouse.

No.	Title	Directed by	Written by	Produced by	Original release date
8	"The Wreck of the Hesperus"	Mannie Davis	John Foster	Paul Terry	February 11, 1944
An old captain and his daughter are caught at sea in a hurricane. Mighty Mouse saves the captain, his daughter and the ship's crew and receives a hero's tickertape parade.
9	"The Champion of Justice"	Manny Davis	John Foster	Bill Weiss	March 17, 1944
An elderly couple dies and leaves their fortune to some mice who had befriended them. Willy the Spender, the nephew of the couple, vows to get the money away from the mice. (NOTE: The villain in this film is a human, rather than the usual cat. Also, Mighty Mouse uses a gun in the course of fighting the villain.)
10	"Mighty Mouse Meets Jekyll and Hyde Cat"	Manny Davis	John Foster	Paul Terry	April 28, 1944
Mighty Mouse rescues a group of mice who sought shelter from a storm but accidentally hid away in the laboratory of Dr. Jekyll and are threatened by his cat who has taken the Doctor's horrific formula.
11	"Eliza on the Ice"	Connie Rasinski	John Foster	Paul Terry	June 16, 1944
Mighty Mouse has to save Eliza from the clutches of Simon Legree in this story with characters named after those in Uncle Tom's Cabin. (Technicolor)
12	"Wolf! Wolf!"	Mannie Davis	John Foster	Paul Terry	June 22, 1944
Little Bo Peep and her sheep are the victims in this story that tips the hat to the Pied Piper of Hamelin as Mighty Mouse goes up against the wolves with a jazz soundtrack.
13	"The Green Line"	Eddie Donnelly	John Foster	Paul Terry	July 7, 1944
Mice and cats live in relative peace in a town divided in half by a green line until an evil spirit convinces the cats to cross the line. Mighty Mouse puts everything back to normal again after dealing with the evil spirit.
14	"Mighty Mouse and the Two Barbers"	Eddie Donnelly	John Foster	Paul Terry	September 1, 1944
In Terrytown, there are two barbershops (one for the mice and one for the men). A gang of alley cats arrive to cause trouble for both of them until Mighty Mouse arrives to set things straight.
15	"Sultan's Birthday"	Bill Tytla	John Foster	Paul Terry	October 13, 1944
World War II mixes with The Arabian Nights as Mighty Mouse rescues a sultan's harem girl from the attack of cats on flying carpets.
16	"At the Circus"	Eddie Donnelly	John Foster	Paul Terry	November 17, 1944
Mighty Mouse flies to the circus this time to rescue the cute high wire performer from the escaped lions.
17	"Mighty Mouse and the Pirates"	Mannie Davis	John Foster	Paul Terry	January 12, 1945
Pirate cats capture an island mouse princess who Mighty Mouse must rescue.
18	"The Port of Missing Mice"	Eddie Donnelly	John Foster	Paul Terry	February 2, 1945
More pirate cats, this time in San Francisco as Mighty Mouse battles cats to save a group of sailor mice from their clutches.
19	"Raiding the Raiders"	Connie Rasinski	John Foster	Paul Terry	March 9, 1945
Rabbits are the victims this time, and vultures are the villains that Mighty Mouse must vanquish.
20	"The Kilkenny Cats"	Mannie Davis	John Foster	Paul Terry	April 13, 1945
City mice are forced to battle a gang of cats with military weapons, until Mighty Mouse arrives to save the day.
21	"The Silver Streak"	Eddie Donnelly	John Foster	Paul Terry	June 8, 1945
Mice living in an old shack are safe under the protection of their dog, until the cats capture the dog and leave him on the train tracks as the Silver Streak bears down on him. Only Mighty Mouse can save everyone concerned while teaching the cats a lesson.
22	"Mighty Mouse and the Wolf"	Eddie Donnelly	John Foster	Paul Terry	July 20, 1945
Three fairy tales are inverted as the Wolf tries to show how he takes all the blame unjustly. Spoofs Red Riding Hood, Little Bo Peep and the Three Little Pigs just to let Mighty Mouse take out the Wolf three times.
23	"Gypsy Life"	Connie Rasinski	John Foster	Paul Terry	August 3, 1945
The bat-cats are back. This time they kidnap a gypsy girl whom Mighty Mouse must rescue while putting the bat-cats in their place.
24	"Mighty Mouse Meets Bad Bill Bunion"	Mannie Davis	John Foster	Paul Terry	November 9, 1945
Mighty Mouse must save the saloon gal singer from the clutches of the outlaw Bad Bill Bunion.
25	"Krakatoa"	Connie Rasinski	John Foster	Paul Terry	December 14, 1945
Dancing mouse Krakatoa Katie offends the island volcano which spews lava to punish the mice. A signal for help is received by a scientist, who drinks a potion and changes (a la Jekyll/Hyde) into Mighty Mouse who must stop the volcano's threat and set the island aright.
26	"Svengali's Cat"	Eddie Donnelly	John Foster	Paul Terry	January 8, 1946
A hypnotist cat forces a girl mouse to act as bait to lure other mice to be captured and eaten by the cats until Mighty Mouse comes to the rescue.
27	"The Wicked Wolf"	Mannie Davis	John Foster	Paul Terry	March 8, 1946
Goldilocks and the Three Bears get mixed in with the Wolf as Mighty Mouse must set everything right.
28	"My Old Kentucky Home"	Eddie Donnelly	John Foster	Paul Terry	March 29, 1946
Humans are the recipients of Mighty Mouse's help this time when the Wolf comes to collect the mortgage on the home of The Colonel and Nellie. A jockey promises to win the horse race and use the money to pay the mortgage. The Wolf plans to prevent the jockey from winning, but Mighty Mouse won't let that happen.
29	"Throwing the Bull"	Connie Rasinski	John Foster	Paul Terry	May 3, 1946
A wealthy Spanish merchant offers a reward and marriage to his daughter to anyone who can defeat a bull. All comers fail, until Mighty Mouse enters the ring to win the fight and the merchant's daughter.
30	"The Johnstown Flood"	Connie Rasinski	John Foster	Paul Terry	June 28, 1946
In a re-imagining of the Johnstown Flood, mice and dogs are caught in the devastating deluge as Mighty Mouse battles to rescue them while averting further disaster.
31	"The Trojan Horse"	Mannie Davis	John Foster	Paul Terry	July 26, 1946
A return to mythology, this time Troy (the mouse version) where the unsuspecting rodents take in a horse statue which hides cats within waiting to pounce. Mighty Mouse descends from Mount Olympus to save the day.
32	"Winning the West"	Eddie Donnelly	John Foster	Paul Terry	August 16, 1946
American myth sets the stage this time as Mighty Mouse turns up in the old west to battle cats threatening pioneer mice.
33	"The Electronic Mouse Trap"	Mannie Davis	John Foster	Paul Terry	September 6, 1946
An evil scientist cat invents a robot mouse trap that goes after all the mice in the city. The Atomic Age begins to make its presence known as Mighty Mouse must battle a robot powered by atomic bombs.
34	"The Jail Break"	Eddie Donnelly	John Foster	Paul Terry	September 20, 1946
Another story set in the classic American west. This time, Bad Bill Bunion returns to commit crimes until Mighty Mouse defeats him and send him back to prison at Alcatraz Island.
35	"The Crackpot King"	Eddie Donnelly	John Foster	Paul Terry	November 15, 1946
Mighty Mouse must battle the insane cat king and his evil wolf wizard to rescue Susette, the fair damsel mouse in distress.
36	"Mighty Mouse and the Hep Cat"	Mannie Davis	John Foster	Paul Terry	December 6, 1946
The fairy tale theme returns as a city of well-to-do suburban mice are lured to their demise by cats using the magic flute of the Pied Piper of Hamelin. Mighty Mouse must help the mice who cannot help themselves.
37	"Crying Wolf"	Connie Rasinski	John Foster	Paul Terry	January 10, 1947
A faithful sheepdog cares for the lambs under his care, but it's always the black sheep of the family that causes the problems and needs the help of Mighty Mouse when his practical jokes go awry.
38	"The Dead End Cats"	Eddie Donnelly	John Foster	Paul Terry	February 14, 1947
Mighty Mouse must face down a 1930s-style mob of racketeer cats.
39	"Aladdin's Lamp"	Eddie Donnelly	John Foster	Paul Terry	March 28, 1947
The Arabian Nights return as Mighty Mouse becomes involved with rescuing the daughter of Aladdin in this retelling of the story.
40	"The Sky Is Falling"	Mannie Davis	John Foster	Paul Terry	April 25, 1947
Mighty Mouse rescues some barnyard animals who have been tricked by the fox into believing the sky is falling.
41	"Mighty Mouse Meets Deadeye Dick"	Connie Rasinski	John Foster	Paul Terry	May 30, 1947
Back to the American western as the sheriff and the bad guy battle it out until Mighty Mouse arrives to finish the fight.
42	"A Date for Dinner"	Eddie Donnelly	John Foster	Paul Terry	August 29, 1947
A game of cat and mouse, until the cat catches the mouse. The mouse makes a promise to deliver an even better mouse if the cat will release him. When the mouse returns, dinner is...Mighty Mouse.
43	"The First Snow"	Mannie Davis	John Foster	Paul Terry	October 10, 1947
In the winter, the rabbits are enjoying life when a fox shows up. They can handle him for a while, but when the baby bunnies are threatened, only Mighty Mouse can save the day.
44	"A Fight to the Finish"	Connie Rasinski	John Foster	Paul Terry	November 14, 1947
The spoofs of serial cliffhanger films begin as Oil Can Harry threatens Pearl Pureheart and Mighty Mouse must come to the rescue.
45	"Swiss Cheese Family Robinson"	Mannie Davis	John Foster	Paul Terry	December 19, 1947
Even superheroes need time off, and as the mouse version of The Swiss Family Robinson gets underway Mighty Mouse is enjoying a vacation on a beach somewhere. The Robinsons send a note in a bottle for help, which finds its way to Mighty Mouse and he quickly returns from vacation to save the mice.
46	"Lazy Little Beaver"	Eddie Donnelly	John Foster	Paul Terry	December 26, 1947
A young beaver runs away from home but soon discovers the world can be an unsafe place. Fortunately, Mighty Mouse will help him learn a lesson about work and sloth, safely.
47	"Mighty Mouse and the Magician"	Eddie Donnelly	John Foster	Paul Terry	March 27, 1948
A mouse village magician's show is interrupted by an invasion of cats. The magician bravely tries to hold off the cats, but they gain his wand and become invisible. Only Mighty Mouse with his powers can rout the cats and save the mice.
48	"The Feudin' Hillbillies"	Connie Rasinski	John Foster	Paul Terry	June 23, 1948
Mighty Mouse must settle a clan feud between the cats and the mice.
49	"The Witch's Cat"	Mannie Davis	John Foster	Paul Terry	July 15, 1948
A mouse Halloween party attracts a witch and her cat. Mighty Mouse, it seems, can be poisoned, but is revived by the rain to finish the job.
50	"Loves Labor Won"	Mannie Davis	John Foster	Paul Terry	September 15, 1948
Another operatic cliffhanger serial spoof with Oil Can Harry and Pearl Pureheart. (Technicolor)
51	"Triple Trouble"	Eddie Donnelly	John Foster	Paul Terry	September 30, 1948
Another serial cliffhanger sets the stage as Mighty Mouse faces vultures while Oil Can Harry threatens the Colonel and kidnaps Pearl Pureheart. (Technicolor)
52	"The Magic Slipper"	Mannie Davis	John Foster	Paul Terry	December 2, 1948
Cinderella is the framework for this retelling, with a wolf who might resemble Oil Can Harry and Pearl Pureheart as Cinderella. Of course, Mighty Mouse will set everything as it should be by the end of the story.
53	"The Mysterious Stranger"	Mannie Davis	John Foster	Paul Terry	December 21, 1948
A mortgage is at stake, but this time Oil Can Harry holds the deed to a circus, and wants the hand of Nell, the highwire performer. But everything Harry tries is foiled by a mysterious stranger in a trenchcoat. Who is that masked man?
54	"The Racket Buster"	Mannie Davis	John Foster, Tom Morrison	Paul Terry	December 26, 1948
Gangster cats return to threaten Mighty Mouse and Pearl Pureheart.
55	"A Cold Romance"	Mannie Davis	John Foster	Paul Terry	April 10, 1949
It's the return of Little Nell this time, with Oil Can Harry as the villain against Mighty Mouse set at the North Pole.
56	"The Catnip Gang"	Eddie Donnelly	John Foster	Paul Terry	July 22, 1949
Mighty Mouse battles the Catnip Gang, a group of cats that have escaped from jail.
57	"The Perils of Pearl Pureheart"	Eddie Donnelly	John Foster	Paul Terry	October 11, 1949
Oil Can Harry and Pearl Pureheart return, with Harry hypnotizing Pearl to sing at his saloon.
58	"Stop, Look and Listen"	Eddie Donnelly	Unknown	Paul Terry	December 1, 1949
Another melodrama operetta, with Oil Can Harry having tied Pearl Pureheart to the horns of a rampaging bull and Mighty Mouse to its tail as they are chased by a locomotive.
59	"Comic Book Land"	Mannie Davis	John Foster	Paul Terry	January 1, 1950
In this Sourpuss/Gandy Goose cartoon, Mighty Mouse puts in a guest appearance by flying out of a Mighty Mouse comic book, within a dream, to save the day. (Technicolor)
60	"Anti-Cats"	Mannie Davis	Unknown	Paul Terry	March 1, 1950
To avoid a winter storm, a group of mice take refuge in a home with a hungry cat. Mighty Mouse dons his trenchcoat disguise to cause the cat no end of grief.
61	"Law and Order"	Eddie Donnelly	Unknown	Paul Terry	June 23, 1950
Mighty Mouse rescues mice being sold as frozen treats by a gang of cats. (Technicolor)
62	"Beauty on the Beach"	Connie Rasinski	Unknown	Paul Terry	November 1, 1950
Mighty Mouse faces down Oil Can Harry for the safety of Pearl Pureheart in an amusement park.
63	"Mother Goose's Birthday Party"	Connie Rasinski	Unknown	Paul Terry	December 1, 1950
All of Mother Goose's characters give her a party of honor, but when the Big Bad Wolf appears, only Mighty Mouse can save the party.
64	"Sunny Italy"	Connie Rasinski	Unknown	Paul Terry	March 1, 1951
Mighty Mouse and Oil Can Harry battle all across Italian history and geography for the affections of sweet Pearl Pureheart.
65	"Goons from the Moon"	Connie Rasinski	Unknown	Paul Terry	April 1, 1951
Science fiction arrives with alien cats and bat-cats that want to capture the mice of TerryTown.
66	"Injun Trouble"	Eddie Donnelly	Unknown	Paul Terry	June 1, 1951
The Colonel has mortgage trouble again, and sets out to strike it rich in gold to pay it off, but it never works out. Mighty Mouse will again rescue the Colonel. (Technicolor)
67	"A Swiss Miss"	Mannie Davis	Unknown	Paul Terry	August 1, 1951
Another cliffhanger (literally) as Oil Can Harry threatens Pearl Pureheart in the Swiss Alps.
68	"A Cat's Tale"	Mannie Davis	Unknown	Paul Terry	November 1, 1951
A cat narrates this origin story about Mighty Mouse.
69	"Prehistoric Perils"	Connie Rasinski	Unknown	Paul Terry	March 1, 1952
Mighty Mouse, Oil Can Harry, and Pearl Pureheart time travel back to prehistoric times. (Technicolor)
70	"Hansel and Gretel"	Connie Rasinski	John Foster	Paul Terry	June 1, 1952
Mighty Mouse battles the witch and her cat to save mouse versions of Hansel and Gretel.
71	"Happy Holland"	Eddie Donnelly	John Foster	Paul Terry	November 1, 1952
Oil Can Harry and Pearl Pureheart meet Mighty Mouse in Holland this time.
72	"A Soapy Opera"	Connie Rasinski	John Foster	Paul Terry	January 1, 1953
Pearl Pureheart is the laundry maid beholden to Oil Can Harry, and only Mighty Mouse can rescue her.
73	"Hero for a Day"	Mannie Davis	John Foster	Paul Terry	April 1, 1953
A humble mouse dreams of being Mighty Mouse so he can impress the girl of his dreams, but the cats know the difference.
74	"Hot Rods"	Eddie Donnelly	John Foster	Paul Terry	June 1, 1953
Teenage mice driving their hot rods get into trouble that only Mighty Mouse can fix. (Technicolor)
75	"When Mousehood Was in Flower"	Connie Rasinski	John Foster	Paul Terry, Bill Weiss	July 1, 1953
Taxes are at the heart of the troubles for the nobleman and his daughter Pearl. The Black Night (Oil Can Harry) wants the daughter's hand in marriage, and only Mighty Mouse can set things in order.
76	"Spare the Rod"	Connie Rasinski	John Foster	Paul Terry	January 1, 1954
Mighty Mouse must teach respect to a group of unruly mice children.
77	"The Helpless Hippo"	Connie Rasinski	John Foster	Paul Terry	March 1, 1954
Mighty Mouse meets his match when he tries to rescue a baby hippo and discovers that every baby animal in the jungle wants him as their babysitter.
78	"The Reformed Wolf"	Connie Rasinski	John Foster	Paul Terry	October 1, 1954
Mighty Mouse convinces a wolf that carrots are preferable to mutton.
79	"Outer Space Visitor"	Dave Tendlar	John Foster	Gene Deitch	November 1, 1959
Cheeseville is invaded by an infant, robot-like alien. Everyone thinks it's cute, until they learn that its parent plans to wipe out Cheeseville.
80	"The Mysterious Package"	Mannie Davis	Bob Kuwahara	Bill Weiss	December 15, 1960
A mechanical monster is kidnapping the children of Mouseville. Mighty Mouse must go to the alien world to bring them back.
81	"Cat Alarm"	Connie Rasinski	Larz Bourne, Tom Morrison	Bill Weiss	February 7, 1961
The cats use Mighty Mouse to capture the mice of Cheeseville by making him believe the dam has burst and threatens the town. While trying to warn them, he sends the mice into the waiting clutches of the waiting cats.

== Comics ==
Mighty Mouse's first comic book appearance was in Terry-Toons Comics #38 (November 1945), published by Timely Comics. Mighty Mouse was featured in:

- Terry-Toons Comics #38–85 (1945–1951)
- Paul Terry's Comics #86–125 (1951–1955)

Mighty Mouse was also featured in two main titles by several different publishers: Mighty Mouse and The Adventures of Mighty Mouse.

- Mighty Mouse, Timely Comics #1–4 (1946)
- Mighty Mouse Comics, St. John Publications #5–21 (1947–1949)
- Paul Terry's Mighty Mouse Comics, St. John Publications #22–67 (1949–1955)
- Paul Terry's Mighty Mouse, Pines Comics #68–83 (1956–1959)
- Paul Terry's Mighty Mouse Adventures, St. John Publications #1 (1951)
- Adventures of Mighty Mouse, St. John Publications #2–18 (1952–1955)
- The Adventures of Mighty Mouse (renaming of Paul Terry's Comics, where Mighty Mouse appeared)
  - St. John Publications #126–128 (1955); as Paul Terry's Adventures of Mighty Mouse
  - Pines Comics #129–144 (1956–1959)
  - Dell Comics #144–155 (1959–1961) NOTE: Dell's series also started with an issue numbered 144
  - Gold Key Comics #156–160 (1962–1963)
  - Dell Comics #161–172 (1964–1968)
- Mighty Mouse, Spotlight Comics, #1–2 (1987)
- Mighty Mouse, Marvel Comics, #1–10 (1990), based on the Ralph Bakshi version (Mighty Mouse: The New Adventures)
- Mighty Mouse, Dynamite Entertainment, #1–5 (2017–2018, collected as Volume 1: Saving the Day, ISBN 978-1-5241-0386-6)

In 1953, Mighty Mouse was featured in Three Dimension Comics #1, the first three-dimensional comics publication, produced by St. John Publications. According to co-creator Joe Kubert, the 3-D issue sold an extraordinary 1.2 million copies at 25 cents each, more than twice the standard comic price of 10 cents.

== DVD releases ==
- Mighty Mouse: The New Adventures, the first official release of Mighty Mouse material, was released on January 5, 2010.

At least one short, Wolf! Wolf!, has fallen into the public domain and is available at the Internet Archive.

== Controversy ==
Stills from the Mighty Mouse: The New Adventures episode "The Littlest Tramp". Top left: the flower is crushed by the rich man. Top right: Mighty Mouse receives the remains of the flower, which falls apart in his hand. Bottom left: Mighty Mouse thinks fondly of the girl, and brings out what's left of the flower. Bottom right: Mighty Mouse smells the flower, inhaling it in the process.

In 1988, Mighty Mouse: The New Adventures was the subject of media controversy when one scene was interpreted as a depiction of cocaine use. In the episode "The Littlest Tramp" a poor mouse girl attempts to sell flowers, and is repeatedly harassed by a rich man who crushes her flowers. She runs out of flowers and makes new ones from sundry items she finds, such as tomato slices, but the man crushes these too. Mighty Mouse attempts to purchase the flowers with his chunk of cheese, and to avenge the girl, but she gives Mighty Mouse the crushed flowers and insists that others need help more than she does. After successfully saving several different characters, he is reminded of the girl, and attempts to smell the flowers she gave him (now a pink powder), inhaling them in the process. He then finds the man that has been harassing the girl, and spanks him. The girl is sympathetic to the man, and he is so moved that the two are married.

A family in Kentucky saw the episode and reportedly interpreted the scene as Mighty Mouse snorting cocaine. The family called the American Family Association in Tupelo, Mississippi. The group demanded Bakshi be removed from production of the series. Bakshi and CBS denied the allegations, Bakshi stating the whole incident "smacks of McCarthyism. I'm not going to get into who sniffs what. This is lunacy." To defuse the controversy, Bakshi agreed to cut the 3.5 seconds from the episode. Rev. Donald Wildmon claimed that the editing was a "de facto admission" of cocaine use, though Bakshi maintained that the episode was "totally innocent".

It's because of Fritz that they're going after Mighty Mouse. I grew up in Brownsville in Brooklyn and attended High School for Industrial Arts. I remember teachers who quit. Because of McCarthyism they weren't able to teach what they wanted. This is the same thing. Mighty Mouse was happy after smelling the flowers because it helped him remember the little girl who sold it to him fondly. But even if you're right, their accusations become part of the air we breathe. That's why I cut the scene. I can't have children wondering if Mighty Mouse is using cocaine.

— Ralph Bakshi, The New York Times

== Cultural influences ==
In the book Astro Boy Essays, author Frederik L. Schodt quotes Japanese animator Osamu Tezuka as saying that Mighty Mouse was the influence that inspired him to name his well-known character Mighty Atom (also known as Astro Boy). He also chose to imitate Mighty Mouse's signature flying pose with one arm stretched ahead with a clenched fist.

Mighty Mouse was planned to make a cameo in the deleted scene "Acme's Funeral" from the 1988 film Who Framed Roger Rabbit.

Mighty Mouse was featured on famed guitarist Tom Scholz's Les Paul guitar.

Sacramento hard rock band Tesla released a song titled "Mighty Mouse" on their 2004 album Into the Now.

As part of Andy Kaufman's act, he would play the Mighty Mouse theme while standing in place, then lip-sync only the line "Here I come to save the day" with great enthusiasm. A 1975 performance of this act on Saturday Night Live is recreated in the 1999 biopic Man on the Moon and the 2024 film Saturday Night.

=== Apple trademark dispute ===
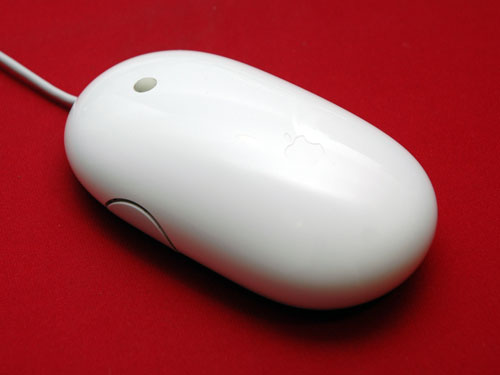
Apple Mighty Mouse

On August 2, 2005, Apple released the company's first multi-button USB computer mouse. The product was designed by Mitsumi Electric, and premiered under the name Apple Mighty Mouse. Apple continued to use the name when the product was redesigned as a Bluetooth device in 2006. Prior to its release, CBS licensed the right to use the Mighty Mouse name to Apple. In 2008, Man and Machine, Inc., a company that produces medical-grade, chemical-resistant mice and keyboards, sued both Apple and CBS for trademark infringement. Man and Machine claimed that it had used the name since 2004 and that CBS did not have the right to license the name for computer peripherals. In 2009, the U.S. Patent and Trademark Office ruled in favor of Man and Machine and Apple changed the name of its product to the "Apple Mouse".

== See also ==
- Demetrious Johnson, Mixed Martial Arts fighter
- Dinkan, a Malayalam comic superhero mouse
